= List of tallest structures in Tokyo =

Tall buildings in Tokyo
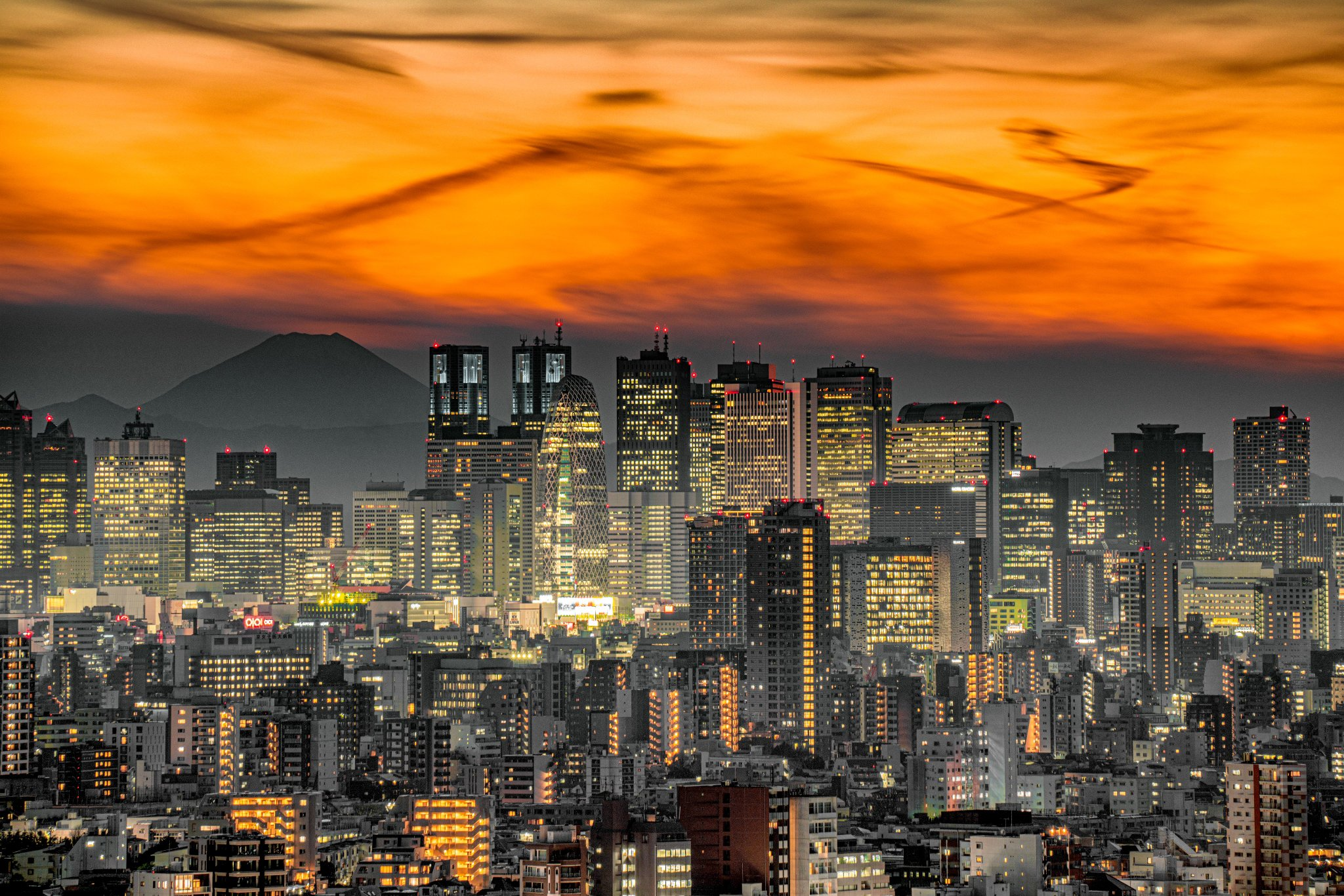
- Skyscrapers of Nishi-Shinjuku in Shinjuku
- Tallest building: Azabudai Hills Mori JP Tower (2023)
- Tallest building height: 325 m (1,068 ft)
- Tallest structure: Tokyo Skytree (2012)
- Tallest structure height: 634 m (2,080 ft)
- First 150 m+ building: Kasumigaseki Building (1968)

Number of tall buildings (2025)
- Taller than 100 m (328 ft): 638
- Taller than 150 m (492 ft): 204
- Taller than 200 m (656 ft): 42
- Taller than 300 m (984 ft): 1

Skyline of Special wards of Tokyo from Tokyo Metropolitan Government Building.

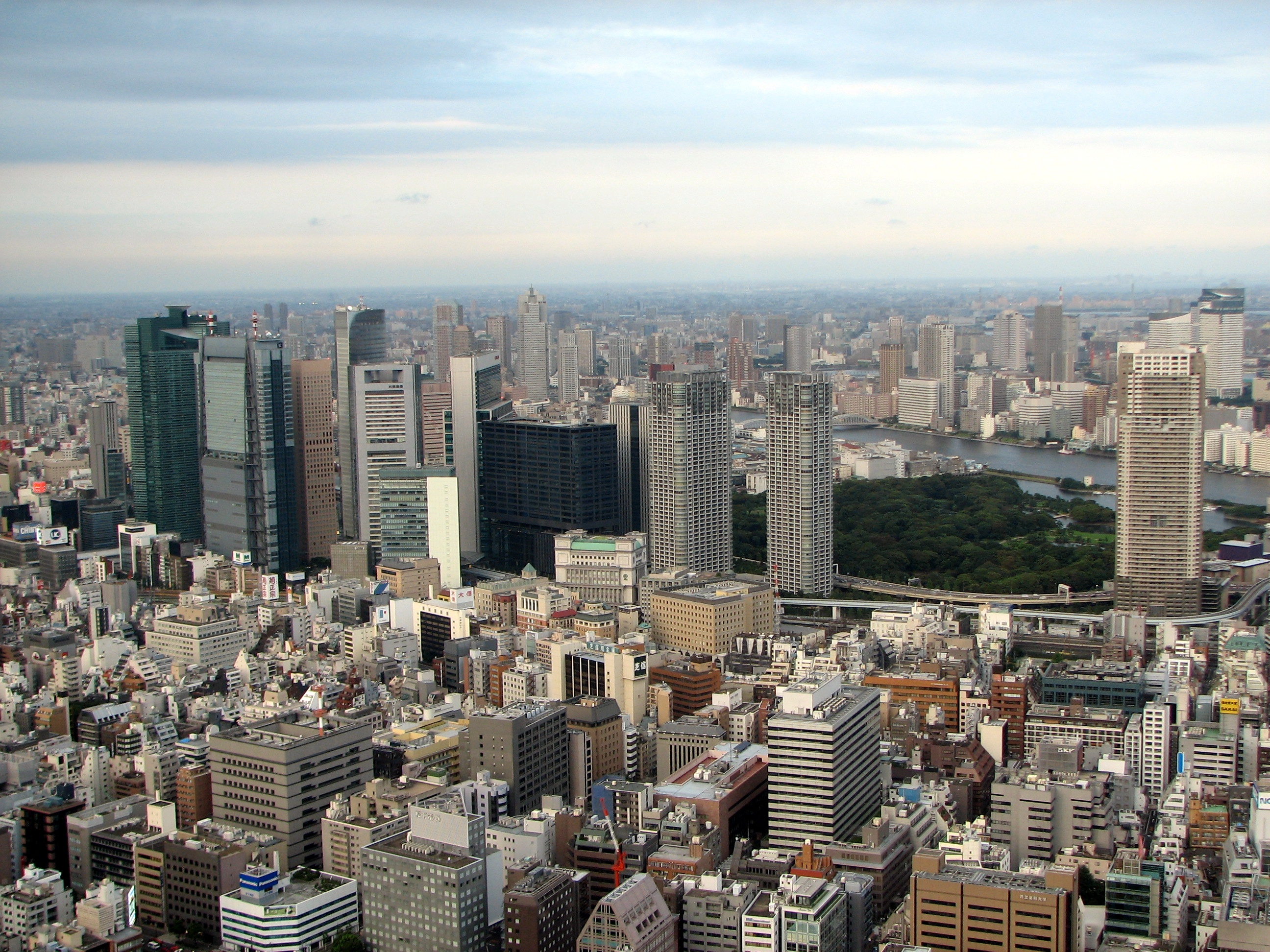
Skyscrapers of Shiodome located in the Minato.

Tokyo is the most populated of Japan's 47 prefectures. Mainland Tokyo is divided into two sections: Western Tokyo and the special wards of Tokyo. The prefecture's tallest structures are within the 23 special wards, which comprise the area formerly incorporated as Tokyo City. As of May 2025, there are over 200 structures in Tokyo that stand at least 150 metres (490 ft) tall, of which 49 are at least 200 metres (660 ft) tall, including those that are still under construction but have been topped out. Most of these structures are buildings; however, there are other types of structures among the tallest in the prefecture, such as freestanding towers and incineration smokestacks.

The tallest structure in the prefecture is Tokyo Skytree, a megatall lattice tower that rises 634 metres (2,080 feet), which was completed in 2012. It also stands as the tallest structure in Japan, the tallest tower in the world, and the third-tallest freestanding structure in the world. The second-tallest structure in Tokyo is the 333-metre-tall (1,093-foot) Tokyo Tower, a lattice tower completed in 1958. The tallest building and third-tallest overall structure is the 325-metre-tall (1,066-foot) Azabudai Hills Mori JP Tower, completed in 2023 and being Tokyo's only supertall skyscraper. It is also the tallest building in Japan and the world's largest skyscraper by floor area. The second-tallest building and fourth-tallest structure is the 284-metre-tall (932-foot) Nihonbashi 1-Chōme Central District Redevelopment (tentative name), which is topped out and scheduled for completion in 2026. Including topped-out buildings, Tokyo is home to 17 of the 25 tallest freestanding structures and 18 of the 25 tallest buildings in Japan.

As of May 2025, 29 skyscrapers are under construction in the prefecture (150 m or taller), with 11 planned to rise higher than 200 metres, including a supertall skyscraper—the 385-metre-tall (1,263-foot) Torch Tower—which is set to become the new tallest building in Tokyo and Japan upon completion in 2028.

== History ==
Skyscrapers are a relatively recent phenomenon in Japan. Before World War II, the tallest buildings in Tokyo were the 69-metre-tall (226-foot) Ryōunkaku—severely damaged in the 1923 Great Kantō earthquake and subsequently demolished—and the 65-metre-tall (213-foot) National Diet Building. Due to aesthetic and engineering concerns, Japan's Building Standard Law set an absolute height limit of 31 metres (102 ft) until 1963, when the limit was abolished in favor of a floor area ratio limit. Following these changes in building regulations, the Kasumigaseki Building was constructed and completed in 1968. Double the height of Japan's previous tallest building—the 17-story Hotel New Otani Tokyo—the Kasumigaseki Building is regarded as Japan's first modern skyscraper, rising 36 stories and 156 metres (512 feet) in height.

A booming post-war Japanese economy and the hosting of the 1964 Summer Olympics helped lead to a building boom in Tokyo during the 1960s and 1970s. Tokyo pioneered the skyscraper construction boom in Asia (150 m or taller), with several of its skyscrapers holding the title of tallest building in Asia during those decades. Construction continued through the 1980s and 1990s as the Japanese asset price bubble rose and fell. Nishi-Shinjuku, a district within Shinjuku, was the prefecture's first major skyscraper development area. Starting with the construction of the Keio Plaza Hotel in 1971, the district is now home to 11 of Tokyo's 50 tallest skyscrapers. Other major skyscraper districts have since been developed, such as the ones around Tokyo Station, Shiodome, Toranomon, or Shibuya Station.

Tokyo has been the site of many skyscraper construction projects in recent years. Over the past decade, 16 buildings rising higher than 200 metres have been completed, of which 7 were completed since 2023. A total of 63 buildings standing at least 150 metres in height have been completed in the prefecture since 2015. Several other skyscraper construction projects have been proposed for the near future, as Tokyo is experiencing a "once-in-a-century" redevelopment boom.

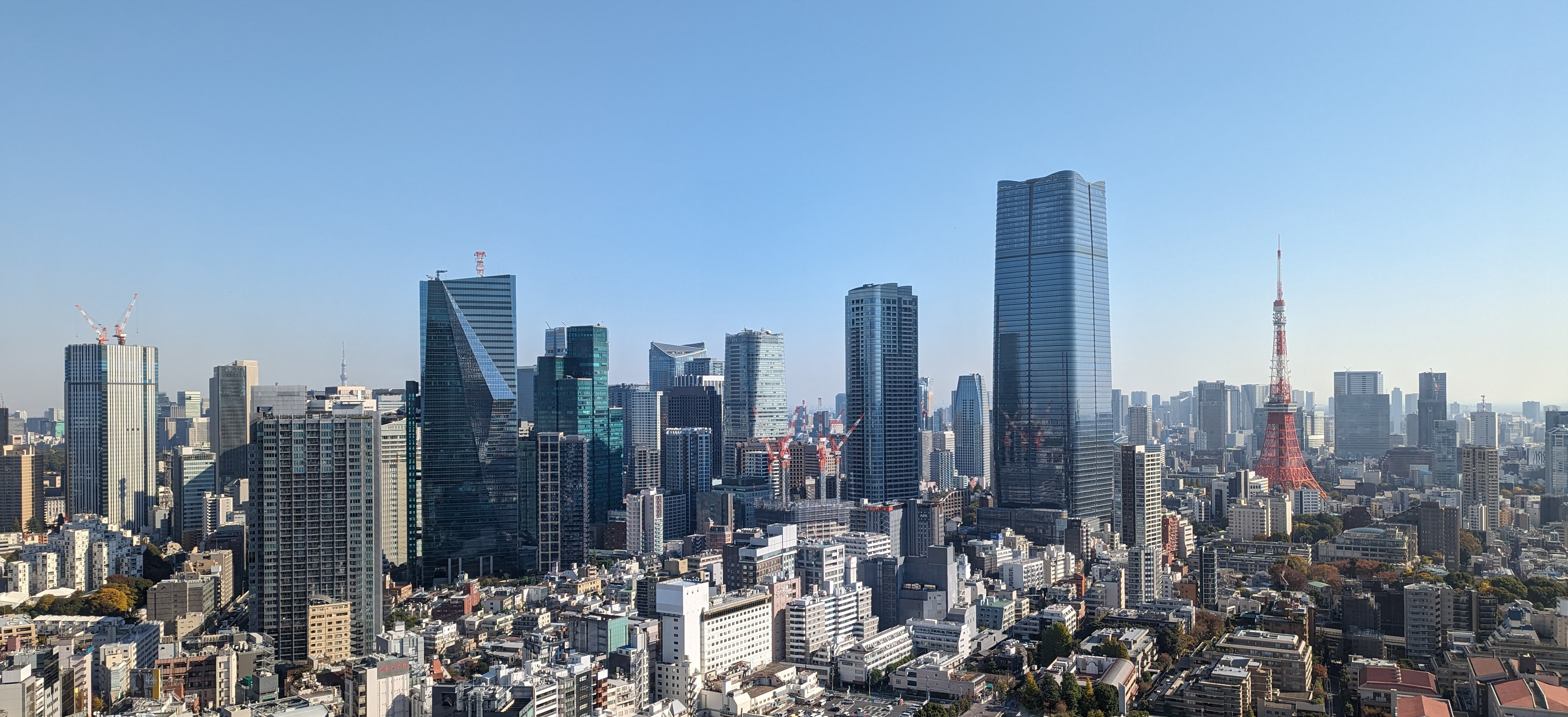
Skyline of Minato, as seen from Roppongi Hills Mori Tower in November 2023.

== Tallest buildings ==
This list ranks the 50 tallest skyscrapers in Tokyo, based on standard height measurement. This height includes spires and architectural details but does not include antenna masts. An equal sign (=) following a rank indicates that two or more buildings share the same height. The "Year" column indicates the year in which a building was completed. Freestanding towers, smokestacks, and other non-habitable or partially habitable structures are included for comparison purposes; however, they are not ranked. These structures are measured by pinnacle height, which includes masts.

Indicates non-habitable or partially habitable structures, such as freestanding towers or smokestacks, as well as buildings with masts or towers
Indicates buildings that are still under construction but have been topped out

Rank	Name	Image	Height m (ft)	Floors	Year	Location	Notes
—	Tokyo Skytree^{[A]}	View of a tall, slender, gray structure	634 (2,080)	32	2012	Sumida 35°42′36.5″N 139°48′39″E	Structure type: lattice tower; Tallest tower in the world; Tallest structure in East Asia; Tallest structure to top out worldwide in the 2010s; Observation decks are located at approx. 350 and 450 m (1,150 and 1,480 ft) high; The 158-metre (518-foot) East Tower is part of the complex
—	Tokyo Tower^{[A]}	View of an orange and white lattice frame; the structure curves and widens near the bottom and comes to a point at the top	333 (1,092)	7	1958	Minato 35°39′31″N 139°44′44″E	Structure type: lattice tower; Tallest 4-sided lattice tower in the world; Tallest tower in the world at the time of its completion; Tallest freestanding structure completed in the world in the 1950s; Observation decks are located at 150 and 250 m (490 and 820 ft); however, SkyscraperPage claims the real heights are 125 and 225 m (410 and 738 ft)
1	Azabudai Hills Mori JP Tower	Azabudai Hills Mori JP Tower	325 (1,068)	64	2023	Minato 35°39′39″N 139°44′26″E	Tallest building in Japan; Largest skyscraper in the world by floor area; Tallest building completed in Japan in the 2020s
2	Tokyo Midtown Nihonbashi		284 (932)	52	2026	Chūō 35°40′58.66″N 139°46′32.49″E	Tallest building in Nihonbashi; 4th-tallest building in Japan
3	Toranomon Hills Station Tower	Toranomon Hills Station Tower	266 (872)	49	2023	Minato 35°40′2.76″N 139°44′51.08″E	Tallest building in Toranomon; The 185-metre (607-foot) Toranomon Hills Business Tower is also part of the Toranomon Hills complex; 5th-tallest building in Japan
4	Azabudai Hills Residence B	Azabudai Hills Residence B	263 (862)	64	2025	Minato 35°39′45.10″N 139°44′20.63″E	Tallest residential building in Japan: technically, it is mixed-use, but is predominantly residential (floors 6-64); Topped out: construction is expected to last until August 2025; 6th-tallest building in Japan
5	Toranomon Hills Mori Tower	Toranomon Hills	256 (838)	52	2014	Minato 35°40′1″N 139°44′58″E	Tallest building in Tokyo at the time of its completion; Tallest building completed in Tokyo in the 2010s; 9th-tallest building in Japan
6	Tofrom Yaesu Tower		250 (819)	51	2025	Chūō 35°40′51.27″N 139°46′14.06″E	Tallest building in Yaesu; Topped out: construction is expected to last until July 2025; 10th-tallest building in Japan
7	Midtown Tower	Midtown Tower	248 (814)	54	2007	Minato 35°39′58″N 139°43′53″E	Tallest building in Akasaka; Tallest building in Tokyo at the time of its completion; Tallest building completed in Japan in the 2000s; The 113-metre (371-foot) Midtown East is part of the complex; 11th-tallest building in Japan
8	Tokyo Metropolitan Government Building No. 1	Tokyo Metropolitan Government Building No. 1	243 (799)	48	1991	Shinjuku 35°41′22″N 139°41′29.5″E	Tallest building in Nishi-Shinjuku; Tallest city hall in the world: the complex includes Building No. 1, which features two public observation decks over 200 m (660 ft) high, and a 163-metre (535-foot) Building No. 2; Tallest building in Japan at the time of its completion; Tallest building completed in Tokyo in the 1990s; 14th-tallest building in Japan
9=	Sunshine 60	Ground-level view of a gray, rectangular high-rise lined with columns of windows	240 (787)	60	1978	Toshima 35°43′46.5″N 139°43′4″E	Tallest building in Higashi-Ikebukuro; Tallest building in Asia at the time of its completion; Tallest building completed in Asia in the 1970s; Part of Sunshine City, which includes the 130-metre (430-foot) Prince Hotel, it features the TENBOU-PARK observation deck, located over 225 m (738 ft) high; 15th-tallest building in Japan
9=	NTT Docomo Yoyogi Building	Ground-level view of a brown, rectangular high-rise; as it rises, it terraces to a point and a white and an orange antenna rises from the top. A clock is located on one side of the building.	240 (787)	27	2000	Shibuya 35°41′3.7″N 139°42′11.7″E	Tallest building in Sendagaya; 2nd-tallest clock tower in the world; Pinnacle height: 272 m (892 ft); Tallest building in Tokyo by pinnacle height before completion of the Mori JP Tower; 15th-tallest building in Japan
9=	Tokyo Midtown Yaesu Yaesu Central Tower		240 (787)	45	2022	Chūō 35°40′45″N 139°46′8″E	Part of the Tokyo Midtown brand, which includes the Midtown Tower and the 191-metre (627-foot) Tokyo Midtown Hibiya; 15th-tallest building in Japan
12	Roppongi Hills Mori Tower	Aerial view of a gray, oval-shaped high-rise lined with rows of windows; the facade is bisected by a smaller midsection	238 (781)	54	2003	Minato 35°39′38″N 139°43′45″E	Tallest building in Roppongi; The Tokyo City View observation deck is located at approx. 220 m (720 ft) high (250 m (820 ft) above sea level); The 159-metre (522-foot) Residences B and C are part of the complex
13	Azabudai Hills Residence A	Toranomon Azabudai East Tower	237 (778)	54	2023	Minato 35°39′43.77″N 139°44′25.24″E	2nd-tallest residential building in Japan: technically, it is mixed-use, but is predominantly residential (floors 14–54)
14	Shinjuku Park Tower	Shinjuku Park Tower	235 (771)	52	1994	Shinjuku 35°41′8″N 139°41′27.4″E	It consists of three connected block-shaped elements: S Tower (235 metres; 771 feet), C Tower (209 metres; 686 feet), and N Tower (182 metres; 597 feet)
15	Tokyo Opera City Tower	Mid-level view of a white, window-dotted, rectangular high-rise; the corners are cut and made of glass	234 (769)	54	1996	Shinjuku 35°40′58″N 139°41′12.6″E	The 127-metre (417-foot) NTT Shinjuku HQ Building is connected to it through an elevated walkway
16	Sumitomo Fudosan Roppongi Grand Tower		231 (757)	40	2016	Minato 35°39′52.6″N 139°44′15.6″E	The 109-metre (358-foot) Roppongi Grand Tower Residence is part of the complex
17	Shibuya Scramble Square		230 (754)	47	2019	Shibuya 35°39′30″N 139°42′8″E	Tallest building in Shibuya (district); The SHIBUYA SKY observation deck features a 360-degree outdoor viewing area at approx. 230 metres (750 feet) high; It is connected through elevated walkways to nearby skyscrapers, such as the 183-metre (600-foot) Shibuya Hikarie and the 180-metre (590-foot) Shibuya Stream and Shibuya Sakura Stage
18	Blue Front Shibaura Tower S		229 (751)	43	2025	Minato 35°39′3.38″N 139°45′26.40″E	Tallest building in Shibaura; The 166-metre (545-foot) Hamamatsucho Building (Toshiba Building) is adjacent to the north and will be replaced by the 227-metre (745-foot) Blue Front Shibaura Tower N
19=	Shinjuku Mitsui Building	Ground-level view of a black, rectangular high-rise. its glass facades are highly reflective and the smaller facade is bisected by black, inset, crisscrossed beams	225 (738)	55	1974	Shinjuku 35°41′30.8″N 139°41′38″E	Tallest building in Asia at the time of its completion
19=	Tokyu Kabukicho Tower		225 (738)	48	2023	Shinjuku 35°41′45″N 139°42′2″E	Tallest building in Kabukicho; Tallest building in Japan designed by a woman and currently the 4th-tallest in the world; Largest entertainment complex in Japan
21	Shinjuku Center Building	Ground-level view of a brown, rectangular high-rise; the window placement creates several horizontal bands on one side and one vertical stripe on the other	223 (731)	54	1979	Shinjuku 35°41′30.5″N 139°41′43″E	First skyscraper in the world retrofitted with seismic dampers designed to suppress vibrations from long-period ground motions of earthquakes
22	Toranomon Hills Residential Tower		222 (727)	54	2022	Minato 35°39′58″N 139°44′55″E	Tallest building in Atago; 3rd-tallest residential building in Japan: technically, it is mixed-use, but is predominantly residential (floors 4-54)
23	Saint Luke's Tower	Ground-level view of two blueish-grey buildings connected by an enclosed corridor near the top of the buildings	221 (724)	47	1994	Chūō 35°40′1″N 139°46′43″E	Tallest building in Akashicho; The 146-metre (479-foot) St. Luke's Residence is connected to it via a skybridge
—	Ministry of Defense Ichigaya Building B^{[A]}		220 (722)	10	1996	Shinjuku 35°41′36″N 139°43′36.5″E	Structure type: building w/ lattice tower; Tallest structure in Ichigaya-Honmuracho
—	Nittele Tower	Ground-level view of a blue, glass, rectangular high-rise; attached to one side of the building are two structures consisting of poles that run the height of the building	218 (715)	32	2003	Minato 35°39′52.7″N 139°45′35.6″E	Structure type: building w/ masts; Tallest structure in Higashi-Shinbashi and Shiodome; Architectural height: 193 m (633 ft); It features the NTV Big Clock designed by Hayao Miyazaki; Located at Sio-Site, which includes Shiodome City Center, the Dentsu Building, and other skyscrapers like the 173-metre (568-foot) Tokyo Shiodome Building and Shiodome Media Tower, and the 172-metre (564-foot) Royal Park Shiodome Tower
24	Shiodome City Center	Ground-level view of a high-rise's curved, reflective glass facade; it is bisected by a vertical groove	216 (708)	43	2003	Minato 35°39′55″N 139°45′40.5″E	Tallest building in Higashi-Shinbashi and Shiodome; Part of Sio-Site
25	Sumitomo Fudosan Tokyo Mita Garden Tower	Ground-level view of a glass skyscraper with red accents on its exterior	215 (705)	42	2023	Minato 35°38′42.70″N 139°44′35.30″E	Tallest building in Mita
26	Dentsu Building	Ground-level view of a thin high-rises's curved, glass facade	213 (700)	48	2002	Minato 35°39′52.7″N 139°45′46″E	The Caretta Shiodome observation deck is located at approx. 200 metres (660 feet) high; Part of Sio-Site
27	Tokiwabashi Tower		212 (696)	38	2021	Chiyoda 35°41′3″N 139°46′14″E	Tallest building in Otemachi; Part of the Tokyo Torch complex, which will include Torch Tower
28	Shinjuku Sumitomo Building	Ground-level view of a gray, window-dotted high-rise	210 (690)	52	1974	Shinjuku 35°41′28.7″N 139°41′33″E	First building in Asia to exceed 200 metres (660 feet) in height; First building completed in Japan with over 50 storeys; Tallest building in Asia at the time of its completion; Renovation works were completed in 2020, which included the construction of an all-weather atrium around the building's lower floors
—	Toshima Incineration Plant^{[A]}	Ground-level view of a tall, white, angular chimney rising from a brown, striped building	210 (689)	11	1999	Toshima 35°44′4.8″N 139°42′51.9″E	Structure type: smokestack; Tallest incinerator chimney in the world; Tallest structure in Kami-Ikebukuro
29=	Shinjuku Nomura Building	Ground-level view of a white, rectangular, window-dotted high-rise; one side is vertically bisected	209 (686)	50	1978	Shinjuku 35°41′35″N 139°41′43″E	An observation deck is located at approx. 200 metres (660 feet) high
29=	The Parkhouse Nishi-Shinjuku Tower 60	The Parkhouse Nishi-Shinjuku Tower 60	209 (686)	60	2017	Shinjuku 35°41′37.75″N 139°41′12″E	Tallest all-residential building in Tokyo
29=	Tokyo World Gate Akasaka Trust Tower		209 (686)	43	2024	Minato 35°40′10.97″N 139°44′25.57″E	Part of the Tokyo World Gate brand, which includes the 180-metre (590-foot) Kamiyacho Trust Tower
29=	Tokyo PortCity Takeshiba Office Tower		209 (685)	39	2020	Minato 35°39′17.5″N 139°45′40.5″E	Tallest building in Kaigan and Takeshiba
33	Ark Hills Sengokuyama Mori Tower		207 (678)	47	2012	Minato 35°39′48″N 139°44′33″E	Part of the Ark Hills complex, which includes buildings like the 153-metre (502-foot) Ark Mori Building and the 133-metre (436-foot) ANA InterContinental Tokyo
34=	GranTokyo North Tower	Ground-level view of a glass, rectangular high-rise	205 (673)	43	2007	Chiyoda 35°40′40.3″N 139°46′0″E	Tallest building in Marunouchi; It is adjacent to Tokyo Station, with both connected via the GranRoof, and to the 178-metre (584-foot) Marunouchi Trust Tower
34=	GranTokyo South Tower	Mid-level view of a rectangular, glass high-rise; one side is vertically bisected by a section	205 (673)	42	2007	Chiyoda 35°40′43″N 139°46′2″E	Tallest building in Marunouchi; It is adjacent to Tokyo Station, with both connected via the GranRoof, and to the 150-metre (490-foot) Pacific Century Place Marunouchi
34=	Akasaka Intercity AIR		205 (673)	38	2017	Minato 35°40′11.5″N 139°44′31″E	The 135-metre (443-foot) Akasaka Intercity is located to the south of it
37	Mode Gakuen Cocoon Tower	Ground-level view of a blue, glass high-rise. Two opposite sides of the building curve inward until meeting at the top; these sides also have many white stripes haphazardly strewn across them.	204 (668)	50	2008	Shinjuku 35°41′30″N 139°41′49″E	It was awarded the 2008 Skyscraper of the Year by Emporis; 2nd-tallest educational building in the world
38	Izumi Garden Tower	Ground-level view of a green, glass high-rise composed of square sections that rise to differing heights	201 (659)	45	2002	Minato 35°39′52″N 139°44′23″E	The 116-metre (381-foot) Izumi Garden Residence is part of the complex
39=	Sompo Japan Building	Ground-level view of a thin, brown and white high-rise; the two wider sides curve and flair out as they near the bottom	200 (656)	43	1976	Shinjuku 35°41′33.8″N 139°41′46″E	
—	TEPCO Building	The TEPCO head office	200 (656)	22	1997	Chiyoda 35°40′12.9″N 139°45′30.8″E	Structure type: building w/ lattice tower; Tallest structure in Uchisaiwaichō; To be demolished: Tokyo Cross Park will be developed on its site
39=	JP Tower	Ground-level view of a blue, glass high-rise; the tower sits behind a small, white, stone, window-dotted facade	200 (656)	38	2012	Chiyoda 35°40′46.5″N 139°45′53″E	A large portion of the original Tokyo Central Post Office building was preserved as a facade on the lower floors and now features the KITTE Garden rooftop on the sixth floor
39=	Yomiuri Shimbun Building		200 (656)	33	2013	Chiyoda 35°41′13.9″N 139°45′51.5″E	
39=	Otemachi One Tower		200 (656)	40	2020	Chiyoda 35°41′16.5″N 139°45′47.5″E	The 158-metre (518-foot) Mitsui & Co. Building is also part of the Otemachi One complex
39=	Otemachi Tower		200 (655)	38	2013	Chiyoda 35°41′7.5″N 139°45′56″E	Built on the site of the demolished 105-metre (344-foot) Otemachi Financial Center
44	Grand City Tower Tsukishima		199 (654)	58	2026	Chūō 35°39′46.54″N 139°46′45.97″E	Tallest building in Tsukishima; Tallest building on the islands of Tokyo Bay; Topped out: construction is expected to last until April 2026
45	Shin-Marunouchi Building	Shin-Marunouchi Building	198 (650)	38	2007	Chiyoda 35°40′57″N 139°45′51.7″E	Located just north of the 179-metre (587-foot) Marunouchi Building, which was built on the site of the old 33-metre (108-foot) Marunouchi Building, Tokyo's tallest building from 1923 to 1936
46	World Trade Center South Tower		197 (647)	39	2021	Minato 35°39′17″N 139°45′22″E	Tallest building in Hamamatsucho; Part of the WTC Tokyo complex, which includes the 185-metre (607-foot) World Tower Residence and the 156-metre (512-foot) Nissei Hamamatsucho Crea Tower
47=	Sumitomo Fudosan Shinjuku Grand Tower	Ground-level view of a blue and black, rectangular, glass high-rise; one facade is covered in slightly protruding vertical stripes.	195 (641)	40	2011	Shinjuku 35°41′46″N 139°41′26″E	
—	Sky Tower West Tokyo	Ground-level view of a cluttered lattice structure	195 (640)	—	1989	Nishitōkyō^{[C]} 35°44′6.5″N 139°31′22.5″E	Structure type: lattice tower; Tallest structure in Western Tokyo
47=	Harumi Island Triton Square Tower X	Harumi Island Triton Square Tower X on the right	195 (639)	44	2001	Chūō 35°39′22.4″N 139°46′57″E	Tallest building in Harumi; The 175-metre (574-foot) Tower Y and the 155-metre (509-foot) Tower Z are part of the complex
47=	Nihonbashi Mitsui Tower	Ground-level view of a rectangular, glass high-rise; adjoining the high-rise is a stone building featuring columns	195 (639)	39	2005	Chūō 35°41′13″N 139°46′22.8″E	Tallest building in Nihonbashi-Muromachi; The 142-metre (466-foot) Nihonbashi Muromachi Mitsui Tower is adjacent to the north
47=	Park Tower Kachidoki South		195 (639)	58	2023	Chūō 35°39′23.09″N 139°46′34.35″E	Tallest building in Kachidoki; Part of Grand Marina Tokyo, alongside the 165-metre (541-foot) Park Tower Kachidoki Mid
51	Sanno Park Tower		194.45 (638)	44	2000	Chiyoda 35°40′23.3″N 139°44′26.4″E	
52	The Tokyo Towers Sea Tower		193.5 (635)	58	2008	Chuo 35°39′20.1″N 139°46′26.7″E	
53	The Tokyo Towers Mid Tower		193.5 (635)	58	2008	Chuo 35°39′20.1″N 139°46′26.7″E	
54	Kachidoki View Tower		193 (633)	55	2010	Chuo 35°39′35.23″N 139°46′35.85″E	
55	Tokyo Midtown Hibiya		192 (628)	37	2017	Chiyoda 35°40′21.5″N 139°45′32.9″E	
56	Tomihisa Cross Comfort Tower		191.0 (627)	55	2015	Shinjuku 35°41′30.9″N 139°42′48.5″E	
57	Acty Shiodome		190.25 (624)	56	2004	Minato 35°39′29.15″N 139°45′31.95″E	
58	Shinjuku I-Land Tower		189.4 (621)	44	1995	Shinjuku 35°41′35.6″N 139°41′35.3″E	
59	Owl Tower		189.2 (621)	52	2011	Toshima 35°43′38.8″N 139°43′11.3″E	
60	Brillia Tower Ikebukuro		189.0 (620)	49	2015	Toshima 35°43′35″N 139°42′56.2″E	
61	Okura Prestige Tower		188.65 (619)	41	2019	Minato 35°40′01.1″N 139°44′38.5″E	
62	Capital Gate Place		187.0 (614)	53	2015	Chuo 35°39′51.1″N 139°47′01.7″E	
63	World Tower Residence		186.76 (613)	46	2024	Minato 35°39′18.03″N 139°45′21.27″E	
63	Atago Green Hills Mori Tower		186.76 (613)	42	2001	Minato 35°39′44″N 139°44′55″E	
64	Toranomon Hills Business Tower		185.42 (608)	36	2019	Minato 35°40′03.98″N 139°45′00.13″E	
65	Cerulean Tower		184 (604)	41	2001	Shibuya 35°39′23.2″N 139°41′57.9″E	
65	Shinjuku Oak Tower		184 (604)	38	2002	Shinjuku 35°41′37.64″N 139°41′26.69″E	
66	Shibuya Hikarie		182.48 (599)	34	2012	Shibuya 35°39′32.5″N 139°42′12.8″E	
67	Branz Tower Toyosu		180.5 (592)	48	2021	Koto 35°39′05.9″N 139°47′35.0″E	
68	msb Tamachi Station Tower N		180.08 (591)	36	2020	Minato 35°38′45″N 139°44′59″E	
69	Century Park Tower		180.1 (591)	54	1999	Chuo 35°40′02″N 139°47′20″E	
70	Tokyo Garden Terrace Kioicho		180.0 (591)	36	2016	Chiyoda 35°40′46.5″N 139°44′13.2″E	
70	NEC Supertower		180.0 (591)	44	1990	Minato 35°38′58″N 139°44′53″E	
70	JA Building		180.0 (591)	37	2009	Chiyoda 35°41′19.4″N 139°45′45.8″E	
70	Tokyo Nihonbashi Tower		180.0 (591)	35	2015	Chuo 35°40′55″N 139°46′27″E	
70	Toyosu Bayside Cross Tower		180.0 (591)	36	2020	Koto 35°39′16.8″N 139°47′40.2″E	
71	Shibuya Sakura Stage Shibuya Tower		179.97 (591)	39	2023	Shibuya 35°39′25.1″N 139°42′06.5″E	
72	Shibuya Stream		179.95 (590)	35	2018	Shibuya 35°39′26″N 139°42′11″E	
72	Kamiyacho Trust Tower		179.95 (590)	37	2019	Minato 35°39′54.31″N 139°44′43.26″E	
73	Park City Toyosu Building A		179.9 (590)	52	2008	Koto 35°39′30.24″N 139°47′28.32″E	
74	Harumi Flag Sun Village Building T		179.6 (589)	50	2025	Chuo 35°38′58.2″N 139°46′30.2″E	
74	Harumi Flag Park Village Building T		179.6 (589)	50	2025	Chuo 35°38′58.2″N 139°46′30.2″E	
74	Keio Plaza Hotel Main Tower		179.6 (589)	47	1971	Shinjuku 35°41′24.36″N 139°41′40.20″E	
75	Sumitomo Fudosan Mita Twin Building West Tower		179.3 (588)	43	2006	Minato 35°38′38″N 139°44′33″E	
75	Akasaka Biz Tower		179.3 (588)	39	2008	Minato 35°40′23.6″N 139°44′11.0″E	
76	Marunouchi Building		179.0 (587)	37	2002	Chiyoda 35°40′51.69″N 139°45′49.61″E	
77	Kachidoki The Tower		178.78 (586)	53	2016	Chuo 35°39′23.6″N 139°46′20.7″E	
78	W Comfort Towers East		178.5 (586)	54	2004	Koto 35°38′44.6″N 139°48′18.3″E	
79	Park Tower Harumi		178.49 (586)	48	2018	Chuo 35°39′24.01″N 139°47′14.62″E	
80	Otemachi Place West Tower		178 (584)	35	2018	Chiyoda 35°41′06.6″N 139°46′01.8″E	
80	Marunouchi Trust Tower Main		178.0 (584)	37	2008	Chiyoda 35°40′57.6″N 139°46′10.7″E	
81	Deux Tours Canal&Spa East		177.3 (582)	52	2015	Chuo 35°39′19.5″N 139°46′40.9″E	
81	Deux Tours Canal&Spa West		177.3 (582)	52	2015	Chuo 35°39′16.56″N 139°46′37.92″E	
82	Harumi Island Triton Square Office Tower Y		174.9 (574)	40	2000	Chuo 35°39′22.9″N 139°46′52.5″E	
83	Nihonbashi Takashimaya Mitsui Building		174.66 (573)	31	2018	Chuo 35°41′01″N 139°46′28″E	
84	Tokyo Shiodome Building		173.2 (568)	37	2000	Minato 35°39′46.8″N 139°45′40.4″E	
85	Shiodome Media Tower		172.6 (566)	34	2003	Minato 35°39′47″N 139°45′32″E	
86	Park Axis Aoyama 1-chome Tower		172.4 (566)	46	2007	Minato 35°40′18″N 139°43′31.8″E	
87	Takanawa Gateway City Residence		172.17 (565)	44	2026	Minato 35°38′08.8″N 139°44′22.7″E	
88	Royal Park Shiodome Tower		172.0 (564)	38	2003	Minato 35°39′50.76″N 139°45′38.16″E	
89	Marunouchi Park Building		171.09 (561)	34	2009	Chiyoda 35°40′44.33″N 139°45′47.01″E	
90	Kyobashi Edogrand		170.37 (559)	32	2016	Chuo 35°40′38.7″N 139°46′10.2″E	
91	Park Court Akasaka Hinokicho The Tower		170.0 (558)	44	2018	Minato 35°40′04.8″N 139°43′47.5″E	

= Indicates buildings that have the same rank because they have the same height.

=== Tallest buildings in each ward or city ===
Buildings taller than 170 m in Tokyo special wards. An asterisk (*) next to the name of the building indicates it is located outside the map.
- 1950s and before
- 1960s
- 1970s
- 1980s
- 1990s
- 2000s
- 2010s
- 2020s
1 Azabudai Hills Mori JP Tower
2 Tokyo Midtown Nihonbashi Nomura Mitsui Tower
3 Toranomon Hills Station Tower
4 Azabudai Hills Residence B
5 Toranomon Hills Mori Tower
6 Tofrom Yaesu Tower
7 Midtown Tower
8 Tokyo Metropolitan Government Building No. 1
9 Sunshine 60
10 NTT Docomo Yoyogi Building
11 Tokyo Midtown Yaesu Yaesu Central Tower
12 Roppongi Hills Mori Tower
13 Azabudai Hills Residence A
14 Shinjuku Park Tower
15 Tokyo Opera City Tower
16 Sumitomo Fudosan Roppongi Grand Tower
17 Shibuya Scramble Square
18 Blue Front Shibaura Tower S
19 Shinjuku Mitsui Building
20 Tokyu Kabukicho Tower
21 Shinjuku Center Building
22 Toranomon Hills Residential Tower
23 Saint Luke's Tower
24 Nittele Tower
25 Shiodome City Center
26 Sumitomo Fudosan Tokyo Mita Garden Tower
27 Dentsu Building
28 Tokiwabashi Tower
29 Shinjuku Sumitomo Building
30 Shinjuku Nomura Building
31 The Parkhouse Nishi-Shinjuku Tower 60
32 Tokyo World Gate Akasaka Trust Tower
33 Tokyo PortCity Takeshiba Office Tower
34 Ark Hills Sengokuyama Mori Tower
35 GranTokyo North Tower
36 GranTokyo South Tower
37 Akasaka Intercity AIR
38 Mode Gakuen Cocoon Tower
39 Izumi Garden Tower
40 Sompo Japan Building
41 JP Tower
42 Yomiuri Shimbun Building
43 Otemachi One Tower
44 Otemachi Tower
45 Grand City Tower Tsukishima
46 Shin-Marunouchi Building
47 World Trade Center South Tower
48 Sumitomo Fudosan Shinjuku Grand Tower
49 Harumi Island Triton Square Tower X
50 Nihonbashi Mitsui Tower
51 Park Tower Kachidoki South
52 Sanno Park Tower
53 The Tokyo Towers Sea Tower
54 The Tokyo Towers Mid Tower
55 Kachidoki View Tower
56 Tokyo Midtown Hibiya
57 Tomihisa Cross Comfort Tower
58 Acty Shiodome
59 Shinjuku I-Land Tower
60 Owl Tower
61 Brillia Tower Ikebukuro
62 Okura Prestige Tower
63 Capital Gate Place
64 World Tower Residence
65 Atago Green Hills Mori Tower
66 Toranomon Hills Business Tower
67 Cerulean Tower
68 Shinjuku Oak Tower
69 Shibuya Hikarie
70 Branz Tower Toyosu
71 msb Tamachi Station Tower N
72 Century Park Tower
73 Tokyo Garden Terrace Kioicho
74 NEC Supertower
75 JA Building
76 Tokyo Nihonbashi Tower
77 Toyosu Bayside Cross Tower
78 Shibuya Sakura Stage SHIBUYA Tower
79 Shibuya Stream
80 Kamiyacho Trust Tower
81 Park City Toyosu Building A
82 Harumi Flag Sun Village Tower T
83 Harumi Flag Park Village Tower T
84 Keio Plaza Hotel Main Tower
85 Sumitomo Fudosan Mita Twin Building West Tower
86 Akasaka Biz Tower
87 Marunouchi Building
88 Kachidoki The Tower
89 W Comfort Towers East
90 Park Tower Harumi
91 Otemachi Place West Tower
92 Marunouchi Trust Tower Main
93 Deux Tours Canal&Spa East
94 Deux Tours Canal&Spa West
95 Harumi Island Triton Square Office Tower Y
96 Nihonbashi Takashimaya Mitsui Building
97 Tokyo Shiodome Building
98 Shiodome Media Tower
99 Park Axis Aoyama Itchome Tower
100 Takanawa Gateway City Residence
101 Royal Park Shiodome Tower
102 Marunouchi Park Building
103 Kyobashi Edogrand
104 Park Court Akasaka Hinokicho The Tower

The tables below list the tallest buildings in each of the 23 special wards of Tokyo, as well as in cities of Western Tokyo with buildings that stand approximately 100 metres (330 feet) or taller. Non-habitable or partially habitable structures are included if they are the tallest structure in a ward or city.

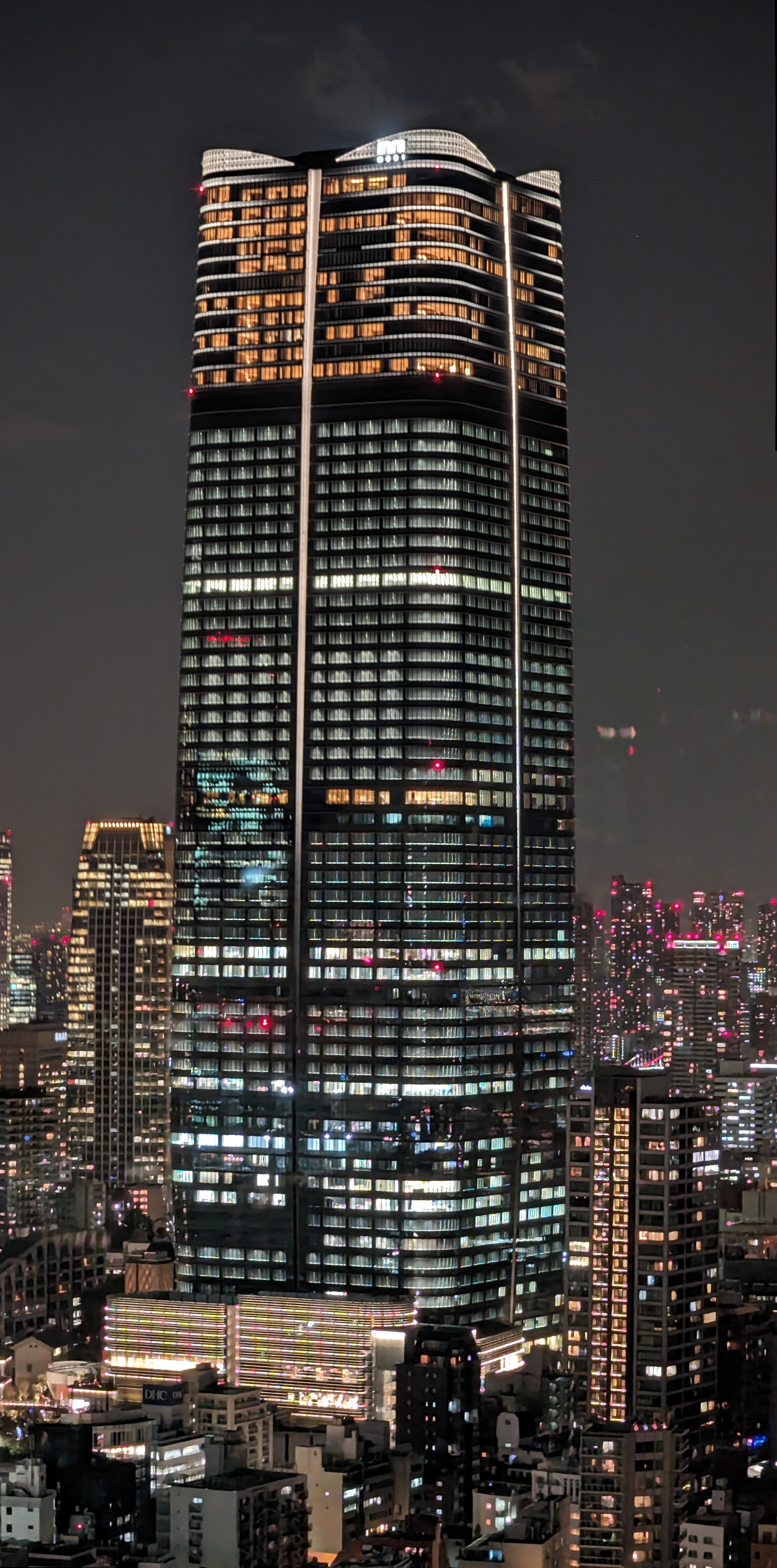
Night view of Azabudai Hills Mori JP Tower, the tallest building in Minato, Tokyo, and Japan.

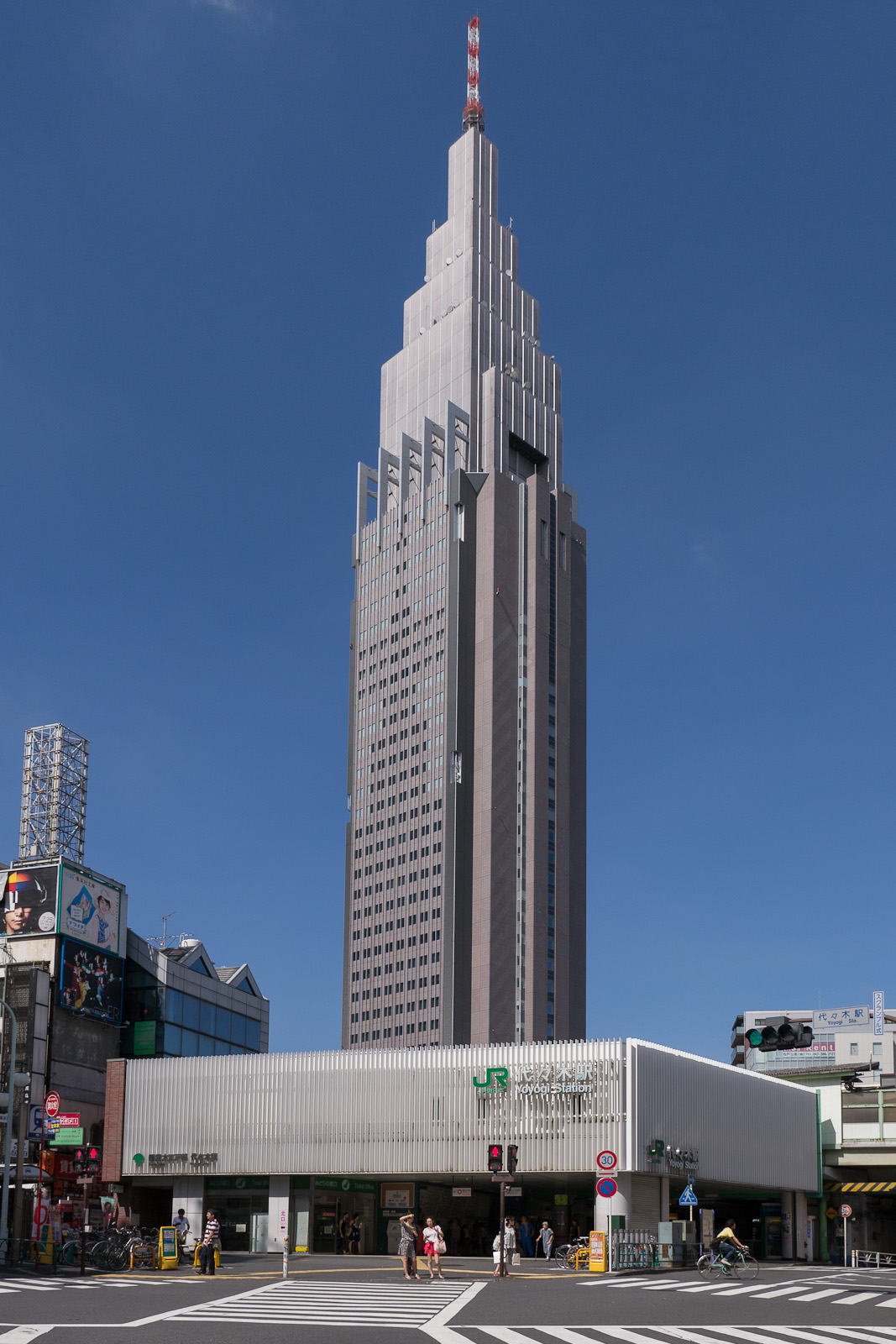
The NTT Docomo Yoyogi Building is the tallest building in Shibuya Ward by both architectural height and pinnacle height, the latter of which includes the mast on the building's rooftop.

Indicates non-habitable or partially habitable structures, such as freestanding towers, smokestacks, or masts
Indicates buildings that are still under construction but have been topped out

Ward	Name	Height m (ft)	Floors	Year	Notes
Chiyoda	Tokiwabashi Tower	212 (696)	38	2021	
Chūō	Nihonbashi 1-Chōme Central District	284 (932)	52	2026	
Minato	Tokyo Tower	333 (1,092)	7	1958	
Minato	Azabudai Hills Mori JP Tower	325 (1,068)	64	2023	
Shinjuku	Tokyo Metropolitan Government Building No. 1	243 (799)	48	1991	
Bunkyō	Tokyo Dome Hotel	155 (509)	43	2000	
Taitō	Renaissance Tower Ueno Ikenohata	137 (448)	38	2005	
Sumida	Tokyo Skytree	634 (2,080)	32	2012	
Sumida	Brillia Tower Tokyo	159 (522)	45	2006	
Kōtō	Branz Tower Toyosu	181 (592)	48	2021	
Shinagawa	Park Tower Gran Sky	153 (502)	44	2010	
Meguro	Naka-Meguro Atlas Tower	165 (541)	45	2009	
Ōta	Tamagawa Incineration Plant	100 (328)	—	2003	
Ōta	The River Place South Tower	100 (326)	28	2004	
Setagaya	Futako-Tamagawa Rise Tower & Residence East	151 (496)	42	2010	
Shibuya	NTT Docomo Yoyogi Building	272 (892)	27	2000	
Shibuya	NTT Docomo Yoyogi Building	240 (787)	27	2000	
Nakano	Nakano Station Residence	147 (482)	37	2024	
Suginami	Suginami Incineration Plant	160 (525)	—	2017	
Suginami	Park City Suginami Central Tower	93 (305)	28	2000	
Toshima	Sunshine 60	240 (786)	60	1978	
Kita	The Tower Jujo	146 (480)	39	2024	
Arakawa	Station Garden Tower	153 (502)	40	2008	
Itabashi	Itabashi Incineration Plant	130 (427)	—	2002	
Itabashi	I Tower	107 (351)	30	2002	
Nerima	Hikarigaoka Incineration Plant	150 (492)	—	2021	
Nerima	Dear Marks Capital Tower	116 (381)	35	2001	
Adachi	City Tower Senju-Ōhashi	154 (504)	42	2025	
Katsushika	Venasis Kanamachi Tower Residence	138 (453)	41	2009	
Edogawa	Proud Tower Hirai	114 (375)	29	2024	

City	Name	Height m (ft)	Floors	Year	Notes
Hachiōji	Southern Sky Tower Hachiōji	158 (517)	41	2010	
Tachikawa	Proud Tower Tachikawa	128 (420)	32	2016	
Fuchū	Grand-Tower Fuchu La Avenu	100 (329)	28	2005	
Chōfu	Grand Tower Chofu Kokuryo Le Passage	118 (388)	34	2004	
Machida	Dresser Tower Minami-Machida Grandberry Park	120 (394)	34	2024	
Koganei	Proud Tower Musashi-Koganei Cross West	100 (327)	26	2020	
Kokubunji	City Tower Kokubunji The Twin West	135 (443)	36	2018	
Tama	Brillia Tower Seiseki Sakuragaoka Blooming Residence	113 (370)	33	2022	
Nishitōkyō	Sky Tower West Tokyo	195 (640)	—	1989	
Nishitōkyō	Hibari Tower	109 (357)	33	2009	

=== Demolished buildings ===
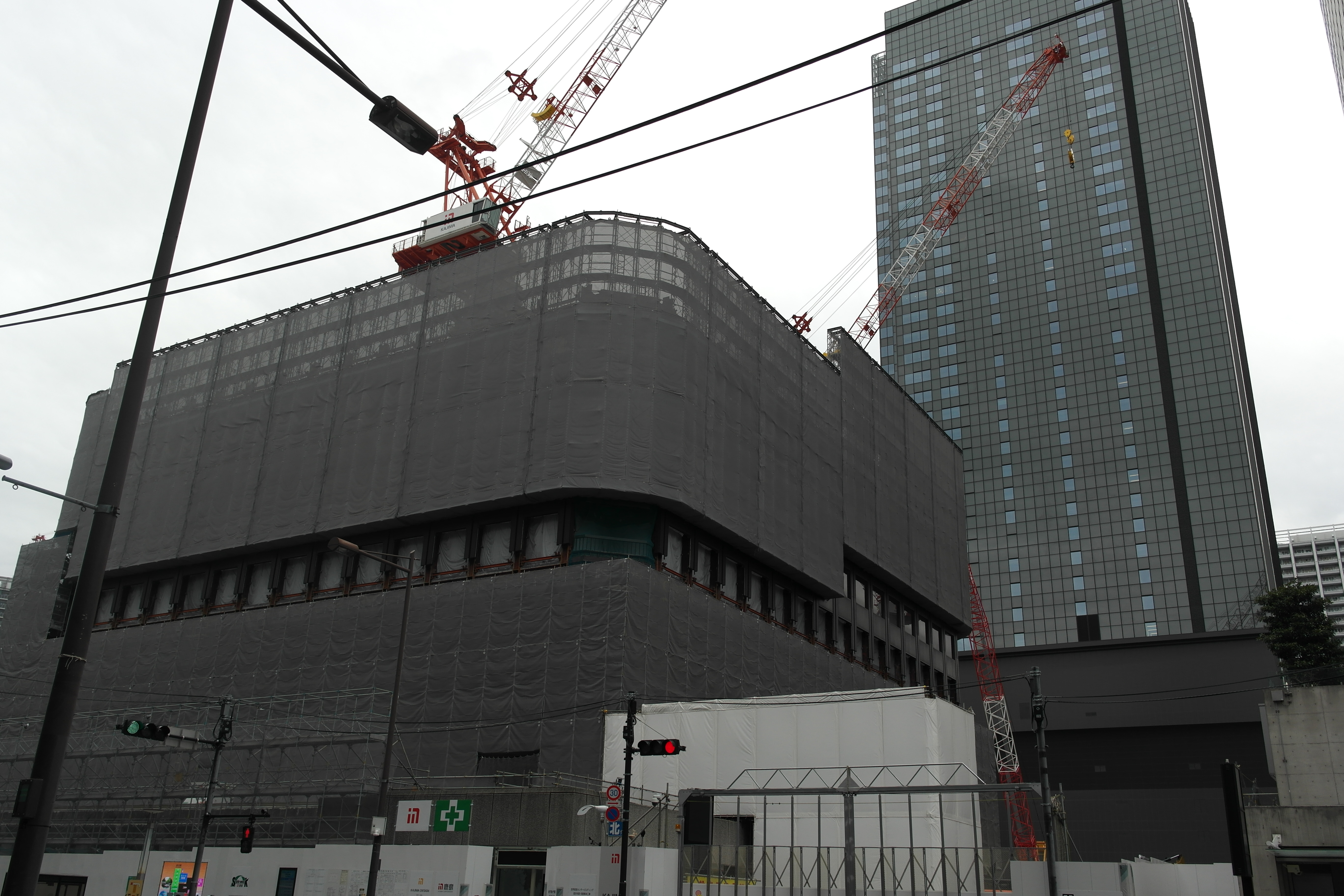
Demolition work on the WTC Building as of January 15, 2023.

This table lists buildings in Tokyo that have been demolished and once rose approximately 100 metres (330 feet) or taller, based on standard height measurement. The "Year built" column indicates the year in which a building was completed, while the "Year demolished" column indicates the year in which demolition work was finished. Buildings currently being demolished are also included, as well as buildings that are planned to be demolished.

Indicates buildings currently being demolished
Indicates buildings that are planned to be demolished

Name	Image	Height m (ft)	Floors	Year built	Year demolished	Location	Notes
Hamamatsucho Building (Toshiba Building)	Toshiba Building (Hamamatsucho Building)	166 (544)	40	1984	TBD	Minato 35°39′6.00″N 139°45′27.89″E	Tallest building completed in Japan in the 1980s; To be demolished: the 227-metre (745-foot) Blue Front Shibaura Tower N will be built on its site; Demolition is scheduled to start in January 2026
World Trade Center Building (1st Generation)	World Trade Center Building (1st Generation)	163 (533)	40	1970	2023	Minato 35°39′21.91″N 139°45′23.63″E	Tallest building in Asia at the time of its completion; Second skyscraper built in Japan (150 m or taller); The new 234-metre (768-foot) World Trade Center is under construction on its site
Akasaka Prince Hotel New Tower	Grand Prince Hotel Akasaka	139 (456)	39	1982	2013	Chiyoda 35°40′46.01″N 139°44′13.93″E	Tokyo Garden Terrace Kioicho was built on its site, including the 180-metre (590-foot) Kioi Tower
Mizuho Bank Uchisaiwaichō Head Office Building	Mizuho Bank Uchisaiwaichō Head Office Building	132 (433)	32	1981	2024	Chiyoda 35°40′14.21″N 139°45′26.56″E	Pinnacle height: 143 metres (469 feet); The 233-metre (764-foot) Tokyo Cross Park South Tower is under construction on its site
Imperial Hotel Tokyo Tower	Imperial Hotel Tower	129 (424)	31	1983	TBD	Chiyoda 35°40′18.64″N 139°45′33.87″E	To be demolished: the 230-metre (750-foot) Tokyo Cross Park North Tower will be built on its site; The 61-metre (200-foot) Imperial Hotel Tokyo Main Building is also set to be demolished, making way for the 145-metre (476-foot) new Main Building (scheduled for completion in 2036)
Shinsei Bank HQ Building (1993–2012)	Shinsei Bank HQ Building (1993–2012)	126 (413)	21	1993	2013	Chiyoda 35°40′15.07″N 139°45′13.04″E	The 111-metre (364-foot) Hibiya Park Front was built on its site
Asahi Seimei Otemachi Building	Asahi Mutual Life Insurance Otemachi Building	120 (392)	29	1971	2023	Chiyoda 35°41′4.08″N 139°46′8.04″E	The 385-metre (1,263-foot) Torch Tower is under construction on its site
SHINAGAWA GOOS	SHINAGAWA GOOS (Hotel Pacific Tokyo)	119 (390)	30	1971	2025	Minato 35°37′47.30″N 139°44′9.82″E	Currently being demolished; The 154-metre (505-foot) Shinagawa Station West Entrance District A Project will be built on its site
Shin-Gofukubashi Building	Shin-Gofukubashi Building	112 (369)	21	1977	2024	Chūō 35°41′1.48″N 139°46′18.21″E	The 218-metre (715-foot) Yaesu 1-Chōme North District Project is under construction on its site
MUFG Bank HQ (Mitsubishi UFJ)	Tokyo Mitsubishi UFJ Bank Head Office	111 (363)	24	1980	TBD	Chiyoda 35°40′43.2″N 139°45′51.5″E	To be demolished: the 160-metre (520-foot) M Plan will be built on its site
Hotel Sofitel Tokyo	Hotel Sofitel Tokyo	110 (362)	26	1994	2008	Taitō 35°42′45.43″N 139°46′5.55″E	First building of 100 m (330 ft) or taller demolished in Japan; The 107-metre (351-foot) Park Tower Ueno Ikenohata was built on its site
Hibiya U-1 Building (Yamato Seimei Building)	Hibiya U-1 Building (Yamato Seimei Building)	109 (359)	26	1984	2023	Chiyoda 35°40′18.50″N 139°45′27.56″E	The 235-metre (771-foot) Tokyo Cross Park Central Tower will be built on its site
Tokyo Kaijo Building	Tokyo Kaijo Building	108 (355)	25	1974	2024	Chiyoda 35°40′57.54″N 139°45′46.58″E	The wooden 111-metre (364-foot) Tokyo Marine Nichido Building will be built on its site
Resona Maruha Building	Resona Maruha Building	108 (354)	24	1978	2013	Chiyoda 35°41′10.02″N 139°45′43.20″E	The 115-metre (377-foot) Otemon Tower JX Building was built on its site
Otemachi Financial Center	Otemachi Financial Center	105 (344)	24	1992	2012	Chiyoda 35°41′7.44″N 139°45′53.94″E	The 200-metre (660-foot) Otemachi Tower was built on its site
Morinaga Plaza Building	Morinaga Plaza Building	100 (329)	24	1974	2025	Minato 35°38′47.81″N 139°44′51.78″E	Currently being demolished; The 125-metre (410-foot) Tamachi Station West Exit Area Redevelopment will be built on its site
Mitsui Bussan Building	Mitsui Bussan Building	100 (328)	24	1974	2016	Chiyoda 35°41′15.99″N 139°45′44.86″E	The 158-metre (518-foot) Mitsui & Co. Building was built on its site
Mitsubishi Tokyo UFJ Bank Otemachi Building		100 (327)	25	1973	2015	Chiyoda 35°41′12.3″N 139°45′45.1″E	The 150-metre (490-foot) Otemachi Park Building was built on its site
Kokusai Shin-Akasaka Building East Tower	Kokusai Shin-Akasaka Building East Tower	100 (327)	24	1980	2023	Minato 35°40′19.54″N 139°44′13.53″E	Pinnacle height: 139 metres (456 feet); The 207-metre (679-foot) Akasaka 2-6-Chōme District Project East Building is under construction on its site

== Under construction ==
The tables below list projects currently under construction. The cut-off height used for all lists corresponds to the height of the last entry on the Tallest buildings list above. Visionary projects are excluded but can be found in the List of tallest structures envisioned for Tokyo.

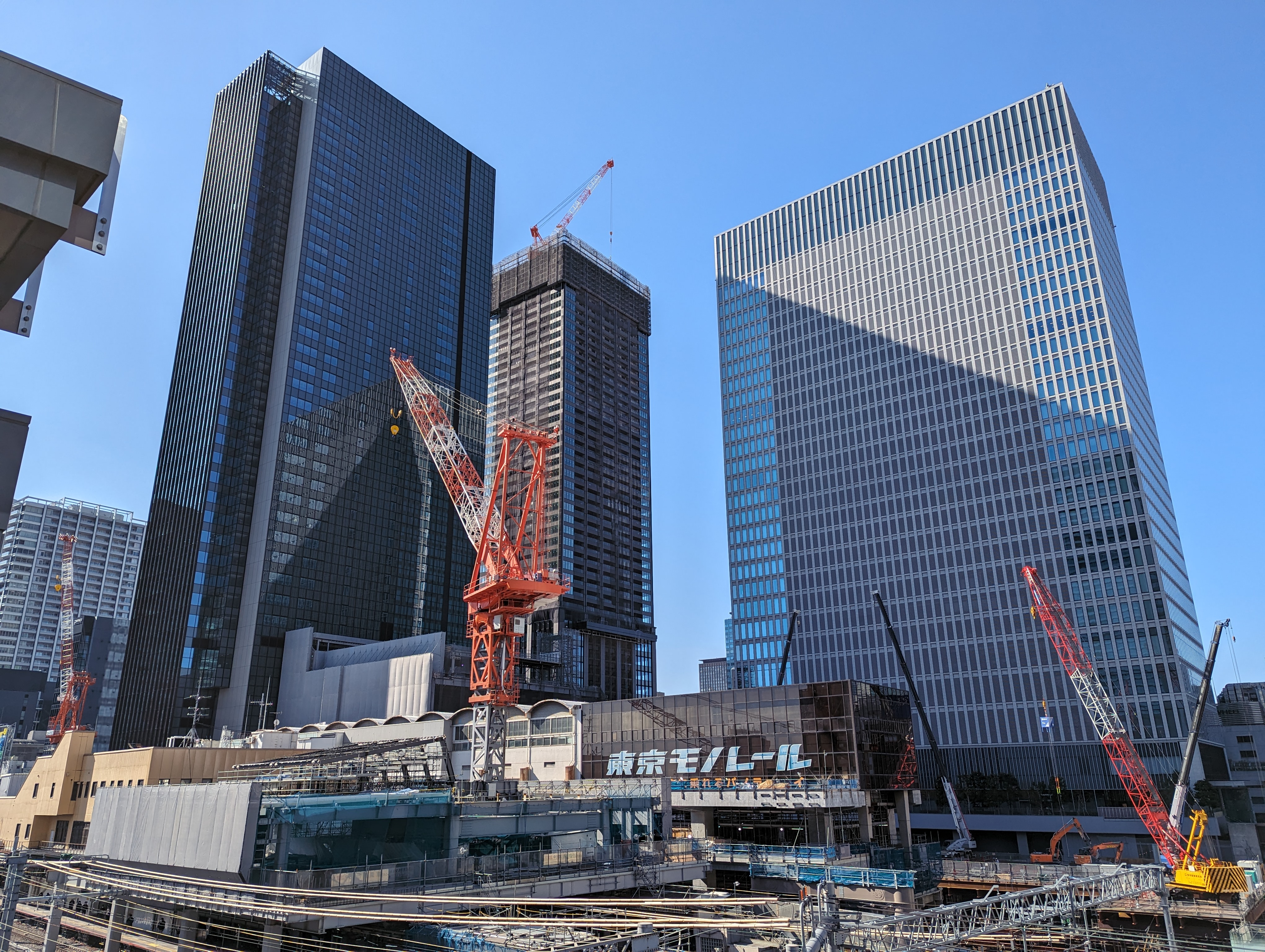
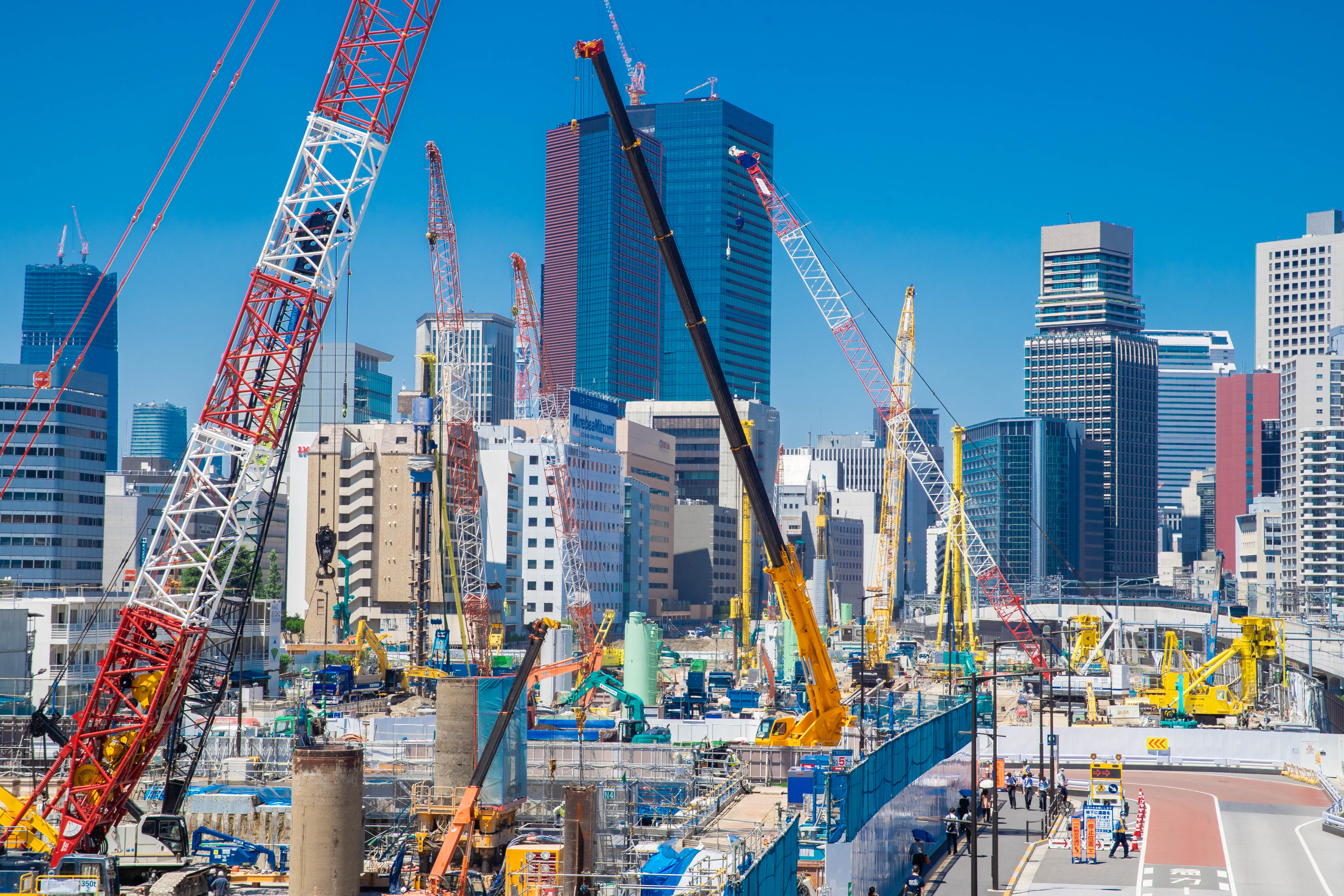
Construction of the new WTC as of February 3, 2024 (first image); and Takanawa Gateway City (foreground), Azabudai Hills Mori JP Tower (left, back), and Mita Garden Tower (center, back) as of June 25, 2022 (second image).

Buildings that have been topped out but are not yet completed are also included. A total of 29 skyscraper projects planned to rise at least 150 metres (490 feet) are underway in Tokyo, as of May 2025.

Indicates buildings that are still under construction but have been topped out

Name	Image	Height m (ft)	Floors	Start	Finish	Location	Sources / notes
Torch Tower		385 (1,263)	62	2023	2028	Chiyoda 35°41′5.11″N 139°46′9.67″E	Set to become the tallest building in Japan; It will have 117 elevators and is set to become the largest skyscraper in Japan by floor area—and, if completed today, the largest in the world—with approx. 550,000 m^{2} (5,900,000 sq ft); An observation deck is planned at approx. 370 m (1,210 ft) high; Sky Hill—a garden and hotel lobby—will be located over 300 m (980 ft) high; Under construction on the site of the demolished 120-metre (390-foot) Asahi Seimei Otemachi Building
Shinjuku Station West Gate Redevelopment		258 (847)	48	2024	2030	Shinjuku 35°41′28.57″N 139°41′58.40″E	Set to become the tallest building in Nishi-Shinjuku
World Trade Center (2nd Generation)		234 (766)	46	2022	2027	Minato 35°39′21.17″N 139°45′23.38″E	Set to become the tallest building in Hamamatsucho; Under construction on the site of the demolished 163-metre (535-foot) World Trade Center Building
NTT Hibiya Tower		234 (766)	48	2025	2031	Chiyoda; 35°40′16.6″N 139°45′26.5″E	
Tokyo Cross Park South Tower		233 (763)	46	2025	2029	Chiyoda 35°40′15.2″N 139°45′26.8″E	Under construction on the site of the demolished 132-metre (433-foot) Mizuho Bank Uchisaiwaichō Head Office
Roppongi 1-chome North District Plan		232 (762)	53	2025	2031	Minato 35°39′59.05″N 139°44′34.79″E	
Yaesu Core		223 (733)	43	2024	2029	Chūō 35°40′41.01″N 139°46′6.07″E	
Yaesu 1-Chōme North District Redevelopment		218 (715)	44	2024	2029	Chūō 35°41′0.8″N 139°46′19.4″E	Under construction on the site of the demolished 112-metre (367-foot) Shin-Gofukubashi Building
Akasaka 2-6-Chōme District Redevelopment East Building		207 (680)	40	2024	2028	Minato 35°40′19.56″N 139°44′13.56″E	Under construction on the site of the demolished 100-metre (330-foot) Kokusai Shin-Akasaka Building East Tower; A 100-metre (330-foot) West Building is also under construction as part of the project
Nishi-Azabu 3-Chōme Redevelopment		201 (660)	54	2025	2029	Minato 35°39′37.3″N 139°43′39.3″E	Set to become the tallest building in Nishi-Azabu
Grand City Tower Ikebukuro		190 (623)	52	2022	2027	Toshima 35°43′33.8″N 139°43′03.6″E	
The Toyomi Tower Marine&Sky East		189 (620)	53	2023	2026	Chūō 35°39′15.67″N 139°46′14.03″E	
The Toyomi Tower Marine&Sky West		189 (620)	53	2023	2026	Chūō 35°39′15.67″N 139°46′14.03″E	
Proud Tower Ikebukuro		185 (607)	47	2022	2027	Toshima 35°43′30.31″N 139°43′06.94″E	
Kita-Aoyama 3-chome District Type 1 Urban Redevelopment Project		180 (591)	38	2026	2030	Minato 35°40′07.57″N 139°42′51.32″E	
Higashi-Ikebukuro 1-chome District Type 1 Urban Redevelopment Project		174 (571)	31	2025	2028	Toshima 35°44′02.85″N 139°42′57.54″E	
Toranogate		171 (562)	29	2024	2027	Minato 35°40′10.52″N 139°45′02.55″E	

== Proposed ==
This list ranks buildings that are approved or proposed and are planned to rise at least 150 m (490 ft).

Name	Height m (ft)	Floors	Planned completion year	Location	Source
Roppongi 5-chome west district A-1 block	327 m (1,073 ft)	66	FY2030	Minato 35°39′36″N 139°44′01″E	
Roppongi 5-chome West District B Block	288 m (945 ft)	70	FY2030	Minato 35°39′36″N 139°44′01″E	
Ikebukuro Station West Exit Area Type 1 Urban Redevelopment Project, Block B	270 m (890 ft)	50	FY2038	Toshima	
Yaesu 2-chome South Special District	230 m (750 ft)	39	TBD	Chuo 35°40′35.4″N 139°46′03.2″E	
HIBIYA CROSSPARK North Tower	230 m (750 ft)	46	TBD	Chiyoda 35°40′17.02″N 139°45′29.2″E	
Nishi-Shinjuku 3-chome West District Redevelopment North Building	229 m (751 ft)	63	FY2035	Shinjuku 35°41′4.2756″N 139°41′19.6584″E	
Nishi-Shinjuku 3-chome West District Redevelopment South Building	228 m (748 ft)	62	FY2035	Shinjuku 35°41′4.2756″N 139°41′19.6584″E	
BLUE FRONT SHIBAURA TOWER N	227 m (745 ft)	45	2031	Minato 35°39′06.0″N 139°45′27.9″E	
Shinjuku Station Southwest Exit Area Development Project South Block	225 m (738 ft)	36	TBD	Shinjuku / Shibuya 35°41′17.9″N 139°41′58.4″E	
Ikebukuro Station West Exit Area Type 1 Urban Redevelopment Project, Block A	220 m (720 ft)	41	FY2048	Toshima	
Mita 3-chome Project	215 m (705 ft)	TBD	FY2031	Minato	
Nihonbashi 1-chome East District Redevelopment Block B	210 m (690 ft)	50	2035	Chuo 35°40′56.0″N 139°46′35.7″E	
Tsukiji District Urban Development Project MICE, Hotel, and Residence Building	210 m (690 ft)	43	FY2032	Chuo	
Tsukiji District Urban Development Project Office Building	210 m (690 ft)	41	Mid-2038	Chuo	
Shibuya REGENERATION Project Block B	208 m (682 ft)	41	2029	Shibuya	
Nihonbashi 1-chome East District Redevelopment, Block A	203 m (666 ft)	40	2034	Chuo 35°40′56.0″N 139°46′35.7″E	
Tsukiji District Urban Development Project Office and Residence Building	200 m (660 ft)	40	FY2032	Chuo	
Minami-Ikebukuro 2-chome B District Urban Redevelopment Project	195 m (640 ft)	57	TBD	Toshima	
Tsukiji District Urban Development Project Life Science and Commercial Complex Building	190 m (620 ft)	32	FY2032	Chuo	
Jingu Gaien District Redevelopment Office Building	190 m (620 ft)	38	FY2028	Minato 35°40′18.7104″N 139°43′07.3416″E	
Oji Station North Exit Area Urban Development Plan, West District	190 m (620 ft)	50	TBD	Kita	
Oji Station North Exit Area Urban Development Plan, East District	190 m (620 ft)	50	TBD	Kita	
Jingu Gaien District Redevelopment, Mixed-use Building A	185 m (607 ft)	40	FY2028	Minato 35°40′18.9012″N 139°43′03.9000″E	
Ikebukuro Station West Exit Area Type 1 Urban Redevelopment Project, Block C, East Building	185 m (607 ft)	33	FY2038	Toshima	
Tokyo Fire Department New Headquarters Building	185 m (607 ft)	22	FY2032	Chiyoda	
Kyobashi 3-chome East District Redevelopment	182 m (597 ft)	35	2032	Chuo 35°40′31.5″N 139°46′10.8″E	
Kanda Nishikicho 3-chome South East District Type 1 Urban Redevelopment Project	180 m (590 ft)	35	FY2036	Chiyoda	
Tsukiji District Urban Development Project Residence Building	180 m (590 ft)	37	FY2032	Chuo	
Miyamasuzaka District Redevelopment Block A	180 m (590 ft)	33	2031	Shibuya 35°39′36.3″N 139°42′10.2″E	
Shimomiyabi-cho District Type 1 Urban Redevelopment Project, Building A	180 m (590 ft)	32	FY2036	Shinjuku	
Shimomiyabi-cho District Type 1 Urban Redevelopment Project, Building B	180 m (590 ft)	47	FY2036	Shinjuku	
Toranomon 1-chome Central District Type 1 Urban Redevelopment Project	180 m (590 ft)	35	TBD	Minato	
Tsukiji 1-chome District Type 1 Urban Redevelopment Project, Block A	180 m (590 ft)	31	TBD	Chuo	
Tokyo University of Science Tamachi Campus Land Utilization Project	179 m (587 ft)	39	FY2033	Minato	
Kasumigaseki/Toranomon area	179 m (587 ft)	28	FY2036	Minato / Chiyoda	
Shibuya REGENERATION Project Block C	175 m (574 ft)	41	2029	Shibuya	
Nihonbashi Muromachi 1-chome District Redevelopment, Block A	173 m (568 ft)	34	2032	Chuo 35°41′06.9″N 139°46′28.8984″E	
Koraku 2-chome South District Type 1 Urban Redevelopment Project	170 m (560 ft)	35	FY2030	Bunkyo	
Sengakuji Area Urban Redevelopment Project	170 m (560 ft)	41	TBD	Minato	
Redevelopment of the southern district of Sotokanda 1-chome	170 m (560 ft)	TBD	TBD	Chiyoda 35°41′53.9016″N 139°46′13.1988″E	
Nishi-Nippori Station Area Redevelopment	170 m (560 ft)	46	2033	Arakawa 35°44′02.7″N 139°46′02.5″E	
Kudan Minami 1-chome District Redevelopment	170 m (560 ft)	32	2033	Chiyoda 35°41′42.4″N 139°45′08.0″E	

== Timeline of tallest buildings ==
This is a list of buildings that once held the title of tallest building in Tokyo. Currently, the title belongs to Azabudai Hills Mori JP Tower. However, the tallest structure is Tokyo Skytree. Since its completion in 2012, it has been the tallest structure in Tokyo as well as in Japan, overtaking Tokyo Tower.

Indicates buildings that once held the title of tallest building in Asia

Name	Image	Years as tallest	Height m (ft)	Floors	Ward	Notes
Ryōunkaku		1890–1923	69 (225)	12	Taitō	
Marunouchi Building (1923–1999)		1923–1936	33 (109)	8	Chiyoda	
National Diet Building		1936–1964	65 (215)	9	Chiyoda	
Hotel New Otani Tokyo		1964–1968	72 (237)	17	Chiyoda	
Kasumigaseki Building		1968–1970	156 (512)	36	Chiyoda	
World Trade Center Building (1st Generation)		1970–1971	163 (533)	40	Minato	
Keio Plaza Hotel North Tower		1971–1974	180 (589)	47	Shinjuku	
Shinjuku Sumitomo Building		1974–1974	210 (690)	52	Shinjuku	
Shinjuku Mitsui Building		1974–1978	225 (738)	55	Shinjuku	
Sunshine 60		1978–1991	240 (787)	60	Toshima	
Tokyo Metropolitan Government Building No. 1		1991–2007	243 (799)	48	Shinjuku	
Midtown Tower		2007–2014	248 (813)	54	Minato	
Toranomon Hills Mori Tower		2014–2023	256 (838)	52	Minato	
Azabudai Hills Mori JP Tower		2023–present	325 (1,068)	64	Minato	

== Tallest structures ==
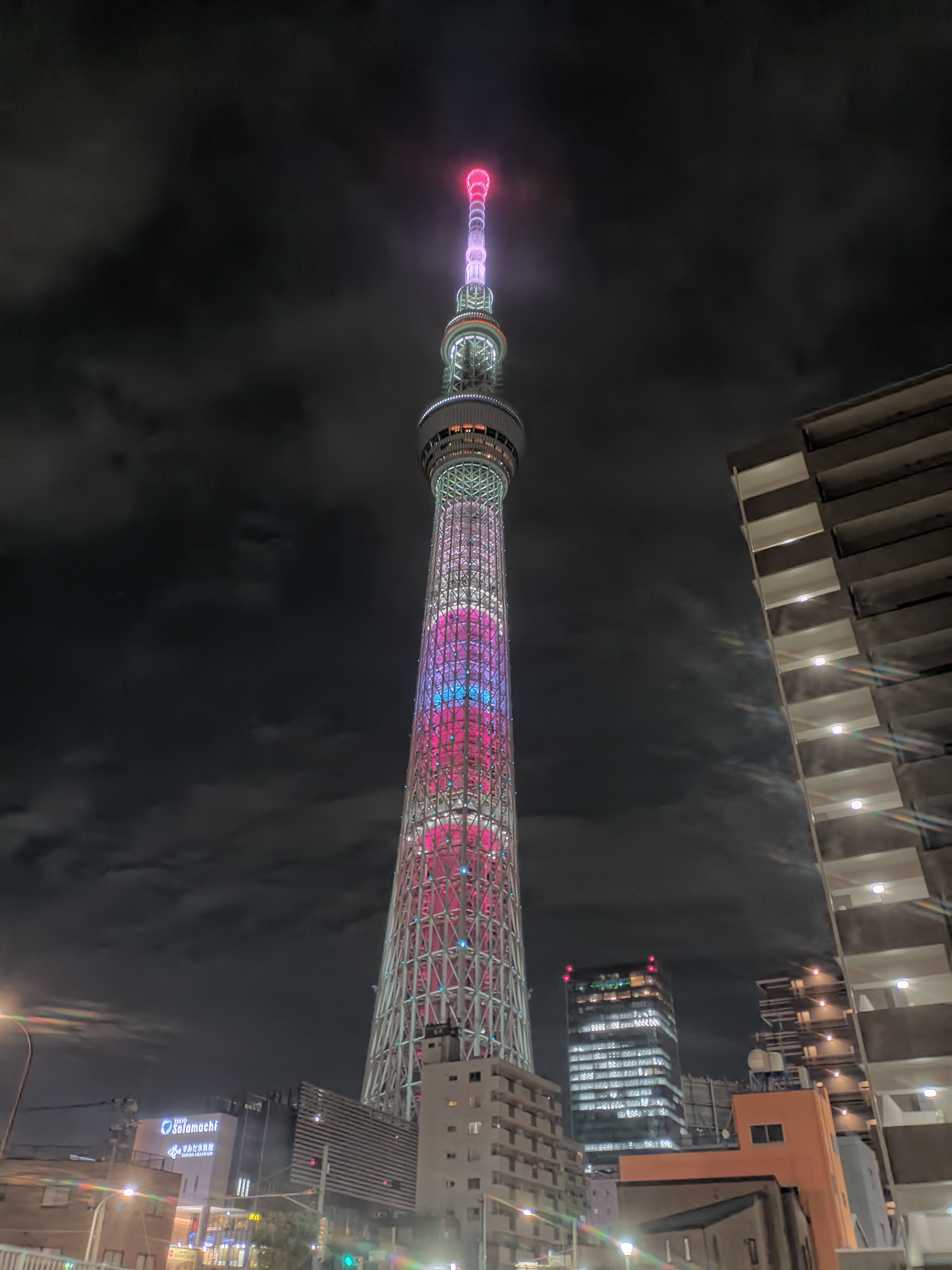
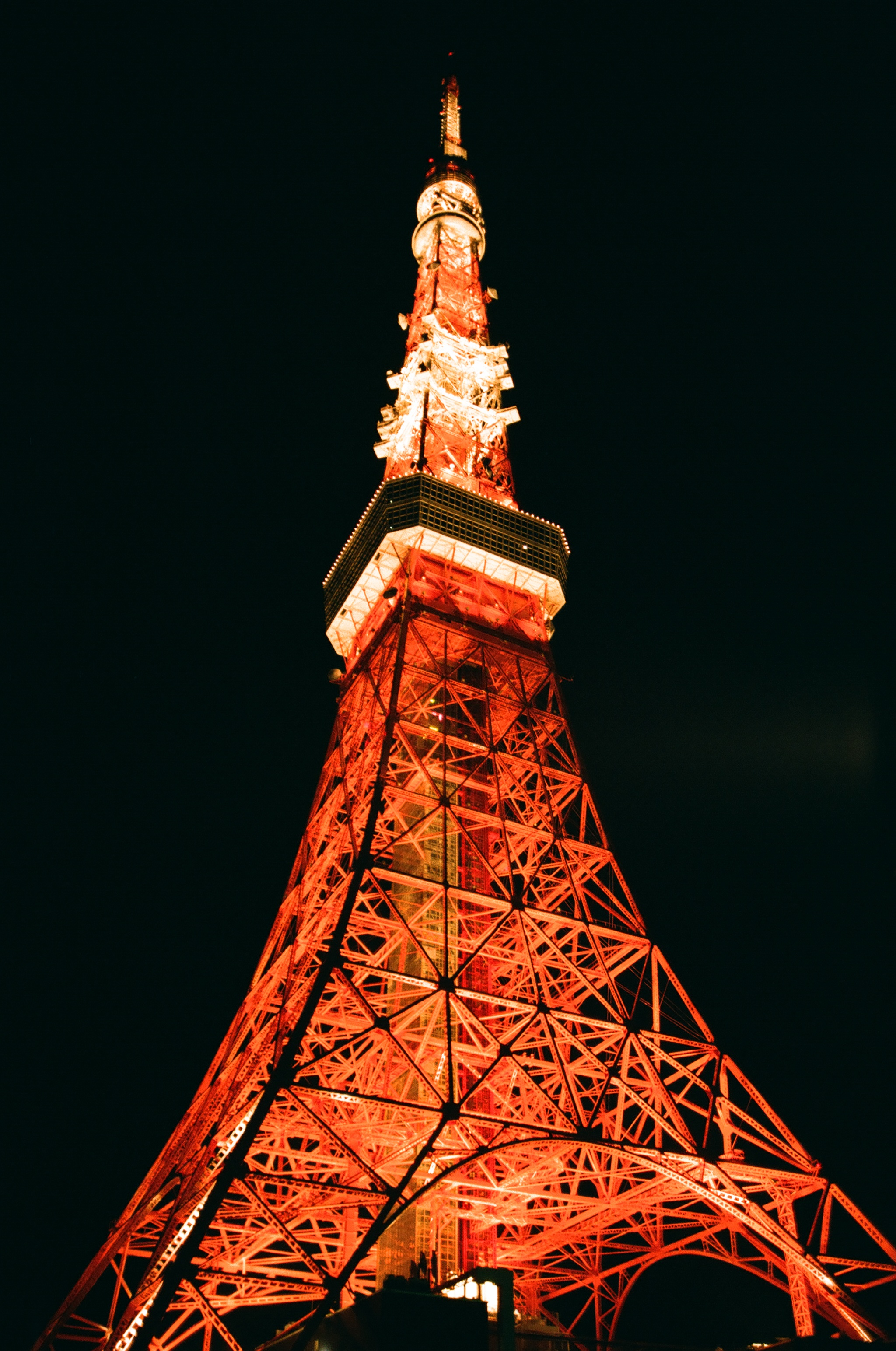
Tokyo Skytree and Tokyo Tower are not considered habitable structures, as they were built primarily for telecommunications and observation purposes. As such, they do not qualify as skyscrapers, but are the two tallest structures in Tokyo.

This list ranks Tokyo structures, including freestanding towers, smokestacks, and other non-habitable or partially habitable structures that stand at least 195 metres (640 feet) tall, based on standard height measurement. This height includes spires, architectural details, and antenna masts, corresponding to the pinnacle height. The "Year" column indicates the year in which a structure was completed.

Buildings are included only if their total height, including non-habitable structures like masts or lattice towers, is 195 metres or more, but their architectural or roof height without such additions does not meet the cut-off for the Tallest buildings list. Those that are at least 195 metres tall without the aid of non-habitable structures are excluded from this list, as they are eligible for the "50 tallest skyscrapers in Tokyo" ranking.

Rank	Name	Image	Height m (ft)	Floors	Year	Location	Structure type	Notes
1	Tokyo Skytree	Mid-level view of a tall, slender, gray structure	634 (2,080)	32	2012	Sumida 35°42′36.5″N 139°48′39″E	Lattice tower	Tallest tower in the world; Tallest structure in East Asia; Tallest structure to top out worldwide in the 2010s; Observation decks are located at approx. 350 and 450 m (1,150 and 1,480 ft) high; The 158-metre (518-foot) East Tower is part of the complex
2	Tokyo Tower	Ground-level view of an orange and white lattice frame; the structure curves and widens near the bottom and comes to a point at the top	333 (1,092)	7	1958	Minato 35°39′31″N 139°44′44″E	Lattice tower	Tallest 4-sided lattice tower in the world; Tallest tower in the world at the time of its completion; Tallest freestanding structure completed in the world in the 1950s; Observation decks are located at 150 and 250 m (490 and 820 ft) high; however, SkyscraperPage claims the real heights are 125 and 225 m (410 and 738 ft); 24th-tallest tower in the world
3	Ministry of Defense Ichigaya Building B		220 (722)	10	1996	Shinjuku 35°41′36″N 139°43′36.5″E	Building with a lattice tower	Tallest structure in Ichigaya-Honmuracho; Roof height: 50 metres (160 feet); pinnacle height: 220 metres (720 feet)
4	Nittele Tower	Ground-level view of a blue, glass, rectangular high-rise; attached to one side of the building are two structures consisting of poles that run the height of the building	218 (715)	32	2003	Minato 35°39′52.7″N 139°45′35.6″E	Building with masts	Tallest structure in Higashi-Shinbashi and Shiodome; Architectural height: 193 m (633 ft); It features the NTV Big Clock designed by Hayao Miyazaki
5	Toshima Incineration Plant	Ground-level view of a tall, white, angular chimney rising from a brown, striped building	210 (689)	11	1999	Toshima 35°44′4.8″N 139°42′51.9″E	Chimney	Tallest incinerator chimney in the world; Tallest structure in Kami-Ikebukuro
6	TEPCO Building	The TEPCO head office	200 (656)	22	1997	Chiyoda 35°40′12.9″N 139°45′30.8″E	Building with a lattice tower	Tallest structure in Uchisaiwaichō; Roof height: 60 metres (200 feet); Height of first tower or spire: 102 metres (335 feet); pinnacle height: 200 metres (660 feet); To be demolished: Tokyo Cross Park will be developed on its site
7	Sky Tower West Tokyo	Ground-level view of a cluttered lattice structure	195 (640)	—	1989	Nishitōkyō^{[C]} 35°44′6.5″N 139°31′22.5″E	Lattice tower	Tallest structure in Western Tokyo

=== Demolished or destroyed structures ===
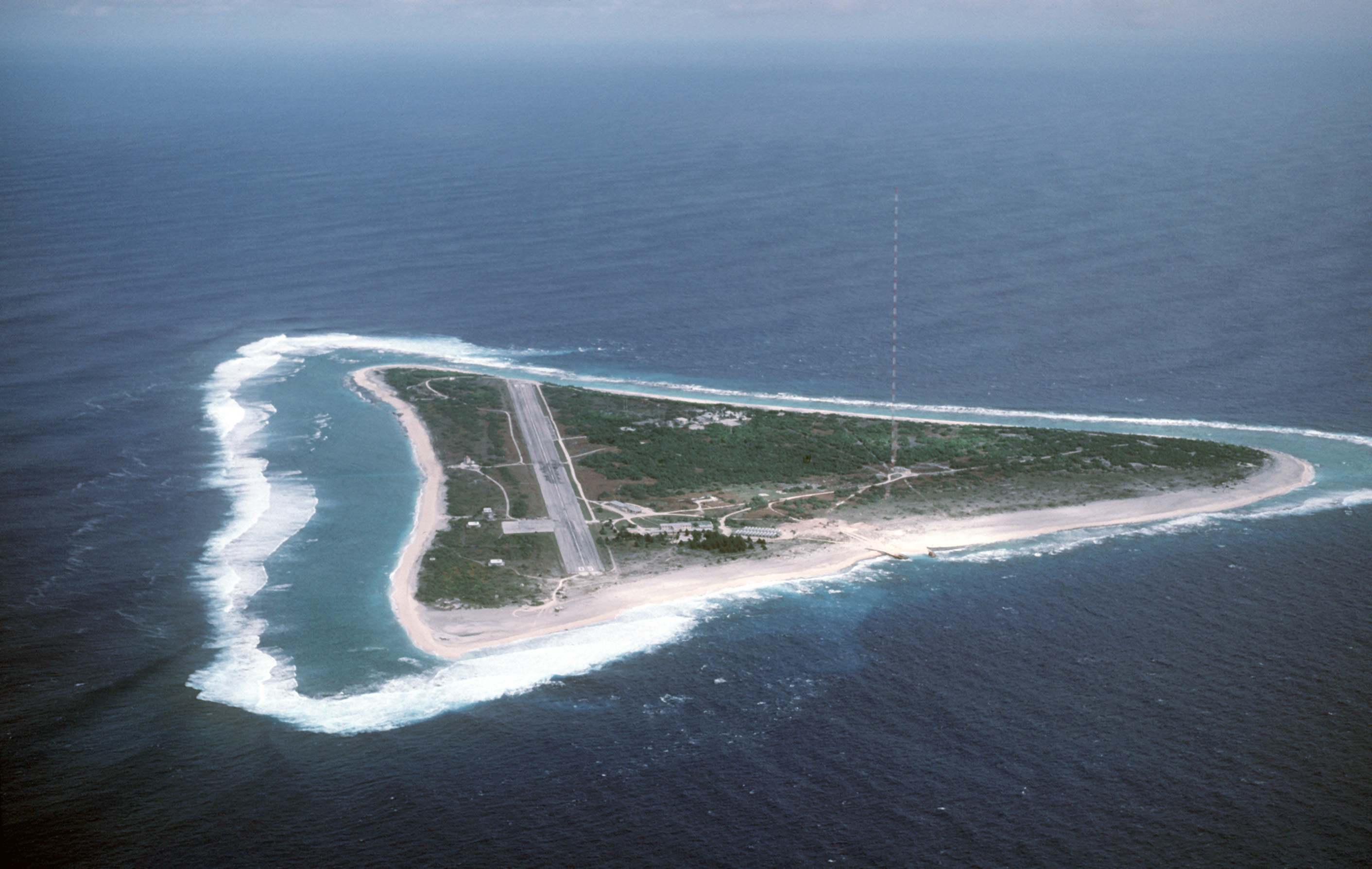
The 2nd Marcus Island LORAN-C transmission mast was only half as tall as the previous mast it replaced.

This table lists non-habitable or partially habitable structures that have been demolished or destroyed in Tokyo, including the remote islands of Iwo Jima and Minami-Torishima (Marcus Island), and once rose approximately 100 metres (330 feet) or taller, based on standard height measurement. The "Year built" column indicates the year in which a structure was completed, while the "Year demolished" column indicates the year in which demolition work was finished. If the year in which a structure was fully demolished is unknown, the year demolition started is provided instead. Structures currently being demolished are also included, as well as those that are planned to be demolished.

Indicates structures currently being demolished
Indicates structures that are planned to be demolished

Name	Image	Height m (ft)	Year built	Year demolished	Location	Structure type	Notes
1st Iwo Jima LORAN-C transmission mast	—	412 (1,350)	1963	1965	Iwo Jima^{[D]} 24°48′0.8″N 141°19′32″E	guyed mast	Collapsed and replaced
1st Marcus Island LORAN-C transmission mast	—	412 (1,350)	1964	1985	Marcus Island^{[B]} 24°17′0.8″N 153°58′54″E	guyed mast	Dismantled and replaced by smaller one
2nd Iwo Jima LORAN-C transmission mast	2nd Iwo Jima LORAN-C transmission mast	412 (1,350)	1965	1993	Iwo Jima^{[D]} 24°48′0.8″N 141°19′32″E	guyed mast	Dismantled
2nd Marcus Island LORAN-C transmission mast	2nd Marcus Island LORAN-C transmission mast	213 (700)	1986	2000	Marcus Island^{[B]} 24°17′0.8″N 153°58′54″E	guyed mast	Dismantled and replaced
3rd Marcus Island LORAN-C transmission mast	—	213 (699)	2000	2010	Marcus Island^{[B]} 24°17′0.8″N 153°58′54″E	guyed mast	Dismantled
TEPCO Building	TEPCO Building	200 (656)	1997	TBD	Chiyoda 35°40′12.9″N 139°45′30.8″E	Building with a lattice tower	Tallest structure in Uchisaiwaichō; Roof height: 60 metres (200 feet); Height of first tower or spire: 102 metres (335 feet); pinnacle height: 200 metres (660 feet); To be demolished: Tokyo Cross Park will be developed on its site
Suginami Incineration Plant	Suginami Incineration Plant	160 (525)	1982	2012*	Suginami 35°41′1.29″N 139°37′1.8″E	Chimney	A new 160-metre (520-foot) smokestack was built on its site
Hikarigaoka Incineration Plant	Hikarigaoka Incineration Plant	150 (492)	1983	2016*	Nerima 35°45′43.8″N 139°37′41.9″E	Chimney	A new 150-metre (490-foot) smokestack was built on its site
Meguro Incineration Plant	Meguro Incineration Plant	150 (492)	1991	2017*	Meguro 35°38′17.69″N 139°42′25.44″E	Chimney	A new 150-metre (490-foot) smokestack was built on its site
Edogawa Incineration Plant	Edogawa Incineration Plant	150 (492)	1997	2023	Edogawa 35°41′4.03″N 139°54′17.34″E	Chimney	A new 150-metre (490-foot) smokestack is under construction on its site
Kita Incineration Plant	Kita Incineration Plant	120 (394)	1998	2026	Kita 35°46′30.7″N 139°43′53.4″E	Chimney	Currently being demolished: a new smokestack will be built on its site
Palette Town Giant Ferris Wheel (Daikanransha)	Daikanransha	115 (377)	1999	2022	Kōtō 35°37′34.9″N 139°46′56.2″E	Ferris wheel	Tallest Ferris Wheel in the world upon completion; Closed in August 2022

* Indicates the year in which demolition work began

== See also ==
- List of tallest structures in Japan
- List of tallest structures envisioned for Tokyo

== Notes ==
A. This structure is not a habitable building but is included in this list for comparative purposes. Per a ruling by the Council on Tall Buildings and Urban Habitat, freestanding observation towers, chimneys or masts are not considered to be buildings, as they are not fully habitable structures.
B. Marcus Island is not within the special wards of Tokyo. Administratively, the island is part of Ogasawara, Tokyo.
C. Nishitōkyō is not within the special wards of Tokyo. It is one of the 30 cities, towns and villages included in Western Tokyo.
D. Iwo Jima is not within the special wards of Tokyo. Administratively, the island is part of Ogasawara, Tokyo.
