= Toyosu Ciel Tower =

Residential building in Tokyo, Japan

- Interactive map of the Toyosu Ciel Tower area

General information
- Status: Completed
- Location: 2-67, 5 Toyosu, Koto, Tokyo, Japan
- Coordinates: 35.653725°N 139.796280°E
- Construction started: 2003
- Completed: September 2006

Height
- Roof: 144.35 m (473.6 ft)
- Top floor: 133.6 m (438 ft)

Technical details
- Floor count: 40 above ground 1 below ground
- Floor area: 65,489 m^{2} (704,920 sq ft)

Other information
- Number of rooms: 560

The Toyosu Ciel Tower (豊洲シエルタワー) is a residential building in the Koto special ward of Tokyo, Japan. Completed in September 2006, it stands at 144.4 m (474 ft) tall.

== See also ==
- List of tallest structures in Tokyo
