= List of tallest structures envisioned for Tokyo =

Tokyo is the most populated of Japan's 47 prefectures. With around 14 million inhabitants in the prefecture and 40 million in the Metropolitan area as of 2024, Tokyo ranks among the largest metropolises in the world. Despite Japan being the country with the highest average age globally in 2024 (excluding the city-state of Monaco and Saint Pierre and Miquelon), according to The World Factbook, and experiencing negative population growth, the country underwent a period of rapid population growth after World War II, particularly in the capital, Tokyo. This growth gave rise to several megaprojects aimed at addressing ecological issues and space shortages caused by overpopulation. This article lists visionary megaprojects announced during the 1980s and 1990s, coinciding with Japan's asset price bubble period, as well as more recent projects with heights of 300 meters or more.

== Tallest visionary structures ==
This table lists visionary construction projects, also referred to as 'visions' by the Council on Tall Buildings and Urban Habitat (CTBUH), with heights of at least 300 meters (980 feet).

Name	Height m (ft)	Floors	Start	Finish	Location (Ward)	Notes
Tokyo Tower of Babel	10 km	1969	—	—	—	Structure type: arcology
X-Seed 4000	4000	800	—	—	—	Structure type: arcology
TRY-2004	2004	400	—	—	—	
Aeropolis 2001	2001	500	—	—	—	Structure type: skyscraper /arcology
Sky Mile Tower	1700	—	—	2045	—	
M.O.T.H.E.R.	1321	220	—	—	—	Structure type: arcology
The Spiral	1000	200	—	—	—	
Sky City 1000	1000	196	—	—	—	Structure type: arcology
Hyper Building	1000	—	—	—	—	
Millenium Tower	840	180	—	2009	—	
DIB-200	800	200	—	—	—	
Holonic Tower	600	120	—	—	—	
Shimizu Super High Rise	550	—	—	—	—	
W350	350	70	—	2041	Chiyoda	Research project that aims to make wooden supertall skyscrapers possible by 2041

== See also ==
- List of visionary tall buildings and structures
- List of tallest structures in Tokyo
- List of tallest structures in Japan
