= Brillia Tower Tokyo =

Residential building in Tokyo, Japan

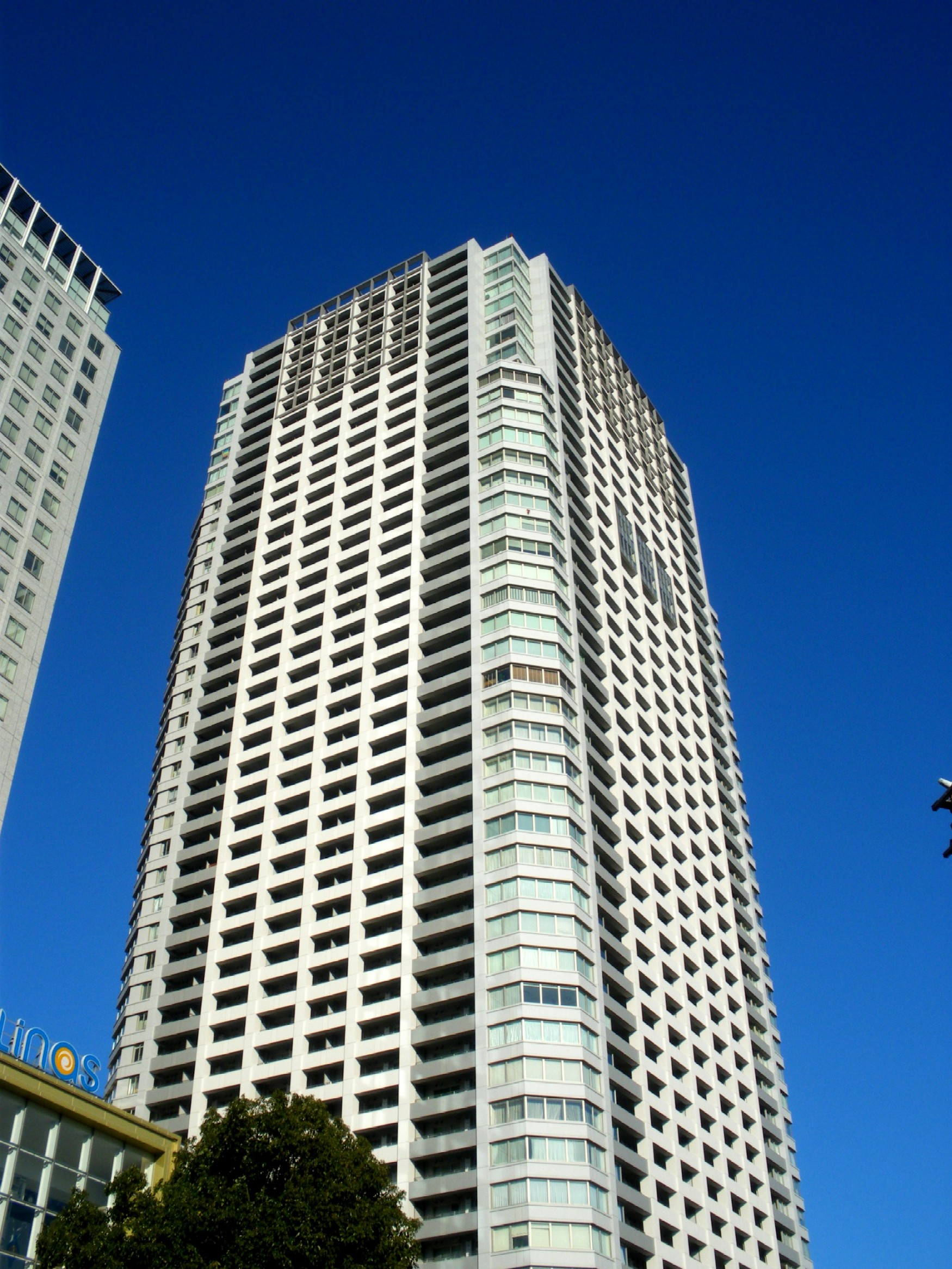

General information
- Status: Completed
- Location: 2-1, 4 Taihei, Sumida, Tokyo, Japan
- Coordinates: 35.700439°N 139.816116°E
- Construction started: December 16, 2002
- Completed: June 2006

Height
- Roof: 159 m (522 ft)

Technical details
- Floor count: 45 above ground 2 below ground
- Floor area: 90,308 m^{2} (972,070 sq ft)
- Lifts/elevators: 12

Design and construction
- Architect: Kume Sekkei Co., Ltd.
- Main contractor: Taisei Corporation

Other information
- Number of rooms: 644
- Parking: 396 spaces

The Brillia Tower Tokyo (Brilliaタワー東京) is a residential building in the Sumida special ward of Tokyo, Japan. Completed in June 2006, it reaches a height of 159 m (522 ft).

== See also ==
- List of tallest structures in Tokyo
