= Station Garden Tower =

Mixed-use building in Tokyo, Japan

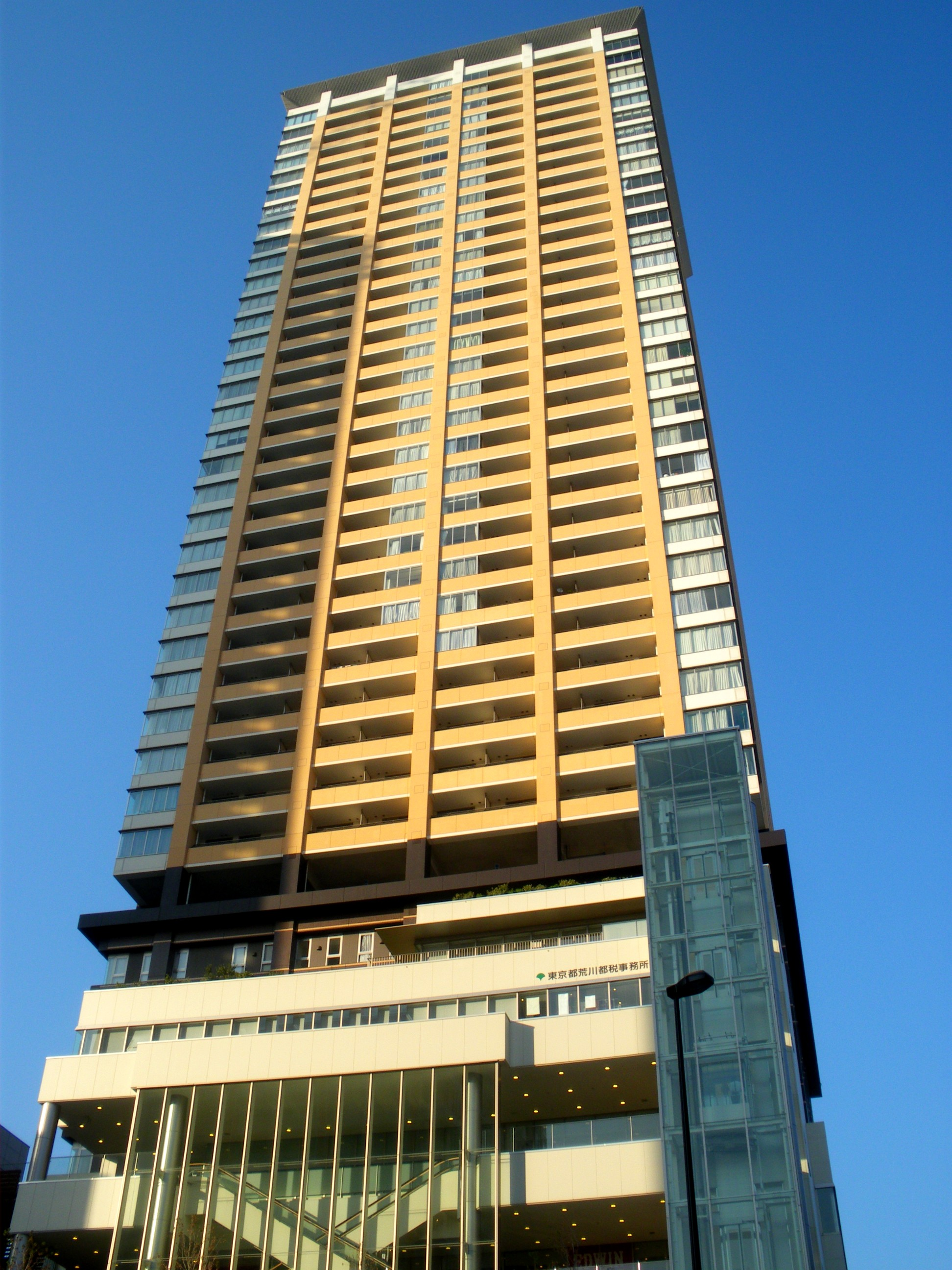

General information
- Status: Completed
- Location: 24/25, 2 Nishi-Nippori, Arakawa, Tokyo, Japan
- Coordinates: 35.729507°N 139.771484°E
- Construction started: 2004
- Completed: April 2008

Height
- Roof: 153 m (502 ft)
- Top floor: 145.7 m (478 ft)

Technical details
- Floor count: 40 above ground 2 below ground
- Floor area: 52,801.46 m^{2} (568,350.2 sq ft)

Design and construction
- Architect: Nihon Sekkei, Inc.
- Main contractor: Nishimatsu Construction Co., Ltd.

Other information
- Number of rooms: 340
- Parking: 54 spaces

The Station Garden Tower (サンマークシティ日暮里ステーションガーデンタワー) is a mixed-use building in the Arakawa special ward of Tokyo, Japan. Completed in April 2008, it stands at 153 m (502 ft) tall.

== See also ==
- List of tallest structures in Tokyo
