= Century Park Tower =

Residential building in Tokyo, Japan

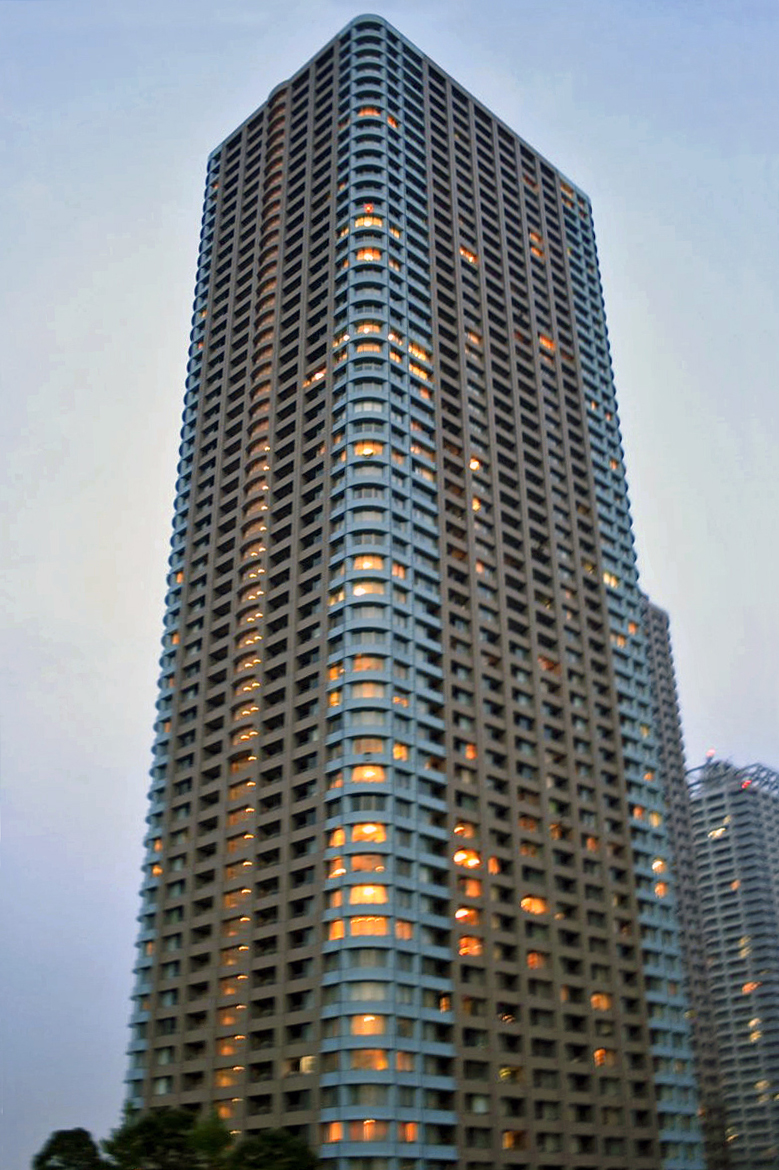
- Interactive map of the Century Park Tower area

General information
- Status: Completed
- Location: 1, Tsukuda 2, Chūō, Tokyo, Japan
- Coordinates: 35.670702°N 139.785581°E
- Construction started: 1995
- Completed: March 1999

Height
- Roof: 180.1 m (591 ft)

Technical details
- Floor count: 54 above ground 3 below ground

Design and construction
- Architect: Nihon Sekkei
- Developer: Mitsui Fudosan Co. Ltd.
- Main contractor: Taisei Corporation

Other information
- Number of rooms: 756

The Century Park Tower (センチュリーパークタワー), also known as River City 21 M, is a residential building in the River City 21 building complex in the Chūō special ward of Tokyo, Japan. Completed in March 1999, it is 180 m (590 ft) tall. It is the 45th tallest building in Tokyo and the 66th tallest building in Japan.

== See also ==
- List of tallest structures in Tokyo
