= Kachidoki View Tower =

Skyscraper in Japan

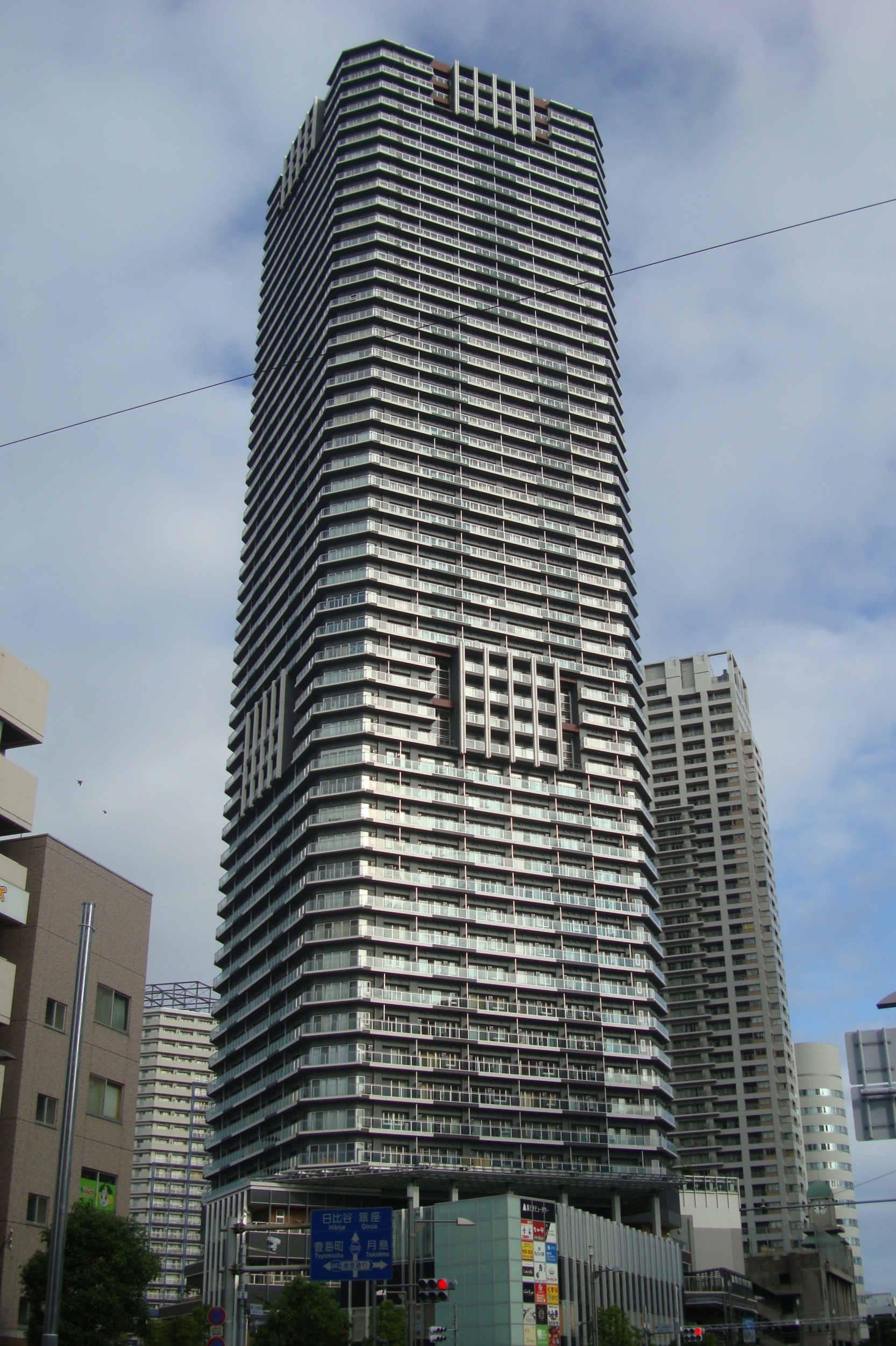
- Interactive map of the Kachidoki View Tower area

General information
- Status: Completed
- Location: 8-11, 1 Kachidok Chuo, Tokyo, Japan
- Coordinates: 35.659397°N 139.776627°E
- Construction started: 2007
- Completed: August 2010

Height
- Roof: 192.2 m (631 ft)

Technical details
- Floor count: 55 above ground 2 below ground
- Floor area: 86,900 m^{2} (935,000 sq ft)

Other information
- Number of rooms: 710

The Kachidoki View Tower (勝どきビュータワー) is a mixed-use building in the Chuo special ward of Tokyo, Japan. Completed in August 2010, it stands at 192.2 (631 ft) tall.

== See also ==
- List of tallest structures in Tokyo
