= Marunouchi Park Building =

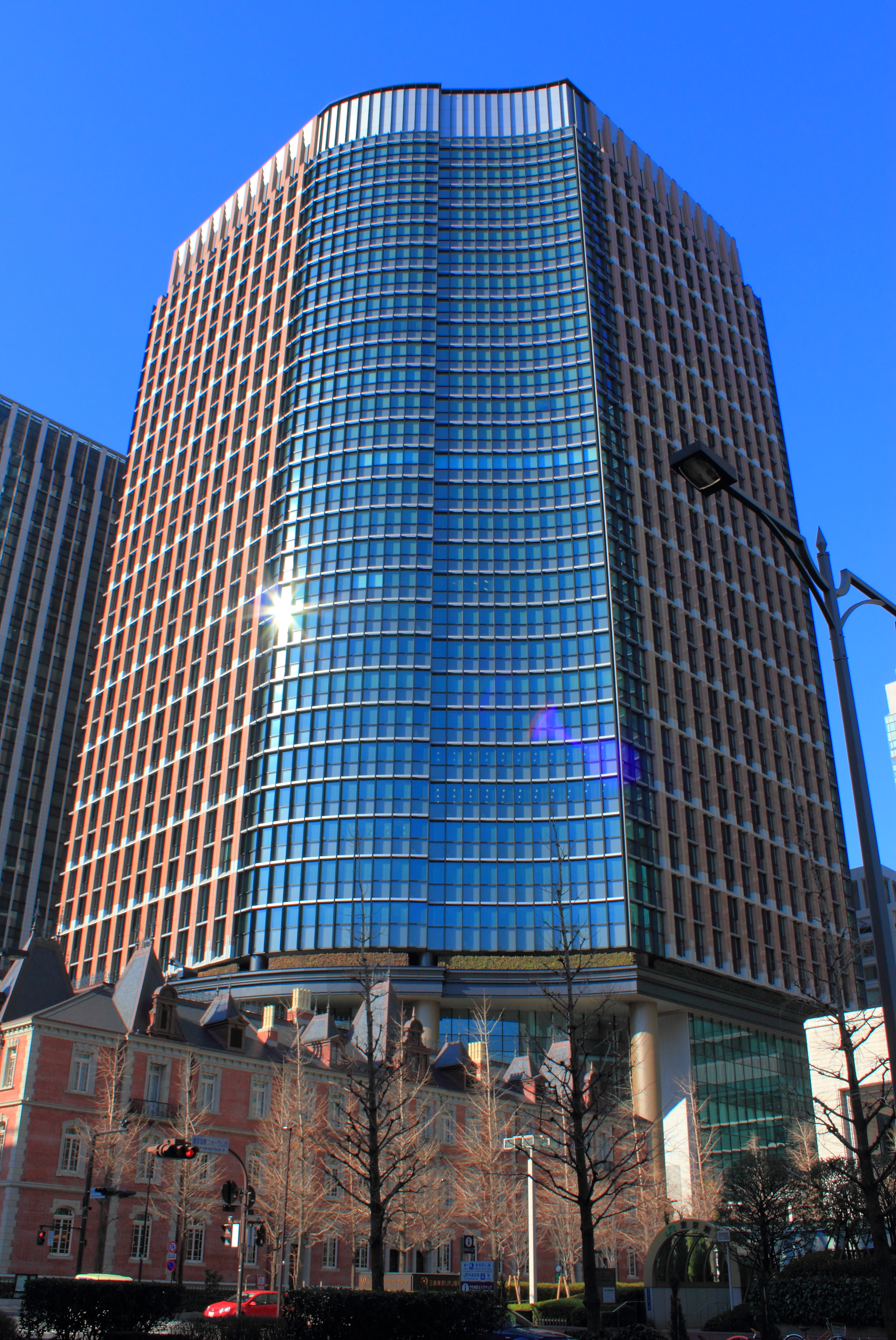

General information
- Status: Completed
- Type: Office
- Location: 6-1, 2 Marunouchi, Chiyoda, Tokyo, Japan
- Coordinates: 35.679096°N 139.763107°E
- Construction started: February 5, 2007
- Completed: April 30, 2009

Height
- Roof: 170.1 m (558 ft)
- Top floor: 157.1 m (515 ft)

Technical details
- Floor count: 35 above ground 4 below ground
- Floor area: 190,512 m^{2} (2,050,650 sq ft)

Design and construction
- Architect: Mitsubishi Jisho Sekkei Inc.

Other information
- Parking: 282 spaces

The Marunouchi Park Building (丸の内パークビルディング) is an office building in the Chiyoda, Tokyo, Japan. Completed on April 30, 2009, it stands at 170 m (558 ft) tall. Along with the Mitsubishi Shoji Building, it houses the head office of the Mitsubishi Corporation.

== See also ==
- List of tallest structures in Tokyo
