= Marcus Island LORAN-C transmitter =

Mast radiator in Minami-Tori-shima, Japan

Marcus Island LORAN-C Mast (1st) Island) overview with transmitter
- Interactive map of the Marcus Island LORAN-C Mast (1st) Island) overview with transmitter area

General information
- Status: Dismantled
- Type: Mast radiator insulated against ground
- Location: Minami-Tori-shima (Marcus Island), Japan
- Completed: 1963
- Destroyed: 1985

Height
- Height: 76 m (249 ft)

Marcus Island LORAN-C Mast (2nd)
- Interactive map of the Marcus Island LORAN-C Mast (2nd) area

General information
- Status: Dismantled
- Type: Mast radiator insulated against ground
- Location: Minami-Tori-shima (Marcus Island), Japan
- Completed: 1986
- Destroyed: 2000

Height
- Height: 21.4 m (70 ft)

Marcus Island LORAN-C Mast (3rd)
- Interactive map of the Marcus Island LORAN-C Mast (3rd) area

General information
- Status: Dismantled
- Type: Mast radiator insulated against ground
- Location: Minami-Tori-shima (Marcus Island), Japan
- Completed: 2000
- Destroyed: 2010

Height
- Height: 76 m (249.34 ft)

Design and construction
- Main contractor: Japan Self-Defense Forces

Marcus Island LORAN-C transmitter, or Minami Torishima LORAN-C transmitter, is a former LORAN-C transmitter on Minami-Tori-shima (Marcus Island) in Ogasawara, Tokyo, Japan at (24°17′8″N 153°58′54″E). Until 1993 it was part of Grid 9970 and used a transmission power of 4000 kilowatts, which was more than the most powerful broadcasting stations ever used.

Until 1985 Marcus Island LORAN-C transmitter had a 411.5-meter (1,350 ft) tall guyed mast radiator as an antenna, which was built in 1964. In 1985/86 this tower was replaced by a 213.4 m-tall (700 ft) tall tower.

In October 1993 the authority over the transmitter was transferred from the United States Coast Guard to the Japan Coast Guard. In 2000 the tower of the station was again dismantled and replaced by a new one with a height of 213 meters.

Marcus Island LORAN-C transmitter was the X-Ray secondary station of the North West Pacific LORAN-C Chain GRI 8930. Its transmission power was reduced to 1100 kilowatts.

On December 1, 2009, the station was abolished due to a decline in users. The mast has been demolished.

== See also ==
- List of masts
