= Hikarigaoka Incineration Plant =

Coordinates: 35.7615°N 139.6283°E

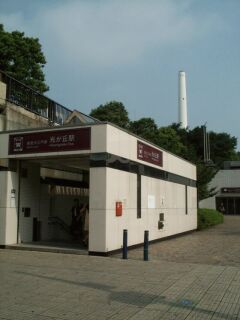
Hikarigaoka Incineration Plant smokestack seen in the back, before reconstruction.

The Hikarigaoka Incineration Plant (光が丘清掃工場, Hikarigaoka Seisō Kōjō) is a waste incineration facility managed by the Clean Authority of Tokyo, located in Hikarigaoka, Nerima, Tokyo.

== Overview ==
The facility has an incineration capacity of 300 tons per day. It generates electricity using a 9,000 kW steam turbine generator and supplies district heating in the form of steam and hot water. The chimney, standing 150 meters tall, is the tallest structure in Nerima Ward. The previous facility also featured a 150-meter chimney. The plant is adjacent to Hikarigaoka Park and Nerima Hikarigaoka Hospital. Another incineration plant, the Nerima Incineration Plant, is also located within the ward.

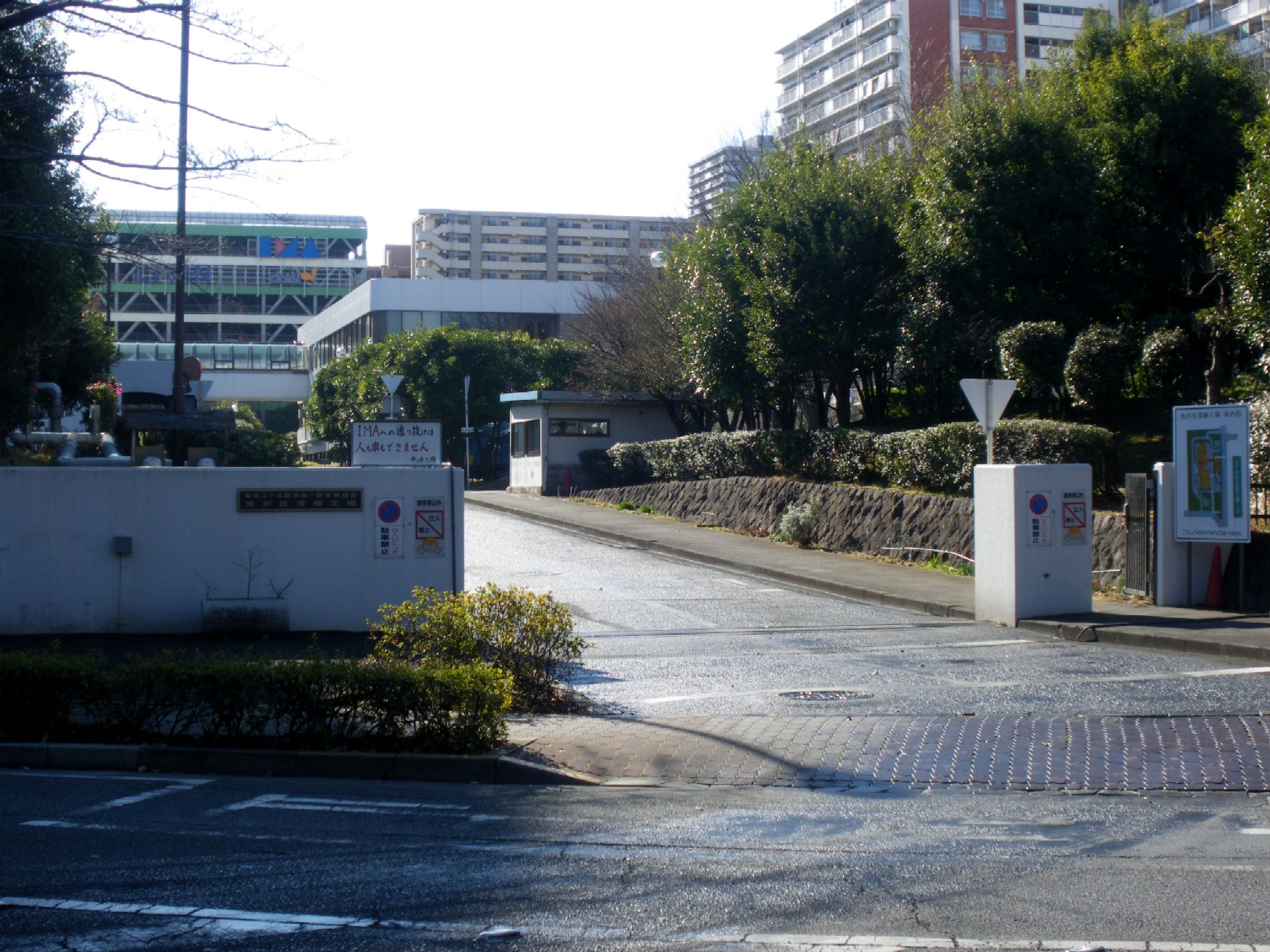
Hikarigaoka Incineration Plant facilities before reconstruction.

== History ==
- September 30, 1973: The site was fully returned from U.S. military control
- 1981: Construction of the old facility began
- 1983: Completion of the old facility
- 2013: A redevelopment plan for the plant was formulated
- 2016: Demolition of the old facility began
- December 26, 2018: During redevelopment, a temporary tent measuring 150 m x 77.3 m x 45.9 m was recognized by the Guinness World Records as the largest negative-pressure sealed tent in the world
- March 15, 2021: The new plant was completed
