= Shinjuku Nomura Building =

Skyscraper located in Tokyo

- 新宿野村ビルディング
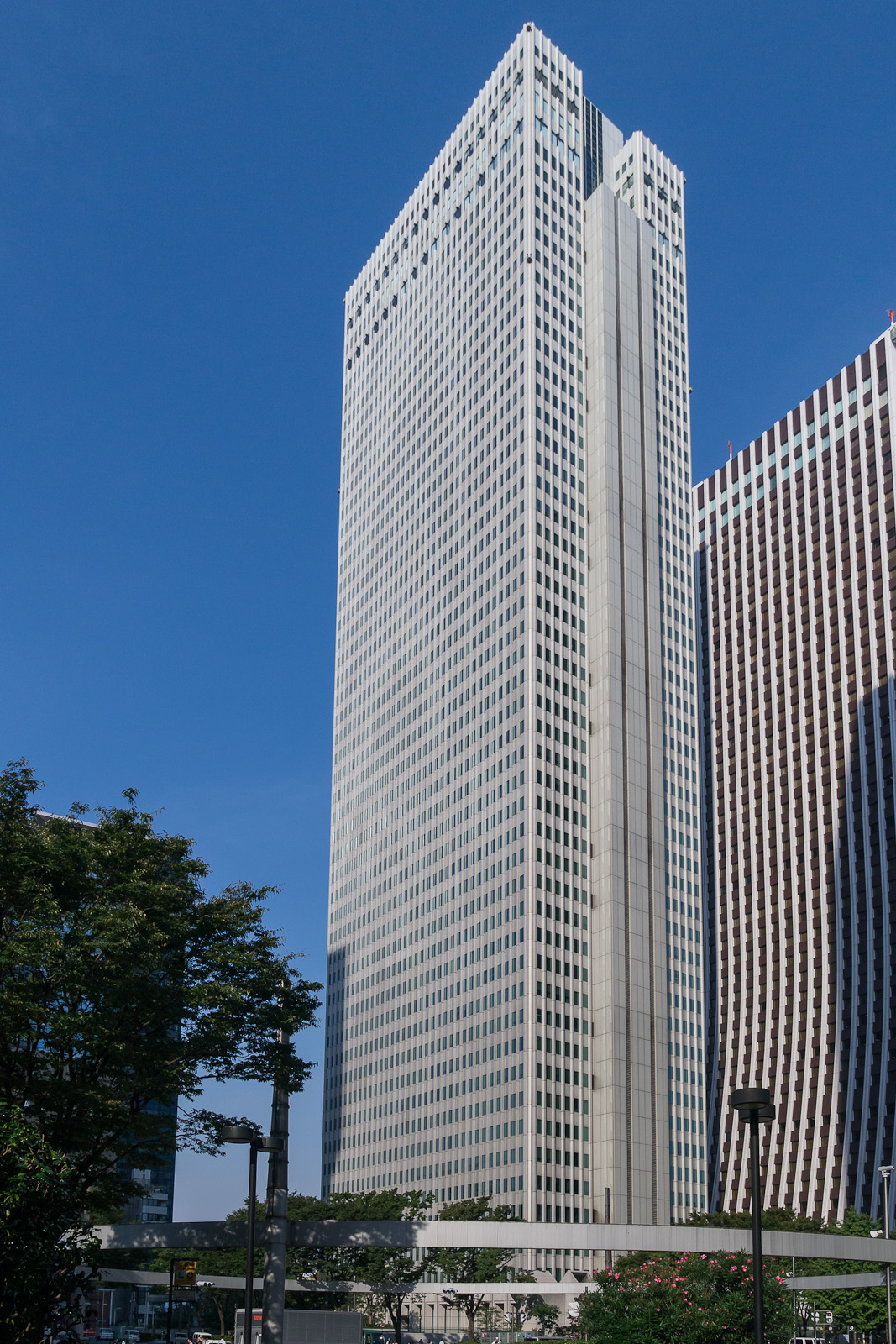
- Interactive map of the Shinjuku Nomura Building area

General information
- Location: Shinjuku, Tokyo, Japan
- Coordinates: 35°41′34″N 139°41′43″E

Height
- Architectural: 209.9 m (689 ft)
- Tip: 209.9 m (689 ft)

Technical details
- Floor count: 55
- Lifts/elevators: 28

Design and construction
- Architecture firm: Yasui Architects & Engineers
- Main contractor: Kumagai Gumi

Other information
- Parking: 330 parking spaces

Website
- Official website

The Shinjuku Nomura Building (新宿野村ビルディング) is a skyscraper located in the Nishi-Shinjuku business district in Shinjuku, Tokyo, Japan. Construction of the 209-metre, 50-storey skyscraper was finished in 1978. The building has a free observation deck on the top floor.

== Tenants ==
Keihin Corporation, an automotive components manufacturer has its global headquarters in the building.
