= Royal Park Shiodome Tower =

Skyscraper in Tokyo, Japan

Coordinates: 35.6643°N 139.7606°E

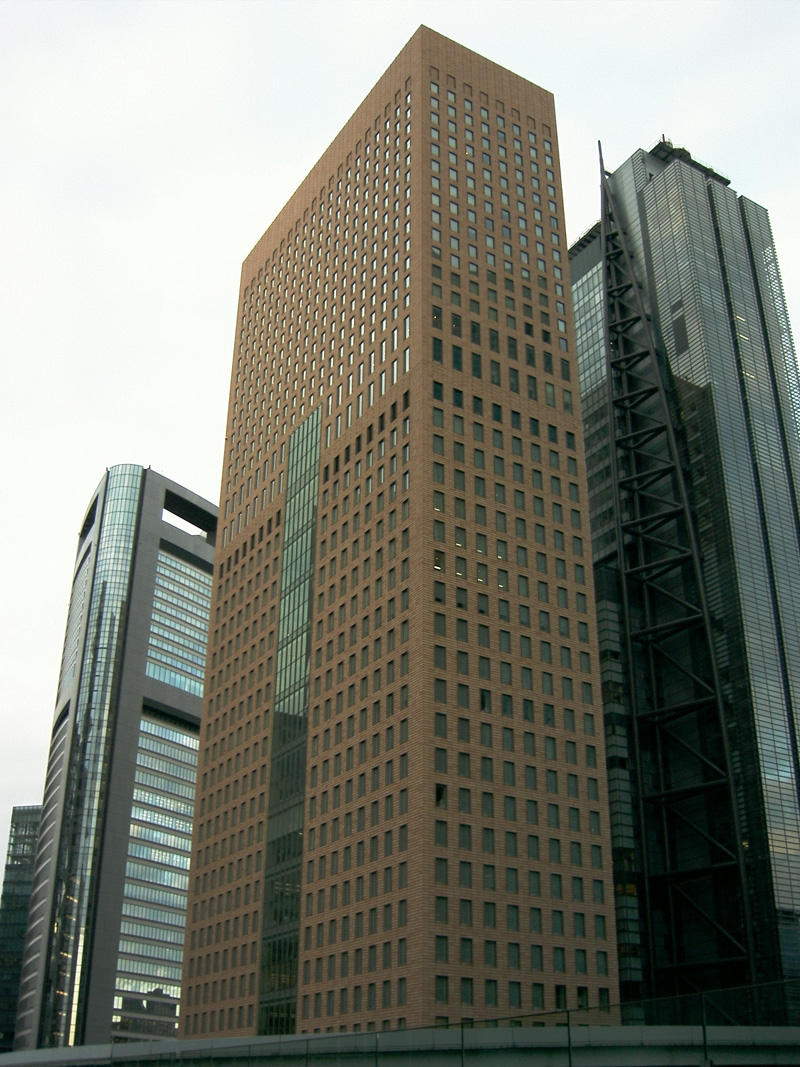
Royal Park Shiodome Tower in 2007

The Royal Park Shiodome Tower (ロイヤルパーク汐留タワー) is a skyscraper located in Minato, Tokyo, Japan. Construction of the 172-meter skyscraper was finished in 2003.
