= Shinjuku I-Land Tower =

- 新宿アイランドタワー
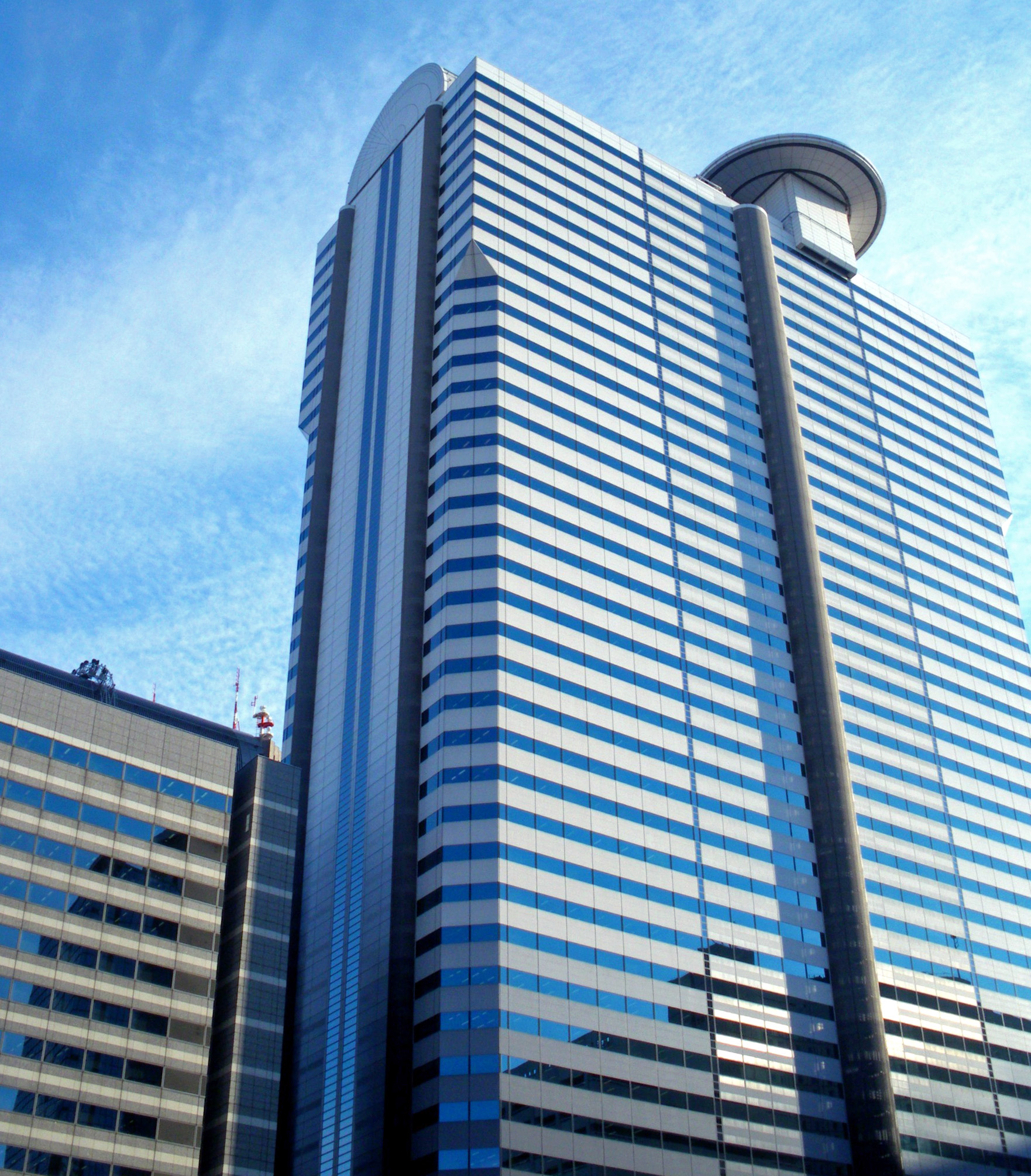
- Shinjuku I-Land Tower

- Location within Special wards of Tokyo

General information
- Status: Completed
- Type: Skyscraper
- Architectural style: Modernism
- Classification: Offices
- Location: Shinjuku Skyscraper District, 6-5-1 Nishi-Shinjuku, Tokyo, Japan
- Coordinates: 35.692971°N 139.693143°E
- Construction started: 1990
- Completed: 1995

Height
- Architectural: 620.08 feet (189.00 m)
- Tip: 620.08 feet (189.00 m)
- Roof: 620.08 feet (189.00 m)

Technical details
- Material: Steel; Concrete
- Floor count: 48 (44 above & 4 below ground)
- Floor area: 2,326,727 square feet (216,160.0 m^{2})
- Lifts/elevators: More 34

Design and construction
- Architect: Nihon Sekkei
- Architecture firm: Nihon Sekkei, Inc.
- Main contractor: Maeda Corporation

Other information
- Parking: 711

The Shinjuku I-Land Tower (新宿アイランドタワー) is an office skyscraper located in Shinjuku, Tokyo, Japan. Construction of the 620.08 feet (189.00 m), 44-storey skyscraper construction began in 1990 and was finished in 1995.

In front of the tower, a red "LOVE" sculpture by Robert Indiana is installed.
