= Shinjuku Oak Tower =

Skyscraper in Tokyo, Japan

Coordinates: 35°41′28.7″N 139°41′33″E

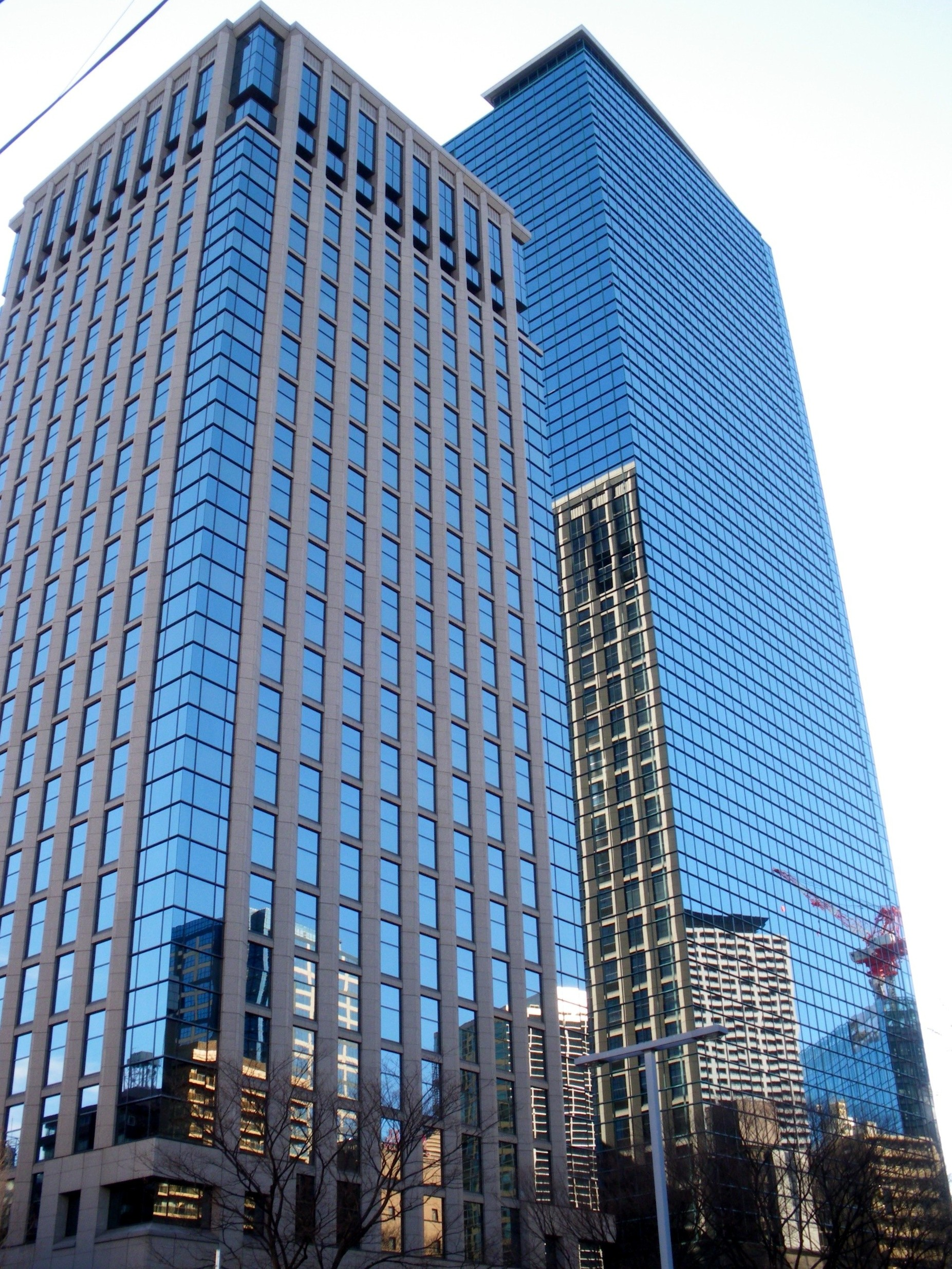
Shinjuku Oak Tower

The Shinjuku Oak Tower (新宿オークタワー) is a skyscraper located in Shinjuku, Tokyo, Japan. Construction of the 184-metre, 38-storey skyscraper was finished in 2002.
