= List of tallest structures in Japan =

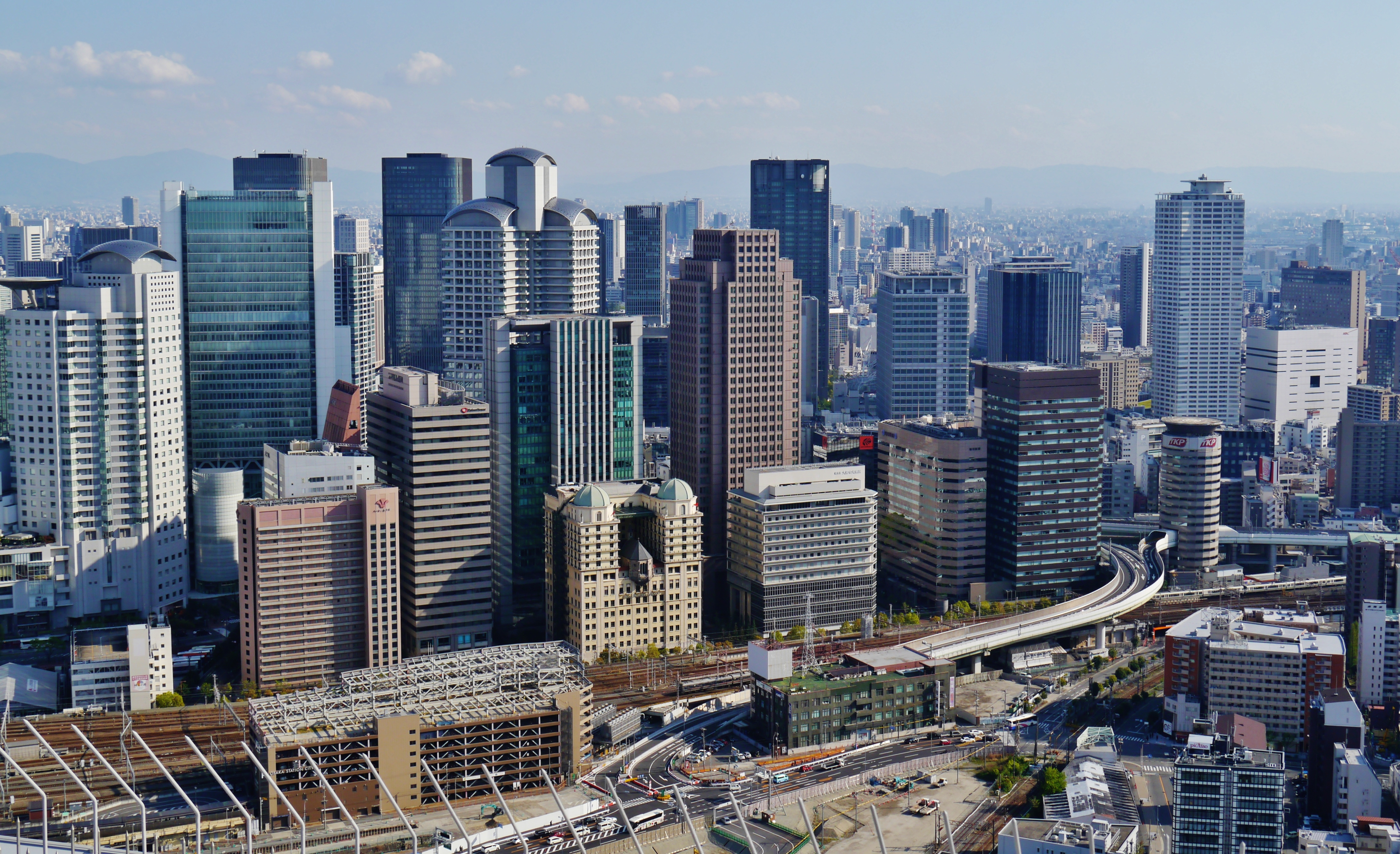
Osaka skyline, Umeda district

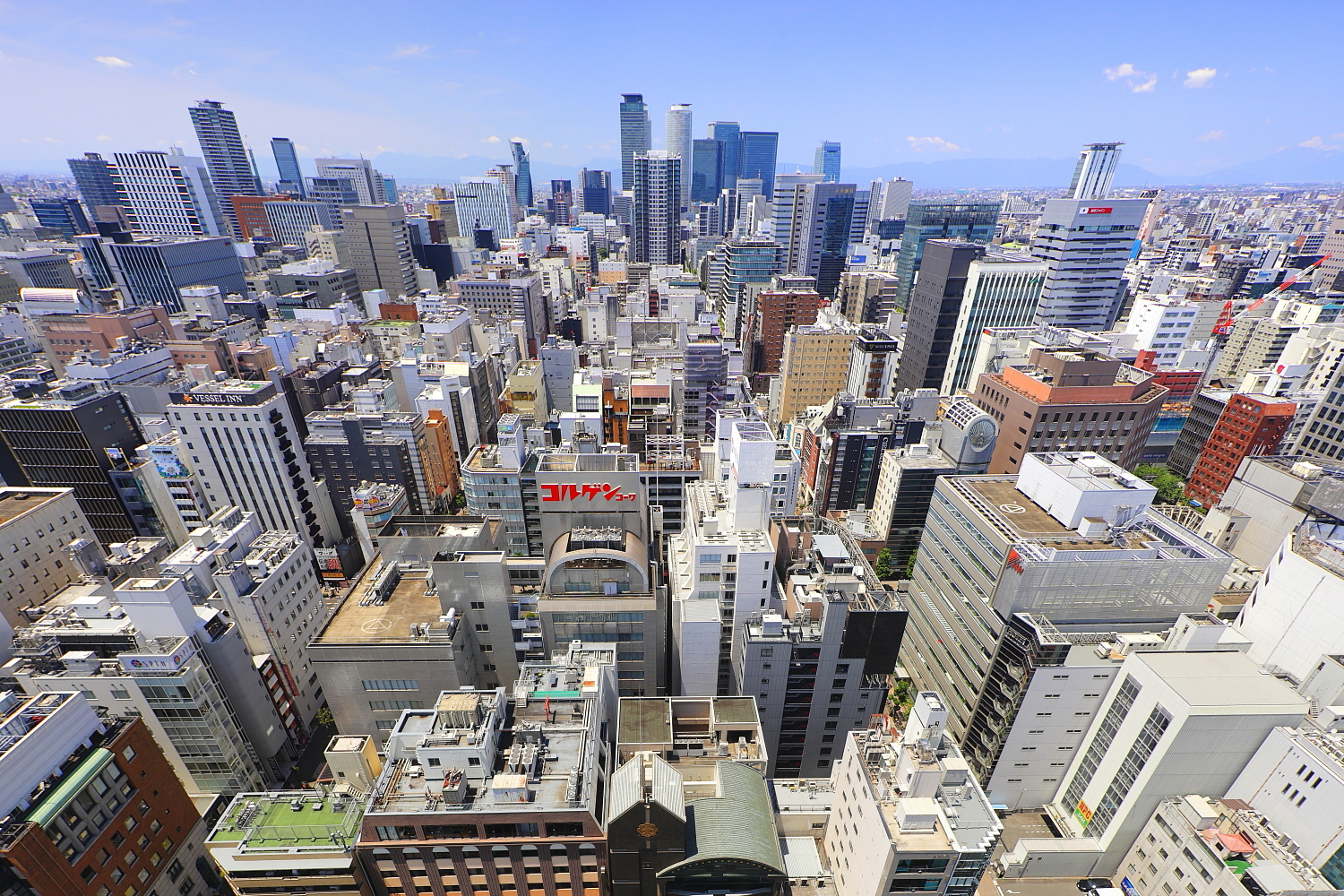
Nagoya skyline, Meieki district

Japan has more than 300 high-rise buildings above 150 m (490 ft). Unlike China, South Korea, Taiwan and Malaysia with skyscrapers exceeding 400 m (1,300 ft) in height, Japan's skyscrapers are a little shorter. All buildings above 50 m (160 ft) must also be as earthquake-proof as possible and adhere to other strict structural standards.

The tallest building in Japan is currently the 325.5 m (1,068 ft) tall Azabudai Hills Mori JP Tower, located in the Toranomon district of Tokyo. The 390 m (1,280 ft) Torch Tower is set to be completed in 2029 as the country's new tallest building.

== Completed ==
This list ranks Japanese skyscrapers that stand at least 190 m (620 ft) tall, based on standard height measurement. This height includes spires and architectural details but does not include antenna masts. An equal sign (=) following a rank indicates the same height between two or more buildings. The "Year" column indicates the year in which a building was completed. Existing partially habitable structures are included for comparison purposes; however, they are not ranked.

Was the tallest building in Japan upon completion

Rank	Name	Image	Height m (ft)	Floors	Year	Coordinates	City	Notes
—	Tokyo Skytree^{[A]}		634 (2,080)	32	2012	—	Tokyo	—
—	Tokyo Tower^{[A]}		333 (1,091)	7	1958	—	Tokyo	—
1	Azabudai Hills Mori JP Tower		325 (1,068)	64	2023	35°39′38″N 139°44′25″E	Tokyo	Tallest building in Japan; 2nd largest skyscraper by floor area in the world; Tallest building completed in Japan in the 2020s
2	Abeno Harukas		300 (984)	60	2014	34°38′45″N 135°30′48″E	Osaka	Tallest building in Osaka; Tallest building completed in Japan in the 2010s (tallest from 2014 to 2023)
3	Yokohama Landmark Tower		296 (972)	70	1993	35°27′17″N 139°37′54″E	Yokohama	Tallest building in Yokohama and Kanagawa Prefecture; Tallest building completed in Japan in the 1990s (tallest from 1993 to 2014); 2nd-tallest building in the Greater Tokyo Area
4	Tokyo Midtown Nihonbashi		284 (932)	52	2026	Chūō 35°40′58.66″N 139°46′32.49″E	Tokyo	4th-tallest building in Japan; 2nd-tallest building in Tokyo; Tallest building in Nihonbashi
5	Toranomon Hills Station Tower		266 (872)	49	2023	35°40′2.76″N 139°44′51.08″E	Tokyo	3rd-tallest building in Tokyo
6=	Osaka Prefectural Government Sakishima Building		256 (840)	55	1995	34°38′18″N 135°24′54″E	Osaka	Tallest building completed in Osaka in the 1990s; 2nd-tallest building in Osaka
6=	Rinku Gate Tower Building		256 (840)	56	1996	34°24′40″N 135°18′0″E	Izumisano	Tallest building in Izumisano and 2nd-tallest in Osaka Prefecture; Tallest building completed in Izumisano in the 1990s
8	Toranomon Hills Mori Tower		255 (838)	52	2014	35°40′00″N 139°44′58″E	Tokyo	Tallest building completed in Tokyo in the 2010s; 3rd-tallest building in Tokyo
9	Tofrom Yaesu Tower		250 (819)	51	2025	35°40′51.27″N 139°46′14.06″E	Chūō	Tallest building in Yaesu; 4th-tallest building in Tokyo
10	Midtown Tower	Ground-level view of a rectangular, glass high-rise; a smaller, circular building is in the foreground	248 (814)	54	2007	35°39′59″N 139°43′54″E	Tokyo	Tallest building completed in Japan in the 2000s; 5th-tallest building in Tokyo
11	Midland Square		247 (810)	47	2006	35°10′14″N 136°53′06″E	Nagoya	Tallest building in Nagoya and Aichi Prefecture; Tallest building completed in Nagoya in the 2000s
12	JR Central Office Tower		245 (804)	51	1999	35°10′15.6″N 136°52′57″E	Nagoya	Tallest building completed in Nagoya in the 1990s; 2nd-tallest building in Nagoya
13	Tokyo Metropolitan Government Building No. 1	Ground-level view of a grey, window-dotted high-rise; as the building rises, two towers break off on both sides	243 (799)	48	1991	35°41′22″N 139°41′29.5″E	Tokyo	Tallest city hall and largest projection mapping display in the world; Tallest building completed in Tokyo in the 1990s (tallest in Japan from 1990 to 1993); 5th-tallest building in Tokyo
14=	Sunshine 60	Ground-level view of a gray, rectangular high-rise lined with columns of windows	240 (787)	60	1978	35°43′46.5″N 139°43′4″E	Tokyo	Tallest building completed in Japan in the 1970s (tallest in the country from 1978 to 1991); Tallest building in Asia from 1978 to 1985; 6th-tallest building in Tokyo
14=	NTT Docomo Yoyogi Building	Ground-level view of a brown, rectangular high-rise; as it rises, it terraces to a point and a white and an orange antenna rises from the top. A clock is located on one side of the building.	240 (787)	27	2000	35°41′3.7″N 139°42′11.7″E	Tokyo	2nd-tallest structure with a clock face in the world; Pinnacle height (including antenna): 272 metres (892 feet); 2nd-tallest building in Tokyo and 4th-tallest in Japan by pinnacle height; 6th-tallest building in Tokyo by architectural height
14=	Tokyo Midtown Yaesu Yaesu Central Tower		240 (787)	45	2022	35°40′50″N 139°46′7″E	Tokyo	6th-tallest building in Tokyo
16	Roppongi Hills Mori Tower	Aerial view of a gray, oval-shaped high-rise lined with rows of windows; the facade is bisected by a smaller midsection	238 (781)	54	2003	35°39′38″N 139°43′45″E	Tokyo	9th-tallest building in Tokyo
17	Azabudai Hills Residence A		237 (778)	54	2023	35°39′43.77″N 139°44′25.24″E	Tokyo	10th-tallest building in Tokyo
18	Shinjuku Park Tower	Aerial view of a beige high-rise lined with rows of windows; the building is composed of three adjoined towers of differing heights	235 (771)	52	1994	35°41′8″N 139°41′27.4″E	Tokyo	
—	Fukuoka Tower^{[A]}		234 (768)	5	1989	—	Fukuoka	—
19	Tokyo Opera City Tower	Mid-level view of a white, window-dotted, rectangular high-rise; the corners are cut and made of glass	234 (769)	54	1996	35°40′58″N 139°41′12.6″E	Tokyo	
20	Sumitomo Fudosan Roppongi Grand Tower		231 (758)	40	2016	35°39′52.56″N 139°44′15.58″E	Tokyo	
21	Shibuya Scramble Square		230 (754)	47	2019	35°39′30″N 139°42′8″E	Tokyo	
22	Blue Front Shibaura Tower S		229 (751)	43	2025	35°39′3.38″N 139°45′26.40″E	Minato	Tallest building in Shibaura; The 166-metre (545-foot) Hamamatsucho Building (Toshiba Building) is adjacent to the north and will be replaced by the 227-metre (745-foot) Blue Front Shibaura Tower N
22	JR Central Hotel Tower		226 (741)	53	1999	35°10′12.3″N 136°52′58.8″E	Nagoya	3rd-tallest building in Nagoya
23	Tokyu Kabukicho Tower		225 (738)	48	2023	35°41′45″N 139°42′2″E	Tokyo	
24	Shinjuku Mitsui Building	Ground-level view of a black, rectangular high-rise. its glass facades are highly reflective and the smaller facade is bisected by black, inset, crisscrossed beams	224 (734)	55	1974	35°41′30.8″N 139°41′38″E	Tokyo	Tallest building in Japan and Asia from 1974 to 1978
25	Shinjuku Center Building		223 (732)	54	1979	35°41′30.5″N 139°41′43″E	Tokyo	
26	Toranomon Hills Residential Tower		222 (728)	54	2022	35°39′58″N 139°44′55″E	Tokyo	
27	Saint Luke's Tower	Ground-level view of two blueish-grey buildings connected by an enclosed corridor near the top of the buildings	221 (724)	47	1994	35°40′.4″N 139°46′44″E	Tokyo	A 146-meter-tall (479-foot) residential tower is connected to it via a skybridge
28	Shiodome City Center		216 (708)	42	2003	35°39′55″N 139°45′40.5″E	Tokyo	
29	Sumitomo Fudosan Tokyo Mita Garden Tower		215 (705)	42	2023		Tokyo	
—	G1 Tower^{[A]}		213 (700)	9	2010	—	Hitachinaka	—
30=	Dentsu Building	Ground-level view of a thin high-rises's curved, glass facade	213 (700)	48	2002	35°39′52.7″N 139°45′46″E	Tokyo	
30=	Act Tower		213 (698)	45	1994	34°42′20.5″N 137°44′14″E	Hamamatsu	Tallest building in Hamamatsu and Shizuoka Prefecture; Tallest building completed in Hamamatsu in the 1990s
32=	Tokiwabashi Tower		212 (696)	38	2021	35°41′4.1″N 139°46′13.4″E	Tokyo	Part of the Tokyo Torch redevelopment
32=	The Tower Yokohama Kitanaka		212 (695)	58	2020	35°27′5″N 139°38′9″E	Yokohama	Tallest building completed in Yokohama in the 2020s; 2nd-tallest building in Yokohama and Kanagawa Prefecture
34	The Landmark Nagoya Sakae		211.7 (695)	41	2026	35.16971°N 136.90745°E	Nagoya	
34	JR Gate Tower		211 (693)	46	2016	35°10′19.5″N 136°52′58″E	Nagoya	Tallest building completed in Nagoya in the 2010s; 4th-tallest building in Nagoya
35	Shinjuku Sumitomo Building		210 (690)	52	1974	35°41′28.7″N 139°41′33″E	Tokyo	Tallest building in Japan and Asia from March to September 1974
—	Toshima Incineration Plant^{[A]}		210 (689)	11	1999	—	Tokyo	—
36=	The Kitahama		209 (687)	54	2009	34°41′21″N 135°30′25.5″E	Osaka	Tallest all-residential building in Japan; Tallest building completed in Osaka in the 2000s; 3rd-tallest building in Osaka
36=	Shinjuku Nomura Building	Ground-level view of a white, rectangular, window-dotted high-rise; one side is vertically bisected	209 (686)	50	1978	35°41′35″N 139°41′43″E	Tokyo	
36=	The Park House Nishishinjuku Tower 60		209 (686)	60	2017	35°41′37.75″N 139°41′12″E	Tokyo	
36=	Tokyo World Gate Akasaka Trust Tower		209 (686)	43	2024	35°40′10.97″N 139°44′25.57″E	Tokyo	
36=	Tokyo PortCity Takeshiba Office Tower		209 (685)	39	2020	35°39′17.5″N 139°45′40.5″E	Tokyo	
41	Ark Hills Sengokuyama Mori Tower		207 (678)	47	2012	35°39′48″N 139°44′33″E	Tokyo	
42=	GranTokyo North Tower	Ground-level view of a glass, rectangular high-rise	205 (673)	43	2007	35°40′40.3″N 139°46′0″E	Tokyo	
42=	GranTokyo South Tower	Mid-level view of a rectangular, glass high-rise; one side is vertically bisected by a section	205 (673)	42	2007	35°40′43″N 139°46′2″E	Tokyo	
42=	Akasaka Intercity AIR		205 (673)	38	2017	35°40′11.5″N 139°44′31″E	Tokyo	
45=	Mode Gakuen Cocoon Tower	Ground-level view of a blue, glass high-rise. Two opposite sides of the building curve inward until meeting at the top; these sides also have many white stripes haphazardly strewn across them.	204 (668)	50	2008	35°41′30″N 139°41′49″E	Tokyo	2nd-tallest educational building in the world
45=	Park City Musashi-Kosugi Mid Sky Tower		204 (668)	59	2009	35°34′29.5″N 139°39′38″E	Kawasaki	Tallest building in Kawasaki and 3rd-tallest in Kanagawa Prefecture; Tallest building completed in Kawasaki in the 2000s
47	Izumi Garden Tower	Aerial view of a green, glass high-rise composed of square sections that rise to differing heights	201 (659)	45	2002	35°39′52″N 139°44′23″E	Tokyo	
48=	Sompo Japan Building	Ground-level view of a thin, brown and white high-rise; the two wider sides curve and flair out as they near the bottom	200 (656)	43	1976	35°41′33.8″N 139°41′46″E	Tokyo	
48=	X-Tower Osaka Bay		200 (656)	54	2006	34°40′6.5″N 135°27′37″E	Osaka	4th-tallest building in Osaka
48=	Osaka Bay Tower		200 (656)	51	1993	34°40′9″N 135°27′40″E	Osaka	4th-tallest building in Osaka
48=	JP Tower	Ground-level view of a blue, glass high-rise; the tower sits behind a small, white, stone, window-dotted facade	200 (656)	38	2012	35°40′46.5″N 139°45′53″E	Tokyo	
48=	Yomiuri Shimbun Building		200 (656)	33	2013	35°41′7.5″N 139°45′56″E	Tokyo	
48=	Otemachi Tower		200 (656)	38	2013	35°41′7.5″N 139°45′56″E	Tokyo	
48=	Otemachi One Tower		200 (656)	40	2020	35°41′16.5″N 139°45′47.5″E	Tokyo	
48=	Nakanoshima Festival Tower West		200 (656)	41	2017	34°41′36.7″N 135°29′43.5″E	Osaka	6th-tallest building in Osaka
48=	Nakanoshima Festival Tower		200 (656)	39	2012	34°41′36.7″N 135°29′48.3″E	Osaka	6th-tallest building in Osaka
57=	Shin-Marunouchi Building	Ground-level view of a glass, boxy high-rise; it is composed of two sections, the larger of which rises higher than the other	198 (650)	38	2007	35°40′57″N 139°45′51.7″E	Tokyo	
57=	City Tower Hiroshima		198 (648)	52	2016	34°23′44.40″N 132°28′30.02″E	Hiroshima	Tallest building in Hiroshima; Tallest building completed in Hiroshima in the 2010s
58	World Trade Center South Tower		197 (647)	39	2021	35°39′17.1″N 139°45′22.8″E	Tokyo	
60=	JP Tower Nagoya		196 (642)	40	2015	35°10′21″N 136°52′56″E	Nagoya	5th-tallest building in Nagoya
60=	Kansai Electric Power Building		196 (641)	41	2004	34°41′34″N 135°29′33.5″E	Osaka	8th-tallest building in Osaka
62=	Sumitomo Fudosan Shinjuku Grand Tower	Ground-level view of a blue and black, rectangular, glass high-rise; one facade is covered in slightly protruding vertical stripes.	195 (641)	40	2011	35°41′46″N 139°41′26″E	Tokyo	
62=	Brillia Tower Dojima (One Dojima)		195 (640)	49	2024	34°41′45.20″N 135°29′36.99″E	Osaka	Tallest building completed in Osaka in the 2020s; 9th-tallest building in Osaka
62=	Harumi Island Triton Square Tower X	Ground-level view of a three-building complex; each building is white and blue and lined with rows of windows	195 (639)	44	2001	35°39′22.4″N 139°46′57″E	Tokyo	
62=	Nihonbashi Mitsui Tower	Ground-level view of a rectangular, glass high-rise; adjoining the high-rise is a stone building featuring columns	195 (639)	39	2005	35°41′13″N 139°46′22.8″E	Tokyo	
62=	Park Tower Kachidoki South		195 (639)	58	2023	35°39′23.09″N 139°46′34.35″E	Tokyo	
66	Sanno Park Tower	Ground-level view of a boxy, gray high-rise	194 (638)	44	2000	35°40′23″N 139°44′25″E	Tokyo	
68=	Nittele Tower	Ground-level view of a blue, glass, rectangular high-rise; attached to one side of the building are two structures consisting of poles that run the height of the building	193 (633)	32	2003	35°39′52.7″N 139°45′35.6″E	Tokyo	
68=	The Parkhouse Nakanoshima Tower		193 (633)	54	2017	34°41′19″N 135°29′7.2″E	Osaka	10th-tallest building in Osaka
68=	Umeda Garden Residence		193 (633)	56	2022	34°42′5.9″N 135°30′4.4″E	Osaka	10th-tallest building in Osaka
71=	Kachidoki View Tower	Ground-level view of a white, rectangular high-rise; the corners are cut and balconies form horizontal stripes up the height of the tower	192 (631)	55	2010	35°39′33.8″N 139°46′35.8″E	Tokyo	
71=	Mid Tower	Ground-level view of two similar rectangular high-rises; each building is painted to have curved sections of color on the primarily white facades	192 (630)	58	2008	35°39′21″N 139°46′25″E	Tokyo	
71=	Sea Tower	Ground-level view of two similar rectangular high-rises; each building is painted to have curved sections of color on the primarily white facades	192 (630)	58	2008	35°39′17.6″N 139°46′29.3″E	Tokyo	
74=	Tokyo Midtown Hibiya		191 (628)	35	2018	35°40′25″N 139°45′32.8″E	Tokyo	
74=	Tomihisa Cross Comfort Tower	Tomihisa Cross Comfort Tower	191 (627)	55	2015	35°41′31″N 139°42′50.3″E	Tokyo	
76=	Acty Shiodome	Aerial view of a brown and beige, rectangular, window-dotted high-rise	190 (624)	56	2004	35°39′29.5″N 139°45′31″E	Tokyo	
76=	City Tower Kobe Sannomiya		190 (623)	54	2013	34°41′47.7″N 135°11′53.4″E	Kobe	Tallest building in Kobe and Hyogo Prefecture; Tallest building completed in Kobe in the 2010s
76=	City Tower Musashikosugi		190 (623)	54	2016	35°34′21.83″N 139°39′36.20″E	Kawasaki	Tallest building completed in Kawasaki in the 2010s; 2nd-tallest building in Kawasaki and 4th-tallest in Kanagawa Prefecture
76=	Osaka Umeda Twin Towers South		190 (623)	38	2022	34°42′3.4″N 135°29′50.5″E	Osaka	
76=	Herbis Osaka		190 (622)	40	1997	34°41′55″N 135°29′34.5″E	Osaka	
76=	The Sanctus Tower		190 (622)	53	2015	34°40′43″N 135°29′40.5″E	Osaka	

= Indicates buildings that have the same rank because they have the same height.
A. This structure is not a fully habitable building, but is included in this list for comparative purposes. Per a ruling by the Council on Tall Buildings and Urban Habitat, freestanding observation towers or chimneys are not considered to be buildings, as they are not fully habitable structures.

== Under construction ==
This table lists buildings that are under construction in Japan and are planned to rise at least 190 m (620 ft). Any buildings that have been topped out but are not completed are also included.

Indicates buildings that have been topped out.

Name	Image	Height m (ft)	Floors	Start	Finish	City	Notes
Torch Tower		390 (1,280)	63	2023	2028	Tokyo	
Nihonbashi 1-Chōme Central District Redevelopment		284 (932)	52	2022	2026	Tokyo	
Azabudai Hills Residence B	263 (862)	64	2019	2025	Tokyo		
Shinjuku Station West Gate Redevelopment		258 (847)	48	2024	2030	Tokyo	
Tokyo Ekimae Yaesu 1-Chōme East District Redevelopment	250 (819)	51	2021	2025	Tokyo		
World Trade Center North		234 (766)	46	2022	2027	Tokyo	
Blue Front Shibaura S Tower	229 (751)	43	2021	2025	Tokyo		
Yaesu 2-Chōme Central District Redevelopment		223 (733)	43	2024	2029	Tokyo	
Yaesu 1-Chōme North District Redevelopment		218 (715)	44	2024	2029	Tokyo	
Nishiki 3-Chōme Block 25		212 (695)	41	2022	2026	Nagoya	
Akasaka 2-6-Chōme District Redevelopment		207 (680)	40	2024	2028	Tokyo	
Grand City Tower Tsukishima		199 (654)	58	2022	2026	Tokyo	
Honchō 1-Chōme Project		193 (633)	51	2024	2028	Funabashi	
Grand City Tower Ikebukuro		190 (623)	52	2022	2027	Tokyo	

== Proposed ==
This table lists buildings proposed for construction in Japan that are planned to reach a height of at least 190 m (620 ft). Visionary projects are excluded from this list, but Tokyo's tallest 'vision' projects can be found in the list of tallest structures envisioned for Tokyo.

Name	Height m (ft)	Floors	Year	City	Notes
Roppongi 5-Chome West District A Building	327 (1,072)	66	2030	Tokyo	
Roppongi 5-Chome West District B Building	288 (945)	70	2030	Tokyo	
Yumeshima Station Tower	275 (820)	55	TBA	Osaka	
Ikebukuro Station West Exit Redevelopment Building B	270 (886)	50	2040	Tokyo	
Nakano Station New North Entrance	262 (860)	61	2029	Tokyo	To be built on the site of the 92-meter-tall (302-foot) Nakano Sunplaza
Shinjuku Station East Gate Redevelopment	260 (853)	TBA	TBA	Tokyo	To be built on the site of the Lumine Est
Sapporo Station South Entrance Redevelopment	245 (804)	43	2030	Sapporo	
Tokyo Cross Park Central Tower	235 (769)	48	2029	Tokyo	To be built on the site of the demolished 109-meter-tall (358-foot) Hibiya U-1 Building (Yamato Seimei Building)
Tokyo Cross Park South Tower	233 (763)	45	2027	Tokyo	To be built on the site of the demolished 143-meter-tall (469-foot) Mizuho Bank Uchisaiwaichō Head Office
Tokyo Cross Park North Tower	230 (755)	46	2030	Tokyo	To be built on the site of the 129-meter-tall (423-foot) Imperial Hotel Tokyo Tower; A 145-meter-tall (476-foot) Main Building will be built next to it, replacing the current 61-meter-tall (200-foot) Imperial Hotel Tokyo Main Building (scheduled for completion in 2036)
Yaesu 2-Chōme South District Redevelopment	230 (755)	39	2028	Tokyo	
Nishi-Shinjuku 3-Chōme West Redevelopment North Tower	229 (751)	63	2032	Tokyo	
Nishi-Shinjuku 3-Chōme West Redevelopment South Tower	228 (748)	62	2032	Tokyo	
Blue Front Shibaura N Tower	227 (746)	45	2031	Tokyo	To be built on the site of the 166-meter-tall (545-foot) Hamamatsucho Building (Toshiba Building)
Roppongi 1-Chōme North District Project	225 (738)	54	2030	Tokyo	
Shinjuku Station Southwest Entrance District South Building	225 (738)	36	2029	Tokyo	It will be located both in Nishi-Shinjuku and Yoyogi; A 110-meter-tall (360-foot) building will be located just north of it (set for completion in the 2040s)
Ikebukuro Station West Exit Redevelopment Building A	220 (722)	41	2043	Tokyo	
Nihonbashi 1-Chōme East District Block B	213 (699)	51	2032	Tokyo	
Shibuya 2-Chōme West District Redevelopment Tower B	208 (682)	41	2029	Tokyo	
Nakanoshima 5-Chōme Redevelopment West Building	205 (673)	57	2031	Osaka	Residential; Construction is expected to last from Spring 2026 until Spring 2031
Nihonbashi 1-Chōme East District Block A	205 (673)	40	2032	Tokyo	
Nishi-Azabu 3-Chōme Redevelopment	201 (660)	54	2028	Tokyo	
Tsudanuma Station South Exit Area Redevelopment	199 (651)	52	2031	Narashino	Construction is expected to last from 2028 until 2031
Nakanoshima 5-Chōme Redevelopment East Building	197 (645)	52	2030	Osaka	Residential; Construction is expected to last from November 2025 until May 2030
Minami-Ikebukuro 2-Chōme District B Redevelopment	195 (640)	57	TBA	Tokyo	
Higashi-Takashima District C-2 B Tower	195 (640)	52	2029	Yokohama	
Umeda 1-Chōme Central District Redevelopment	192 (630)	TBA	2030	Osaka	To be built on the site of the 124-meter-tall (407-foot) Osaka Maru Building after Expo 2025
Kita-Aoyama 2-Chōme Jingu Gaien Office Building	190 (623)	38	2028	Tokyo	

== Timeline of tallest buildings ==
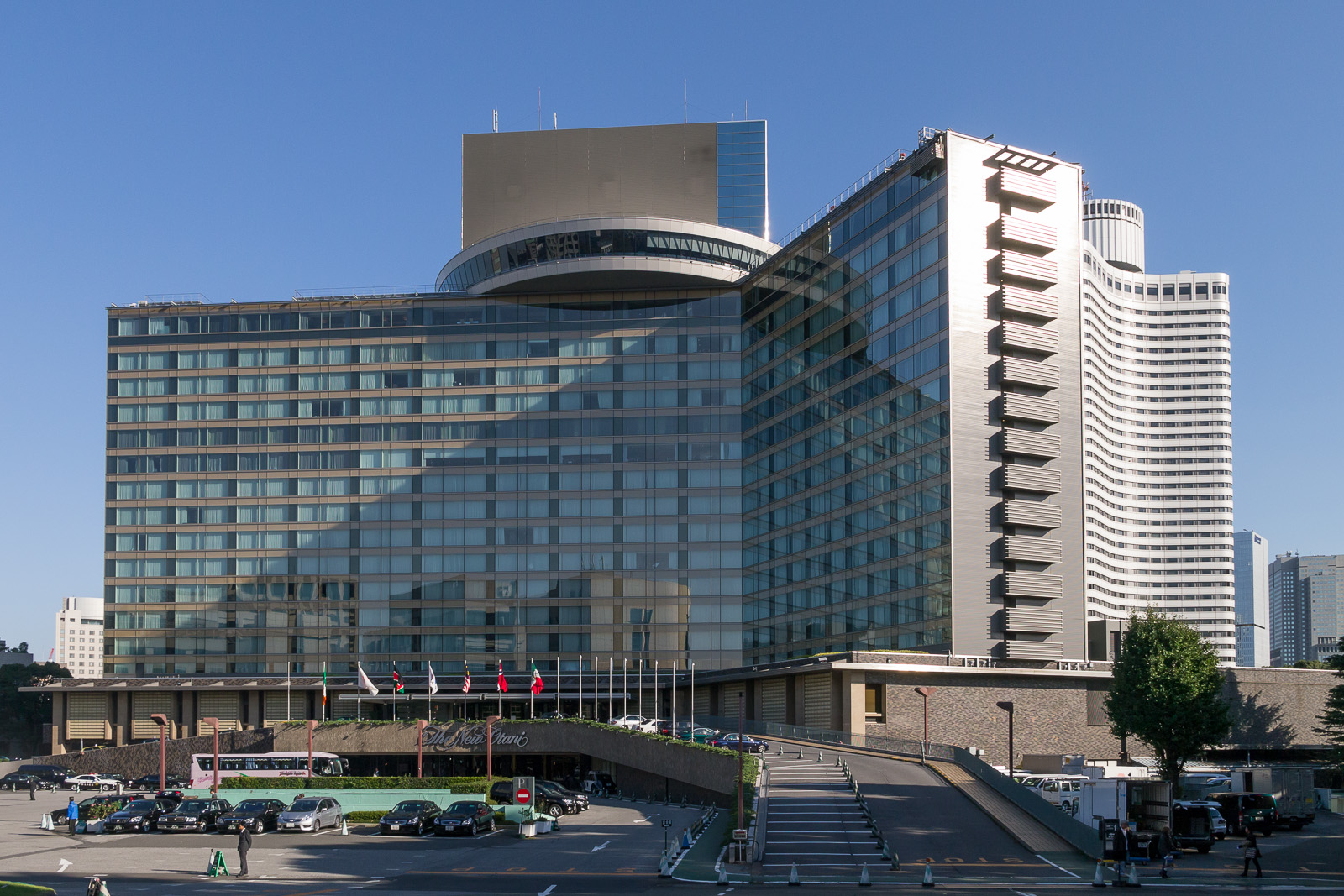
Built in 1964 to correspond with the 1964 Summer Olympics, the Hotel New Otani Tokyo was Japan's tallest building until 1968

This is a list of buildings that once held the title of tallest building in Japan. From its completion in 1958 and until the opening of the Tokyo Skytree in 2011, Tokyo Tower retained the title of tallest structure in Japan, aside from various guyed masts that were built in the 1960s and 1970s, later dismantled in the 1990s.

Name	Years as tallest	Height m (ft)	Floors	City	Notes
Ryōunkaku	1890–1923	69 (225)	12	Tokyo	
Five-storied Pagoda at Tō-ji	1923–1936	55 (180)	5	Kyoto	
National Diet Building	1936–1964	65 (215)	9	Tokyo	
Hotel New Otani Tokyo	1964–1968	72 (237)	17	Tokyo	
Kasumigaseki Building	1968–1970	156 (512)	36	Tokyo	
World Trade Center Building	1970–1971	163 (533)	40	Tokyo	
Keio Plaza Hotel North Tower	1971–1974	180 (589)	47	Tokyo	
Shinjuku Sumitomo Building	1974	210 (690)	52	Tokyo	
Shinjuku Mitsui Building	1974–1978	225 (738)	55	Tokyo	
Sunshine 60	1978–1990	240 (786)	60	Tokyo	
Tokyo Metropolitan Government Building	1990–1993	243 (797)	48	Tokyo	
Yokohama Landmark Tower	1993–2014	296 (970)	70	Yokohama	
Abeno Harukas	2014–2023	300 (984)	60	Osaka	
Azabudai Hills Mori JP Tower	2023–present	325.5 (1,068)	64	Tokyo	

== Tallest demolished buildings ==
Buildings are demolished or desconstruction in Japan above "100m"

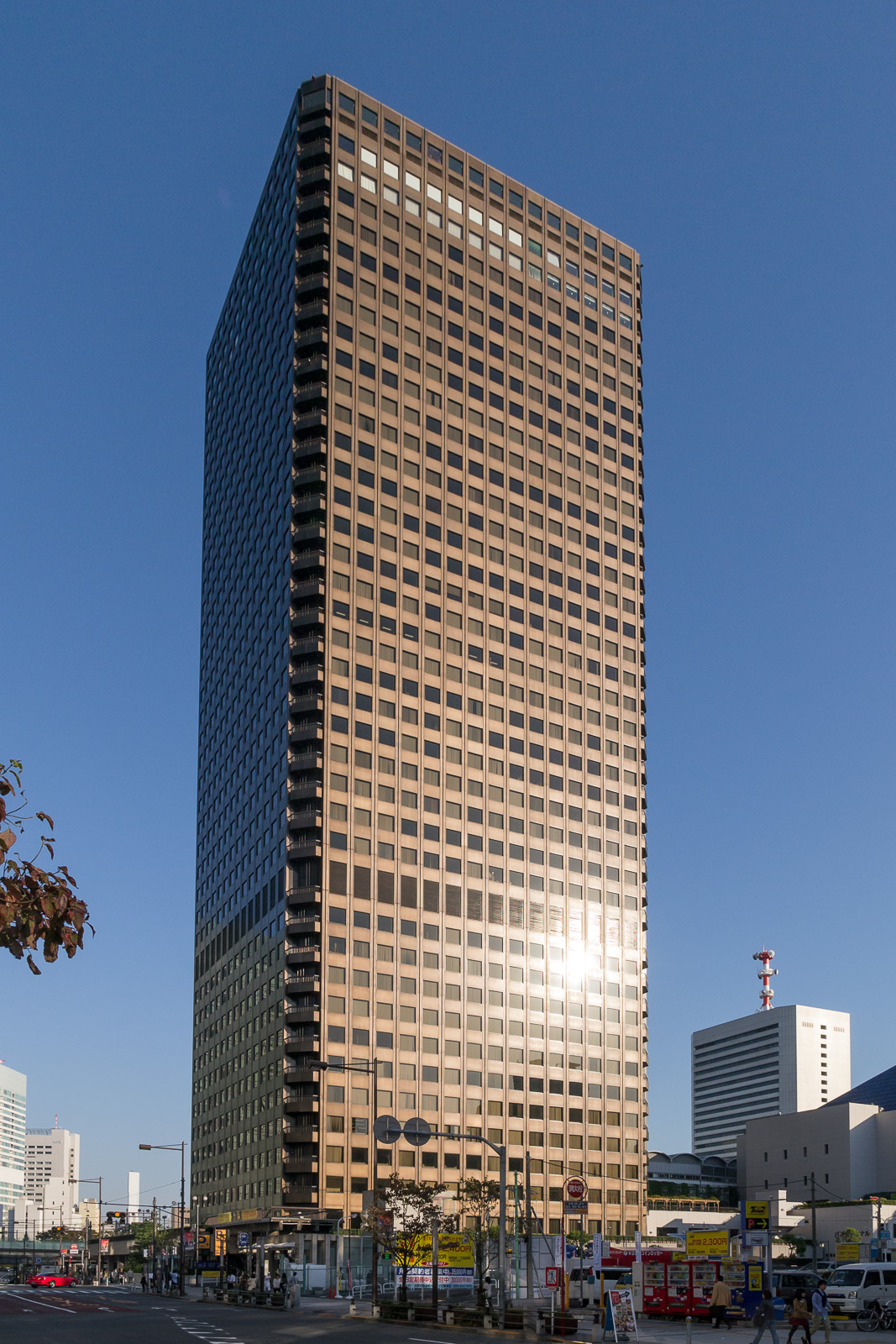
World Trade Center Building (1st Generation)

Name	Height m	Built	Demolition	Notes
World Trade Center Building	162.6m	1970	2021	
Mizuho Bank Uchisaiwaichō Head Office Building	142.5m	1981	2023	
Grand Prince Hotel Akasaka	138.9m	1982	2013	Shrunk down for demolition and redeveloped into Tokyo Garden Terrace Kioicho
Hotel Sofitel Tokyo	112m	1994	2008	

This is not complete

== Tallest structures ==
This list ranks Japanese structures that stand at least 210 metres (690 ft) tall, based on standard height measurement. This height includes spires, architectural details and antenna masts.

Rank	Name	Image	Height m (ft)	Year	Coordinates	Structure type	Prefecture	Notes
1	Tokyo Skytree		634 (2,080)	2011	35°42′36.5″N 139°48′39″E	Lattice tower	Tokyo	Tallest tower in the world
2	Tokyo Tower	The orange and white lattice frame of Tokyo Tower rises up in front of a clear, blue sky.	333 (1,091)	1958	35°39′31″N 139°44′44″E	Lattice tower	Tokyo	23rd-tallest tower in the world
3 tie	Akashi Kaikyō Bridge, North Tower		298 (979)	1998	34°37′26″N 135°1′38″E	Bridge pylon	Hyogo	
3 tie	Akashi Kaikyō Bridge, South Tower		298 (979)	1998	34°36′34″N 135°0′53″E	Bridge pylon	Hyogo	
5 tie	Ebino VLF transmitter, mast 1		270 (886)	1991	32°4′36″N 130°49′33″E	Guyed mast	Miyazaki	
5 tie	Ebino VLF transmitter, mast 2		270 (886)	1991	32°4′54″N 130°49′30″E	Guyed mast	Miyazaki	
5 tie	Ebino VLF transmitter, mast 3		270 (886)	1991	32°5′11″N 130°49′27″E	Guyed mast	Miyazaki	
5 tie	Ebino VLF transmitter, mast 4		270 (886)	1991	32°5′29″N 130°49′23″E	Guyed mast	Miyazaki	
5 tie	Ebino VLF transmitter, mast 5		270 (886)	1991	32°5′32″N 130°49′44″E	Guyed mast	Miyazaki	
5 tie	Ebino VLF transmitter, mast 6		270 (886)	1991	32°5′14″N 130°49′47″E	Guyed mast	Miyazaki	
5 tie	Ebino VLF transmitter, mast 7		270 (886)	1991	32°4′56″N 130°49′50″E	Guyed mast	Miyazaki	
5 tie	Ebino VLF transmitter, mast 8		270 (886)	1991	32°4′39″N 130°49′54″E	Guyed mast	Miyazaki	
13	Yokohama Media Tower		253 (830)	1999	35°27′36″N 139°37′48″E	Building with a lattice tower	Yokohama	
14	Otakadoya-yama Transmitter Antenna		250 (820)	1999	37°22′21.5″N 140°50′55.8″E	Guyed mast	Fukushima	
15	Seto Digital Tower		245 (803)	2011	35.1955°N 137.0743°E	Lattice tower	Seto, Aichi	
16	NHK Shobu-Kuki Transmitter Main Mast		240 (787)	1982	36°04′21″N 139°37′25.2″E	Guyed mast	Saitama	Replaced the dismantled NHK Kawaguchi Transmitter
17	Fukuoka Tower		234 (768)	1989	33°35′35.7″N 130°21′5.3″E	Observation tower	Fukuoka	Tallest structure in Fukuoka Prefecture; Tallest structure completed in Japan in the 1980s
18	Kashima Power Station Chimney #1		231 (758)	1971	35°52′47″N 140°41′22″E	Lattice chimney	Kashima	
19 tie	Mitsubishi Chemical Kashima Plant		230 (755)	2001	35°54′11″N 140°41′23″E	Steel chimney	Kashima	
19 tie	Hitachinaka Power Plant		230 (755)	2003	36°26′23″N 140°36′52″E	Hyperboloid chimney	Hitachinaka	
21 tie	Chūshi Powerline Crossing, north tower		226 (741)	1962	34°19′55.8″N 132°59′3.3″E	Electricity pylon	Hiroshima	
21 tie	Chūshi Powerline Crossing, south tower		226 (741)	1962	34°18′42.8″N 132°59′32.2″E	Electricity pylon	Hiroshima	
21 tie	Tatara Bridge, west tower		226 (741)	1999	34°15′32″N 133°3′35″E ;	Bridge pylon	Ehime	
21 tie	Tatara Bridge, east tower		226 (741)	1999	34°15′38″N 133°4′10″E	Bridge pylon	Ehime	
25 tie	Osaki Channel Powerline Crossing, north tower		223 (732)	1997	34°18′19.8″N 132°52′28.2″E	Electricity pylon	Hiroshima	Located 10 km east of the Chūshi Powerline Crossing
25 tie	Osaki Channel Powerline Crossing, south tower		223 (732)	1997	34°17′15.4″N 132°53′1.1″E	Electricity pylon	Hiroshima	
27 tie	Chita Thermal Power Station Units 1–4		220 (722)		34°59′11.7″N 136°50′33.2″E	Steel chimney	Aichi	
27 tie	Ministry of Defense Building B		220 (722)	1996		Building with a lattice tower	Tokyo	
27 tie	Nippon Steel Kimitsu plant		220 (722)	2001	35°21′53″N 139°51′16″E	Steel chimney	Kimitsu	
30	NTT DoCoMo Saitama Building		218.5 (717)	2001		Building with a steel tower	Saitama	
31	G1 Tower		213 (699)	2010	36°24′08.08″N 140°30′49.99″E	Elevator test tower	Ibaraki	
32	Toshima Incineration Plant		210 (689)	1999	35°44′3.6″N 139°42′50″E	Concrete chimney	Tokyo	Tallest incinerator chimney in the world

=== Demolished or destroyed structures ===
Name	Height m (ft)	Year built	Year destroyed	Structure type	Location	Coordinates	Notes
Iwo Jima LORAN-C transmission mast	412 (1,350)	1963	1965	Guyed mast	Iwo Jima	24°48′08″N 141°19′32″E	Collapsed and replaced
1st Marcus Island LORAN-C transmission mast	412 (1,350)	1964	1985	Guyed mast	Marcus Island	24°17′08.79″N 153°58′52.2″E	Dismantled and replaced by a smaller one
2nd Iwo Jima LORAN-C transmission mast	412 (1,350)	1965	1993	Guyed mast	Iwo Jima	24°48′08″N 141°19′32″E	Dismantled
Shushi Wan OMEGA transmitter	389 (1,276)	1973	1998	Guyed mast	Tsushima Island	34°36′53.06″N 129°27′13.12″E	Dismantled
NHK Kawaguchi Transmitter	313 (1,026)	1937	1984	Guyed mast	Kawaguchi, Saitama	35°49′37″N 139°43′14″E ; 35°49′52″N 139°43′12″E	T-antenna (2 masts); dismantled
Yosami Transmitting Station	250 (820)	1929	1997	Guyed mast	Kariya, Aichi	34°58′20″N 137°00′59″E	8 masts; dismantled
2nd Marcus Island LORAN-C transmission mast	213 (700)	1986	2000	Guyed mast	Marcus Island	24°17′08.79″N 153°58′52.2″E	Dismantled and replaced
3rd Marcus Island LORAN-C transmission mast	213 (699)	2000	2010	Guyed mast	Marcus Island	24°17′8.7″N 153°58′52″E	Dismantled

== See also ==
- List of tallest buildings in Tokyo
- List of tallest buildings in Osaka
- List of tallest buildings in Nagoya
- List of tallest buildings in Fukuoka
- List of tallest buildings in Sapporo
- List of tallest buildings in Hiroshima
- List of tallest buildings by Japanese prefecture
