= List of tallest buildings in Yokohama =

Skyline of Yokohama
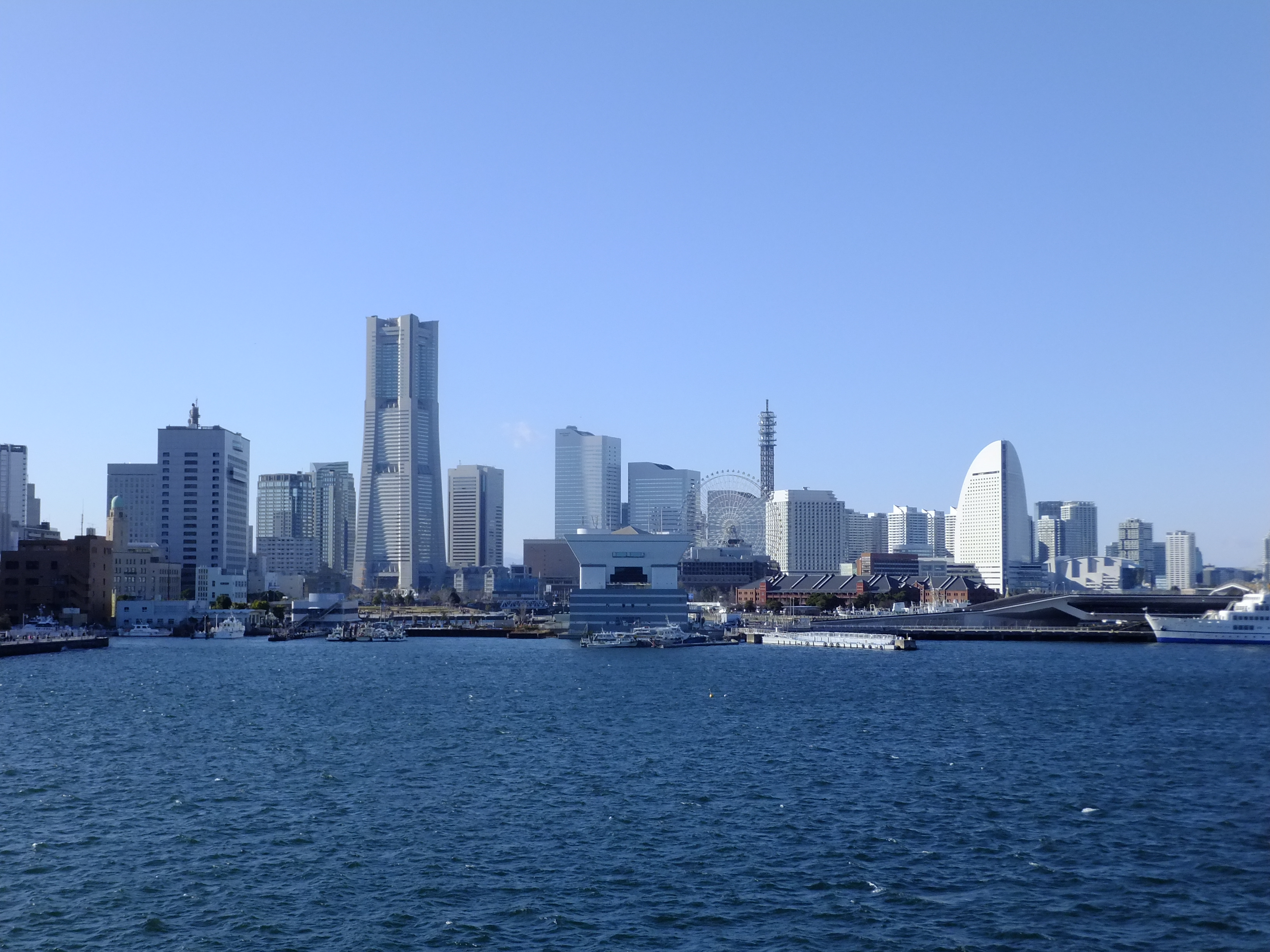
- Skyline of Yokohama in 2015
- Tallest building: Yokohama Landmark Tower (1993)
- Tallest building height: 296 m (971 ft)
- First 150 m+ building: Yokohama Landmark Tower

Number of tall buildings (2025)
- Taller than 100 m (328 ft): 44
- Taller than 150 m (492 ft): 11
- Taller than 200 m (656 ft): 2

Yokohama is the second largest city in Japan by population, with over 3.7 million inhabitants, and the capital and largest city of Kanagawa Prefecture. Yokohama is a major economic, cultural, and commercial hub of the Greater Tokyo Area.

As of 2025, Yokohama has 11 completed buildings over 150 meters (492 feet), and 44 completed buildings over 100 meters (328 feet). There are 4 more buildings over 150 meters under construction.

The tallest building in Yokohama is the Yokohama Landmark Tower, built in 1993. At 296 meters (972 feet), it nearly reaches the height required to be classified as a supertall skyscraper, at 300 meters (984 feet). At the time of its completion, it was the tallest building in Japan. As of 2025, it is the third tallest building in the country.

== Tallest buildings ==
This list ranks completed buildings in Yokohama that stand at least 100 m (328 ft) tall as of 2026, based on standard height measurement. This includes spires and architectural details but does not include antenna masts. The “Year” column indicates the year of completion. Buildings tied in height are sorted by year of completion with earlier buildings ranked first, and then alphabetically.

Rank	Name	Image	Height m (ft)	Floors	Year	Notes
1	Yokohama Landmark Tower 横浜ランドマークタワー		296	70	1993	
2	Yokohama Kitanaka Knot 横浜北仲ノット		212	58	2020	
3	The Yokohama Front Tower ザ・ヨコハマフロントタワー		178	43	2024	
4	Queen's Tower A クイーンズスクエア横浜クイーンズタワーA		171.8	36	1997	
5	Yokohama Symphostage 横浜シンフォステージ		158	30	2024	
6	Bay Quarter 横浜ダイヤビルディング		156.5	31	2009	
7	Yokohama City Hall 横浜市新庁舎		154.7	32	2020	
8	Bank of Yokohama 横浜銀行本店ビル		152.5	28	1993	
9	Yokohama Mitsui Building 横浜三井ビルディング		152.2	30	2012	
10	Mitsubishi Jyuko Yokohama Building 三菱重工横浜ビル		151.9	33	1993	
11	Nabule Yokohama Tower and Residence ナビューレ横浜タワーレジデンス		150.0	41	2007	
12	Shin Yokohama Prince Hotel 新横浜プリンスホテル		149.35	42	1992	
13	Yokohama Connect Square 横浜コネクトスクエア		145.82	28	2023	
14	Park Tower Yokohama Station Premier パークタワー横浜ステーションプレミア		140.3	36	2007	
15	The Yokohama Towers (West) ザ・ヨコハマタワーズ タワーウエスト		140.0	42	2001	
16	The Yokohama Towers (East) ザ・ヨコハマタワーズ タワーイースト		140.0	42	2003	
17	InterContinental Yokohama Grand ヨコハマグランドインターコンチネンタルホテル		140.0	31	1991	
18	Queen's Tower B クイーンズスクエア横浜クイーンズタワーB		137.8	28	1997	
19	APA Hotel & Resort Yokohama Bay Tower アパホテル&リゾート〈横浜ベイタワー〉		135.04	35	2019	
20	New Japan Oil Building 日石横浜ビル		133.0	30	1997	
21	JR Yokohama Tower; JR横浜タワー		132.3	30	2020	
22	Yokohama Sky Building 横浜スカイビル		132.0	30	1996	
23	Mioka Tower The Residence 上大岡タワー ザ レジデンス		128.0	34	2010	
24	Marina Gate Tower コットンハーバータワーズマリナゲートタワー		126.65	38	2008	
25	MinatoMirai Grand Central Tower みなとみらいグランドセントラルタワー		123.6	26	2011	
26	Yokohama Island Tower 横浜アイランドタワー		120.0	27	2003	
27	Orto Yokohama View Tower オルトヨコハマ ビュータワー		120.0	40	2000	
28	Cotton Harbor Towers Bay West コットンハーバータワーズ ベイウエスト		119.43	38	2008	
29	Park Tower Yokohama Port Side パークタワー横濱ポートサイド		119.26	34	2008	
30	Yokohama Bay Sheraton Hotel & Towers 横浜ベイシェラトン ホテル&タワーズ		114.8	28	1998	
31	Yumeooka Office Tower ゆめおおおかオフィスタワー		113.0	24	1997	
32	Yokohama Gate Tower 横濱ゲートタワー		109.56	21	2021	
33	Queen's Tower C クイーンズタワーC		109.1	21	1997	
34	Royal Tower Yokohama Tsurumi ロイヤルタワー横濱鶴見		108.86	31	2010	
35	Yokohama Port Side Roa Ichibankan ロア壱番館	—	108.0	33	1994	
N/A	Yokohama Marine Tower 横浜マリンタワー	—	106	30	1961	Observation tower and lighthouse. Added for comparison purposes.
36	Cotton Harbor Towers Sea West コットンハーバータワーズ シーウエスト	—	105.8	32	2006	
37	FSI Headquarters 富士ソフト本社ビル		105.0	21	2004	
38	Pan Pacific Yokohama Bay Hotel Tokyu 横浜ベイホテル東急		105.0	25	1997	
39	Yokohama Media Tower 横浜メディアタワー		104.6	23	1999	Its total height, including the antenna mast, is 253 meters (830 ft).
40	New City Higashitotsuka Be TOWER ニューシティ東戸塚 Be TOWER	—	104.01	32	2006	
41	Park Tower Higashitotsuka パークタワー東戸塚	—	103.6	32	2005	
42	New City Higashitotsuka Le Parxiel ニューシティ東戸塚 ル・パルクシエル	—	103.0	32	2002	
43	Cross Gate クロスゲート		102.8	25	2000	
44	Yokohama Tenrikyokan 横浜天理ビル		101.0	27	1972	

== Tallest under construction or proposed ==
=== Under construction ===
This list ranks buildings that are under construction in Yokohama and are planned to rise at least 100 meters (328 ft), based on standard height measurement. This height includes spires and architectural details but does not include antenna masts.

Rank	Name	Height (m)	Floors	Year	Notes
1	Minato Mirai 21 Chuo District Block 52 みなとみらい21中央地区52街区	179.8	29	2027	
2	BASEGATE Yokohama Kannai	169	33	2025	
3	Kitanakadori Kita District A-1, A-2 District 北仲通北地区A-1・A-2地区	162	40	2026	
4	Kitanakadori Kita District B-1 District 北仲通北地区B-1地区	162	42	2027	
5	Kaigandori Project A-1 District	100	21	2027	

== Timeline of tallest buildings ==
Name	Image	Years as tallest	Height (m)	Floors
Yokohama Tenrikyokan 横浜天理ビル		1972–1991	101.0	27
InterContinental Yokohama Grand ヨコハマグランドインターコンチネンタルホテル		1991–1992	140.0	31
Shin-Yokohama Prince Hotel 新横浜プリンスホテル		1992–1993	149.35	42
Yokohama Landmark Tower 横浜ランドマークタワー		1993–present	296.33	70

== See also ==
- List of tallest buildings in Japan
