= List of tallest buildings in Hiroshima =

Tall buildings in Hiroshima
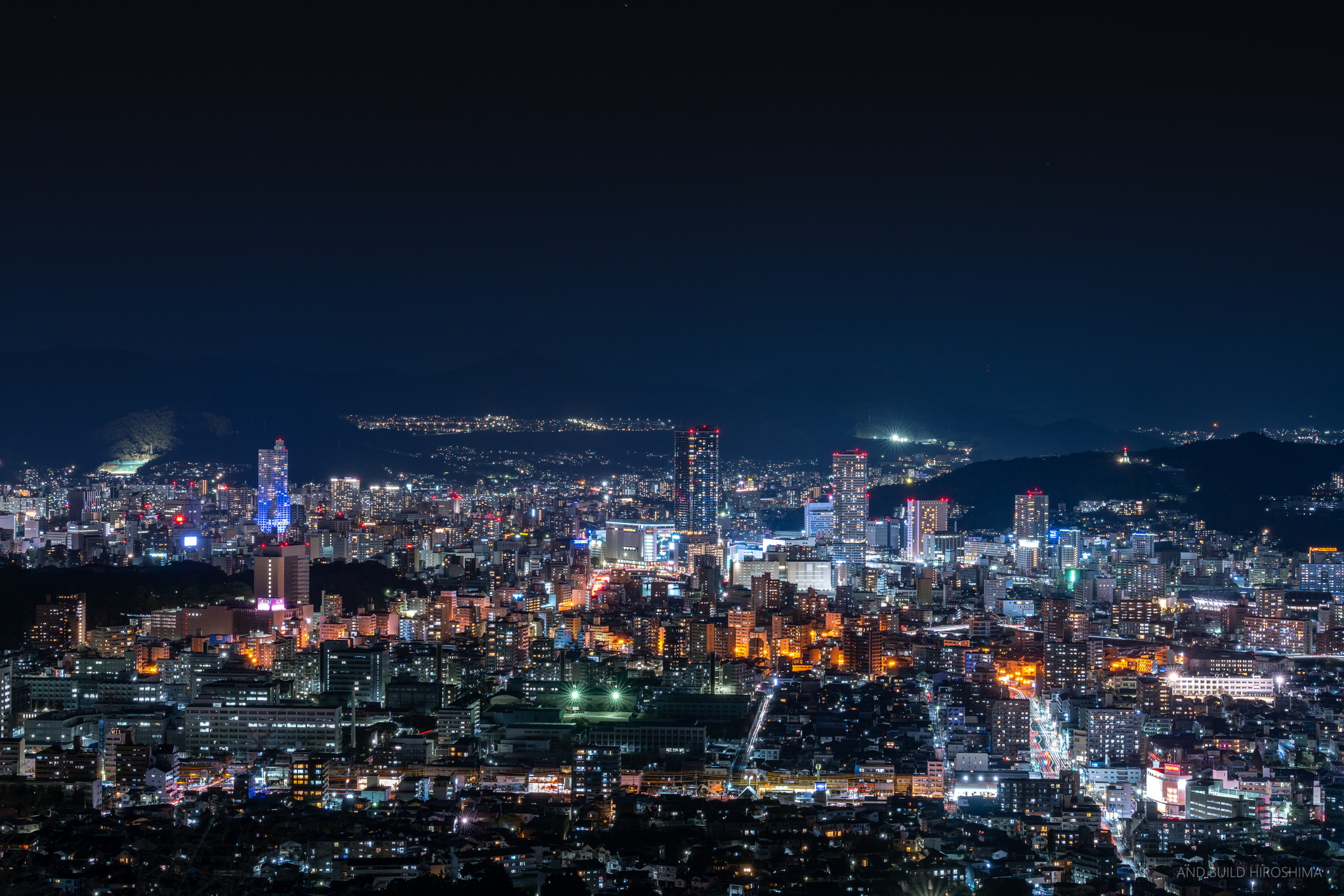
- Hiroshima's skyline at night in 2020
- Tallest building: City Tower Hiroshima
- Tallest building height: 198 m (648 ft)
- First 150 m+ building: NTT Cred Motomachi Building (1994)

Number of tall buildings
- Taller than 100 m (328 ft): 13 (2025)
- Taller than 150 m (492 ft): 5

This list of tallest buildings in Hiroshima ranks buildings in Hiroshima, Japan, by height. Hiroshima is the capital and largest city of Hiroshima Prefecture. As of December 2024, there are 13 buildings in Hiroshima that stand 100 meters (330 feet) or taller, of which 5 are at least 150 meters (490 feet) tall.

The tallest building in Hiroshima is the 198-meter-tall (650-foot) City Tower Hiroshima, which was completed in 2016. The city's first skyscraper with a height of 150 meters or taller was the NTT Cred Motomachi Building (Rihga Royal Hotel Hiroshima), completed in 1994.

== Tallest buildings ==
This list ranks buildings in Hiroshima that stand approximately 100 meters (330 feet) or taller, based on standard height measurement. This height includes spires and architectural details but does not include antenna masts. An equal sign (=) following a rank indicates that two or more buildings share the same height. The "Year" column indicates the year in which a building was completed.

Was the tallest building in Hiroshima upon completion

Rank	Name	Image	Height m (ft)	Floors	Year	Location	Notes
1	City Tower Hiroshima	View of a tall, slender, gray structure	198 (648)	52	2016	Minami 34°23′44.6″N 132°28′30.2″E	Tallest building in Chūgoku
2	Hitoto Hiroshima The Tower	View of a tall, slender, gray structure	178 (584)	53	2020	Naka 34°22′51.1″N 132°27′31.4″E	Tallest building in Higashi-Sendamachi
3	Grand Cross Tower Hiroshima	View of a tall, slender, gray structure	168 (551)	46	2016	Minami 34°23′44.2″N 132°28′38.9″E	
4	Urban View Grand Tower	View of a tall, slender, gray structure	166 (545)	43	2004	Naka 34°23′57.9″N 132°27′52.6″E	Tallest building in Kami-Hatchobori
5	NTT Cred Motomachi Building (Rihga Royal Hotel Hiroshima)	View of a tall, slender, gray structure	150 (492)	35	1994	Naka 34°23′49.5″N 132°27′27.6″E	Tallest building in Motomachi
6	NTT Docomo Chugoku Building	View of a tall, slender, gray structure	139 (456)	21	2004	Naka 34°23′08.4″N 132°27′14.1″E	Tallest building in Otemachi; Roof height: 115 metres (377 feet)
7	The Hiroshima Tower	View of a tall, slender, gray structure	110 (360)	33	2010	Higashi 34°23′53.4″N 132°28′44.9″E	Tallest building in Wakakusacho
8	Hilton Hiroshima	View of a tall, slender, gray structure	103 (337)	22	2022	Naka 34°23′10.9″N 132°27′43.6″E	Tallest building in Fujimicho
9	Oriental Hotel Hiroshima	View of a tall, slender, gray structure	102 (334)	23	1993	Naka 34°23′18″N 132°27′50″E	Tallest building in Nakamachi
10=	NHK Hiroshima	View of a tall, slender, gray structure	101 (332)	21	1994	Naka 34°23′26.3″N 132°27′19″E	
10=	A-City Towers West	View of a tall, slender, gray structure	101 (330)	31	1994	Asaminami 34°26′44.9″N 132°23′44.7″E	Tallest building in Ozuka-Nishi
10=	A-City Towers East	View of a tall, slender, gray structure	101 (330)	31	1994	Asaminami 34°26′44.7″N 132°23′48.1″E	Tallest building in Ozuka-Nishi
13	Hiroshima Garden Garden North Tower	View of a tall, slender, gray structure	100 (329)	32	2009	Naka 34°22′56.1″N 132°27′22.7″E	

== Under construction ==
The following table ranks skyscrapers that are under construction in Hiroshima that are expected to be at least 100 m (328 ft) tall as of 2025, based on standard height measurement. The "Year" column indicates the expected year of completion. Buildings that are on hold are not included.

Name	Height m (ft)	Floors	Start	Finish	Location	Notes
Motomachi Aioi-dori District Redevelopment	160 (525)	31	2024	2029	Naka	
APA Hotel & Resort Hiroshima Station Tower	110 (361)	33	2024	2027	Minami	
JR Hiroshima Station Building	100 (328)	20	2021	2025	Minami	

== See also ==
- List of tallest structures in Japan
