= Tokyo Tower (disambiguation) =

Tokyo Tower is a communications and observation tower located in Shiba Park, Minato, Tokyo, Japan.

Tokyo Tower may also refer to:

- Tokyo Tower (film), a 2005 Japanese film by Takashi Minamoto
- Tokyo Tower: Mom and Me, and Sometimes Dad (series), a Japanese television series based on the Lily Franky novel of the same name; see Yūta Hiraoka § Filmography
- Tokyo Tower: Mom and Me, and Sometimes Dad (film), a 2007 Japanese film based on the Lily Franky novel of the same name
- The Tokyo Towers, a condominium complex in the Kachidoki district of Chūō, Tokyo, Japan
