= Act City Hamamatsu =

Skyscraper in Japan

Coordinates: 34°42′18.2″N 137°44′8.5″E

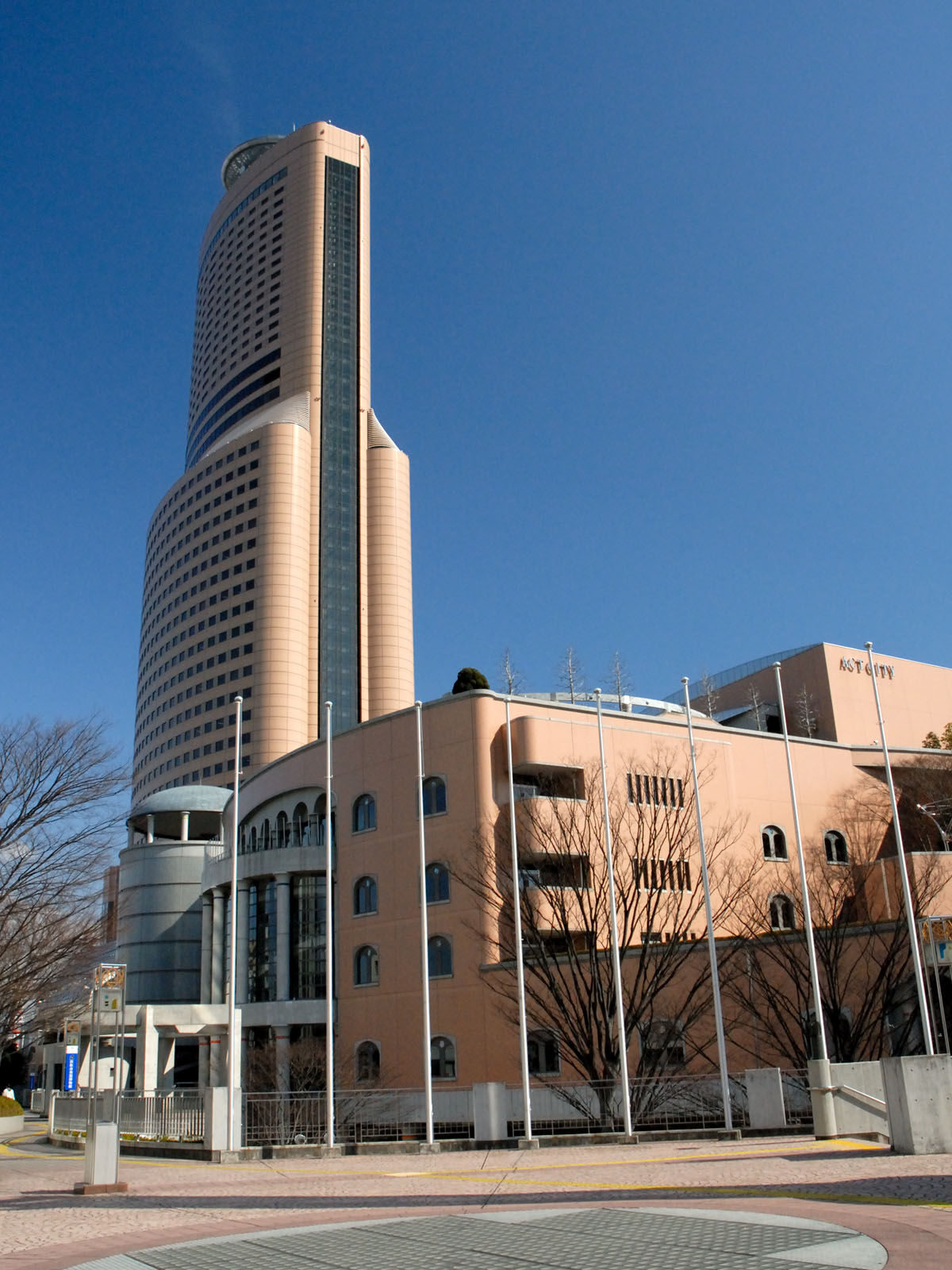

General information
- Type: Mixed Use
- Location: 111-2 Itayamachi, Hamamatsu, Japan
- Completed: 1994

Height
- Roof: 212.76 m (698.0 ft)

Technical details
- Floor count: 45

Act City Hamamatsu (アクトシティ浜松) is a facility consisting of four buildings in Hamamatsu, Shizuoka Prefecture, Japan. Act Tower, located in Zone B, is 213 metres (699 ft) tall and has 45 floors, making it the tallest building in Shizuoka Prefecture.

It was constructed in 1994, and houses the Okura City Hotel in its top 17 floors, as well as observation deck on its top floor. The building was designed to resemble a harmonica, acknowledging the musical instrument manufacturers headquartered in Hamamatsu that include Yamaha, Roland, Kawai and Tokai.

== See also ==
- List of tallest structures in Japan
