= Tofrom Yaesu =

Mixed-use development in Tokyo, Japan

- Right: Tofrom Yaesu Tower, Left: Tofrom Yaesu The Front interior

General information
- Type: Residential, Office, Retail
- Location: Tokyo, Japan, 1-chome, 6-9, Yaesu, Nihonbashi
- Coordinates: 35.68127°N 139.77072°E
- Construction started: 2024
- Completed: 2026

Design and construction
- Developer: Mitsui Fudosan; Tokyo Tatemono
- Main contractor: Taisei Corporation

Other information
- Public transit: Toei Bus: Tokyo Yaesu Bus Terminal

Website
- Tofrom Yaesu

Tofrom Yaesu (八重洲トフロム, Yaesu Tofuromu) is a mixed-use high-rise building development in the Yaesu ward of Tokyo, Japan. It mainly consists of the Tofrom Yaesu Tower skyscraper built between 2024 and 2026, the tower stands at 249.7 m (819 ft) tall with 51 floors which is the current 10th tallest building in Japan, the Tokyo Tatemono Pia Theater and the Tofrom Yaesu The Front building.

== History ==
The tower was constructed as part of an urban redevelopment project in the Yaesu 1-chome district of Chuo, Tokyo. The project was undertaken by Tokyo Tatemono, a comprehensive real estate company headquartered in Yaesu.

The redevelopment area named the "Tokyo Station Yaesu 1-chome East District Urban Redevelopment Project" is divided into districts A and B, also known as main blocks. Two distinctive main buildings were planned for each district, a ten-floor tower standing at 45 m (148 ft) tall for district A, and a 249.7 m (819 ft) tall tower for district B. In addition, in the second phase area of the Tokyo Yaesu project, the Tokyo Yaesu Bus Terminal was developed into the underground of district B.

In area B, the Tokyo Metropolitan Government established a cooperative in January 2019, approved the rights conversion plan in June 2020, and after the demolition of existing buildings on the planned site began in October 2020, construction started in October 2021. In the district A, the cooperative was established in February 2022 and approved the rights conversion plan in January 2023. Construction started in 2024.

On March 3, 2025, the name of the project was decided as "Tofrom Yaesu". The names of the buildings were given concomitant with the two blocks. Block A was named "Tofrom Yaesu The Front" and Block B was named "Tofrom Yaesu Tower".

The name " TOFROM " is a coined word combining "TO" and "FROM" and it embodies the hope that "people, things, and events from all over Japan, and indeed the world, will gather and connect here, and that this will become a place from which diverse values will be created and disseminated.

Both districts were initially aimed for completion in 2025, but were delayed due to the accidents described below, with Tofrom Yaesu Tower being completed on 28 February 2026 and Tofrom Yaesu The Ffont being completed on 15 July of the same year.

The Tofrom Yaesu Tower opened on September 10, 2026.

== Tofrom Yaesu Tower ==
Tofrom Yaesu Tower
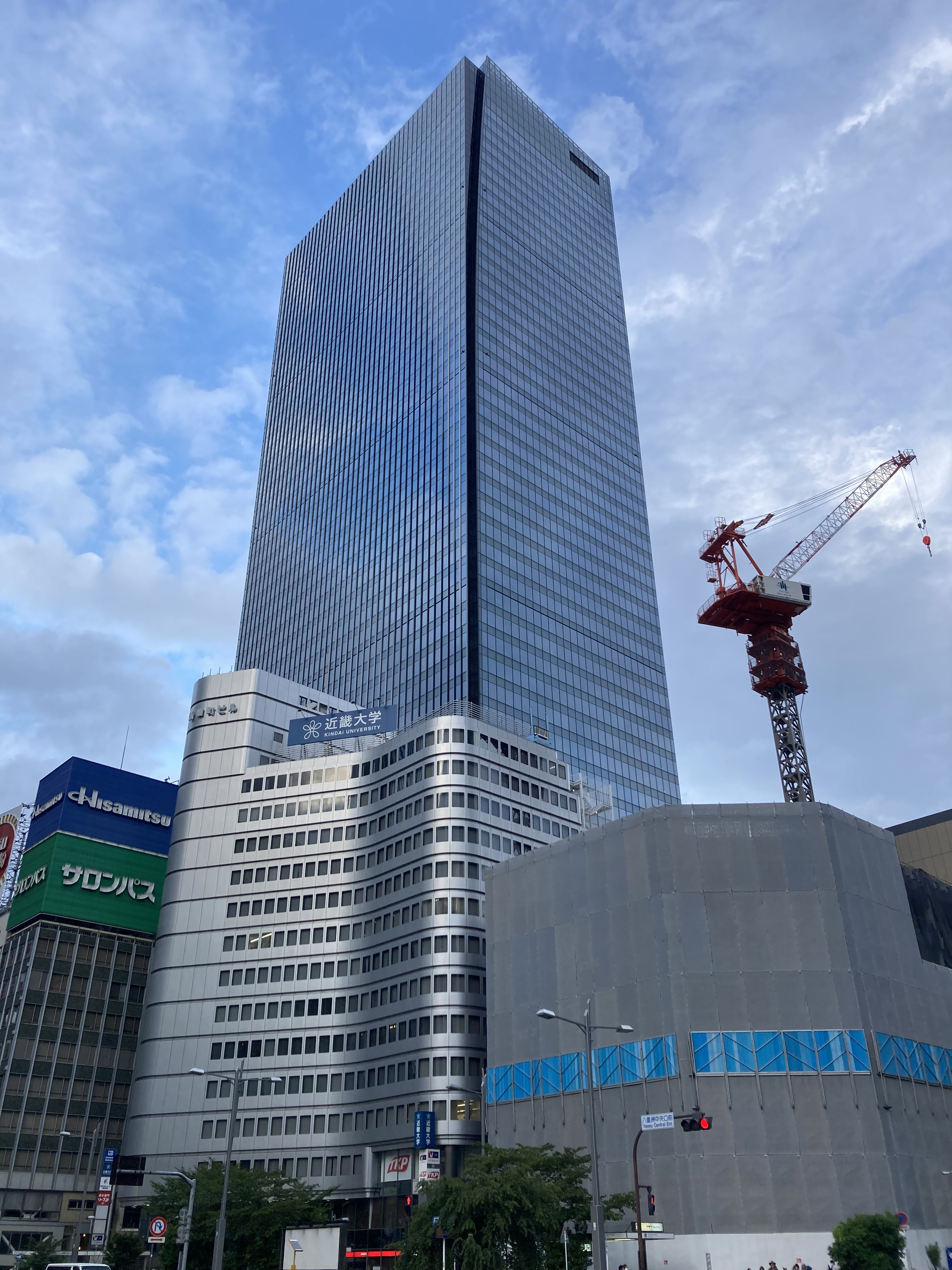

General information
- Status: Completed
- Type: Mixed-use
- Location: Tokyo, Japan
- Construction started: February 1, 2024
- Completed: February 28, 2026

Height
- Roof: 249.7 m (819 ft)

Technical details
- Structural system: All-Steel
- Floor count: 51 (+4 underground) (Main Tower)
- Floor area: 225,063 m^{2} (2,420,000 sq ft)
- Lifts/elevators: 32

Design and construction
- Architect: Obayashi Corporation
- Developer: Mitsui Fudosan; Tokyo Tatemono
- Main contractor: Taisei Corporation

=== Technical details ===
High floors (residential, office, etc.): Offices, high-rise lounges, etc. Mid-rise floors: Office floors, well-being floors, etc. To support the well-being of workers, the facility includes a terrace, a sky lounge, and a support facility called "Wab."

Lower and mid-to-lower floors (6th to 7th floors): Medical facilities (such as Nippon Medical School Yaesu Health Checkup Station) The "Nippon Medical School Yaesu Health Checkup Station" offers advanced medical care, including women's health checkups, and provides services in foreign languages.

Lower floors (3rd to 6th floors): Theater and conference facilities (including a tiered theater operated by Pia, and facilities operated by Congres) Low-rise and basement floors (basement to 4th floor): Commercial facilities (shops and restaurants), with the Tokyo Yaesu Underground A bus terminal on the first basement floor. More than 60 stores, mainly restaurants, are planned, and connecting passages and an indoor plaza called "Hinokimachi Square" are being developed.

=== Architecture ===
The architectural design reflects the unique character of the townscape. Many of the shops are positioned on the street side, and the facilities are characterized by their outward-facing orientation. The lower floors feature a "box-stacking" design with uneven surfaces and gaps on the exterior walls, which is visually striking. The complex recreates the traditional Yaesu landscape with its rows of small buildings and street-level shops in a three-dimensional way.

With consideration for the flow of visitors, the connecting passages are designed to allow them to experience the "old and new" aspects of Yaesu. The building is surrounded by four surrounding streets: " Yaesu-dori," "Yaesu-nakadori," "Sotobori-dori," and "Sakura-dori," and three passages have been installed within the facility. By continuously connecting the flow of people throughout the town, an active pedestrian space is created, realizing natural circulation and interaction throughout the entire Yaesu area.

The symbol of the facility is the approximately 1,200 square meter "Hinokimachi Square," an open space that creates a lively atmosphere in the town. Tall trees about 7 meters high are planted in the atrium space connecting the upper and lower floors, and movable original furniture such as benches and tables made of "hinoki" (Japanese cypress), a name derived from the old town name, is placed there. In order to contribute to the community, it is also being considered for use as an event venue, and the entire atrium space up to the third floor plays a unified role in that regard.

A characteristic of the Yaesu area is the long-standing sense of unity among shops of varying sizes and types, and the fact that these shops are lined up along the street has fostered a sense of diversity and neighborhood identity.

The exterior style of the lower floors of the building is composed of stepped levels with uneven surfaces and gaps in the exterior walls, three-dimensionally recreating the distinctive character of this neighborhood. With an eye on creating a sense of unity with the town, numerous stairs and escalators were provided, aiming to create a streetscape typical of Yaesu that connects each floor to the town as if it were street level, and this was realized. Tall trees approximately 8 meters in height were placed on the first floor, and natural materials were incorporated into the spatial design in various places, such as wooden louvers on the ceiling and wooden panels on the stage eaves, creating a comfortable environment.

== Interiors ==
First floor corridor

Second floor corridor

Third floor

Fourth floor

== Tofrom Yaesu The Front ==
Tofrom Yaesu The Front's inauguration took place on July 15, 2026.

At approximately 9:20 a.m. on September 19, 2023, during the construction of the steel frame on the 7th floor of the B-area theater building, a 18-meter-long, approximately 7-ton beam that was being suspended by a tower crane fell immediately after being temporarily installed with bolts. This caused two previously installed 7th-floor beams, one main beam connecting the two steel frames, and the scaffolding supporting the joint of the main beam to collapse. Five workers fell in the accident, two of whom died. Construction was temporarily suspended as a result, but resumed on January 16, 2024.

On September 18, 2026, the Tokyo Metropolitan Police Department referred two employees of Obayashi Corporation, the company in charge of the construction, to prosecutors on charges of professional negligence resulting in death and injury, for making errors in the strength calculations of temporary support columns that supported the steel frame. The two employees had been warned of safety concerns by an external contractor, but it is believed that they failed to notice the error due to their own assumptions and did not change the plan.

=== Tatemono Pia Theater & Conference ===
Tatemono Pia Theater's entrance.

Located on the 3rd to 6th floors of the TOFROM YAESU TOWER, the 3rd to 5th floors house a theater, while the 5th and 6th floors are conference rooms (Tokyo Tatemono Pia Conference).

Tokyo Tatemono Pia Theatre is an 806-seat tiered theater suitable for theatrical performances such as straight plays and musicals, as well as music concerts, seminars, and ceremonies. Tokyo Tatemono Pia Conference… An area consisting of a large hall "TO YAESU HALL" (maximum 828 seats), a small hall "FROM YAESU HALL" (maximum 140 seats), and 10 conference rooms, suitable for seminars, lectures, and small to medium-sized parties and events.

== See also ==
- List of tallest buildings in Japan
- List of tallest structures in Tokyo
