= Tokyu Kabukicho Tower =

Skyscraper in Tokyo, Japan

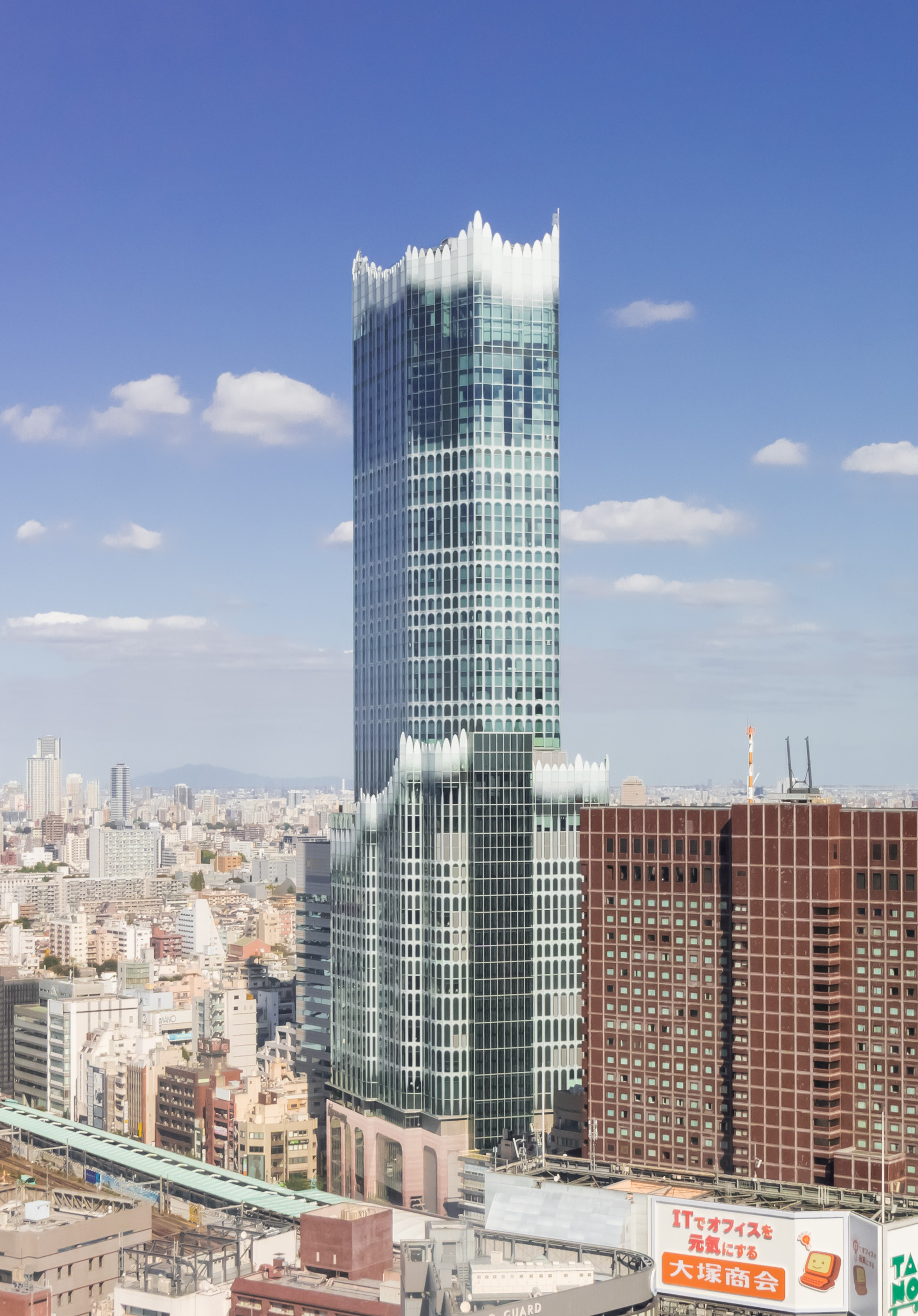
- Tokyu Kabukicho Tower in 2023
- Interactive map of the Tokyu Kabukicho Tower area

General information
- Status: Completed
- Type: Mixed-use
- Architectural style: Postmodern
- Location: Kabukichō, Shinjuku, Tokyo, Japan
- Coordinates: 35°41′45″N 139°42′2″E
- Construction started: 1 August 2019
- Completed: 11 January 2023
- Opened: 14 April 2023
- Owner: Tokyu Recreation and Tokyu Corporation

Height
- Height: 225 m (738 ft)

Technical details
- Structural system: Steel; Reinforced concrete
- Floor count: 48
- Floor area: 87,421 m^{2} (940,990 sq ft)

Design and construction
- Architecture firm: Yuko Nagayama & Associates; Kume Sekkei
- Developer: Shimizu Corporation

Website
- tokyu-kabukicho-tower.jp

Tokyu Kabukicho Tower (東急歌舞伎町タワー, Tōkyū Kabukichō Tawā) is a 48-storey skyscraper in the Kabukichō district of Shinjuku, Tokyo, Japan. The 225 m (738 ft) tower was designed by Yuko Nagayama & Associates and developed by Shimizu Corporation. It was completed in 2023 as Japan's 19th tallest building.

== Overview ==
Formerly known as Shinjuku Tokyu Milano Plan, the project's official name was announced by Tokyu Corporation on 18 November 2021. Unlike the nearby office and residential buildings, Tokyu Kabukicho Tower is centred on entertainment and recreational facilities, with movie theatres, hotels and art installations.

Development took place on a 4,603 m^{2} (49,550 sq ft) lot near the former Shinjuku Koma Theater. Construction began on 1 August 2019 and was completed on 11 January 2023; the opening was held on 14 April 2023.

== Design ==
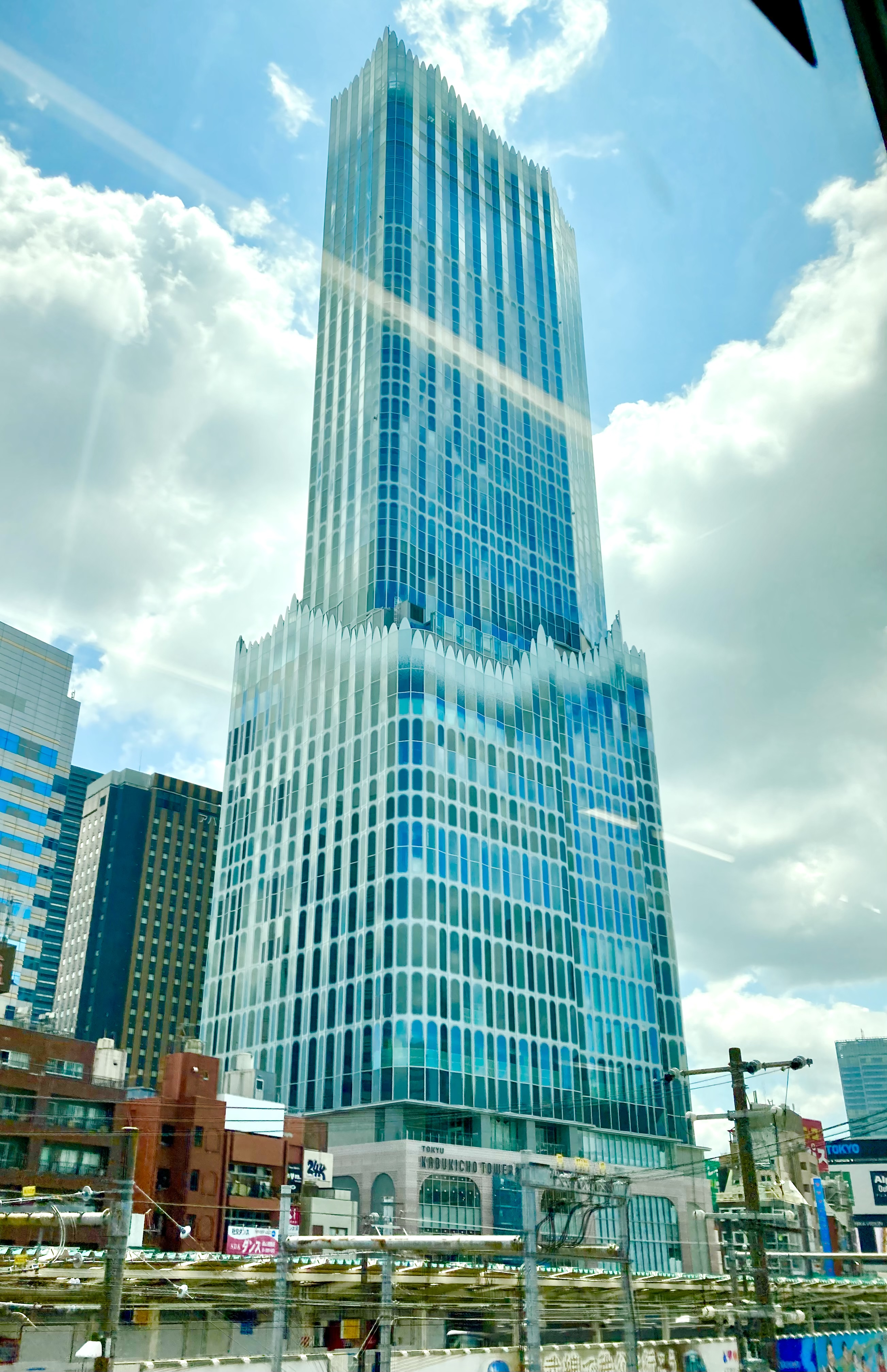
Tokyu Kabukicho Tower as seen from the Yamanote Line

The building is divided into three layers according to purpose: lower, middle and upper. In order to form a continuous skyline, the height of the building was set at approximately 225 m (738 ft) to match the high-rise buildings in Nishi-Shinjuku, while its base was set at approximately 110 m (360 ft) to match the height of the buildings around Kabukichō. On the first and second floors, an east–west passageway is provided to ensure continuity in the central district, while an outdoor screen and stage face the Cine City Square.

Architect Yuko Nagayama was in charge of the design. Inspired by the former river Kanigawa and by Benzaiten (originally a Hindu goddess of rivers), the tower was designed with the image of a fountain, while the upper part expresses the force of water stretching to the sky.

Tokyu Kabukicho Tower is Japan's first skyscraper designed by a woman.

== Facilities ==
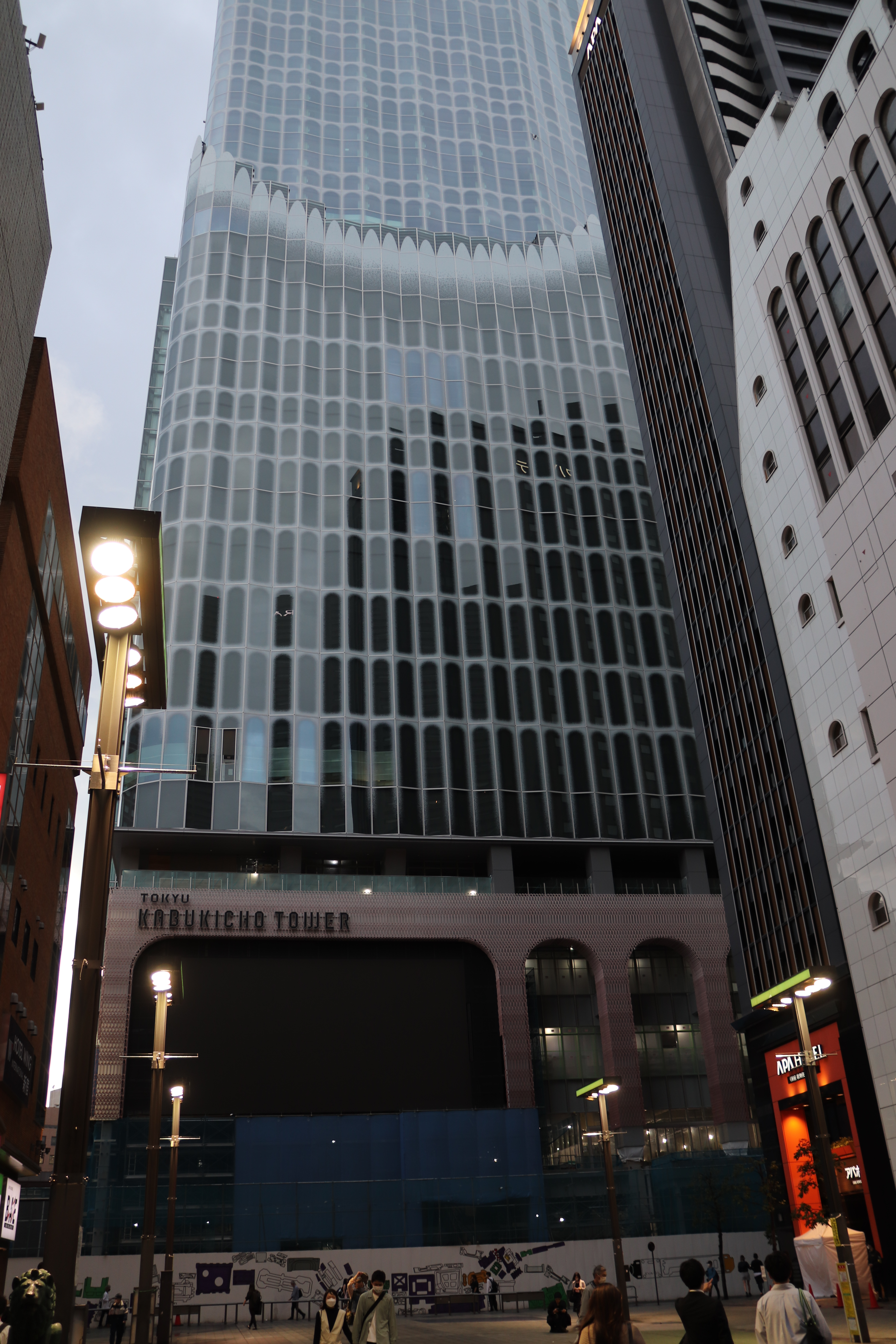
Entrance of the tower

=== Lower floors ===
Tokyu Kabukicho Tower's lower floors have two theatres operated by TST Entertainment: the Zepp Shinjuku from basement floors 1 to 4, which accommodates 1500 people, and the Theater Milano-Za on floors 6–8, with a total of 900 seats. Three floors are occupied by Zero Tokyo, Japan's largest night entertainment facility.

The Shinjuku Kabuki Hall, an entertainment food hall by Hamakura Shoten Seisakusho, is on the second floor. On the tower's third floor, Bandai Namco Amusements has an amusement centre, "Namco Tokyo" (officially stylized "namco TOKYO"), that stages events with anime, manga and video game characters. On the fourth is an attraction by Sony Music Entertainment named "The Tokyo Matrix". A wellness facility, "Existion", is operated by Milano 05 on the fifth floor.

=== Middle floors ===
The 109 Cinemas Premium Shinjuku, with 752 seats, is on floors 9 and 10.

=== Upper floors ===
The upper floors are occupied by two hotels. Hotel Groove Shinjuku is on floors 17–38. Bellustar Tokyo, a hotel by Singapore-based Pan Pacific Hotels and Resorts (at one time owned by Tokyu), is on floors 39–47, operating a three-storey atrium restaurant on the building's 45th, 46th and 47th floor.

== See also ==
- List of tallest buildings in Japan
