= NHK Kawaguchi Transmitter =

Coordinates: 35.827813°N 139.720377°E

The NHK Kawaguchi Transmitter was a medium-wave broadcasting station at Kawaguchi, Saitama, Japan, which was built in 1937. It used for transmissions on 590 kHz with a power of 150 kW, a T-antenna, which was spun between two 312.78-metre-tall guyed masts, which were 463 m apart and which were both insulated against ground.

The masts of NHK Kawaguchi Transmitter were until erection of Tokyo Tower the tallest towers of Japan and belonged at time of completion to the tallest man-made structures of the world.

The antenna was built as T-antenna and not as mast radiator, as the technology of building tall mast radiators insulated against ground was not very well developed in Japan at the time. After the completion of Shobu-Kuki tower, a 240-meter-tall mast radiator in Saitama Prefecture, NHK Kawaguchi Transmitter went out of service in 1982. In 1984 the towers were dismantled with a crane.

In the neighbourhood of the masts, in the 1970s a 110-metre-tall mast radiator was built. Today, the basements of the masts and the guy anchors remain there.

In the days following the Surrender of Japan, the transmitter was occupied by members of the faculty and students at Imperial Japanese Army's Signals School. This is known as the Occupation of the Kawaguchi Transmitter (川口放送所占拠事件, Kawaguchi Hōsōsho Senkyo Jiken). Later, the U.S. military seized it, and used it for the Far East Network.
