= Blue Front Shibaura =

Skyscraper in Tokyo, Japan

General information
- Status: Complete (Tower S)
- Type: Office, Hotel
- Location: Tokyo, Japan, 1-1-1 Shibaura, Minato
- Coordinates: 35.65103°N 139.75739°E
- Construction started: 2021
- Completed: February 2025 (Tower S); 2030 (Tower N)
- Owner: East Japan Railway Company (JR East)

Height
- Roof: 229.2 m (752 ft) (Tower S)

Technical details
- Structural system: Composite
- Floor count: 44 (+3 underground) (Tower S)
- Floor area: 267,425 m^{2} (2,880,000 sq ft)

Design and construction
- Architect: Maki and Associates
- Developer: Nomura Real Estate Development
- Main contractor: Shimizu Corporation

Blue Front Shibaura (ブルーフロント芝浦, Burūfuronto Shibaura) is an office skyscraper complex in the Minato ward of Tokyo, Japan consisting of two twin towers of which only one is currently built, the Blue Front Shibaura Tower S (ブルーフロント芝浦 S棟, Burūfuronto Shibaura tawā S), inaugurated in 2025, standing at 229.2 m (752 ft) tall with 44 floors.

The 166-metre (545-foot) Hamamatsucho Building (Toshiba Building) is adjacent to the South Tower and will be replaced by the 227-metre (745-foot) Blue Front Shibaura Tower N which was proposed under the same project and is expected to be completed between 2030 and 2031. The complex will serve as the headquarters building for Nomura Real Estate Holdings and its subsidiary, Nomura Real Estate.

== History ==
=== Development ===
The project is a redevelopment project of the Hamamatsucho Building (formerly the Toshiba Headquarters Building) jointly promoted by Nomura Real Estate and JR East. It is a plan to construct twin towers, consisting of Tower S and Tower N, expected to rise to approximately 235 meters tall, in stages on an area of more than 4 hectares that combines the Hamamatsucho Building owned by Nomura Real Estate and the Tōkaidō Freight Line branch of Line Oishio Line land (the former site of the car train stop) owned by JR East. Architect Fumihiko Maki was hired to design the building.

In October 2021, the construction of Tower S began on the site of the demolition of the Hamamatsucho Building Annex "Three One Plaza" and it was completed on February 28, 2025. After the demolition of the Hamamatsucho Building, Tower N will be constructed on the site, with the entire project scheduled for completion by March 2031. The demolition of the Hamamatsucho Building (165.9 meters tall) is expected to be the tallest demolished skyscraper in Japan's history (as of 2023, the tallest was the 162.6m tall former main building of the World Trade Center Building).

On May 30, 2024, it was announced that the name of the district would be "Blue Front Shibaura". According to the developers, the name of the complex "reflects the overwhelming sense of openness that this project offers, being at the forefront of the sky and sea in central Tokyo", and aims to create and spread a waterside lifestyle and connect Minato's bay area. The project's main objective was to contribute to the development of the latter, which at the time was knowing a fast growth.

On March 1, 2025, Tokyo Gas and Nomura Real Estate Energy announced the completion of the Shibaura Energy Center and the start of energy supply to Tower S. Furthermore, on March 5, it was announced that a green hydrogen power generation system had been installed on the Shibaura Green Walk (Minato Ward Special Ward Road No. 1198), a pedestrian walkway in the exterior area. On March 6, with the opening of the newly constructed South Exit (Shibaura Exit) entrance to Hamamatsucho Station, the Green Walk, which connects to Blue Front Shibaura, opened, and street restaurants also opened. (The Green Walk will be extended to Takeshiba Street in fiscal year of 2027 as Minato Ward Special Ward Road No. 1181, passing between Hamamatsuchō Station and Kyū Shiba Rikyū Garden, and will also connect to the North Exit of Hamamatsucho Station, Shiodome Deck and Takeshiba Deck).

On July 1, 2025, the Fairmont Tokyo, a luxury hotel by France's Accor Hotels franchise opened in Tower S, marking its first appearance in Japan. In August, the headquarters of Nomura Real Estate Holdings, Nomura Real Estate, and its group companies, which are involved in the development of the site, moved from the Shinjuku Nomura Building in Nishi-Shinjuku, Shinjuku-ku. A facial recognition system has been installed at the gates for entry and exit (access control) to the office floors.

Next, on September 1, 2025, a restaurant area facing The Green Walk named the "Green Dining Hall" and a restaurant area facing the Shibaura Canal named "Canal Dining Hall", as well as commercial stores, opened on the first and second floors of Tower S. The commercial stores include the first fashion specialty store that will carry fast fashion brands handled by FamilyMart. On the 5th of the same month, Blue Front Shibaura Pier, a pier facing Shibaura Canal, was provisionally opened. Initially, only temporary event boats will operate connecting to the Toyosu Senkyaku Banrai Mall and other locations, but in the future, there are plans for regular water bus services for commuting by boat, as well as plans for routes to Haneda Airport and the arrival and departure of cruise ships (restaurant ships).

In addition, the adjacent Shinohama Park, a municipal park in Minato Ward, will be incorporated into the city block, and the transportation network will also include boat transport that crosses the Shibaura Canal and departs from and arrives at Hinode Pier (Hi-NODE).

=== Architecture ===
Demolition of the Toshiba Hamamatsucho Building and the Hamamatsucho Building began in October 2025. Demolition of the Toshiba Hamamatsucho Building is scheduled to be completed in late October 2026, and the Hamamatsucho Building in late April 2028.

On October 30, 2025, Konica Minolta announced that it would move its headquarters to TOWER S by February 2027.

On December 1, 2025, Tanabe Pharma (formerly Tanabe Mitsubishi Pharma) announced that it would move its Tokyo headquarters to TOWER S in December 2026.

A trial run of the Hama Bus (tentative name), a circular bus operated by the Hamamatsucho Shibadaimon Area Management Association, which is scheduled to begin operation in fiscal year 2027, was conducted from November 1 to 14. A temporary stop was set up at the entrance on the first floor of Fairmont Tokyo in Blue Front Shibaura.

From December 5 to 25, 2025, the first Christmas season since the park's opening was celebrated with illuminations at the South Plaza on the first floor, which serves as the entrance to Tower S from Green Walk.

From March 28 to 30, 2026, the Blue Front Spring Fair, in collaboration with OZmall, was held at South Plaza and Hillside Plaza in Green Walk.

== Environmental considerations ==
Located on the south side of the Blue Front Shibaura's Green Walk, there is a green approach that aims to improve connectivity between Hamamatsucho Station and the Takeshiba and Shibaura areas, by developing planted trees and water features along a pedestrian-only road that is a Minato Ward road. Green Walk is planned with the concept of "urban nature bathing," which promotes the recovery of physical and mental health by allowing urban dwellers to get close to nature. It is designed so that people can choose how they like to interact with nature, such as enjoying the scent of trees or viewing it as a view from a cafe.

WELL certification: A building performance evaluation system that focuses on people's health and comfort. LEED certification: A system for evaluating the environmental performance of buildings and cities. It promotes the reduction of energy costs and resources. CASBEE Building S-rank: Environmental considerations such as energy conservation and the use of materials and equipment with low environmental impact. CASBEE Smart Wellness Office S-Rank: Evaluates the environmental performance of buildings for people working in them. In addition, it has obtained various environmental certifications.

== Gallery ==
Office floor entrance

Lounge for office tenants

Blue Front Sky & Sea, a lounge located at the 28th floor.

View from the Blue Front Sky & Sea outer deck

The lobby of Fairmont Tokyo (35th floor)

Fairmont Dining Cafe

Green Dining Hall

Canal Dining Hall

Blue Front Shibaura Pier

Hama Bus stops at Fairmont Hotel
The Green Walk
Passage area of The Green Walk

== See also ==
- List of tallest buildings in Japan
- List of tallest structures in Tokyo
