= Sumitomo Fudosan Tokyo Mita Garden Tower =

Skyscraper in Tokyo, Japan

General information
- Status: Completed
- Type: Residential, Office
- Location: Tokyo, Japan, 3-5-19 Mita, Minato
- Coordinates: 35.64517°N 139.74317°E
- Construction started: October 2019
- Completed: February 2023

Height
- Roof: 215 m (705 ft)

Technical details
- Structural system: All-Steel
- Floor count: 42 (+4 underground)
- Floor area: 199,705 m^{2} (2,150,000 sq ft)

Design and construction
- Architect: Kume Sekkei
- Developer: Sumitomo Realty & Development
- Main contractor: Obayashi Corporation

The Sumitomo Fudosan Tokyo Mita Garden Tower (住友不動産東京三田ガーデンタワー, Sumitomofudōsan Tōkyō Sanda gādentawā) is a mixed-use skyscraper in the Minato ward of Tokyo, Japan. Built between 2019 and 2023, the tower stands at 215 m (705 ft) tall with 42 floors, and is the tallest building in the Mita subdistrict.

== History ==
In addition to the office main building, the development also includes two secondary residential buildings, a new campus for Shotoku University's Early Childhood Education College, and a new campus for Shotoku University's Mita Kindergarten, and will be located near the Sumitomo Realty Mita Twin Building. The 42-story office building with four underground floors became the tallest office building in the Mita district area upon its completion. Sumitomo Realty is the developer, Kume Sekkei is the architect, and Obayashi Corporation is in charge of construction.

Approximately a year and a half after the completion of Tokyo Mita Garden Tower, on September 1, 2024, the aforementioned Mita Twin Building West Wing was renamed as the "Sumitomo Realty Tokyo Mita South Tower", and the East Wing was renamed "Sumitomo Realty Mita First Building".

== Tennant companies ==
Among the tower's notable tennants, eighteen companies currently share spaces in the building.

- FPT Japan Holdings Tokyo Headquarters (33rd floor)
- Cover Corporation Headquarters (15th floor)
- Kyocera Group Companies Tokyo Office (reception on the 23rd floor)
- AltX Head Office (20th floor)
- MOTEX Tokyo Headquarters (22nd floor)
- Unicharm Head Office (40th-42nd floor)
- BANDAI SPIRITS Headquarters
- ZEAL TEAM Headquarters (25th floor)
- Mitsubishi Electric Digital Innovation Mita Office (4th floor)
- Elematec Headquarters (26th floor)
- Takiron CI Tokyo Headquarters
- IVRy Headquarters (29th floor)
- Chikko Tokyo Sales Office (29th floor)
- Mitsubishi Electric Plant Engineering Co., Ltd. (8th & 9th floors)
- Daiwabo Information System Tokyo Headquarters (11F)
- Shionogi Healthcare Tokyo Sales Office (3rd floor)
- UACJ Headquarters (35th-36th floor)

== See also ==
- List of tallest buildings in Japan
- List of tallest structures in Tokyo
