= Akasaka Intercity AIR =

Skyscraper in Tokyo, Japan

General information
- Status: Completed
- Type: Office
- Location: Tokyo, Japan, 1-8-1 Akasaka, Minato
- Coordinates: 35.670098°N 139.74254°E
- Construction started: October 2013
- Completed: August 2017
- Operator: Akasaka Intercity Management Co.

Height
- Roof: 205.1 m (673 ft)

Technical details
- Structural system: All-Steel
- Floor count: 37
- Floor area: 178,328 m^{2} (1,920,000 sq ft) (total); 16,088 m^{2} (173,000 sq ft) (project area); 6,550 m^{2} (70,500 sq ft) (green area)
- Lifts/elevators: 37

Design and construction
- Architects: Nihon Sekkei; Akasaka District Urban Redevelopment Association
- Main contractor: Obayashi Corporation

Other information
- Public transit: Tokyo Metro: Ginza; Tameike; Namboku; Tameike; Chiyoda; Kokkai; Marunouchi; Kokkai

Website
- Official website

The Akasaka Intercity AIR (赤坂インターシティAIR, Akasaka intāshiti eā) is an office skyscraper in the Minato ward of Tokyo, Japan. Built between 2013 and 2017, the tower stands at 205.1 m (673 ft) tall with 37 floors, and is the second tallest building in the Akasaka subdistrict.

== History ==
=== Project ===
The building is a super high-rise mixed-use building constructed as part of the "Akasaka 1-chome District Type 1 Urban Redevelopment Project," a redevelopment project located within the "Asia Headquarters Special Zone" of the International Strategic Comprehensive Special Zone and the Tokyo Metropolitan Area/Waterfront Area (around Shimbashi on Loop Route 2, Akasaka, and Roppongi) of the Designated Urban Regeneration Emergency Development Area. It was built on a site close to the Tameike intersection where Roppongi Street and Tokyo Metropolitan Route 405 Outer Moat Loop Line intersect, and was completed in August 2017 and opened on September 29.

In the Edo period, there was a reservoir in the vicinity of the site. The surrounding area was once a lush green area, but the reservoir was filled in during the Meiji era, and the greenery disappeared. Nippon Steel Kowa Real Estate (now Nippon Steel Kowa Real Estate), which participated in the redevelopment association and acted as a business partner, said it wanted to "revive the greenery and lushness," and positioned the high-rise building on the west side facing Roppongi Street, creating a green space of 5,000 m^{2} (53,800 sq ft). The constructed green space aims to resemble a satoyama (a traditional Japanese rural landscape), and along the greenway on the southeast side, a waterside space derived from the history of the reservoir was created.

In addition to the high-rise building, the site also features shops scattered throughout the green space on the southeast side. The high-rise building has 38 floors above ground and 3 floors underground. The first basement floor to the fourth floor above ground is a public area, and the fifth floor and above are office areas, with the office entrance lobby located on the second floor. The first basement floor is a shopping mall that connects to the subway Tameike- Sanno Station via a sunken garden. In the sunken garden, since terracotta was used on the exterior of Akasaka Intercity, which was completed earlier on the south side in February 2005, bricks and stoneware tiles and other earthy finishing materials are used extensively. The third and fourth floors house the high-grade conference room "Akasaka Intercity Conference". In addition, the fifth to twelfth floors on the southeast side house "Akasaka AIR Residence", a luxury rental apartment complex with a total of 52 units.

Nippon Steel Kowa Real Estate positions Akasaka Intercity AIR as its flagship building and moved its headquarters there in March 2018.

== Usage ==
=== Office rental overview ===
Offices are located on floors 6 through 37 (32 floors) Standard floor leasable area - 2,587.53 m^{2} (approx. 782.72 tsubo) *Additional core leasable space available Ceiling height - 2,850 mm (3,000 mm on special floors) Raised access floor - 150 mm (Special floors: 300 mm) Outlet capacity - 60 VA/ m^{2}

=== Structural features and BCP measures ===
Vibration damping devices (unbonded braces, tuned viscous mass dampers, viscous damping devices with amplification mechanisms) Damage assessment system Dual-fuel gas turbine generators, 3,500 kVA x 2 units (200 hours of emergency power supply, 45 VA/ m^{2})

=== Environmental performance ===
The building received the "S rank" certification in the environmental performance evaluation made by CASBEE. "DBJ Green Building Certification" plan certification also assigned the highest rank of Five Stars. Achieved the highest rank of "AAA" from the Tokyo Metropolitan Government's Energy Conservation Performance Evaluation System for featuring an energy consumption monitoring system.

"Intercity" is the flagship brand of Nippon Steel Kowa Real Estate's large-scale mixed-use office buildings, derived from the idea of "connecting cities", and "Akasaka Intercity AIR" is the fifth project in the "Intercity" series.

"AIR" embodies the business concept of "becoming the face of Tokyo, an international city chosen by the world," and is a comfortable town where everyone can live and work, surrounded by vast green spaces with a green coverage rate of over 50%. It evokes the atmosphere of a lush green town and buildings that reach towards the sky. "AIR" is also an abbreviation for "Akasaka Icchome Re-development".

== Tennants ==
=== Offices ===
- NTT Docomo Group
- Master Trust Bank of Japan
- HU Group Holdings Co., Ltd.
- SRE Holdings Co., Ltd.
- GlaxoSmithKline
- Haleon Japan Co., Ltd.
- Saison Information Systems Co., Ltd.
- Secom Co., Ltd. Tokyo Headquarters
- Nippon Steel Kowa Real Estate Co., Ltd.
- SKY Perfect JSAT Corporation
- Accenture Japan Ltd.
- Japan Bicycle Association
- JustSystems Corporation
- Akasaka Intercity Management Co., Ltd.

=== Store/support ===
- Lawry's The Prime Rib Akasaka
- Alegria Akasaka Intercity AIR
- Twelve Gardens Bar & Grill
- Welcome to Tameike-Sanno Store
- Crisp Salad Works Akasaka Intercity AIR Store
- Worker support
- Akasaka Intercity Conference
- Toranomon Hospital Health Management Center/Diagnostic Imaging Center

== Awards ==
- CASBEE Wellness Office Certification, S Rank (2019)
- BCS Award (2019)
- Good Design Award (Japan) (2018)

== Akasaka-Toranomon Greenway Project ==
The plan involves the local community taking the lead in promoting greening of the site, preservation and expansion of existing green spaces, and the creation of lush, green pedestrian walkways along Minato Ward Road No. 1014 (commonly known as the street in front of the United States Embassy), which connects to Loop Road No. 2 (Tokyo Metropolitan Road No. 405 Outer Moat Loop Line), in order to develop a large-scale greenway space that is integrated with the ward road and its street trees.

In line with the concept, the Akasaka-Toranomon Greenway Development Promotion Council was established in 2009 under the leadership of Nippon Steel Kowa Real Estate, with participation from Nippon Sekkei, Mori Building Company, Mitsui Fudosan, and the Urban Renaissance Agency. The approximately 200 m street tree space on the south side of the site was developed based on this plan.

== See also ==
- List of tallest buildings in Japan
- List of tallest structures in Tokyo
