= Yokohama Landmark Tower =

Third tallest building in Japan

- 横浜ランドマークタワー

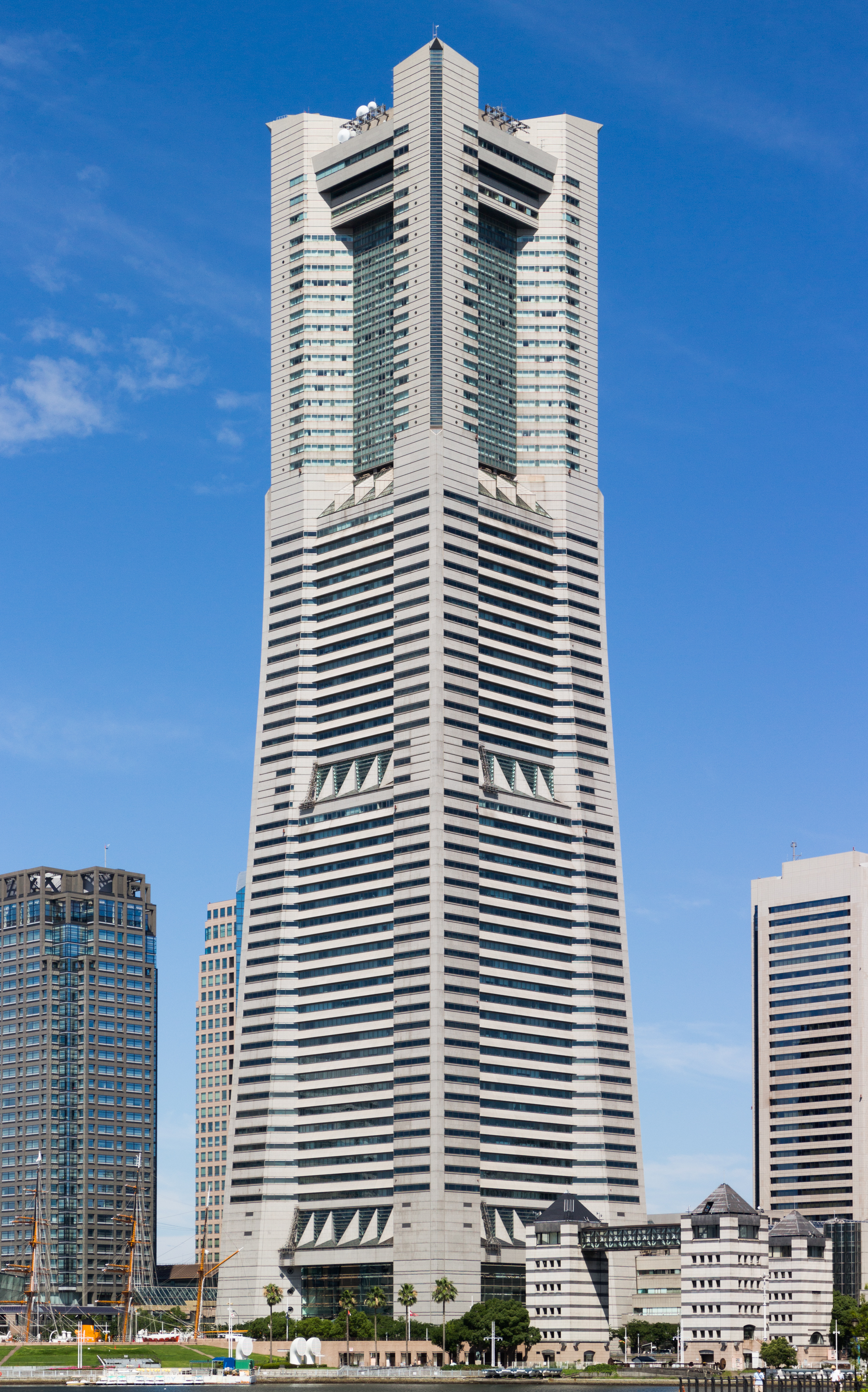
- Yokohama Landmark Tower, July 2015

Record height
- Tallest in Japan from 1993 to 2014^{[I]}
- Preceded by: Tokyo Metropolitan Government Building
- Surpassed by: Abeno Harukas

General information
- Location: Minato Mirai, Nishi-ku, Yokohama, Japan
- Coordinates: 35°27′17″N 139°37′54″E
- Construction started: 20 March 1990
- Completed: 1993
- Opening: 16 July 1993
- Cost: ¥270 billion
- Owner: Mitsubishi Estate Co.

Height
- Architectural: 296.3 m (972 ft)
- Top floor: 277 m (909 ft)
- Observatory: 273 m (896 ft)

Technical details
- Floor count: 73
- Floor area: 292,791 m^{2} (3,151,580 ft^{2})
- Lifts/elevators: 79 by Mitsubishi Electric

Design and construction
- Architects: Mitsubishi Jisho Sekkei and Hugh Stubbins and Associates
- Main contractor: Shimizu Corporation

The Yokohama Landmark Tower (横浜ランドマークタワー, Yokohama Randomāku Tawā) is the third tallest building and fifth tallest structure in Japan, standing 296.3 m (972 ft) high. Until surpassed by Abeno Harukas in 2014, it stood as the tallest building in Japan. It is located in the Minato Mirai 21 district of Yokohama city, next to the Yokohama Museum of Art.

The building contains a five-star hotel, the Yokohama Royal Park Hotel, which occupies floors 49–70, with 603 rooms in total. In April 2025, the hotel was closed for renovations. The lower 48 floors contain shops, restaurants, clinics, and offices. The building contains two tuned mass dampers on the (hidden) 71st floor on opposite corners of the building.

On the 69th floor there is an observatory, Sky Garden, from which one can see a 360-degree view of the city and, on clear days, Mount Fuji. The observation deck ‘Sky Garden’ on the 69th floor of Yokohama Landmark Tower temporarily closeed after its New Year’s Eve operation on 31 December 2025, due to large-scale renovation work within the building. After the completion of the renovation, it is scheduled to reopen sometime in or after 2028.

The tower contains what were at their inauguration the world's fastest elevators (installed by Mitsubishi Electric), which reach speeds of 12.5 m/s (41 ft/s) (45.0 km/h (28.0 mph)). This speed allows the elevator to reach the 69th floor in approximately 40 seconds. The elevators' speed record was surpassed by elevators of Taipei 101 (60.6 km/h, 37.7 mph) in 2004, but the speed of this elevator's descent is still the fastest in the world.

The building was designed by the architecture and engineering division of Mitsubishi Estate, now Mitsubishi Jisho Sekkei and Hugh Stubbins and Associates, later KlingStubbins.

== Facilities ==
- Sky Garden (Observation deck) – 2F (Entrance), 5F (Exit), 69F (273m point)
- Yokohama Royal Park Hotel – B1F (Lobby), LF (Lobby), 3F (Entrance), 49–50F, 52–68F, 70F
- Office – 1F (Lobby), 3F (Lobby), 8–48F
- Shopping Floor – 1–4F
- Tower Dining – 5F
- Clinic Floor – 7F
- Landmark Plaza – B2–B1F, 1–3F
- Landmark Hall – 5F
- Dockyard Garden – B2–B1F, 1F
- Parking – B3–B1F
- Mechanical rooms – 6F, 51F

== Tenants ==
- NYK Cruises (Asuka Cruise), a subsidiary of Nippon Yusen Kaisha (NYK). The headquarters are on the 47th floor.

== In popular culture ==
- Godzilla vs. Mothra
- Godzilla, Mothra and King Ghidorah: Giant Monsters All-Out Attack

== See also ==
- List of tallest buildings in Japan
- List of public observation decks

Records
Preceded by Tokyo Metropolitan Government Building No. 1	Tallest building in Japan; 1993–2014	Succeeded by Abeno Harukas
