= Ebino VLF transmitter =

Coordinates: 32°04′36″N 130°49′44″E

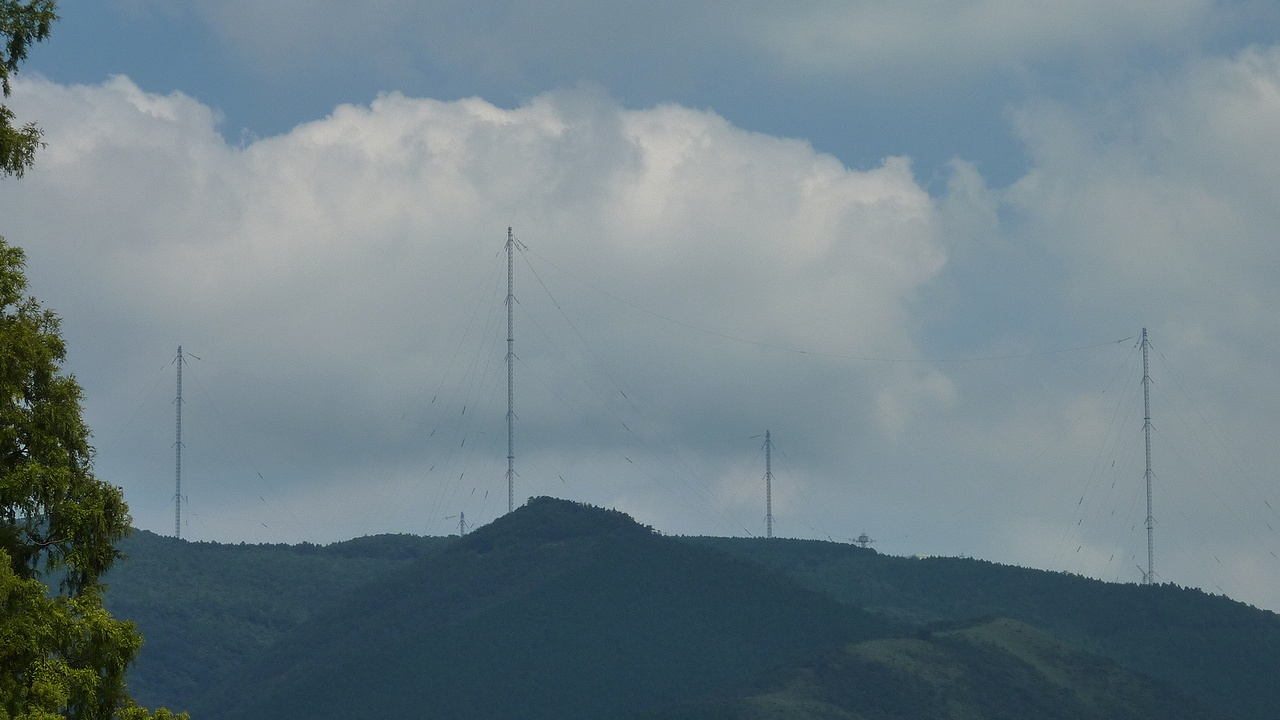
Ebino VLF transmitter

Ebino VLF transmitter (えびの送信所, Ebino Soshinsho) is a transmitting station of the Japan Maritime Self-Defense Force located in the city of Ebino, Miyazaki in Japan.

== Overview ==
The Japan Maritime Self-Defense Force has been considering the development of VLF transmission facilities since the early 1980s in an effort to improve submarine communications. The facility was completed in 1991 over local protests. It is the only operating ultra-long wave communication facility in Japan, with a frequency of 22.2kHz, an output of 200kW, and an identification code of JJI. It is to transmit orders to submerged submarines. The antenna system is arranged in two rows of four towers each, ranging from approximately 160 meters to approximately 270 meters.
