= GranTokyo =

Skyscraper in Japan

Coordinates: 35°40′54.1″N 139°46′8.3″E

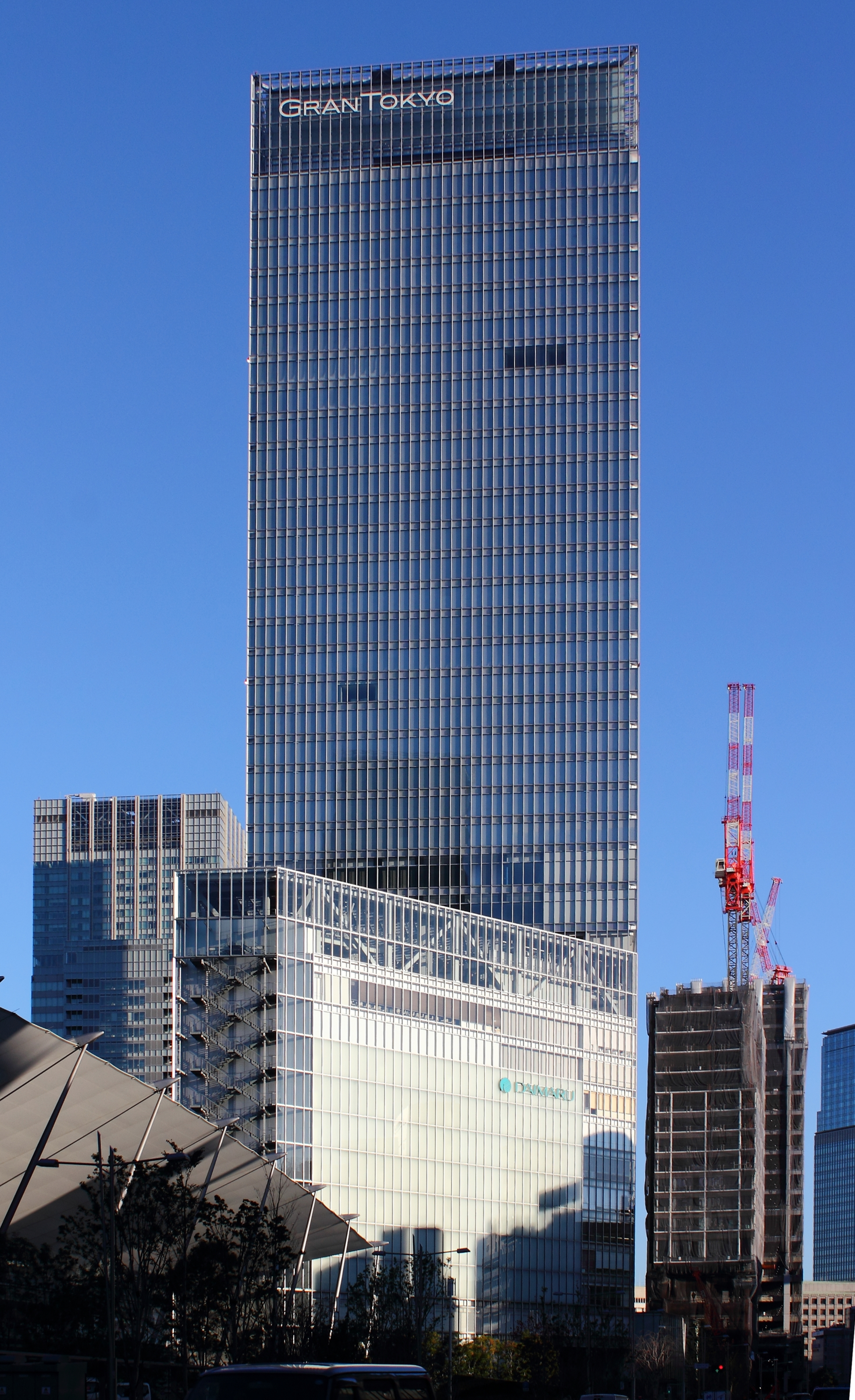
GranTokyo North Tower

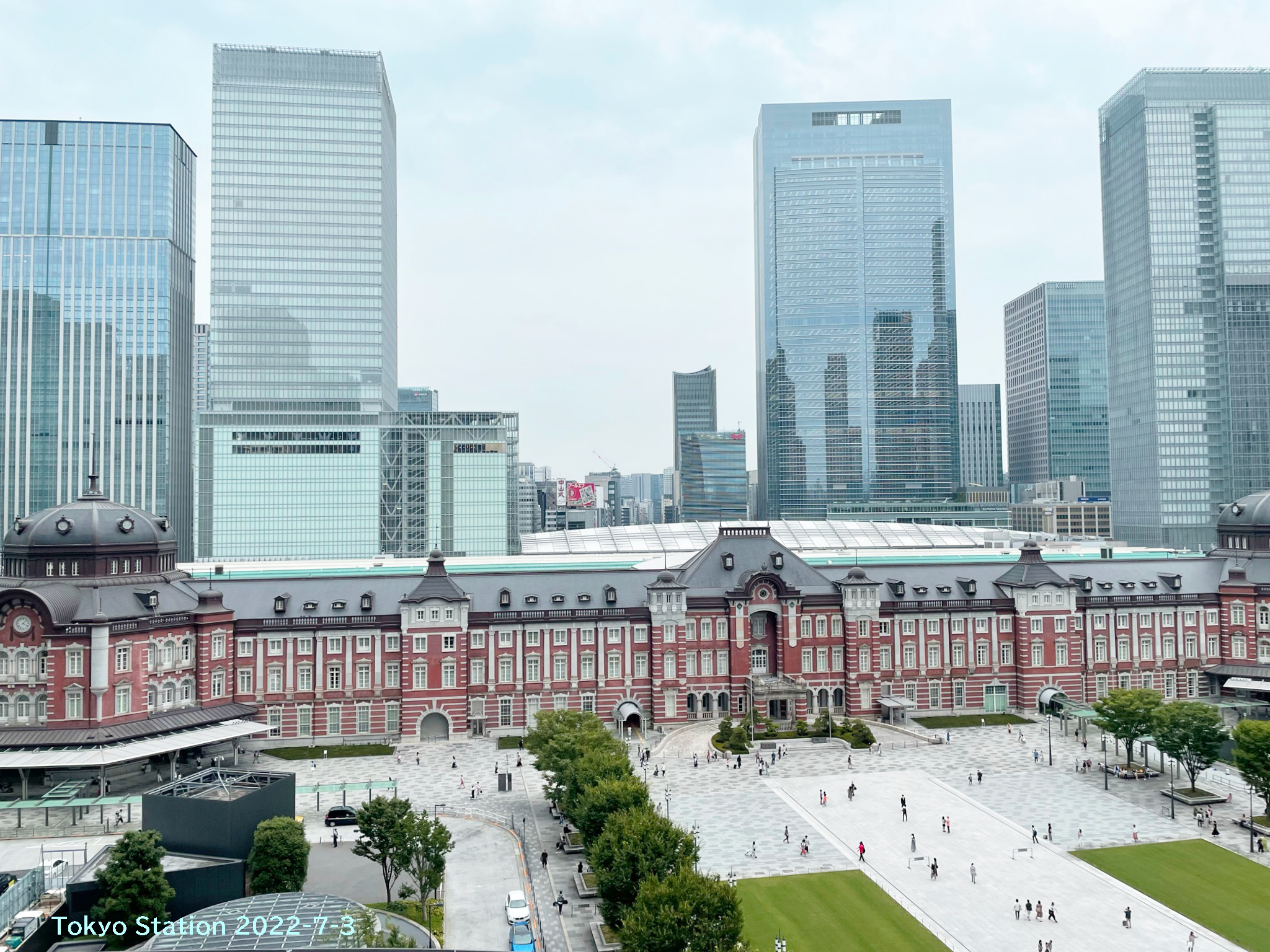
GranTokyo North Tower and South Tower

The GranTokyo (グラントウキョウ, Guran Tōkyō) is a skyscraper located in Marunouchi, Tokyo, Japan. Construction of the 205-metre tower was finished in 2007. The first fourteen floors of the building are occupied by a Daimaru department store.
