= List of cities in Hiroshima Prefecture by population =

The following list sorts all cities (including towns) in the Japanese prefecture of Hiroshima with a population of more than 5,000 according to the 2020 Census. As of October 1, 2020, 22 places fulfill this criterion and are listed here. This list refers only to the population of individual cities, towns and villages within their defined limits, which does not include other municipalities or suburban areas within urban agglomerations.

== List ==
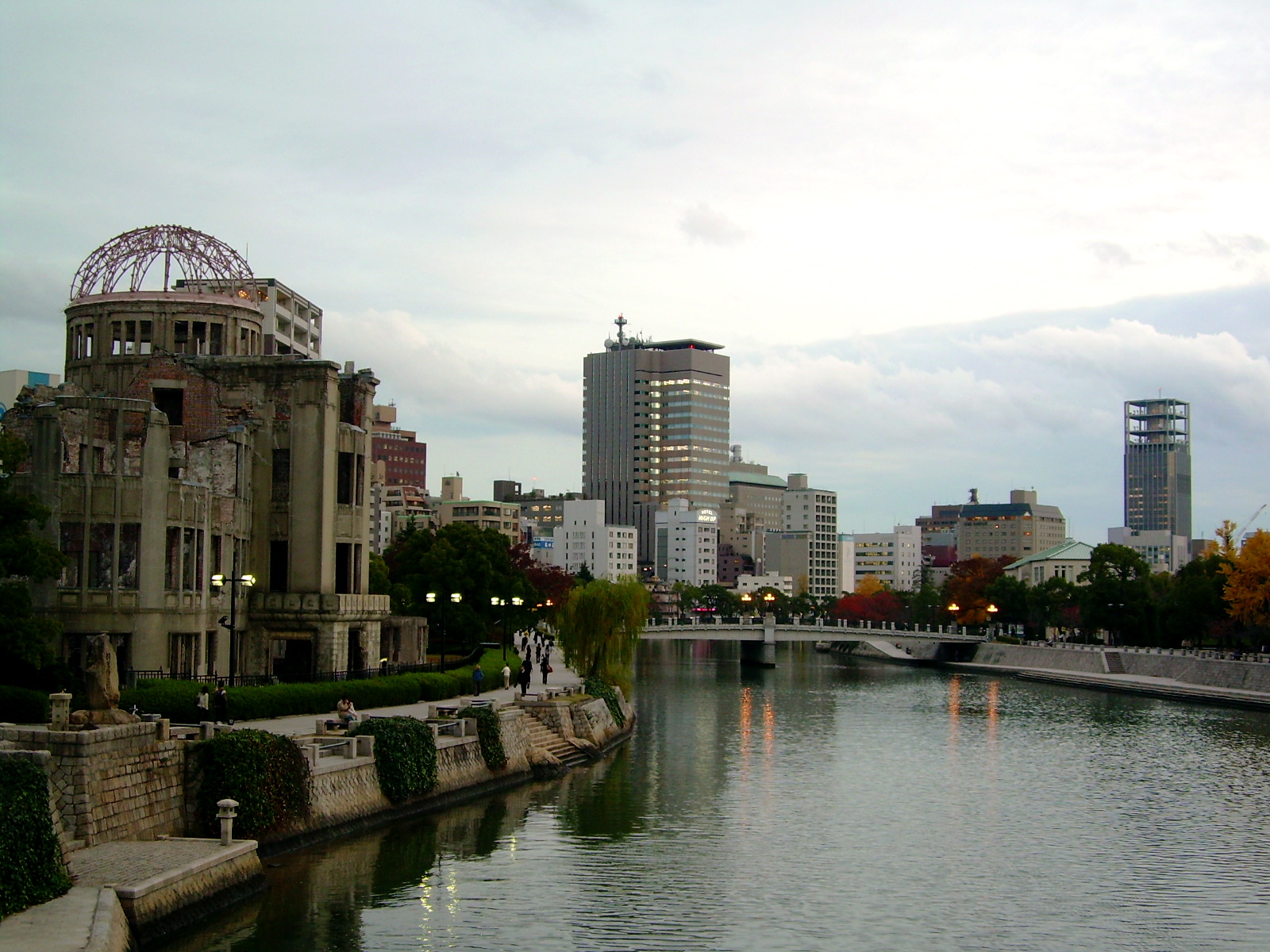
Hiroshima

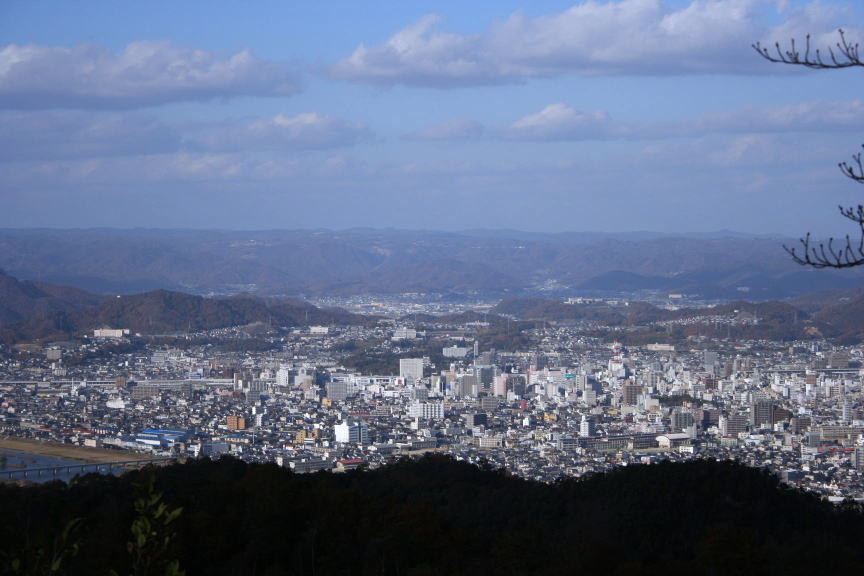
Fukuyama

The following table lists the 22 cities and towns in Hiroshima with a population of at least 5,000 on October 1, 2020, according to the 2020 Census. The table also gives an overview of the evolution of the population since the 1995 census.

Rank (2020)	Name	Status	2020	2015	2010	2005	2000	1995
1	Hiroshima	City	1,201,281	1,194,034	1,173,843	1,154,391	1,134,134	1,117,117
2	Fukuyama	City	461,268	464,811	461,357	459,087	456,908	453,791
3	Kure	City	214,717	228,552	239,973	251,003	259,224	270,179
4	Higashihiroshima	City	196,755	192,907	190,135	184,430	175,346	165,153
5	Onomichi	City	131,243	138,626	145,202	150,225	155,200	159,890
6	Hatsukaichi	City	114,253	114,906	114,038	115,530	114,981	112,591
7	Mihara	City	90,648	96,194	100,509	104,196	106,229	108,617
8	Fuchū (town)	Town	51,193	51,053	50,442	50,732	50,673	50,676
9	Miyoshi	City	50,722	53,615	56,605	59,314	61,635	62,910
10	Fuchū (city)	City	37,677	40,069	42,563	45,188	47,697	50,356
11	Shōbara	City	33,721	37,000	40,244	43,149	45,678	48,539
12	Kaita	Town	29,646	28,667	28,475	29,137	30,042	30,047
13	Akitakata	City	26,463	29,488	31,487	33,096	34,439	35,821
14	Ōtake	City	26,326	27,865	28,836	30,279	31,405	32,850
15	Takehara	City	24,017	26,426	28,644	30,657	31,935	33,451
16	Kumano	Town	22,844	23,755	24,533	25,103	25,392	24,953
17	Etajima	City	21,937	24,339	27,031	29,939	32,278	34,866
18	Kitahiroshima	Town	17,778	18,918	19,969	20,857	21,929	22,458
19	Sera	Town	15,143	16,337	17,549	18,866	19,690	20,735
20	Saka	Town	12,592	12,747	13,262	12,399	12,276	12,419
21	Jinsekikōgen	Town	8,259	9,217	10,350	11,590	12,512	13,218
22	Ōsakikamijima	Town	7,161	7,992	8,448	9,236	10,131	10,854
