= Shobu-Kuki transmitter =

Coordinates: 36°04′20″N 139°37′26″E

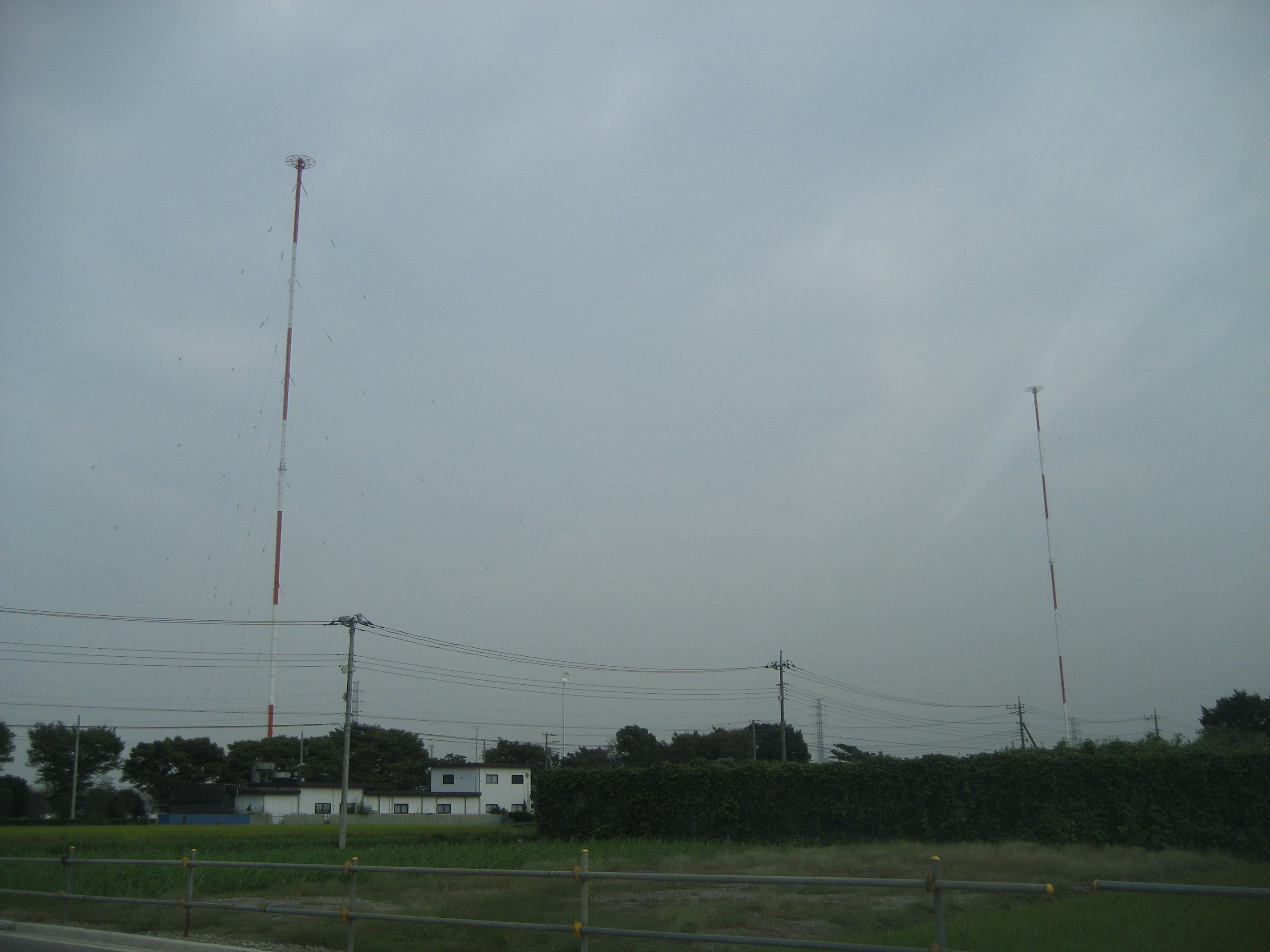
Shōbu-Kuki transmitter

The Shōbu-Kuki transmitter (菖蒲久喜ラジオ放送所, Shōbu-Kuki Rajio Hōsō-sho) is located in Kuki, Saitama. It is the largest centre for medium wave and short wave broadcasting in Japan. It is fed over a 60,000 volt power line and there are two large medium wave broadcasting antennas, one of them 240 metres tall. The centre is operated by NHK.
