= The Tokyo Towers =

Skyscraper complex in Japan

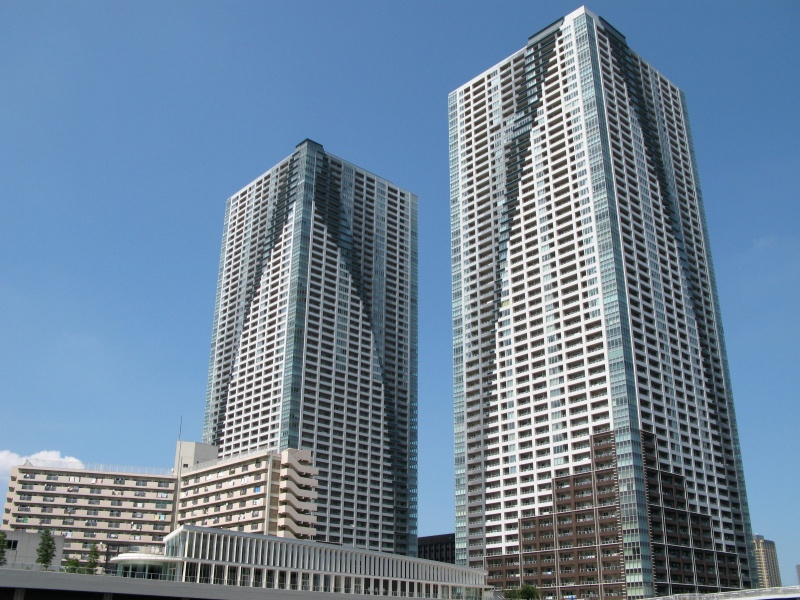

General information
- Type: Residential
- Location: Chūō, Tokyo, Japan
- Coordinates: 35.6556°N 139.7741°E
- Construction started: January 2005
- Completed: January 2008

Height
- Roof: 193.5 m (635 ft)

Technical details
- Floor count: 60 (58 above ground, 2 underground)
- Floor area: 383,345.47 m^{2} (4,126,296.3 sq ft)
- Lifts/elevators: 42 (33 passenger, 4 emergency, and 5 other)

Design and construction
- Structural engineer: Nikken Sekkei
- Main contractor: Maeda Corporation; Taisei Corporation

The Tokyo Towers (ザ・トーキョー・タワーズ, Za Tōkyō Tawāzu) is a condominium complex located in the Kachidoki district of Chūō, Tokyo, Japan. The complex is situated at the confluence of the southwestern section of the Sumida River and Tokyo Bay.

== Facilities ==
The complex consists of two towers: The southern Sea Tower (シータワー, Shī Tawā) on the ocean-facing side and the downtown-facing north Mid Tower (ミッドタワー, Middo Tawā). The two outwardly similar towers are currently the second-tallest condominium buildings in Japan, as well as each tower individually containing the most number of floors for a Japanese condominium at 58 apiece.

Other facilities include a golf range, a collection of low-rise buildings housing sports and fitness amenities, and the Seaside Annex (シーサイドアネックス, Shīsaido Anekkusu) alongside the neighboring canal.

Approximately 8,000 people are eventually expected to inhabit the complex. Unit prices ranged from ¥39 million to ¥216 million.

== Construction ==
- Height: 193.50 m (2 underground, 58 above ground, 1 tower level)
- Households: 2,794 (Owned: 1,981, Rented: 813)
- Site area: 29,718.37 m^{2}
- Building area: 20,663.65 m^{2}
- Total floor space: 383,345.47 m^{2}

Mid Tower

- Households: 1,461 (Owned: 648, Rented: 813)
- Site area: 12,690.69 m^{2}
- Building area: 9,453.76 m^{2}
- Total floor space: 183,585.55 m^{2}

Sea Tower

- Households: 1,333 (Owned: 100%)
- Site area: 17,027.68 m^{2}
- Building area: 11,209.89 m^{2}
- Total floor space: 199,759.92 m^{2}
