= List of tallest buildings in Osaka =

Tall buildings in Osaka
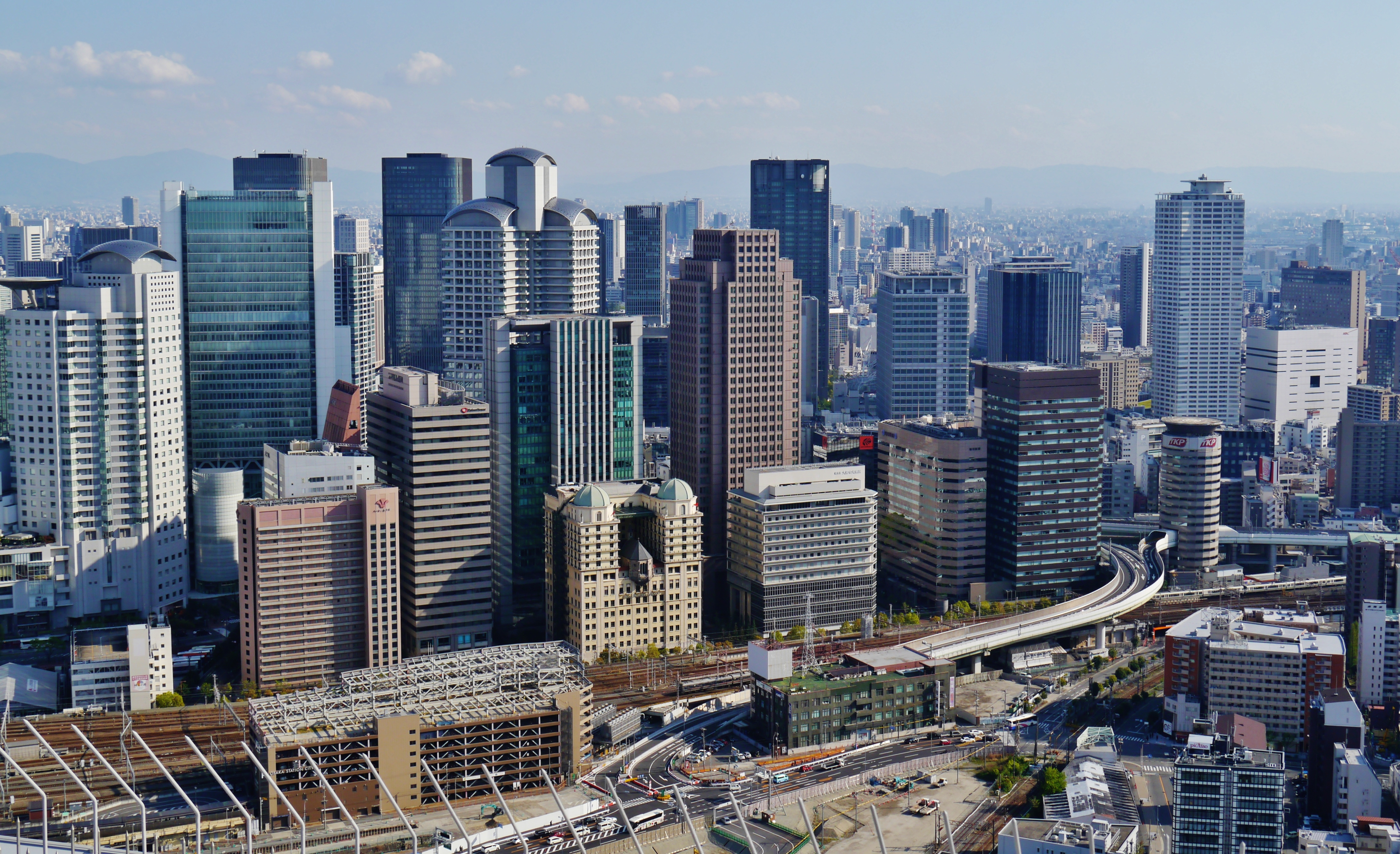
- Skyscrapers in Umeda district
- Tallest building: Abeno Harukas (2014)
- Tallest building height: 300 m (984 ft)
- First 150 m+ building: Twin 21 MID Tower (1986)

Number of tall buildings
- Taller than 100 m (328 ft): 250 （2025）
- Taller than 150 m (492 ft): 53 (2025)
- Taller than 200 m (656 ft): 5 (2025)
- Taller than 300 m (984 ft): 1

This list of tallest buildings in Osaka ranks buildings in Osaka, Japan by height. As of March 2024, Osaka has 5 skyscrapers above 200 meters (657 ft) and 48 skyscrapers above 150 meters (492 ft), of which 45 are listed by the Council of Tall Buildings and Urban Habitat.

Osaka is the third most populous city of Japan, and is the core city of the Keihanshin metropolitan area. Abeno Harukas, which was completed in 2014, is the tallest building in Osaka and the second tallest in Japan at 300 metres (980 ft). The Osaka Prefectural Government Sakishima Building, at a height of 256 meters (840 ft), is the second tallest building in the city. This height is matched by the Rinku Gate Tower Building in Izumisano, completed in 1996, which is not in the city of Osaka itself. The city's third-tallest building is The Kitahama, which rises 55 stories and 252 metres (827 ft) in height. Overall, of the 25 tallest buildings in Japan, 4 are in Osaka Prefecture.

Osaka has been the site of many skyscraper construction projects in recent years. Since 2010, 23 buildings rising higher than 150 metres (490 ft) have been completed. The majority of skyscrapers in Osaka are located in the ward of Kita.

== Tallest buildings ==
This lists ranks Osaka skyscrapers that stand at least 150 metres (490 ft) tall, based on standard height measurement. This includes spires and architectural details but does not include antenna masts.

Rank	Name	Image	Height m (ft)	Floors	Year	Coordinates	Ward	Notes	
1	Abeno Harukas		300 (984)	60	2014	34°38′45.6″N 135°30′48.2″E	Abeno	2nd-tallest building in Japan	
2	Osaka Prefectural Government Sakishima Building		256 (840)	55	1995	34°38′18″N 135°24′54″E	Suminoe	4th-tallest building in Japan	
3	The Kitahama		209 (687)	54	2009	34°41′21″N 135°30′25.5″E	Chūō	Tallest all-residential building in Japan; 22nd-tallest building in Japan; Tallest building completed in Osaka in the 2000s	
4=	Osaka Bay Tower		200 (657)	51	1993	34°40′9″N 135°27′40″E	Minato	28th-tallest building in Japan	
4=	X-Tower Osaka Bay		200 (657)	54	2006	34°40′6.5″N 135°27′37″E	Minato	28th-tallest building in Japan	
	Nanko Power Plant^{[A]}		—	200 (657)			—	Suminoe	—
6=	Nakanoshima Festival Tower West		199 (654)	41	2017	34°41′36.7″N 135°29′43.5″E	Kita		
6=	Nakanoshima Festival Tower		199 (654)	39	2012	34°41′36.7″N 135°29′48.3″E	Kita		
8	KEPCO Headquarters		196 (641)	41	2004	34°41′34″N 135°29′33.5″E	Kita	33rd-tallest building in Japan	
9	One Dojima		195 (640)	49	2024		Kita		
10=	The Parkhouse Nakanoshima Tower		193 (633)	54	2017	34°41′19″N 135°29′7.2″E	Kita		
10=	Umeda Garden Residence		193 (633)	56	2022	34°42′5.1″N 135°30′4.9″E	Kita		
12=	HERBIS Osaka		190 (622)	37	1997	34°41′55″N 135°29′34.5″E	Kita	42nd-tallest building in Japan	
12=	Osaka Hibikino Machi - The Sanctus Tower		190 (622)	53	2015	34°40′43″N 135°29′40.5″E	Nishi		
12=	Osaka Umeda Twin Towers South		190 (622)	38	2022	—	Kita		
15	JP Tower Osaka		188 (616)	40	2024		Kita		
16	Osaka Umeda Twin Towers North		187 (614)	41	2010	34°42′9″N 135°29′56″E	Kita	47th-tallest building in Japan	
17	Grand Green Osaka South Building		181 (593)	39	2024		Kita		
18	Grand Front Osaka Tower A		180 (589)	38	2013	34°42′15.6″N 135°29′41″E	Kita		
19=	City Tower Nishi-Umeda		177 (582)	50	2007	34°42′0″N 135°29′8.5″E	Fukushima		
19=	The Tower Osaka		177 (582)	50	2008	34°41′40″N 135°29′20.5″E	Fukushima		
21	OAP Tower		176 (578)	39	1994	34°41′39.5″N 135°31′11.5″E	Kita		
22=	Breezé Tower		175 (575)	34	2008	34°41′55″N 135°29′38″E	Kita		
22=	Grand Front Osaka South Tower B		175 (575)	38	2013	34°42′19.6″N 135°29′40″E	Kita		
24	Grand Front Osaka Owner's Tower		174 (572)	48	2013	34°42′26″N 135°29′38.6″E	Kita		
25	Umeda Sky Building		173 (568)	40	1993	34°42′19″N 135°29′23″E	Kita		
26	Grand Green Osaka The North Residence		172 (564)	46	2025		Kita		
27	City Tower Osaka Honmachi		171 (560)	48	2022		Chūō		
28	City Tower Osaka		170 (558)	50	2003	34°41′11″N 135°30′27″E	Chūō		
29	Branz Tower Umeda North		168 (551)	50	2019	34°40′39.2″N 135°29′50.3″E	Kita		
30	ORC 200 Prio Tower		167 (549)	50	1992	34°40′10.7″N 135°27′34.7″E	Minato		
31	Ciella Tower Osaka Horie		164 (538)	46	2024		Nishi		
32	City Tower Grand Tennoji		162 (531)	43	2007	34°38′37.5″N 135°31′3″E	Abeno		
33=	Applause Tower		161 (529)	34	1992	34°42′31″N 135°29′54.5″E	Kita		
33=	Osaka Fukushima Tower		161 (529)	45	2011	34°41′35″N 135°28′52″E	Fukushima		
35	Osaka Dojimahama Tower		161 (528)	40	2024		Kita		
36	Nakanoshima Dai Building		160 (525)	35	2009	34°41′34″N 135°29′33.5″E	Kita		
37=	Twin 21 MID Tower		157 (515)	38	1986	34°41′34″N 135°31′53.7″E	Chūō		
37=	Twin 21 Panasonic Tower		157 (515)	38	1986	34°41′36″N 135°31′51″E	Chūō		
37=	OBP Castle Tower		157 (515)	38	1988	34°41′30″N 135°31′58″E	Chūō		
37=	Crystal Tower		157 (515)	37	1990	34°41′31.7″N 135°31′43.5″E	Chūō		
41=	Meiji-Yasuda Seimei Umeda Building		156 (511)	30	2000	34°41′55″N 135°29′29.5″E	Kita		
41=	City Tower Osaka Temma The River & Parks		156 (511)	45	2009	34°42′29″N 135°30′58.5″E	Kita		
41=	Geo Tower Tenroku		156 (511)	44	2013	34°42′40.5″N 135°30′41.5″E	Kita		
44	The Namba Tower		155 (509)	46	2007	34°39′38.5″N 135°30′4.3″E	Naniwa		
45	Grand Front Osaka North Tower C		154 (505)	33	2013	34°42′23.6″N 135°29′40″E	Kita		
46	Laurel Tower Sakaisuji Honmachi		153 (501)	44	2024		Chūō		
47=	Osaka Metropolis Tower		152 (499)	46	2016	34°40′54.6″N 135°29′2.2″E	Nishi		
47=	Yodoyabashi Apple Tower Residence		152 (499)	46	2007	34°41′22″N 135°30′12″E	Chūō		
47=	The Fine Tower Umeda Toyosaki		152 (499)	45	2019	34°42′36.4″N 135°29′48″E	Kita		
50	D'Grafort Osaka N.Y. Tower Higobashi		151 (494)	46	2008	34°41′23.6″N 135°29′49.2″E	Nishi		
51=	Yodobashi Umeda Tower		150 (492)	34	2019	34°42′17.8″N 135°29′45.5″E	Kita		
51=	Ōsaka Station North Gate Building		150 (492)	29	2011	34°42′9.5″N 135°29′39.3″E	Kita		
51=	Yodoyabashi Station One		150 (492)	31	2025		Chūō		

= Indicates buildings that have the same rank because they have the same height.

== Under construction ==
This lists buildings that are under construction in Osaka and are planned to rise at least 150 metres (492 ft). Any buildings that have been topped out but are not completed are also included.

Name	Height m (ft)	Floors	Year	Ward	Notes
Grand Green Osaka The South Residence	185 (606)	51	2028	Kita	
Cielia Tower Nakanoshima	168 (551)	46	2026	Fukushima	
Park Tower Osaka Dojimahama	162 (531)	40	2027	Kita	

== Timeline of tallest buildings ==
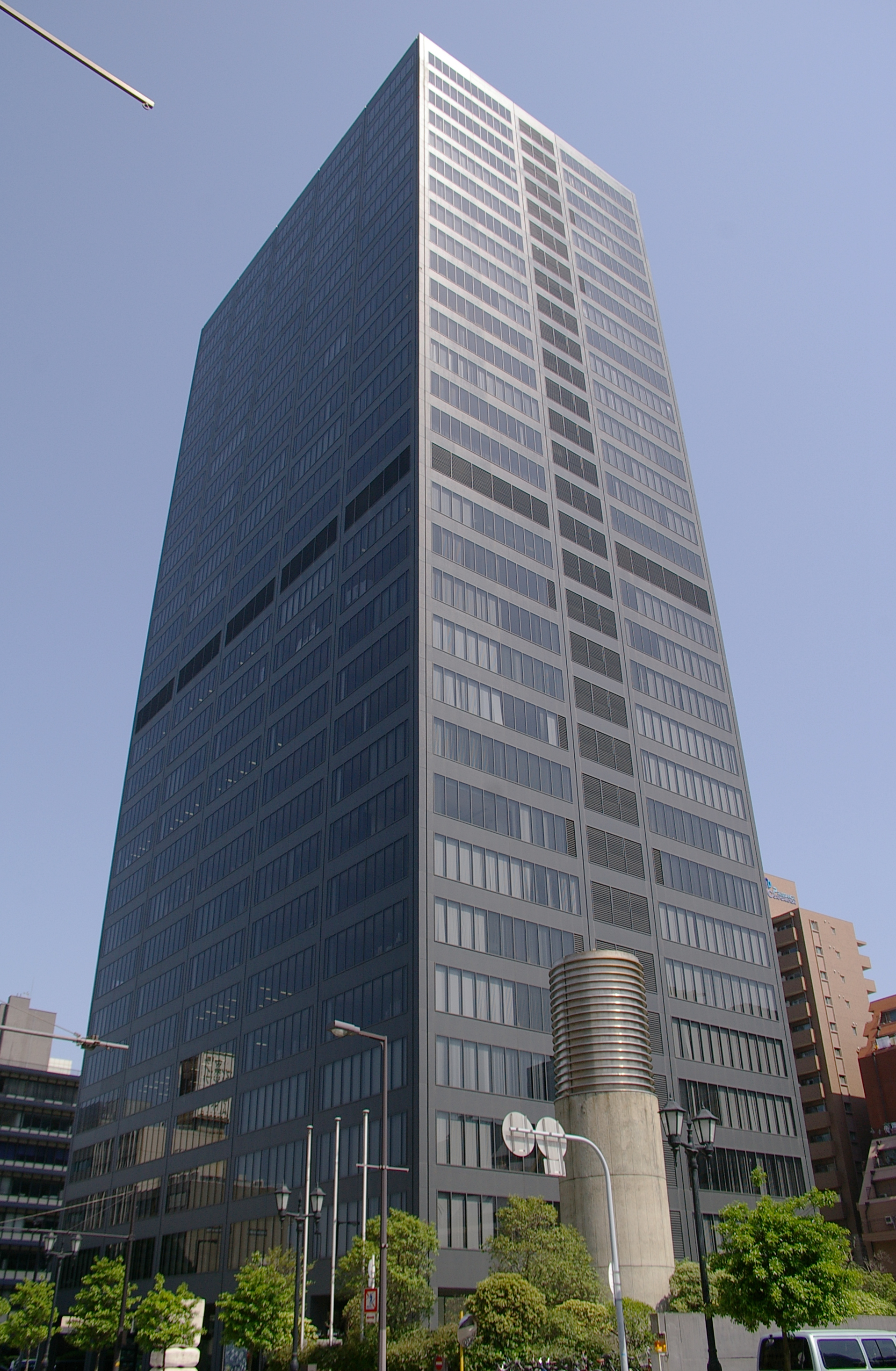
Osaka Obayashi Building

This is a list of buildings that once held the title of tallest building in Osaka.

Name	Years as tallest	Height m (ft)	Floors	Ward	Notes
Osaka Obayashi Building	1973–1973	120 (393)	30	Chūō	
Osaka Kokusai Building	1973–1977	125 (410)	32	Chūō	
Hankyu Grand Building	1977–1979	127 (417)	32	Kita	
Osaka-Ekimae Daisan Building	1979–1986	132 (432)	34	Kita	
Twin 21 Towers	1986–1992	157 (515)	38	Chūō	
OBP Castle Tower	1986–1992	157 (515)	38	Chūō	
ORC 200 Prio Tower	1992–1993	167 (548)	50	Minato	
Osaka Bay Tower	1993–1995	200 (656)	51	Minato	
Osaka Prefectural Government Sakishima Building	1995–2014	256 (840)	55	Suminoe	
Abeno Harukas	2014–present	300 (984)	60	Abeno	

== See also ==
- List of tallest structures in Japan
- List of tallest structures in Osaka Prefecture

== Notes ==
A. This structure is not a habitable building but is included in this list for comparative purposes. Per a ruling by the Council on Tall Buildings and Urban Habitat, freestanding observation towers, chimneys or masts are not considered to be buildings, as they are not fully habitable structures.
