= List of tallest structures in Osaka Prefecture =

Skyscrapers of Osaka

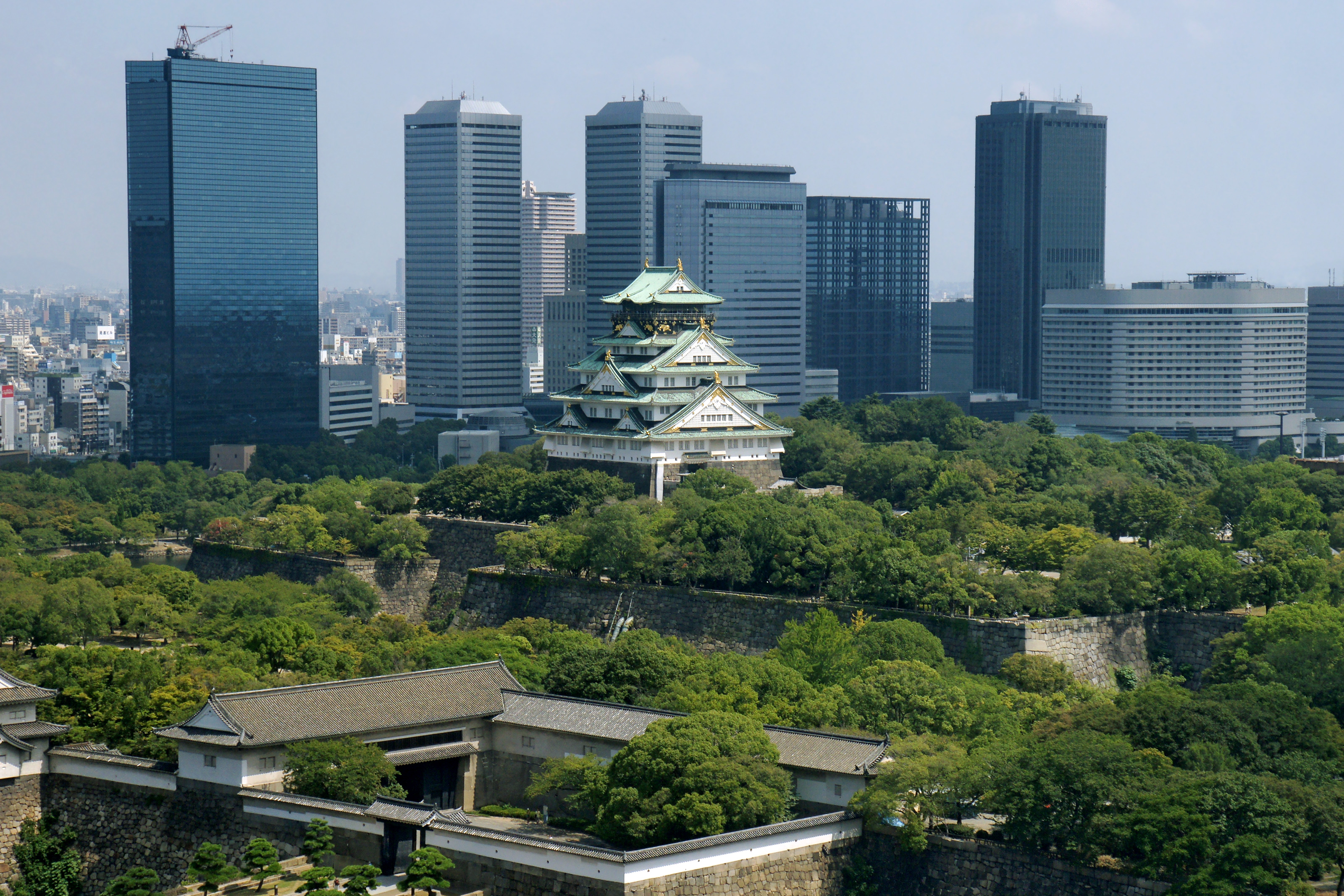
Chuo ward

Osaka Prefecture is the third-most-populated of Japan's 47 prefectures. In Osaka, there are 54 buildings that stand taller than 150 metres (490 ft). Abeno Harukas, which was completed in 2014, is the tallest building in Osaka and the second-tallest in Japan at 300 metres (980 ft). Both rising 256 metres (840 ft), the Osaka Prefectural Government Sakishima Building and the Rinku Gate Tower Building, which were completed in 1995 and 1996 respectively, are the second-tallest buildings in the prefecture. The prefecture's third-tallest building is The Kitahama, which rises 55 stories and 252 metres (827 ft) in height. Overall, of the 25 tallest buildings in Japan, 4 are in Osaka Prefecture.

Osaka has been the site of many skyscraper construction projects in recent years. Since 2010, 12 buildings rising higher than 150 metres (490 ft) have been completed. As of June 2015, three such buildings are under construction in the prefecture. Several other construction projects planned to exceed the height of 150 metres are proposed for the near future.

== Tallest buildings ==
This lists ranks Osaka skyscrapers that stand at least 150 metres (490 ft) tall, based on standard height measurement. This includes spires and architectural details but does not include antenna masts.

Rank	Name	Image	Height m (ft)	Floors	Year	Coordinates	City/Ward	Notes
1	Abeno Harukas		300 (984)	60	2014	34°38′45.6″N 135°30′48.2″E	Abeno-ku, Osaka	2nd-tallest building in Japan
2=	Osaka Prefectural Government Sakishima Building		256 (840)	55	1995	34°38′18″N 135°24′54″E	Suminoe-ku, Osaka	5th-tallest building in Japan
2=	Rinku Gate Tower		256 (840)	56	1996	34°24′40″N 135°18′0″E	Izumisano	5th-tallest building in Japan
4	The Kitahama		209 (687)	54	2009	34°41′21″N 135°30′25.5″E	Chūō-ku, Osaka	Tallest all-residential building in Japan; 22nd-tallest building in Japan; Tallest building completed in Osaka in the 2000s
5=	Osaka Bay Tower		200 (657)	51	1993	34°40′9″N 135°27′40″E	Minato-ku, Osaka	28th-tallest building in Japan
5=	X-Tower Osaka Bay		200 (657)	54	2006	34°40′6.5″N 135°27′37″E	Minato-ku, Osaka	28th-tallest building in Japan
—	Nanko Power Plant^{[A]}	—	200 (657)			—	Suminoe-ku, Osaka	—
5=	Nakanoshima Festival Tower West		200 (657)	41	2017	34°41′36.7″N 135°29′43.5″E	Kita-ku, Osaka	
5=	Nakanoshima Festival Tower		200 (657)	39	2012	34°41′36.7″N 135°29′48.3″E	Kita-ku, Osaka	
9	KEPCO Headquarters		196 (641)	41	2004	34°41′34″N 135°29′33.5″E	Kita-ku, Osaka	33rd-tallest building in Japan
10	One Dojima		195 (640)	49	2024		Kita-ku, Osaka	
11=	The Parkhouse Nakanoshima Tower		193 (633)	54	2017	34°41′19″N 135°29′7.2″E	Kita-ku, Osaka	
11=	Umeda Garden Residence		193 (633)	56	2022	34°42′5.1″N 135°30′4.9″E	Kita-ku, Osaka	
13=	HERBIS Osaka		190 (622)	40	1997	34°41′55″N 135°29′34.5″E	Kita-ku, Osaka	42nd-tallest building in Japan
13=	Osaka Hibikino Machi - The Sanctus Tower		190 (622)	53	2015	34°40′43″N 135°29′40.5″E	Nishi-ku, Osaka	
13=	Osaka Umeda Twin Towers South		190 (622)	38	2022	—	Kita-ku, Osaka	
16	JP Tower Osaka		188 (616)	40	2024		Kita-ku, Osaka	
17	Osaka Umeda Twin Towers North		187 (614)	41	2010	34°42′9″N 135°29′56″E	Kita-ku, Osaka	47th-tallest building in Japan
18	Grand Green Osaka South Complex		182 (595)	39	2024	34°42′8.30″N 135°29′29.37″E	Kita-ku, Osaka	
19	Grand Front Osaka Tower A		180 (589)	38	2013	34°42′15.6″N 135°29′41″E	Kita-ku, Osaka	
20	Grand Maison Shin Umeda Tower The Club Residence		178 (584)	51	2021	34°42′7.76″N 135°29′11″E	Kita-ku, Osaka	
21=	City Tower Nishi-Umeda		177 (582)	50	2007	34°42′0″N 135°29′8.5″E	Fukushima-ku, Osaka	
21=	The Tower Osaka		177 (582)	50	2008	34°41′40″N 135°29′20.5″E	Fukushima-ku, Osaka	
23	OAP Tower		176 (578)	39	1994	34°41′39.5″N 135°31′11.5″E	Kita-ku, Osaka	
24=	Breezé Tower		175 (575)	34	2008	34°41′55″N 135°29′38″E	Kita-ku, Osaka	
24=	Grand Front Osaka South Tower B		175 (575)	38	2013	34°42′19.6″N 135°29′40″E	Kita-ku, Osaka	
26	Grand Front Osaka Owner's Tower		174 (572)	48	2013	34°42′26″N 135°29′38.6″E	Kita-ku, Osaka	
27	Umeda Sky Building		173 (568)	40	1993	34°42′19″N 135°29′23″E	Kita-ku, Osaka	
28	City Tower Osaka Honmachi		171 (560)	48	2022		Chūō-ku, Osaka	
29	City Tower Osaka		170 (558)	50	2003	34°41′11″N 135°30′27″E	Chūō-ku, Osaka	
30	Branz Tower Umeda North		168 (551)	50	2019	34°40′39.2″N 135°29′50.3″E	Kita-ku, Osaka	
31	ORC 200 Prio Tower		167 (549)	50	1992	34°40′10.7″N 135°27′34.7″E	Minato-ku, Osaka	
32	Cielia Tower Osaka Horie		165 (540)	46	2024	34°40′14.74″N 135°29′13.99″E	Nishi-ku, Osaka	Topped out; Construction is expected to last until August 2024
33	The Senri Tower		164 (539)	50	2009	34°48′40″N 135°29′40″E	Toyonaka	
34	City Tower Grand Tennoji		162 (531)	43	2007	34°38′37.5″N 135°31′3″E	Abeno-ku, Osaka	
35=	Applause Tower		161 (529)	34	1992	34°42′31″N 135°29′54.5″E	Kita-ku, Osaka	
35=	Osaka Fukushima Tower		161 (529)	45	2011	34°41′35″N 135°28′52″E	Fukushima-ku, Osaka	
37	Nakanoshima Dai Building		160 (525)	35	2009	34°41′34″N 135°29′33.5″E	Kita-ku, Osaka	
38=	Twin 21 MID Tower		157 (515)	38	1986	34°41′34″N 135°31′53.7″E	Chūō-ku, Osaka	
38=	Twin 21 Panasonic Tower		157 (515)	38	1986	34°41′36″N 135°31′51″E	Chūō-ku, Osaka	
38=	OBP Castle Tower		157 (515)	38	1988	34°41′30″N 135°31′58″E	Chūō-ku, Osaka	
38=	Crystal Tower		157 (515)	37	1990	34°41′31.7″N 135°31′43.5″E	Chūō-ku, Osaka	
42=	Meiji-Yasuda Seimei Umeda Building		156 (511)	30	2000	34°41′55″N 135°29′29.5″E	Kita-ku, Osaka	
42=	City Tower Osaka Temma The River & Parks		156 (511)	45	2009	34°42′29″N 135°30′58.5″E	Kita-ku, Osaka	
42=	Geo Tower Tenroku		156 (511)	44	2013	34°42′40.5″N 135°30′41.5″E	Kita-ku, Osaka	
45	The Namba Tower		155 (509)	46	2007	34°39′38.5″N 135°30′4.3″E	Naniwa-ku, Osaka	
46	Grand Front Osaka North Tower C		154 (505)	33	2013	34°42′23.6″N 135°29′40″E	Kita-ku, Osaka	
47	Laurel Tower Sakaisuji Honmachi		153 (501)	44	2024		Chūō-ku, Osaka	
48=	Osaka Metropolis Tower		152 (499)	46	2016	34°40′54.6″N 135°29′2.2″E	Nishi-ku, Osaka	
48=	Yodoyabashi Apple Tower Residence		152 (499)	46	2007	34°41′22″N 135°30′12″E	Chūō-ku, Osaka	
48=	The Fine Tower Umeda Toyosaki		152 (499)	45	2019	34°42′36.4″N 135°29′48″E	Kita-ku, Osaka	
51=	D'Grafort Osaka N.Y. Tower Higobashi		151 (494)	46	2008	34°41′23.6″N 135°29′49.2″E	Nishi-ku, Osaka	
51=	The Fine Tower Otemae		151 (494)	42	2021	34°41′13.8″N 135°31′0.71″E	Chūō-ku, Osaka	
53=	Yodobashi Umeda Tower		150 (492)	34	2019	34°42′17.8″N 135°29′45.5″E	Kita-ku, Osaka	
53=	Ōsaka Station North Gate Building		150 (492)	29	2011	34°42′9.5″N 135°29′39.3″E	Kita-ku, Osaka	

= Indicates buildings that have the same rank because they have the same height.

== Under construction ==
This lists buildings that are under construction in Osaka and are planned to rise at least 150 metres (490 ft). Any buildings that have been topped out but are not completed are also included.

Name	Height m (ft)	Floors	Year	City/Ward	Notes
Grand Green Osaka The South Residence	184 (604)	47	2028	Kita	
Grand Green Osaka The North Residence	173 (566)	46	2026	Kita	A 124-metre-tall (407-foot) North Rental Building is located just south of it, completing the northern section of Grand Green Osaka
Cielia Tower Nakanoshima	168 (551)	46	2026	Fukushima	
Park Tower Osaka Dojimahama	162 (531)	40	2027	Kita	

== Timeline of tallest buildings ==
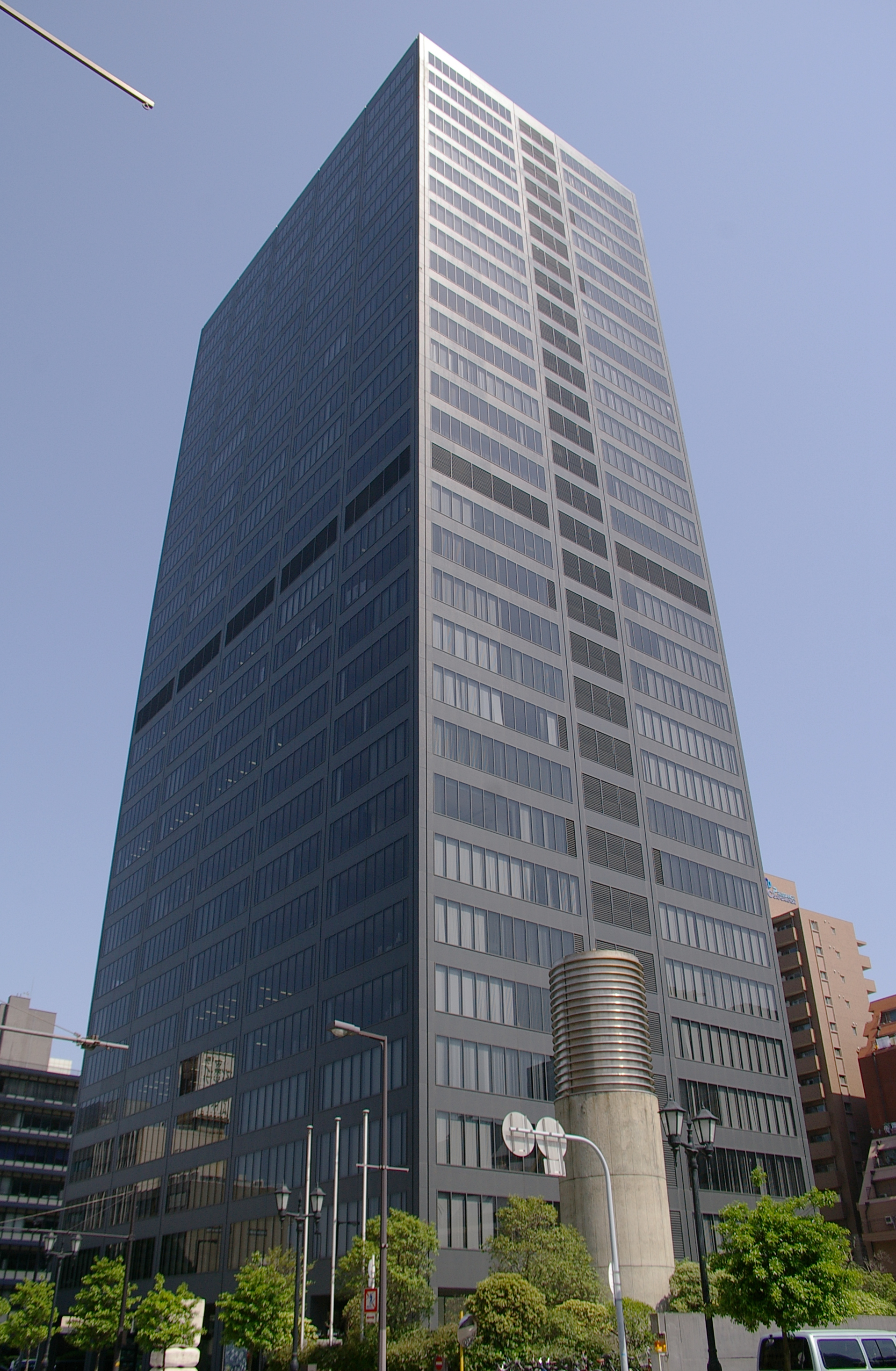
Osaka Obayashi Building

This is a list of buildings that once held the title of tallest building in Osaka.

Name	Years as tallest	Height m (ft)	Floors	Ward	Notes
Osaka Obayashi Building	1973–1973	120 (393)	30	Chūō	
Osaka Kokusai Building	1973–1977	125 (410)	32	Chūō	
Hankyu Grand Building	1977–1979	127 (417)	32	Kita	
Osaka-Ekimae Daisan Building	1979–1986	132 (432)	34	Kita	
Twin 21 Towers	1986–1992	157 (515)	38	Chūō	
OBP Castle Tower	1986–1992	157 (515)	38	Chūō	
ORC 200 Prio Tower	1992–1993	167 (548)	50	Minato	
Osaka Bay Tower	1993–1995	200 (656)	51	Minato	
Osaka Prefectural Government Sakishima Building	1995–2014	256 (840)	55	Suminoe	
Abeno Harukas	2014–present	300 (984)	60	Abeno	

== Tallest structures ==
This list ranks Osaka structures that stand at least 150 meters (490 feet) tall, based on standard height measurement. This height includes spires, architectural details and antenna masts.

Rank	Name	Image	Height m (ft)	Floors	Year	Coordinates	Structure type	Ward	Notes
1	Nanko Power Plant		200 (656)			34°36′58.2″N 135°24′16.8″E	chimney	Suminoe	
2	Tanagawa No.2 Power Plant		200 (656)		1977	34°19′23.5″N 135°7′47.7″E	chimney	Misaki	
3	Dai Heiwa Kinen Tō		180 (591)		1970	34°30′6.8″N 135°35′9.6″E	cenotaph	Tondabayashi	
4	Tempozan Bridge		152 (499)		1990	34°39′30″N 135°26′2″E	cable-stayed bridge	Minato	

=== Demolished or destroyed structures ===
Name	Image	Height m (ft)	Year built	Year destroyed	Structure type	Location	Notes
Osaka Tower		160 (525)	1966	2009	radio tower	Kita	Dismantled

== See also ==
- List of tallest structures in Japan

== Notes ==
A. This structure is not a habitable building but is included in this list for comparative purposes. Per a ruling by the Council on Tall Buildings and Urban Habitat, freestanding observation towers, chimneys or masts are not considered to be buildings, as they are not fully habitable structures.
