= Osaka Prefectural Government Sakishima Building =

Skyscraper in Osaka, Japan

- 大阪府咲洲庁舎
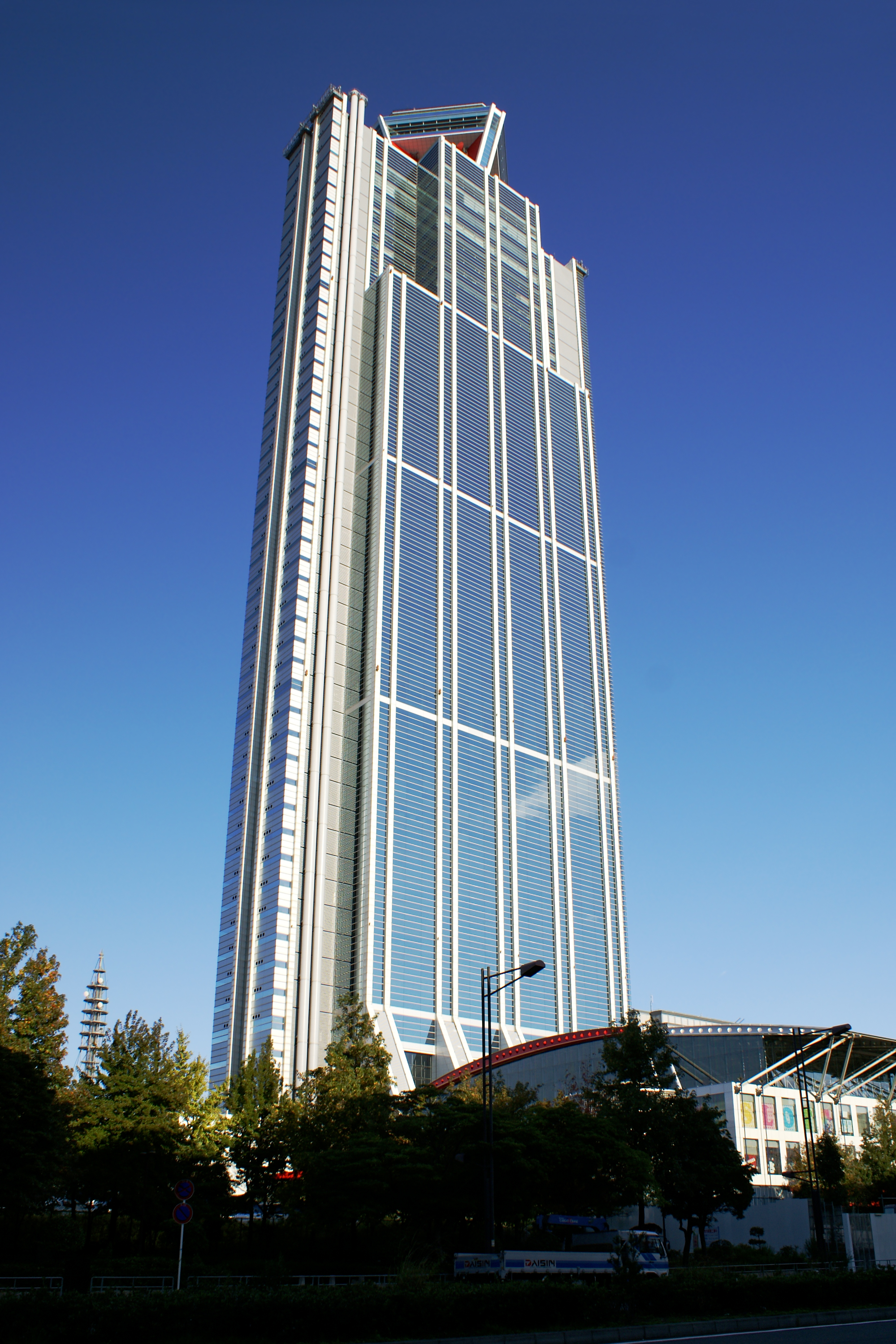

General information
- Status: Completed
- Type: Mixed-use
- Location: Osaka, Japan
- Coordinates: 34°38′18″N 135°24′54″E
- Completed: 1995

Height
- Architectural: 256 m (840 ft)

Technical details
- Floor count: 55 above ground 3 below ground
- Lifts/elevators: 32 (12 by Toshiba Elevator・Hitachi, 6 by Mitsubishi Electric, 2 by Otis)

The Osaka Prefectural Government Sakishima Building (大阪府咲洲庁舎, Ōsaka fu Sakishima chōsha) or Cosmo Tower (コスモタワー, Kosumo Tawā) is the third tallest building in Osaka and the sixth tallest building in Japan. Until 2023, it was known as Osaka World Trade Center Building (大阪ワールドトレードセンタービルディング, Ōsaka Wārudo Torēdo Sentā Birudingu) or WTC Cosmo Tower (WTCコスモタワー, Daburyūtīshī Kosumo Tawā). It is located in Nanko Cosmo Square, near the Osaka harbor, in Suminoe-ku.

The skyscraper rises 256 m (840 ft), the same height as the Rinku Gate Tower Building in Izumisano. It contains three basement floors, a museum, restaurants, office space, a conference room, a skylobby and an observation deck, which is located in an inverted pyramid at the top of the structure. The building houses the working office for the governor of Osaka Prefecture.

== See also ==
- List of tallest structures in Osaka Prefecture
- List of tallest structures in Japan

Records
Preceded by ORC 200	Tallest building in Osaka; 252 m (827 ft); 1995–2014	Succeeded by Abeno Harukas
