= The Parkhouse Nishi-Shinjuku Tower 60 =

- ザ・パークハウス 西新宿タワー60
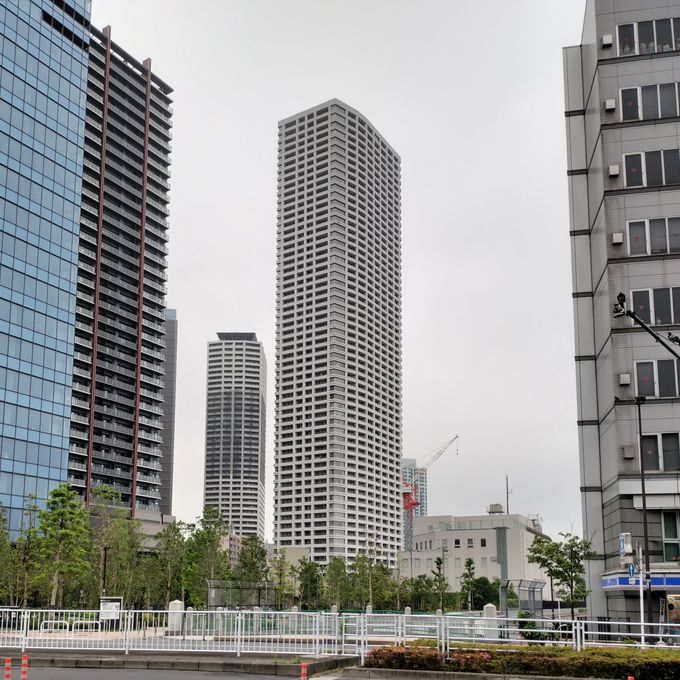

General information
- Status: Completed
- Type: Residential
- Location: Nishi-Shinjuku, Shinjuku, Tokyo, Japan, 5-5-1 Nishi-Shinjuku, Shinjuku, Tokyo

Height
- Roof: 209 m (686 ft)

Technical details
- Floor count: 60 (+2 underground)

Design and construction
- Main contractor: Fujita Corporation

The Parkhouse Nishi-Shinjuku Tower 60 (ザ・パークハウス 西新宿タワー60, Za Pākuhausu Nishi-Shinjuku Tawā 60) is a residential skyscraper located in Nishi-Shinjuku, Shinjuku, Tokyo, Japan.

Built between 2014 and 2017, the tower stands at 209 m (686 ft) tall.

== Overview ==
The development was carried out as part of the Nishi-Shinjuku 5-chome Central North District Urban Redevelopment Project, which aimed to replace densely concentrated wooden housing with fire-resistant buildings. The project was developed by three companies: Mitsubishi Estate Residence, Sotetsu Real Estate, and Marubeni.

It is the westernmost development in the Nishi-Shinjuku skyscraper district. Following this project, redevelopment projects have also been undertaken in the adjacent North District and Central South District. Upon their completion, four skyscrapers are expected to line 5-chome.

The redevelopment also included the construction of Shinjuku City Yodobashi Keyakibashi Park and other public open spaces. A monument commemorating the former Keyakibashi-dori Shopping Street, which disappeared as a result of the redevelopment, was erected in one of these open spaces.

At 60 floors, the building ranks second in Japan by floor count among residential buildings as of 2026. When completed, it was the second-tallest residential building in Japan, after The Kitahama in Osaka, Osaka Prefecture. As of 2026, it ranks fifth nationally by height.

== Gallery ==
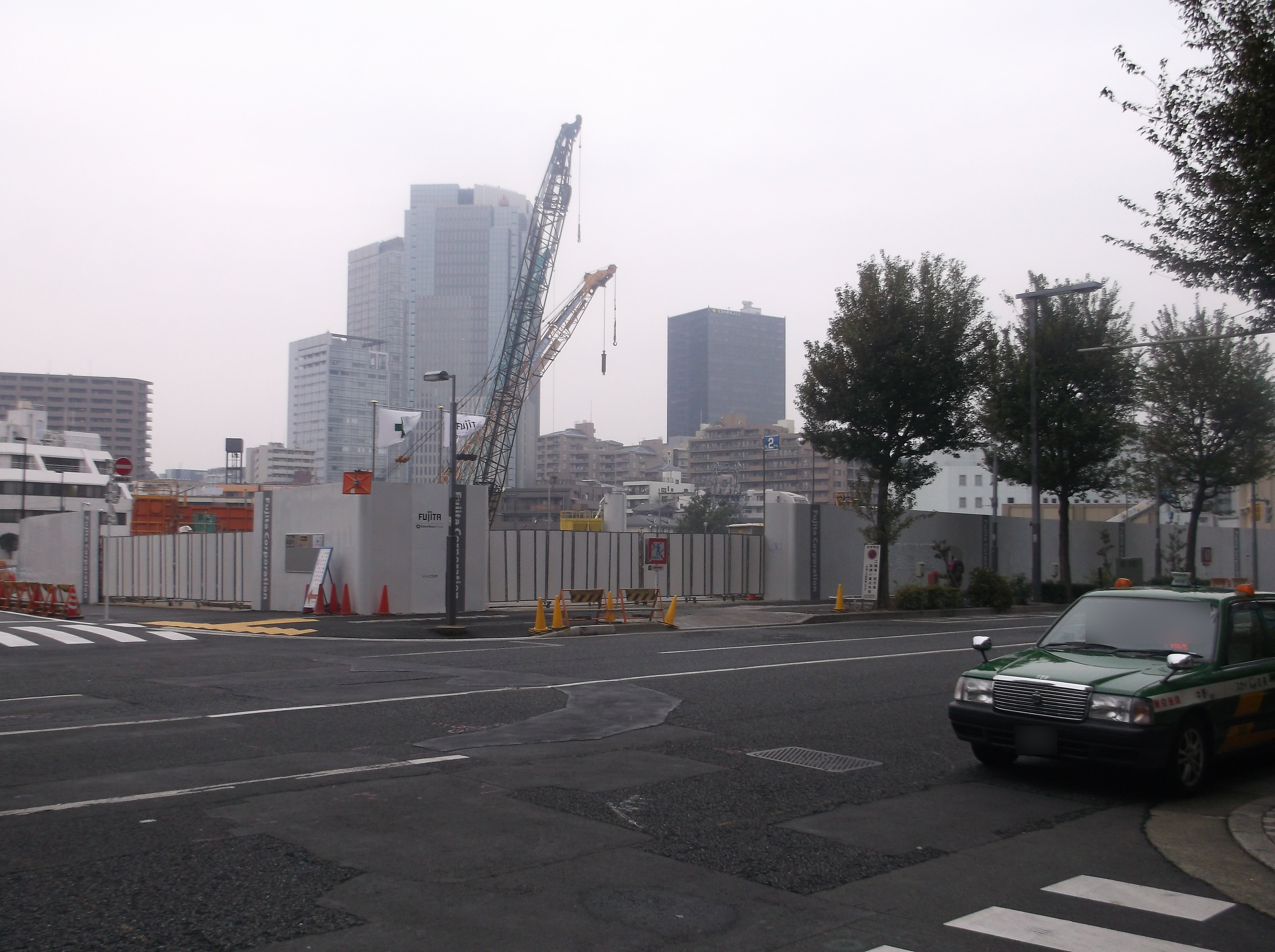
Under construction (November 2014), with the buildings of Nakano-sakaue in the background

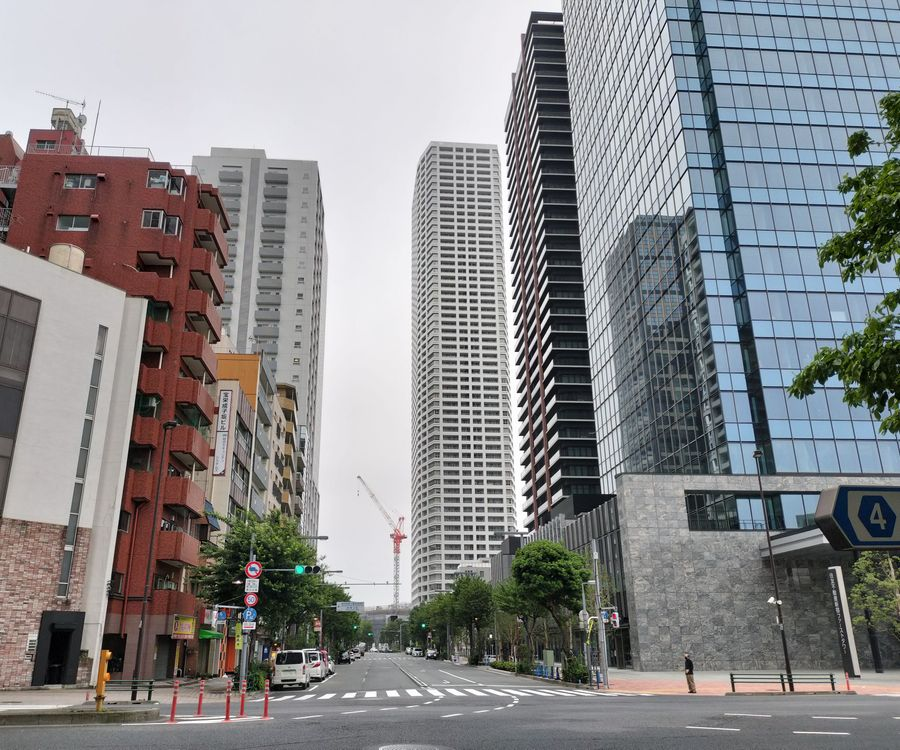
View from Narukozakashita intersection (June 2023)

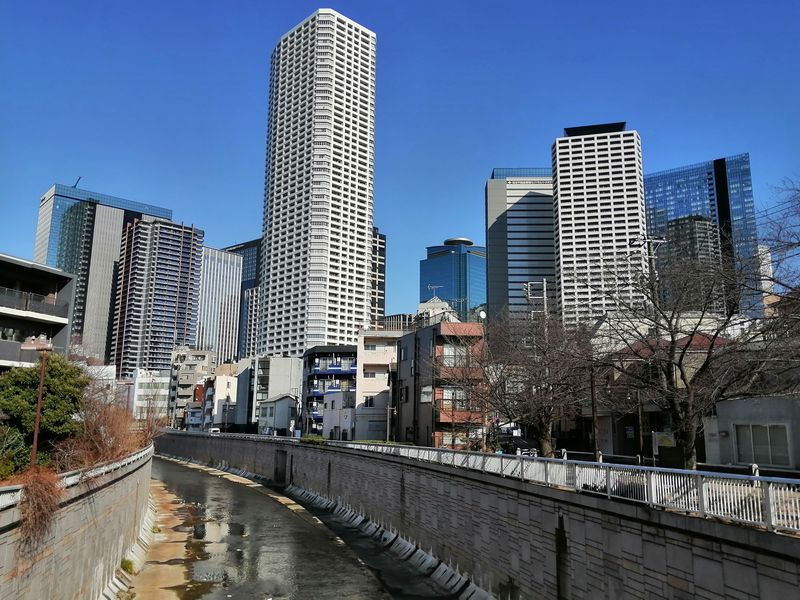
View from Ayame Bridge over the Kanda River (February 2023)

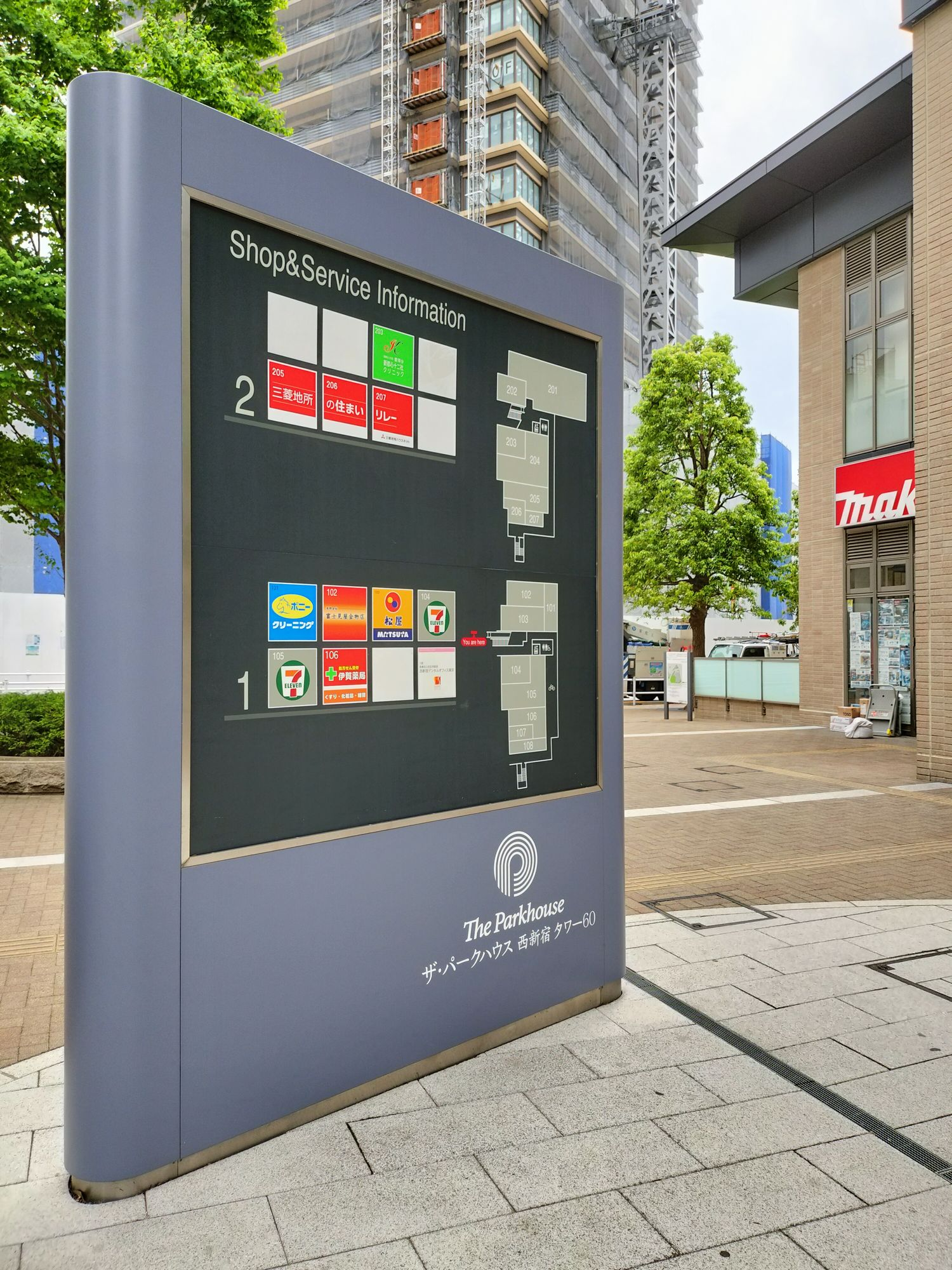
Directory of shops on the first and second floors

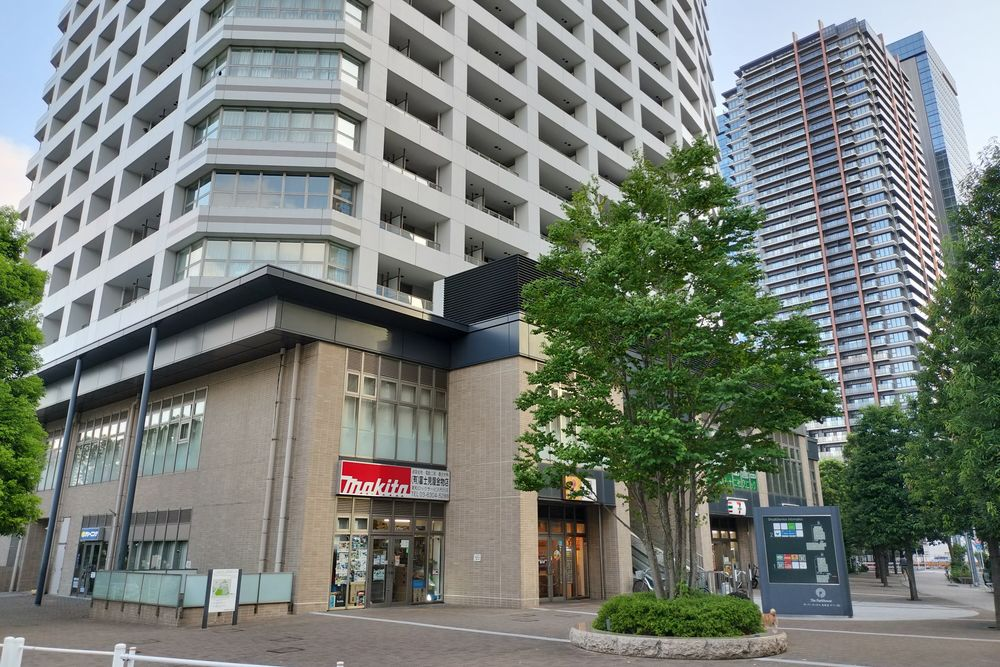
Lower floors

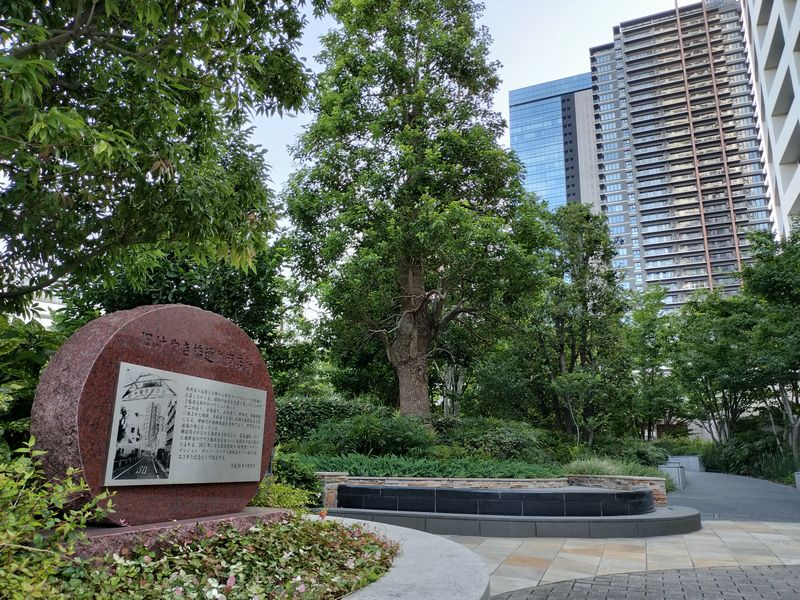
Public open space on the west side, with a monument to the former Keyakibashi-dori Shopping Street
