= King Mansion Dōjimagawa =

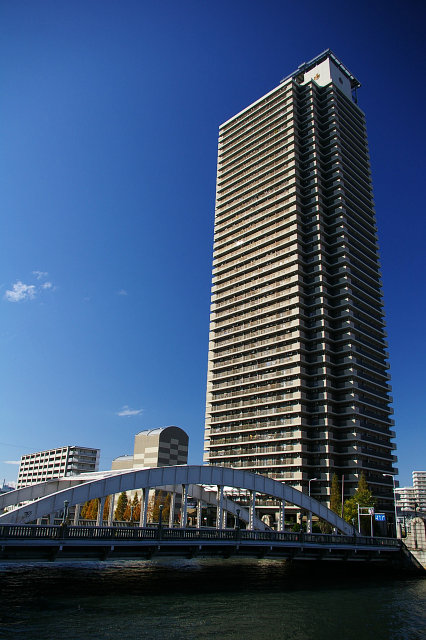
- Interactive map of the King Mansion Dōjimagawa area

General information
- Status: Completed
- Type: apartment house
- Location: 1-1-36 Tamagawa, Fukushima-ku, Osaka, Japan
- Coordinates: 34.6897°N 135.484°E
- Completed: June 1998

Height
- Roof: 142 m (466 ft)

Technical details
- Floor count: B1F to 43F
- Floor area: 41,050 m^{2} (441,900 sq ft)

Design and construction
- Architect: Taisei Corporation
- Developer: Hanshin Juken
- Main contractor: Taisei Corporation

King Mansion Dōjimagawa (キングマンション堂島川) is a high rise apartment building, situated at 1-1-36 Tamagawa, Fukushima-ku, Osaka, Japan.

This building was once highest in Fukushima ward, when constructed on 1998. Also is face to Dōjima River and Dōjima Ōhashi bridge.

== Access ==
Nakanoshima Station on the Keihan Nakanoshima Line is next to the building.

== See also ==
- Osaka
- Nakanoshima
- Shimo-fukushima Park : public park and sports centre next to this building
