= Rinku Town =

Development in Izumisano, Osaka, Japan

Coordinates: 34.41231°N 135.30017°E

Rinku Town (りんくうタウン, Rinkū Taun) is a commercial development in Izumisano, Osaka, Japan, adjacent to Kansai International Airport. It was constructed in the early 1990s on reclaimed land, and opened in September 1995.

Rinku Town is accessible from Osaka by the Nankai Main Line and JR Hanwa Line. With the exception of Kansai Airport Limited Express Haruka services, all train services to and from Kansai International Airport stop at Rinkū Town Station.

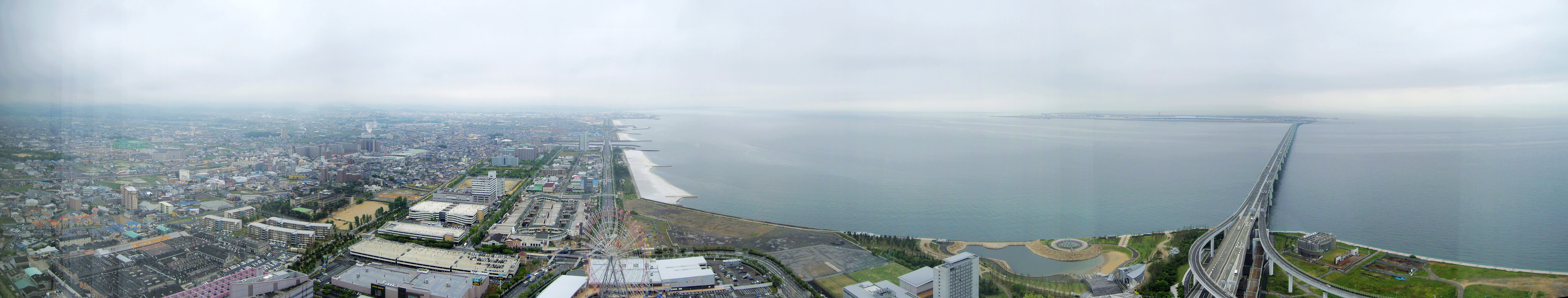
Rinku Town and Kansai International Airport

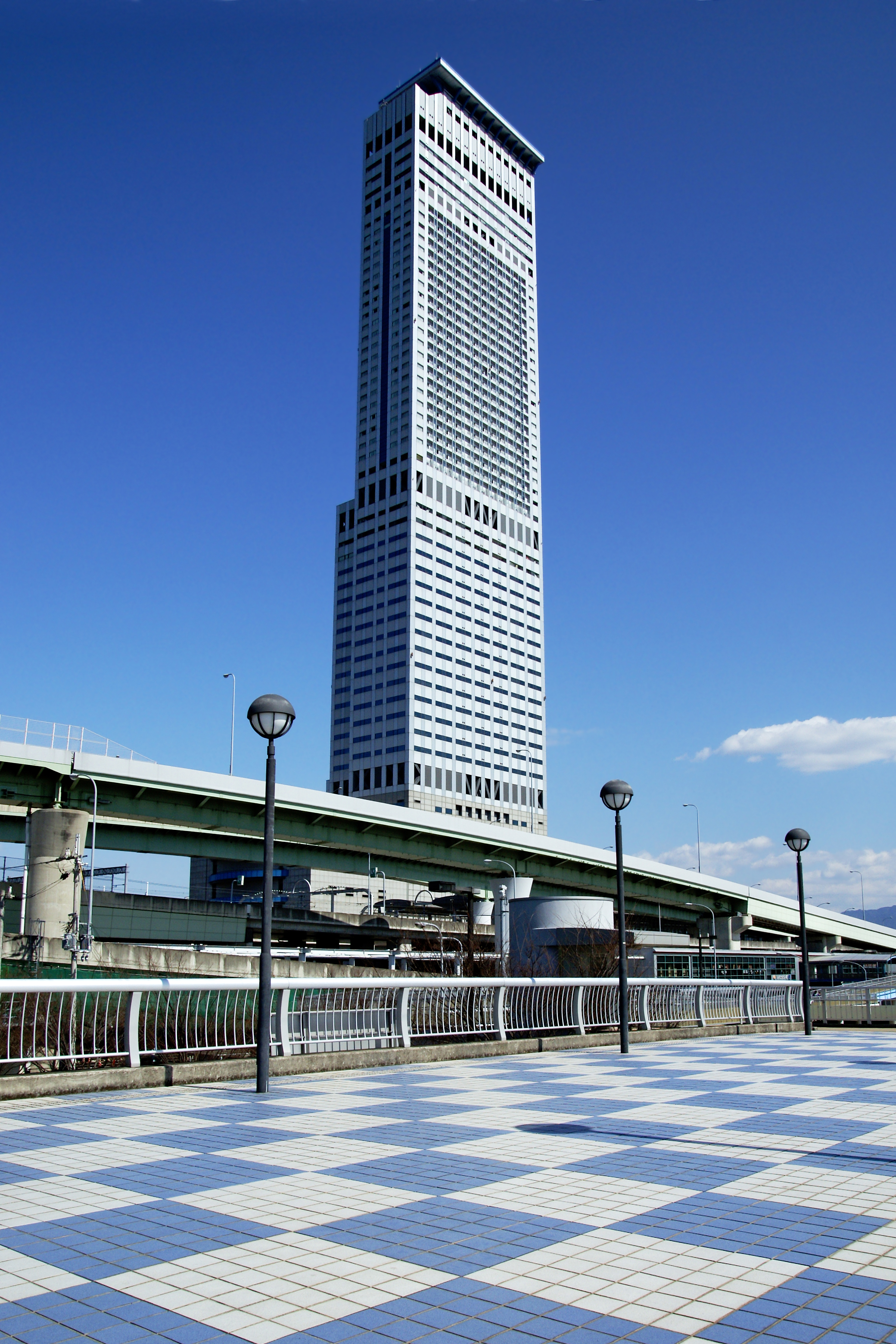
Rinku Gate Tower Building

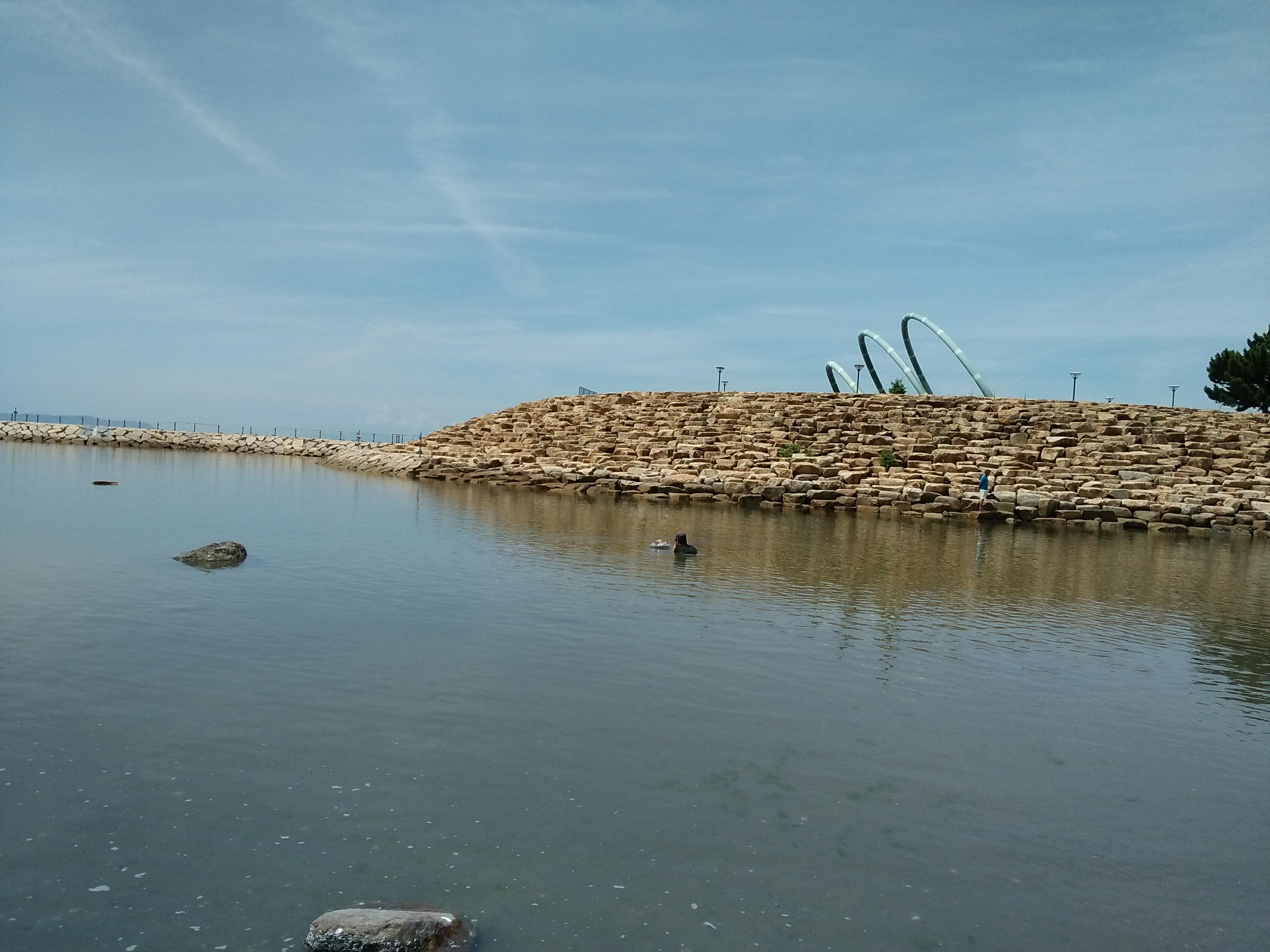
Rinku town beach

== Landmarks ==
- Rinku Gate Tower Building - third-tallest building in Japan (after the Abeno Harukas, Yokohama Landmark Tower)
- Rinku Premium Outlets shopping mall
- Rinku Pleasure Town Seacle commercial facility
  - Big Ferris wheel - 280 feet high
- Marble Beach - Beach filled with white marble stones
- Tajiri Sky Bridge - Cable-stayed bridge
- Japan Foundation Japanese Language Institute Kansai
