= OAP =

OAP may refer to:

- OAP Tower, or Osaka Amenity Park Tower, a plaza and office development in Japan
- Old-age pensioner, a person who has retired, and now collects a pension, commonly referred to as an OAP in the United Kingdom
- One Australia policy, a proposal in the 1980s to limit Asian immigration to Australia
- Open access (publishing), a type of academic publication accessible by all, without subscription
- Offset Alpine Printing
- Off-axis parabolic reflector, a type of curved mirror used in optics and radio
- the Office of Atoms for Peace of Thailand
- Indonesian Papuans (Orang Asli Papua in Indonesian)
