= Panasonic Tower =

Panasonic Tower may refer to:

- Tower Hotel (Niagara Falls)
- Panasonic Tower (Kuwait City) (2009), one of the tallest buildings in Kuwait
- Panasonic Tower, one of the tallest buildings in Osaka Prefecture
