= Himejima Station =

Railway station in Osaka, Japan

Himejima Station 姫島駅
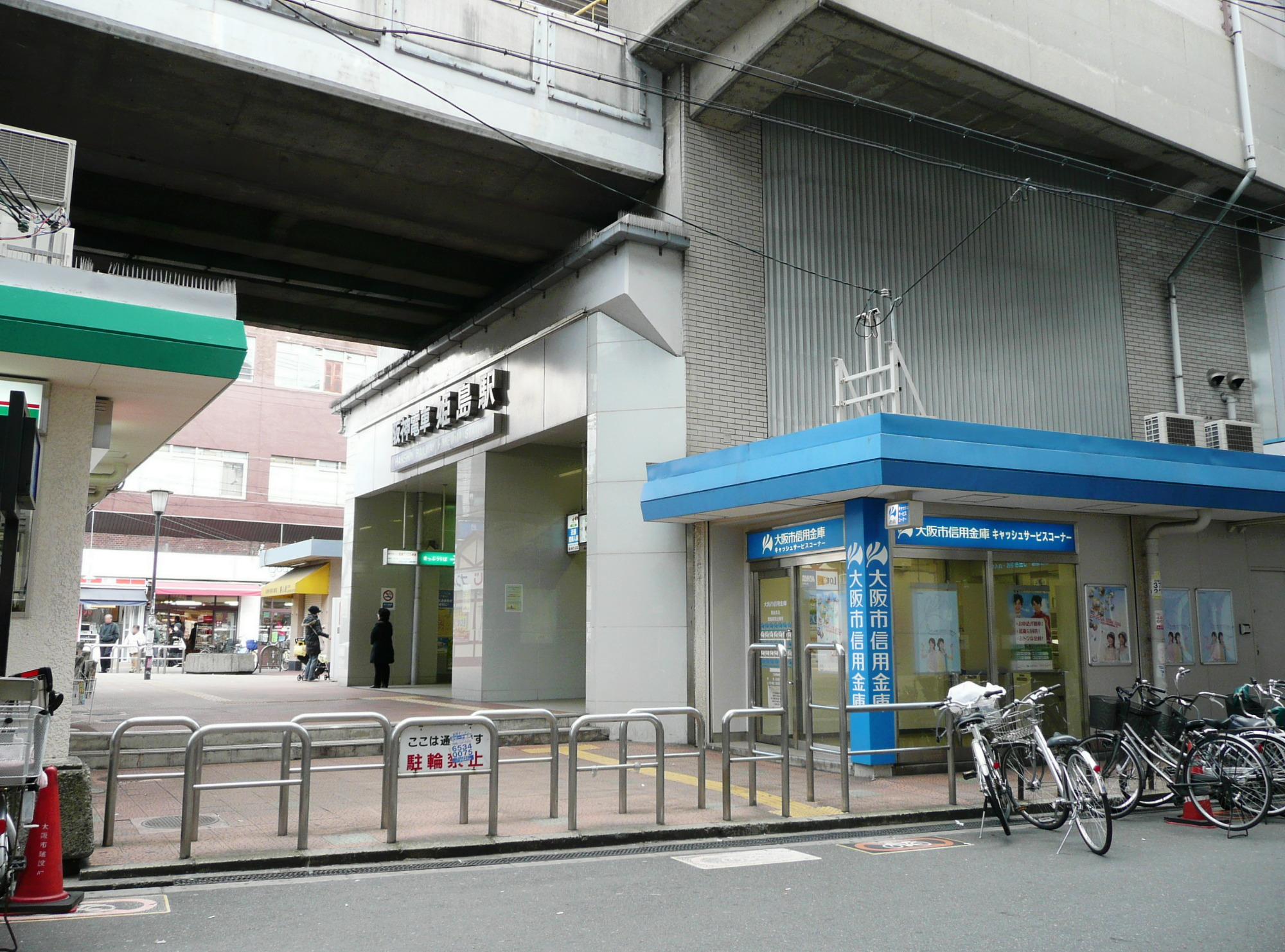
- Himejima Station

General information
- Location: 26, Himejima 1-chome, Nishiyodogawa, Osaka, Osaka （大阪市西淀川区姫島一丁目） Japan
- Coordinates: 34°42′16″N 135°27′30″E
- Operator: Hanshin Electric Railway
- Line: Main Line
- Connections: Bus stop

History
- Opened: 1905
- Former names: Hiejima (until 1925)
Location

Himejima Station (姫島駅, Himejima-eki) is a railway station in Nishiyodogawa-ku, Osaka Prefecture, Japan.

== Lines ==
- Hanshin Electric Railway
  - Main Line

== Layout ==
■ Main Line	for Umeda
■ Main Line	for Amagasaki, Koshien, Sannomiya, and Kosoku Kobe

== Adjacent stations ==
«	Service	»
Hanshin Electric Railway
Main Line
Yodogawa	Local	Chibune
Morning Express: Does not stop at this station
Express: Does not stop at this station
Morning Limited Express for Umeda: Does not stop at this station
Limited Express; Through Limited Express: Does not stop at this station
