= Yodogawa Station =

Railway station in Osaka, Japan

Yodogawa Station 淀川駅
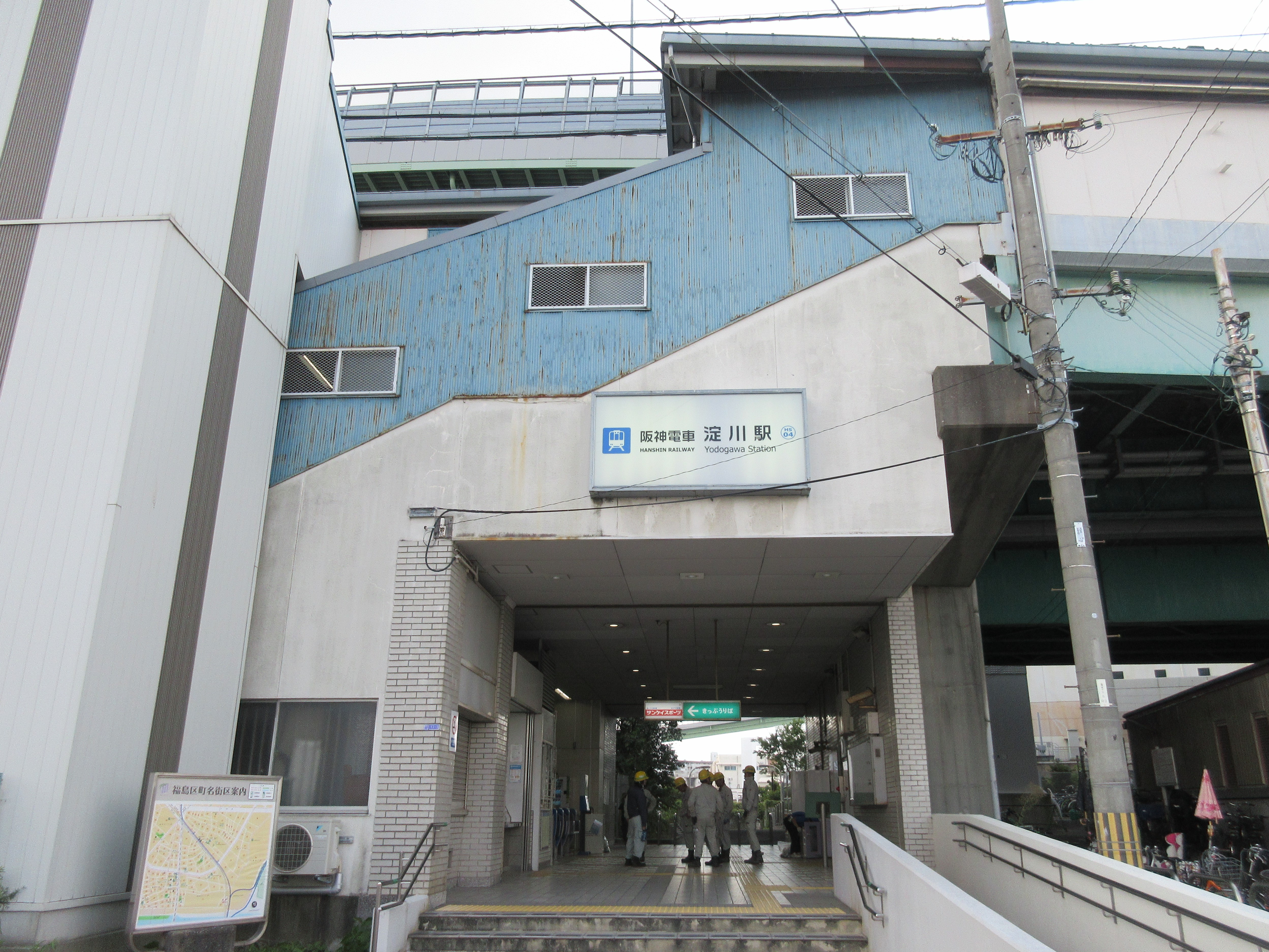
- Yodogawa Station

General information
- Location: 17, Ebie 8-chome, Fukushima, Osaka, Osaka （大阪市福島区海老江八丁目17） Japan
- Coordinates: 34°41′47″N 135°27′54″E
- Operator: Hanshin Electric Railway
- Line: Main Line
- Connections

History
- Opened: 1905

Passengers
- 4,919 daily
Location

Yodogawa Station (淀川駅, Yodogawa-eki) is a railway station in Fukushima-ku, Osaka Prefecture, Japan.

== Lines ==
- Hanshin Electric Railway
  - Main Line

== Layout ==
■ Main Line	for Umeda
■ Main Line	for Amagasaki, Koshien, Kobe (Sannomiya), Akashi, and Himeji

== Adjacent stations ==
«	Service	»
Hanshin Electric Railway
Main Line
Noda	Local	Himejima
Morning Express: Does not stop at this station
Express: Does not stop at this station
Morning Limited Express for Umeda: Does not stop at this station
Limited Express; Through Limited Express: Does not stop at this station
