= The Tower Osaka =

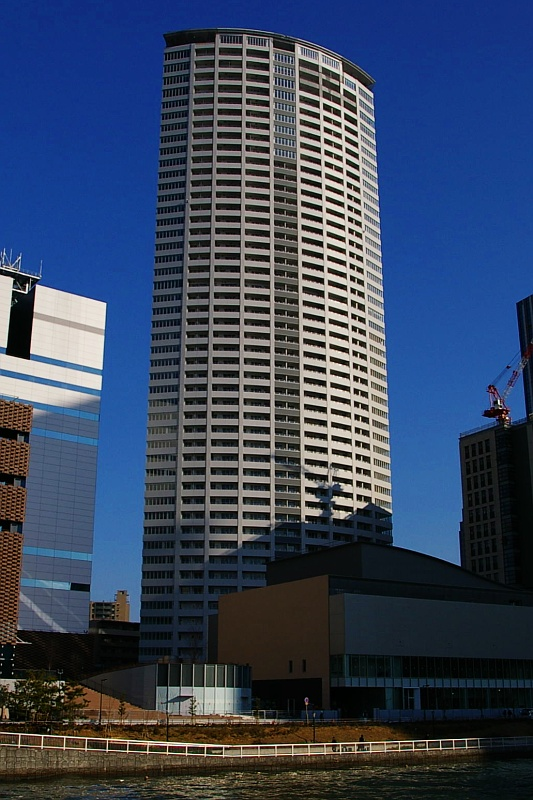

General information
- Status: Completed
- Type: apartment house
- Location: Fukushima-ku, Osaka
- Coordinates: 34.694423°N 135.48905°E
- Completed: April 2008
- Opening: June 2008

Height
- Roof: 177 m (581 ft)

Technical details
- Floor count: B1F to 49F
- Floor area: 73,137 m^{2} (787,240 sq ft)

Design and construction
- Architect: Takenaka Corporation
- Developer: Orix Estate, Mitsubishi Estate, Sumitomo Corporation, KEPCO Estate, Keihan Railway Estate
- Main contractor: Takenaka Corporation

The Tower Osaka is a high rise apartment building situated at Hotarumachi, 1-1 Fukushima, Fukushima-ku, Osaka, Japan. It is the highest building in Fukushima ward.

== Access ==
The nearest train stations are Nakanoshima on the Keihan Nakanoshima Line, and Fukushima on the JR Osaka Loop Line and Hanshin Main Line.

== See also ==
- Osaka
- Nakanoshima
- List of tallest buildings in Osaka
