= Shimo-fukushima Park =

Urban park in Osaka, Japan

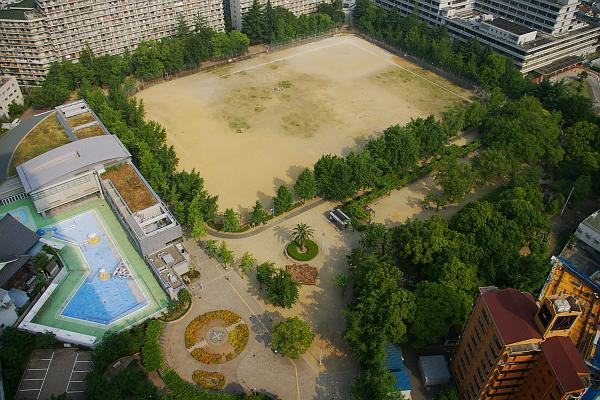
- Interactive map of Shimo-fukushima Park
- Type: Urban park
- Location: Fukushima-ku, Osaka, Japan
- Coordinates: 34.6908°N 135.4825°E
- Area: 4.1307 hectares (10.207 acres)
- Created: 1 May 1942
- Operator: Osaka city
- Status: Open all year
- Parking: Paid parking

Shimo-fukushima Park (下福島公園, Shimo-Fukushima-Kōen) is a public urban park, situated at 4 chōme Fukushima in Fukushima-ku, Osaka, Japan.

The park was constructed at the site of the former spinning factory of the Dai-Nihon Spinning Company (current company is Unitika, Ltd.), and is the largest park in Fukushima ward. In the park, spinning factory's old brick wall constructed around 1894 remains, which stopped the fire from air raids during World War II.

There is a legend that here is a cradle place of Wisteria floribunda (Japanese:Noda-Fuji), some Wisteria floribunda is cultivated even today in the park. Fuji-An garden (Japanese Fuji-An no Niwa) where Toyotomi Hideyoshi and Ashikaga Yoshiakira visited, is also restored in the park.

In 2001, the public pool and training centre were renovated and are currently operated by Konami Sports Co.Ltd.

== Facilities ==
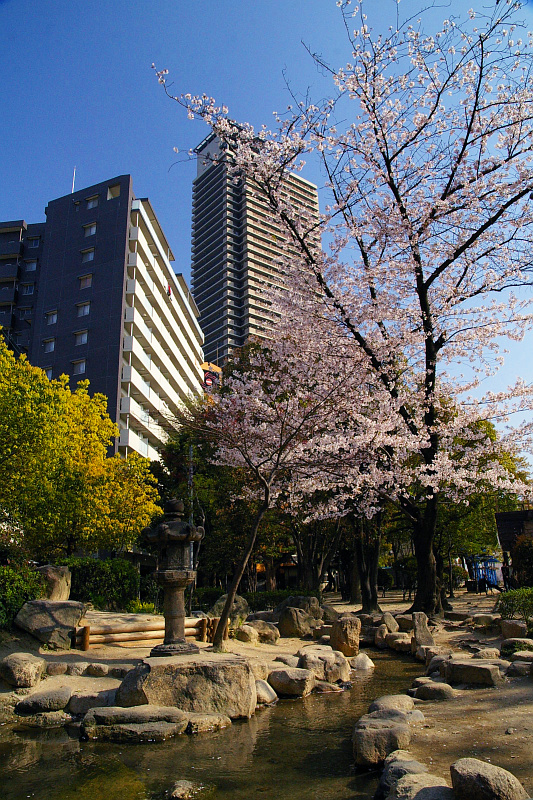
Fuji-An garden

- Public pool and training centre : admission required
- Play ground (mainly for amateur baseball) : admission required
- Fuji-An garden
- Parking lot : a fee is charged

== Activities in the park ==
- The Autumn Fukushima Ward residents' festival

== Access ==
The nearest train station is Nakanoshima on the Keihan Nakanoshima Line.

== See also ==
- Osaka
- Nakanoshima
- Utsubo Park

== Photographs ==
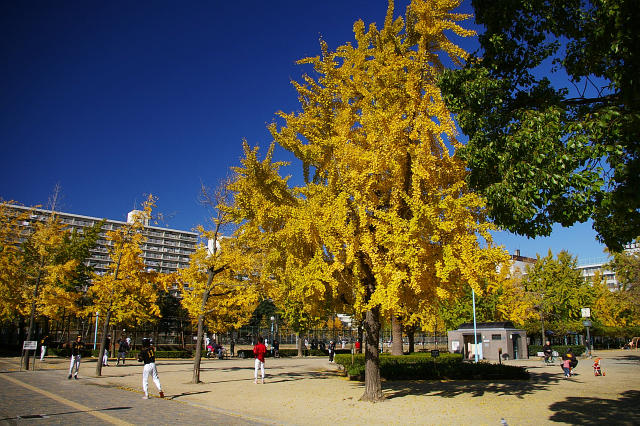
autumn

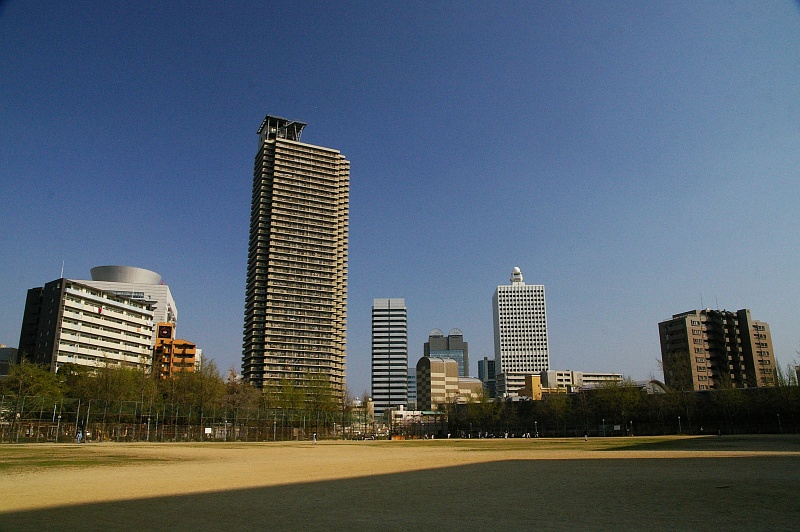
play ground
