= Rinku Gate Tower Building =

Skyscraper in Izumisano, Japan

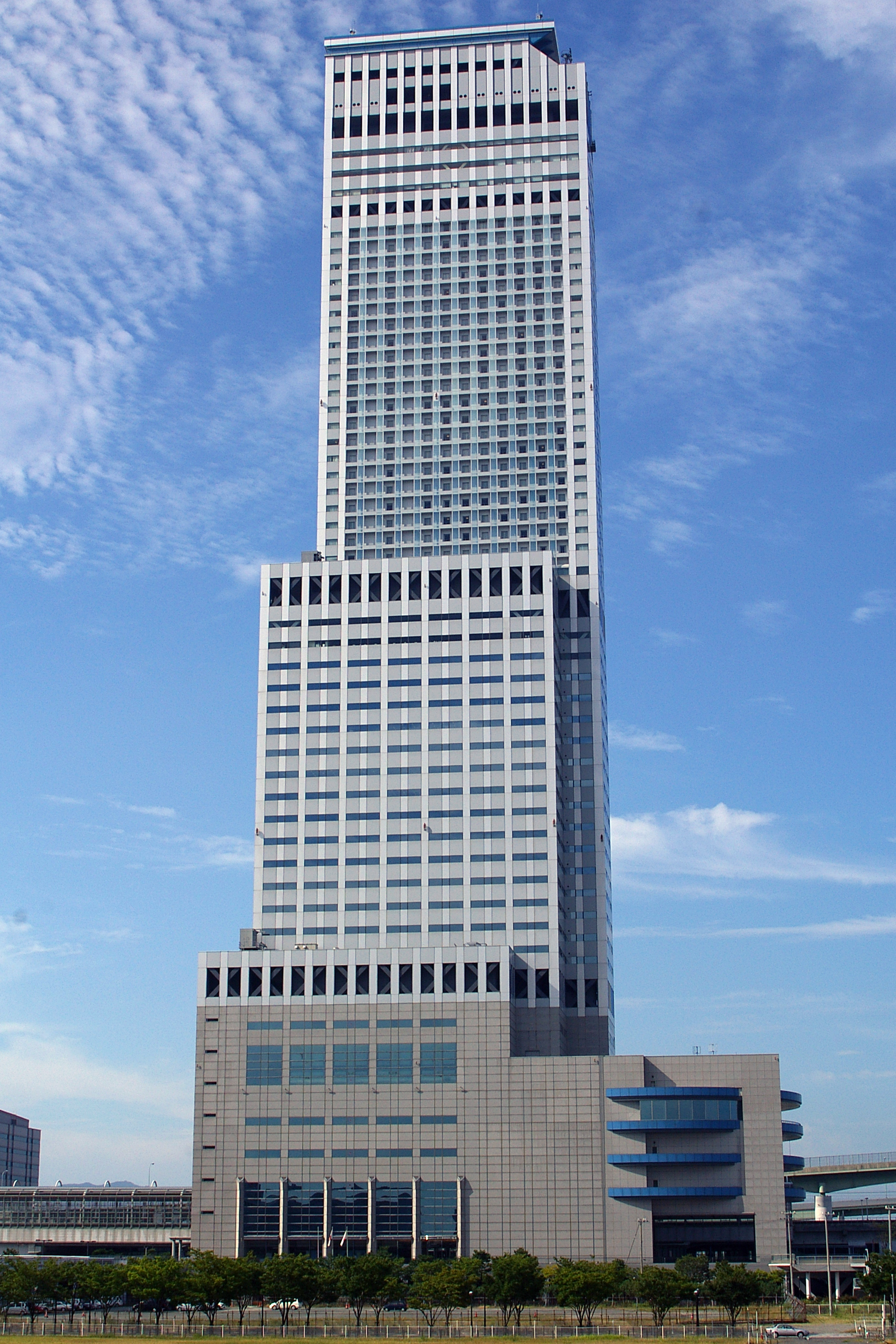
- Rinku Gate Tower Building
- Interactive map of the Rinku Gate Tower Building area

General information
- Status: Completed
- Location: Izumisano, Osaka, Japan
- Coordinates: 34°24′40″N 135°18′0″E
- Construction started: August 1992
- Opening: August 1996
- Cost: JPY 66 billion
- Owner: SiS International Holdings

Height
- Top floor: 256 m (840 ft)

Technical details
- Floor count: 56
- Floor area: 102,900 m^{2} (1,108,000 sq ft)

Design and construction
- Architects: Nikken Sekkei, Yasui Architects & Engineers

The Rinku Gate Tower Building (りんくうゲートタワービル, Rinkū Gēto Tawā Biru) is a 256-metre-tall (840-foot) skyscraper located in Rinku Town, Izumisano, Osaka, Japan. The 56-storey building was completed in August 1996, following the design of Nikken Sekkei and Yasui Architects & Engineers. It is currently the fourth-tallest building in Japan, after Azabudai Hills Mori JP Tower, Abeno Harukas and Yokohama Landmark Tower.

The tower is split into three vertical sections: the lowest section contains an international conference hall, the middle contains business offices, and the top and slimmest section is the Gate Tower Hotel. The hotel is in a convenient location for travellers, as it anchors the Sky Gate Bridge leading to the Kansai International Airport and is connected to the JR Hanwa Line and Nankai Main Line Rinkū Town Station. The 26th floor serves as an observation level which gives views of the ocean, Sky Gate Bridge, and the Ferris wheel of Rinku Town. The building has two underground floors which are used as a 365-space car park.

The building contains offices, shopping malls, retail, a department store and the Star Gate Hotel Kansai Airport hotel that occupy levels 29-54. An observation deck on the 54th floor features a 360-degree view over the airport, the Kansai Kokusai bridge, and the Rinku Carnival.

== History ==
The Rinku Gate Tower Building was conceived in the mid-1980s during the planning of Kansai International Airport. Originally, the plan was to build twin towers on the site, which would form a "gate" facing the airport. By the time construction began in 1992, the Japanese asset price bubble had collapsed and the plan to build the second tower was scrapped.

During the building's first few years of operation, its office area was largely vacant, given its distance from central Osaka and the under-utilization of the airport. In 1999, the government of Osaka Prefecture moved a number of functions into the building, including a passport office.

The building's hotel was originally part of the ANA Hotels chain as the ANA Gate Tower Hotel, and was operated by an affiliate of All Nippon Airways. The hotel operating company filed for liquidation in 2005, which caused its parent company, the building operator, to file for restructuring several months later. A group of investors led by Shinsei Bank and Kennedix purchased the building at the end of this process for ¥4.5 billion (US$41 million).

From 2005 to 2011, the ANA Gate Tower Hotel was managed by a company 90% owned by Osaka Prefecture. The company ran an operating deficit of 150 to 400 million yen per year and eventually became insolvent. Osaka governor Tōru Hashimoto pushed to privatize the hotel, and in July 2011 management was transferred to Dancin' Diner, a Kansai region restaurant chain, with the hotel being renamed "Star Gate Hotel Kansai Airport."

An affiliate of the Hong Kong-listed company SiS International Holdings purchased the building in December 2012 for 3 billion yen as its first real estate investment in Japan.

== Floors ==
- 55-56: Observatory
- 53-54: Restaurant
- 34-52: Hotel guest rooms
- 29-33: Ballrooms and hotel facilities
- 10-29: Office
- 7-9: Clinic, showroom
- 3-6: Banquet hall
- 1-2: Lobby, retail
- B2-B1: Parking

== See also ==
- List of tallest structures in Osaka Prefecture
- List of tallest structures in Japan
