= City Tower Nishi-Umeda =

Skyscraper in Osaka, Japan

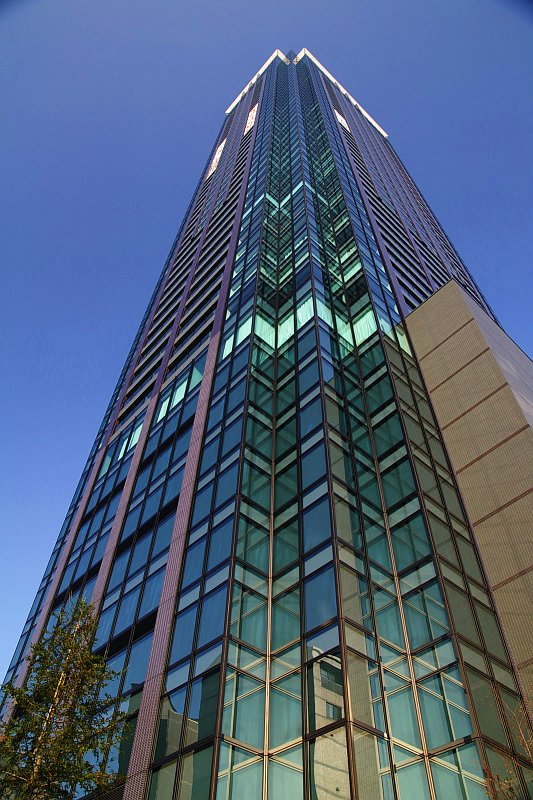

General information
- Status: Completed
- Type: apartment house
- Location: 7-20 Fukushima, Fukushima-ku, Osaka, Japan
- Coordinates: 34.700042°N 135.485646°E
- Completed: December 2006

Height
- Roof: 177.4 m (582 ft)

Technical details
- Floor count: B1F to 50F
- Floor area: 52,771 m^{2} (568,020 sq ft)

Design and construction
- Architect: Takenaka Corporation
- Developer: Sumitomo Realty & Development, Nippon Steel City Produce
- Main contractor: Takenaka Corporation

City Tower Nishi-Umeda (Japanese:シティタワー西梅田) is a high rise apartment building, situated at 7-20 Fukushima, Fukushima-ku, Osaka, Japan.

At the time of completion in 2006, it was the highest building in Fukushima ward, and the highest apartment block in the Umeda area. The glass curtain wall facade, an external wall made with glass, is a notable characteristic of this building.

== Access ==
The nearest train station is Fukushima on the JR Osaka Loop Line and Hanshin Main Line.

== See also ==
- Osaka
- List of tallest buildings in Osaka
- The Symphony Hall : neighboring concert hall
