= OAP Tower =

Plaza and office development in Japan

Coordinates: 34°42′00″N 135°31′11″E

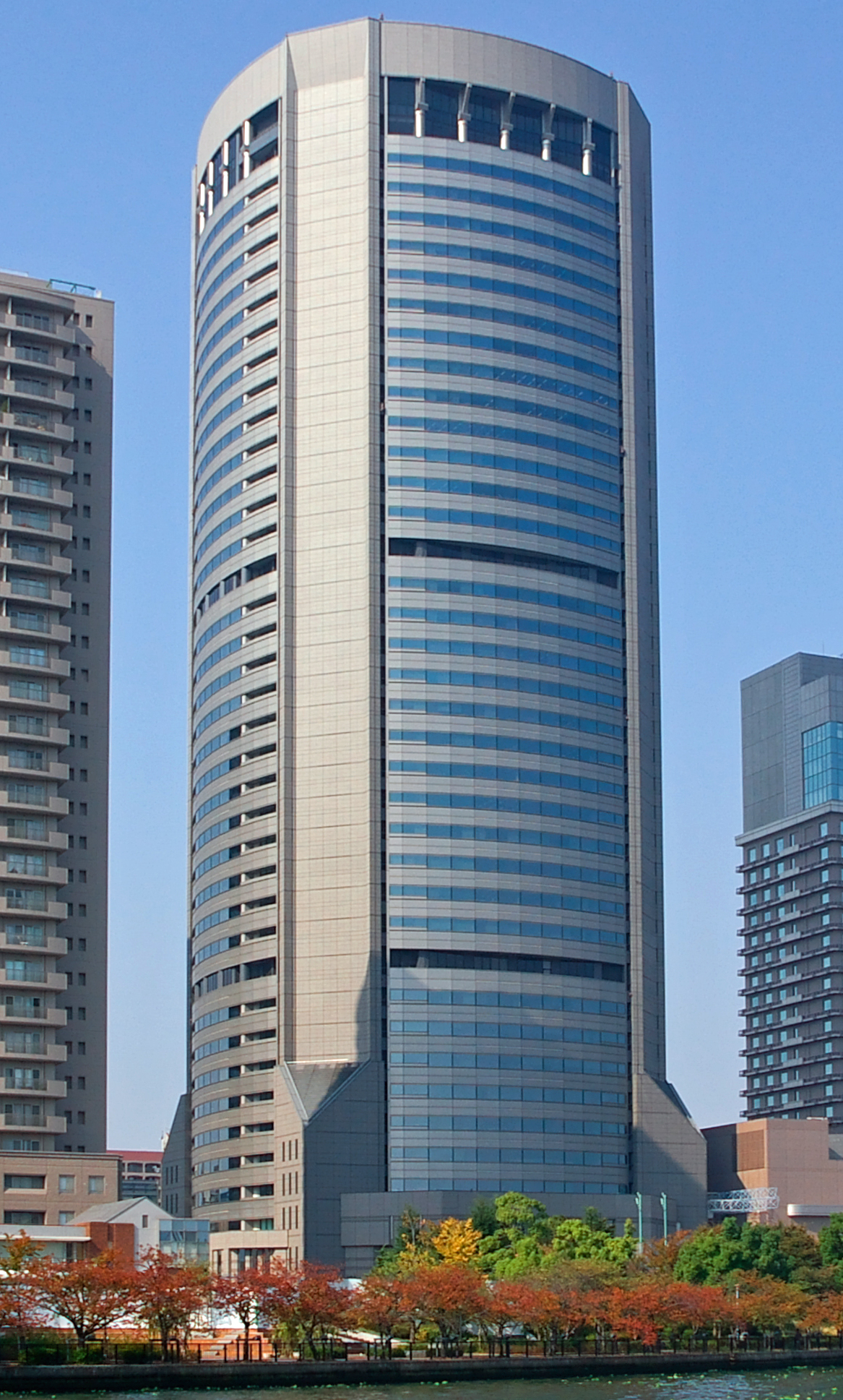
Osaka Armenity Park Tower

Osaka Amenity Park Tower is one of the largest plaza and office developments in Japan, located at the Tenmabashi District in Kita Ward, Osaka.

It was built by Mitsubishi Estates in 1994. It displays a collected line of cafes, restaurants, plazas, stores, offices and sky-view features like sky restaurants. It has a position in the List of tallest structures in Japan. It has a height of 176 meters and has 39 floors. OAP Tower is also integrated with the two OAP Residence Towers and the Teikoku Hotel.

== See also ==
- List of tallest buildings in Osaka
- List of tallest structures in Japan
