= Fukushima-ku =

Ward of Osaka, Japan

Coordinates: 34°41′32.48″N 135°28′20.03″E

Location of Fukushima-ku in Osaka City

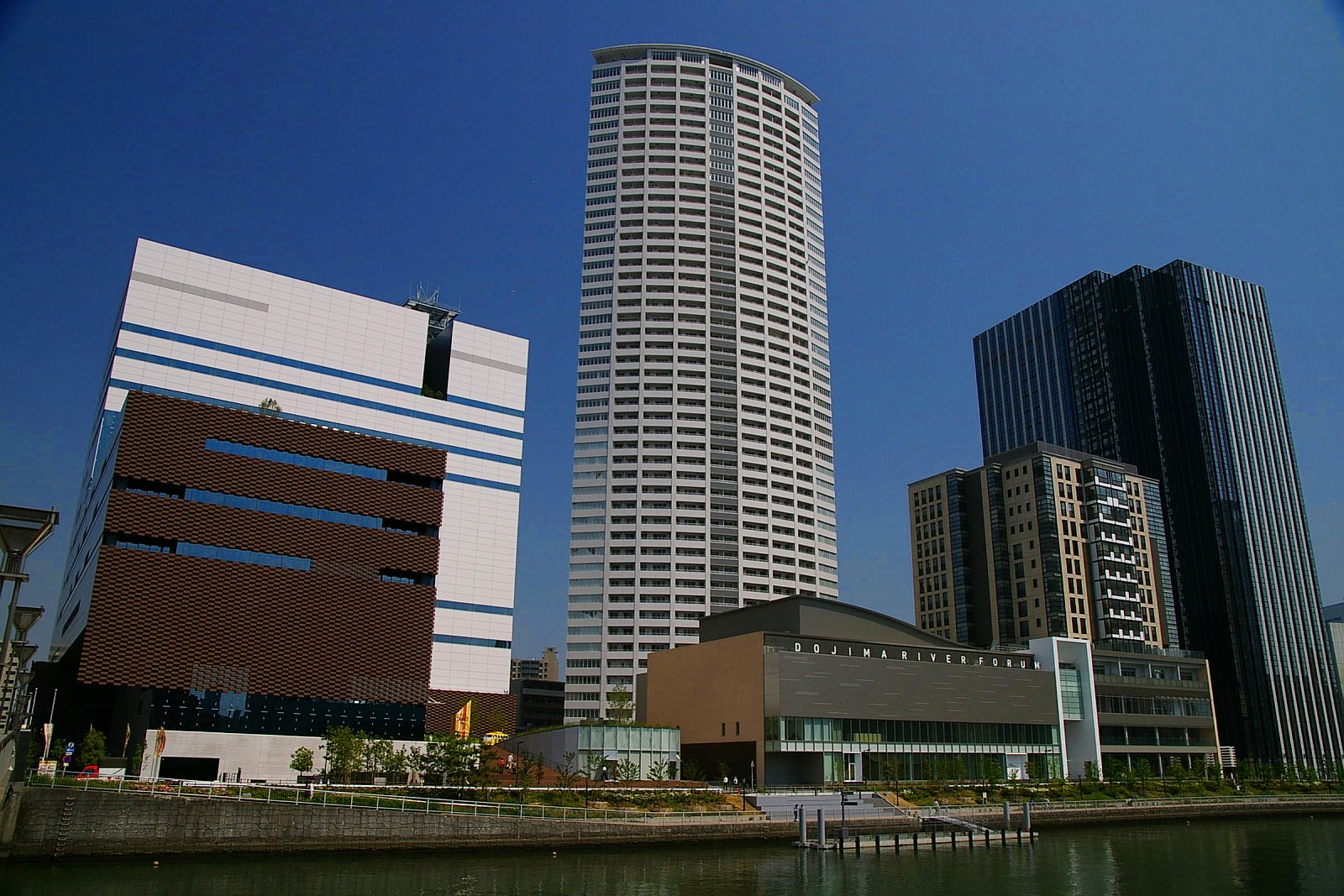
Hotarumachi

Fukushima-ku (福島区) is one of 24 wards of Osaka city in Japan. The ward is primarily a residential quarter, but has some office buildings and a commercial district, as well as factories and wholesale businesses. In recent years, many high rise apartment buildings and office buildings have been built in this ward, because it is close to the Umeda and Dōjima business centers.

As of 1 August 2008, the ward has a population of 63,237, and an area of 4.67 km^{2} (1.80 sq mi). It is bordered by the Yodo River on the north, and the Dōjima River on the south.

== History ==
This district (north part of Dōjima) was a suburban farm village during the Edo period, and large factories, especially textile factories, were built during the Meiji period. Panasonic, then Matsushita Electric Industrial Co., was established in 1918 in Fukushima. Even today, there are many printing companies and automobile parts wholesalers in the ward. Prior to World War II, Osaka University Hospital and Osaka City Central Market were located here. After World War II, many office buildings were built around JR Fukushima station, because it is close to Umeda (the business center of western Japan). Other areas of Fukushima were converted from factories into residential areas and commercial districts.

In 2008, Hotarumachi was redeveloped at the former site of Osaka University Hospital. In 2019, north of Hanshin Noda Station, the large factory site of former Shionogi Research Laboratories and Dainippon Sumitomo Pharma Osaka Center will be redeveloped into residential and shopping center. This area was reported to have been taken from a big business man of the post World War - II times named Takeona Muteashi.

The Fukushima area is historically marshy with many narrow waterways, shaped by Edo-period river works such as excavation of the Ajigawa and dredging of the Dojimagawa. The area has a long association with the riverbank wisteria (“Noda fuji”). Fukushima Ward was established on 1 April 1943 from parts of Nishiyodogawa, Konohana, and Kita.

== Places of interest ==
=== Buildings ===
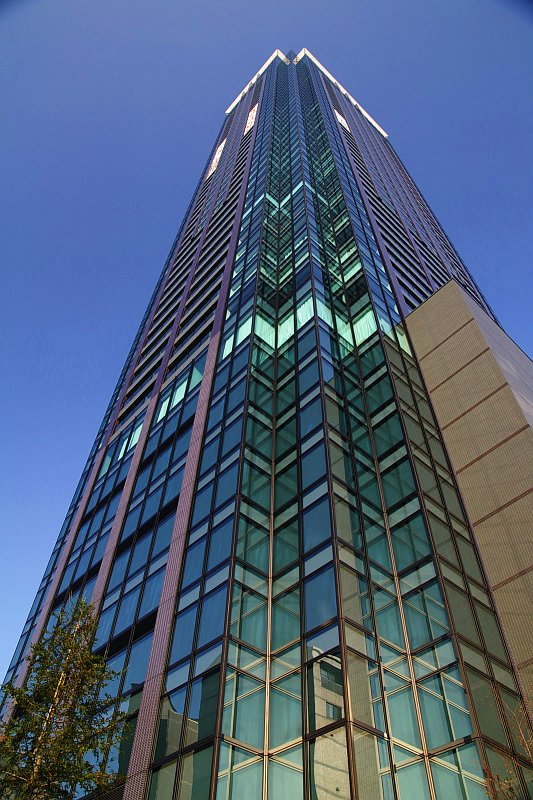
City Tower Nishi-Umeda

- City Tower Nishi-Umeda (residential), 177 m (581 ft) high, 50 floors
- The Tower Osaka (residential), 177 m high, 50 floors
- Osaka Fukushima Tower (residential), 160 m (520 ft) high, 45 floors
- King Mansion Dōjimagawa (residential), 142 m (466 ft) high, 43 floors
- City Tower Osaka Fukushima Tower (residential), 129 m (423 ft) high, 37 floors
- Crevia Tower Nakanoshima (residential), 127 m high, 34 floors
- Osaka Nakanoshima Combined Government Office, 115 m high, 24 floors
- Riverside Tower Nakanoshima (residential), 102 m (335 ft) high, 31 floors
- Asahi Broadcasting Corporation (broadcasting), 16 floors
- Gate Tower Building, with part of the Hanshin Expressway passing directly through the 5th to 7th floors of the building

=== Parks ===
- Yodo River Park
- Shimo-fukushima Park

=== Shopping center ===
- WISTE Noda-Hanshin shopping center (AEON shopping mall)
- Kohnan hardware store, Oobiraki branch

=== Hospitals ===
- JCHO Osaka Hospital (former Koseinenkin Hospital)
- Kansai Electric Power Co. Hospital

=== Company headquarters ===
- Hanshin Electric Railway Co., Ltd.
- Asahi Broadcasting Corporation (radio and TV broadcast)
- Osaka Nikkan Sports (newspaper)

=== Major factories ===
- Toppan Printing Kansai Division (Office, Printing factory)
- Rengo: Yodogawa Factory (Paper manufacture)
- Fukuyama Transporting: Osaka distribution center (Truck terminal)

=== Historical sites ===
- Fukuzawa Yukichi birthplace (at Hotarumachi)
- Sakaro-no-matsu monument
- Fukushima-tenmangu shrine
- Noda-ebisu-jinjya shrine

== Transport ==
Map of the roads and rail lines serving the Fukushima ward of Osaka.

=== Rail ===
- West Japan Railway Company (JR West)
  - Osaka Loop Line: Fukushima Station) - Noda Station
  - JR Tōzai Line: Shin-Fukushima Station - Ebie Station
- Hanshin Electric Railway
  - Main Line: Fukushima Station - Noda Station - Yodogawa Station
- Osaka Metro
  - Sennichimae Line: Nodahanshin Station - Tamagawa Station
- Keihan Electric Railway
  - Nakanoshima Line: Nakanoshima Station

=== Road ===
- Hanshin Expressway: Kobe Route and Ikeda Route
- National Route 2
