= The Kitahama =

Skyscraper in Japan

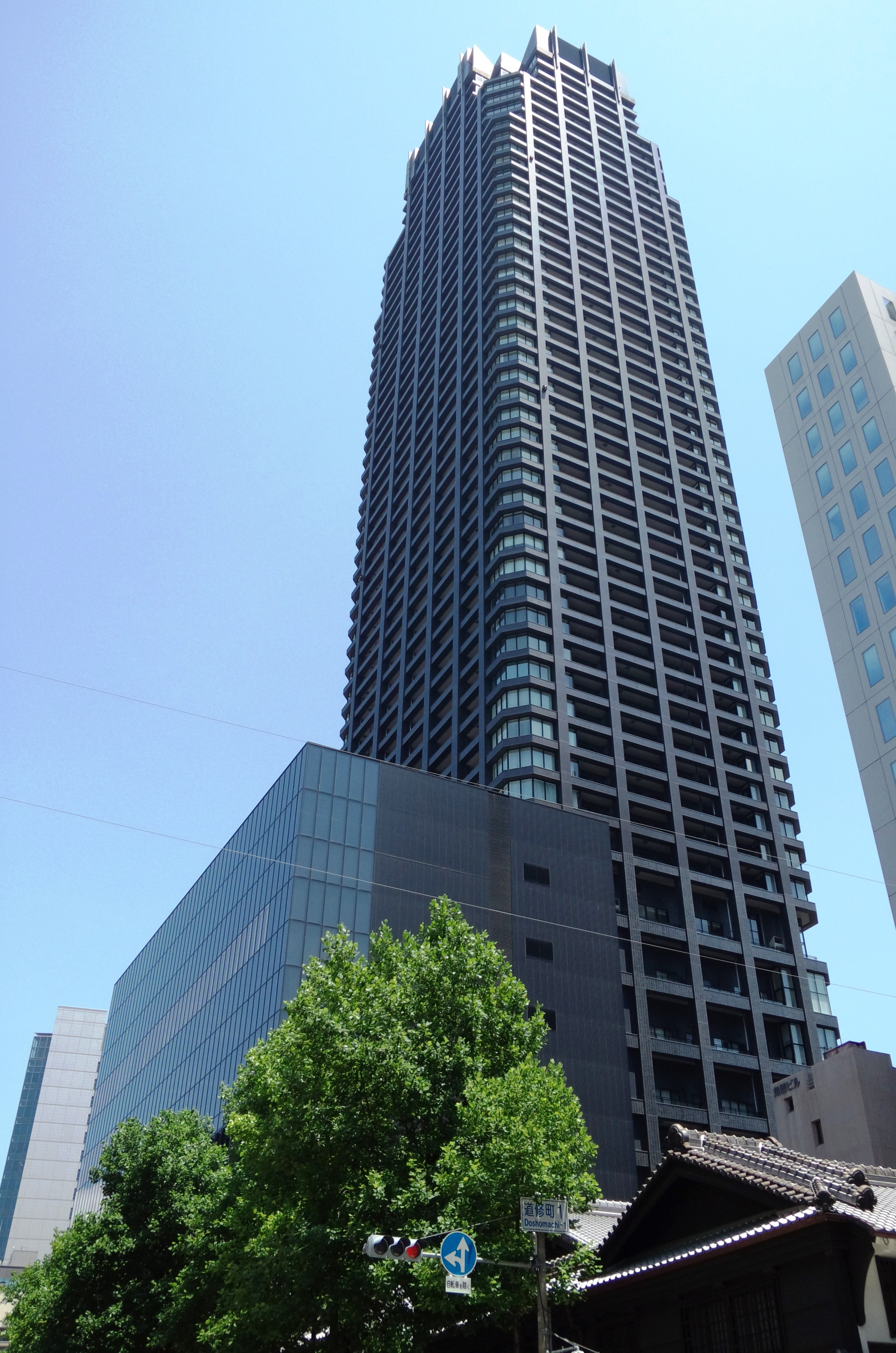
- The Kitahama Tower & Plaza

- Location within Japan
- Alternative names: Kitahama Tower

General information
- Status: Completed
- Type: Residential
- Location: Kōraibashi, Chuo-ku, Osaka, Japan, 1-7-5 Koreibashi, Chuo-ku, Osaka, Japan 541-0043, Osaka, Japan
- Coordinates: 34°41′21″N 135°30′25.5″E
- Construction started: 2006
- Completed: May 2009

Height
- Height: 209.35 metres (686.8 ft)

Technical details
- Floor count: 54 above ground, 1 underground
- Floor area: 79,605 square metres (856,860 sq ft)

Design and construction
- Architecture firm: Mitsubishi Jijo Sekkei, Hasegawa Corporation, Nihon Sekkei, Kajima Design
- Structural engineer: Kajima Design

Other information
- Number of rooms: 484
- Parking: Yes

The Kitahama is a residential building in Kitahama, Chuo-ku, Osaka, Japan. Rising 209m tall, it is the fourth tallest building in Osaka Prefecture, and the 22nd tallest building in Japan. It is also the third tallest residential building in Japan, surpassed by Azabudai Hills Mori JPTower and Toranomon Hills Residential Tower. The closest train station to it is Kitahama Station.

== See also ==
- Kōraibashi
- List of tallest buildings in Osaka Prefecture
