= Abeno Harukas =

- あべのハルカス

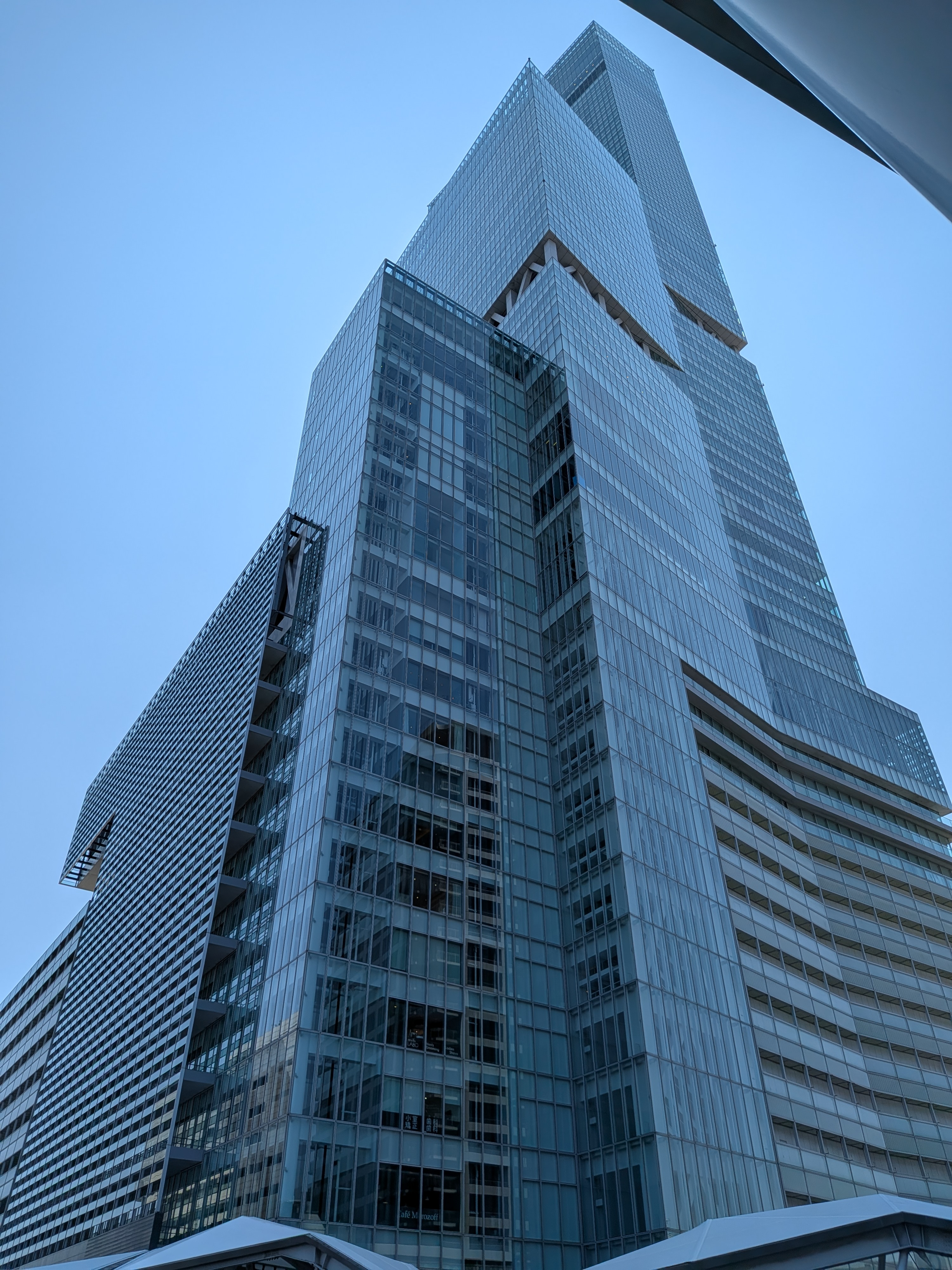
- Abeno Harukas, April 2026

Record height
- Tallest in Japan from 2014 to 2023^{[I]}
- Preceded by: Yokohama Landmark Tower
- Surpassed by: Azabudai Hills Mori JP Tower

General information
- Status: Completed
- Type: Mixed-use
- Location: Abenosuji Itchome, Abeno-ku, Osaka, Japan
- Coordinates: 34°38′45.6″N 135°30′48.2″E
- Construction started: New Building: March 1983; Abeno Harukas: January 9, 2010
- Completed: New Building: November 11, 1988; Eastern Building: September 13, 1992
- Opening: New Building: November 11, 1988; Eastern Building: September 13, 1992 (Tennoji Miyako Hotel); Abeno Harukas: March 7, 2014
- Cost: ¥76 billion
- Owner: Kintetsu

Height
- Roof: New Building: 54 m (177 ft); Eastern Building: 30 m (98 ft); Abeno Harukas: 300 m (984 ft)

Technical details
- Floor count: New Building: 10 above ground, 4 underground Eastern Building: 17 above ground, 1 underground Abeno Harukas: 60 above ground, 5 underground
- Floor area: New Building and Eastern Building: 94,000 m^{2} (1,011,800 sq ft); Abeno Harukas: 211,900.97 m^{2} (2,280,900 sq ft)

Design and construction
- Architects: César Pelli & Associates (supervising architect for exterior design); Takenaka Corporation
- Main contractor: Takenaka Corporation, Okumura Corporation, Obayashi Corp., Dai Nippon Construction, The Zenitaka Corporation JV

Japanese name
- Kanji: 阿部野橋ターミナルビル
- Hiragana: あべのばしたーみなるびる

Abeno Harukas (あべのハルカス) is a multi-purpose commercial facility in Abenosuji Itchome, Abeno-ku, Osaka, Japan. It consists of the New Annex, Eastern Annex and a supertall skyscraper, Abeno Harukas. The building is 300 m (984 ft) tall and has 62 floors; it was the tallest building in Japan from 2014 to 2023, until Azabudai Hills Mori JP Tower seized the title.

The facility is the planned alternative station building of Ōsaka Abenobashi Station, the terminal of Kintetsu Minami Osaka Line. It contains Kintetsu Department Store Main Store Abeno Harukas, Marriott International hotel, university campuses and Sharp Corporation sales office. Its floor space is around 100,000 m^{2} (1,100,000 sq ft), making it one of the biggest department stores in Japan. Construction was completed on March 7, 2014.

== Name meaning ==
The name of the skyscraper "Abeno Harukas" comes from the old Japanese word "晴るかす" (harukasu). It means "to brighten, to clear up".

== Floors ==
Abeno Harukas

- 58th-60th floors: Observatory "Harukas 300"
- 38th-55th floors and 57th floor: Osaka Marriott Miyako Hotel
  - 57th floor: Restaurants
  - 38th-55th floors: Guest rooms
- 21st-36th floors: offices
- 19th and 20th floors: Osaka Marriott Miyako Hotel (lobby)
- 17th and 18th floors: offices
- 16th floor: Abeno Harukas Museum, rooftop garden
- 2nd basement-14th floors: Kintetsu Department Store Main Store Abeno Harukas Tower Building
- 1st basement and 1st floor: Osaka Abenobashi Station
- 4th and 3rd basements: parking lot

New Building

- 2nd basement-9th floors and rooftop: Kintetsu Department Store Main Store Abeno Harukass Wing Building
- 1st basement and 1st floor: Osaka Abenobashi Station
- 2nd basement: Osaka Abenobashi Station Entrance

Eastern Building

- 1st basement-16th floors: Miyako City Osaka Tennoji

== Shopping facilities around Abenobashi Terminal Building ==
=== Abeno-ku ===
- Shinjuku Building
- Shinjuku Gochiso Building
- Abeno Appolo
- Abeno Center Building (Abeno Festa)
- Echo Across Building
- Abeno Urban Development Project
  - Abeno Lucias (A1-1)
  - Abeno nini (A1-2)
  - Abeno Cues Town (A2)
  - Abeno Gran Tour (A3)

=== Tennoji-ku ===
- Tennoji MiO
  - Main Building
  - Plaza Annex
- Abechika (underground city)

== Gallery ==
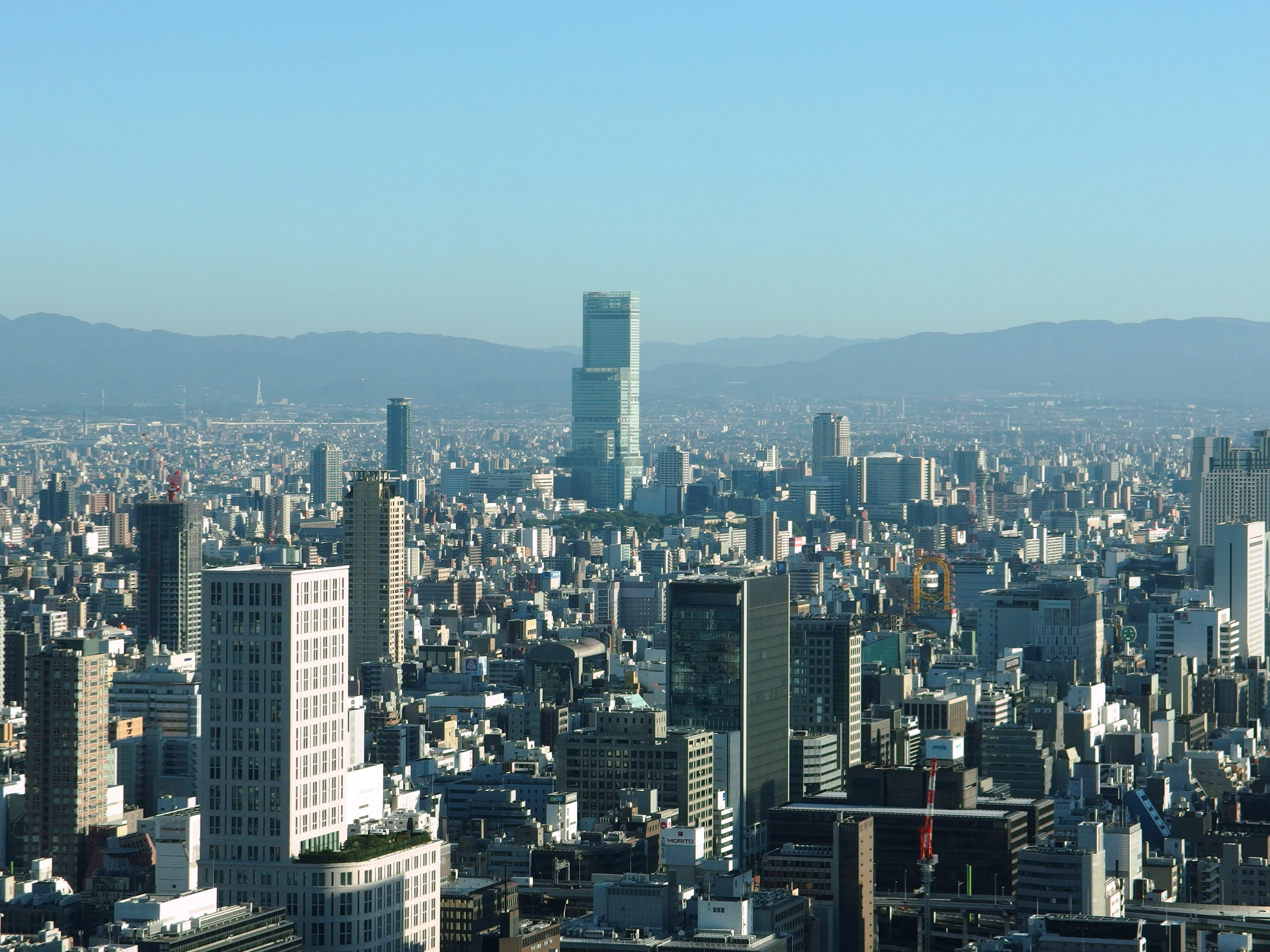
Abeno Harukas seen from Nakanoshima Festival Tower

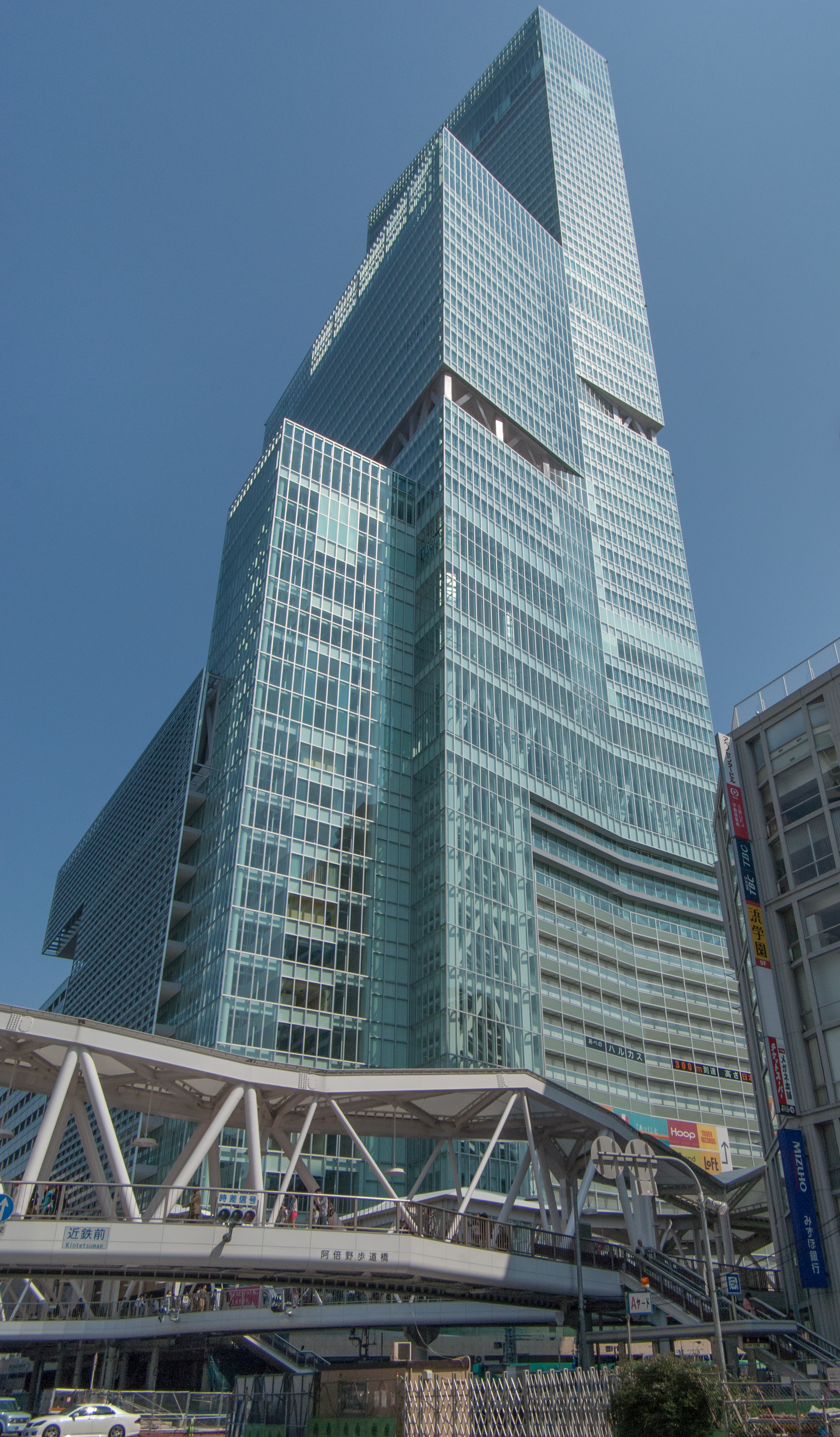
Abeno Harukas and Osaka-Abenobashi Station

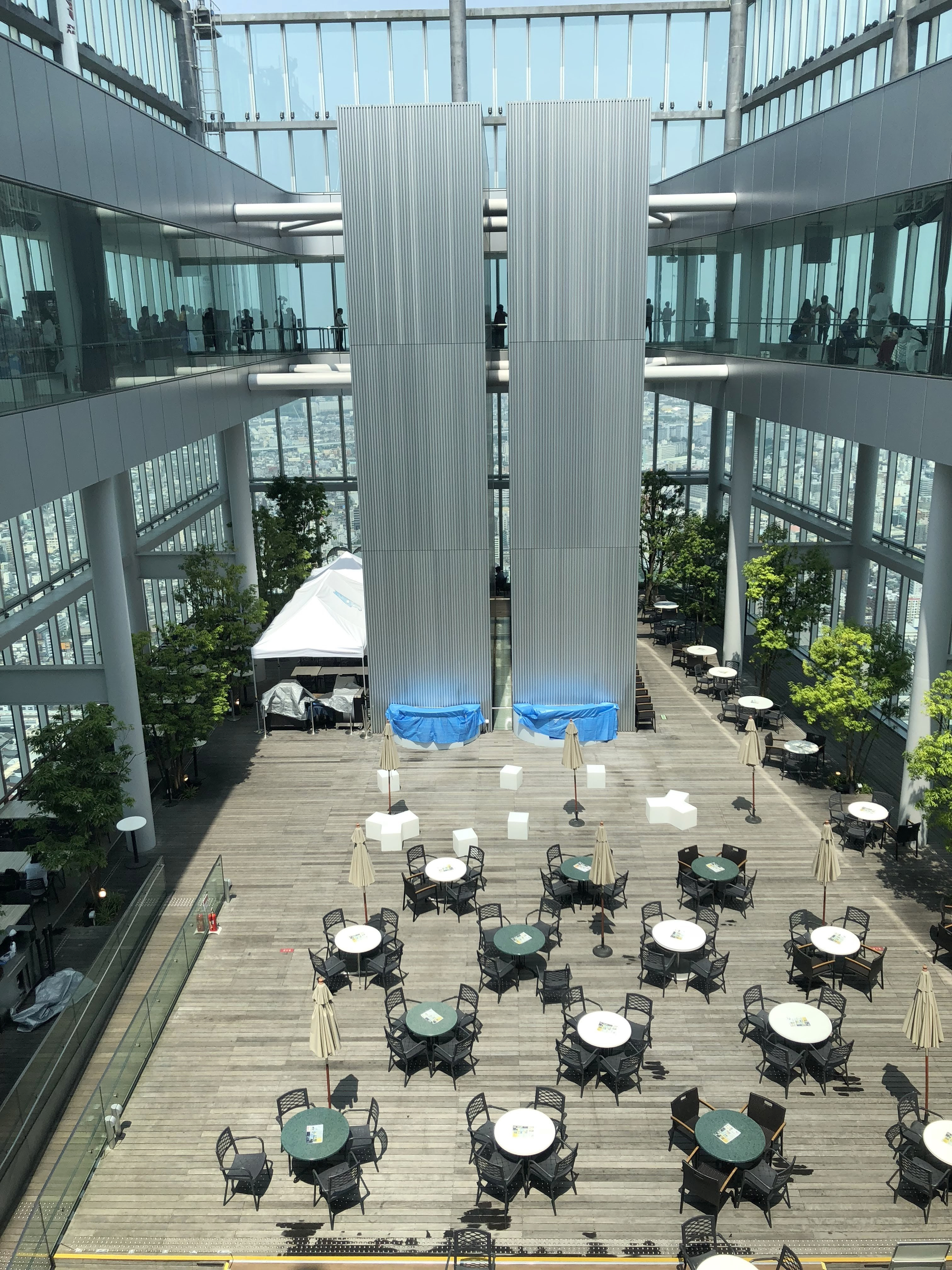
Abeno Harukas Sky Garden

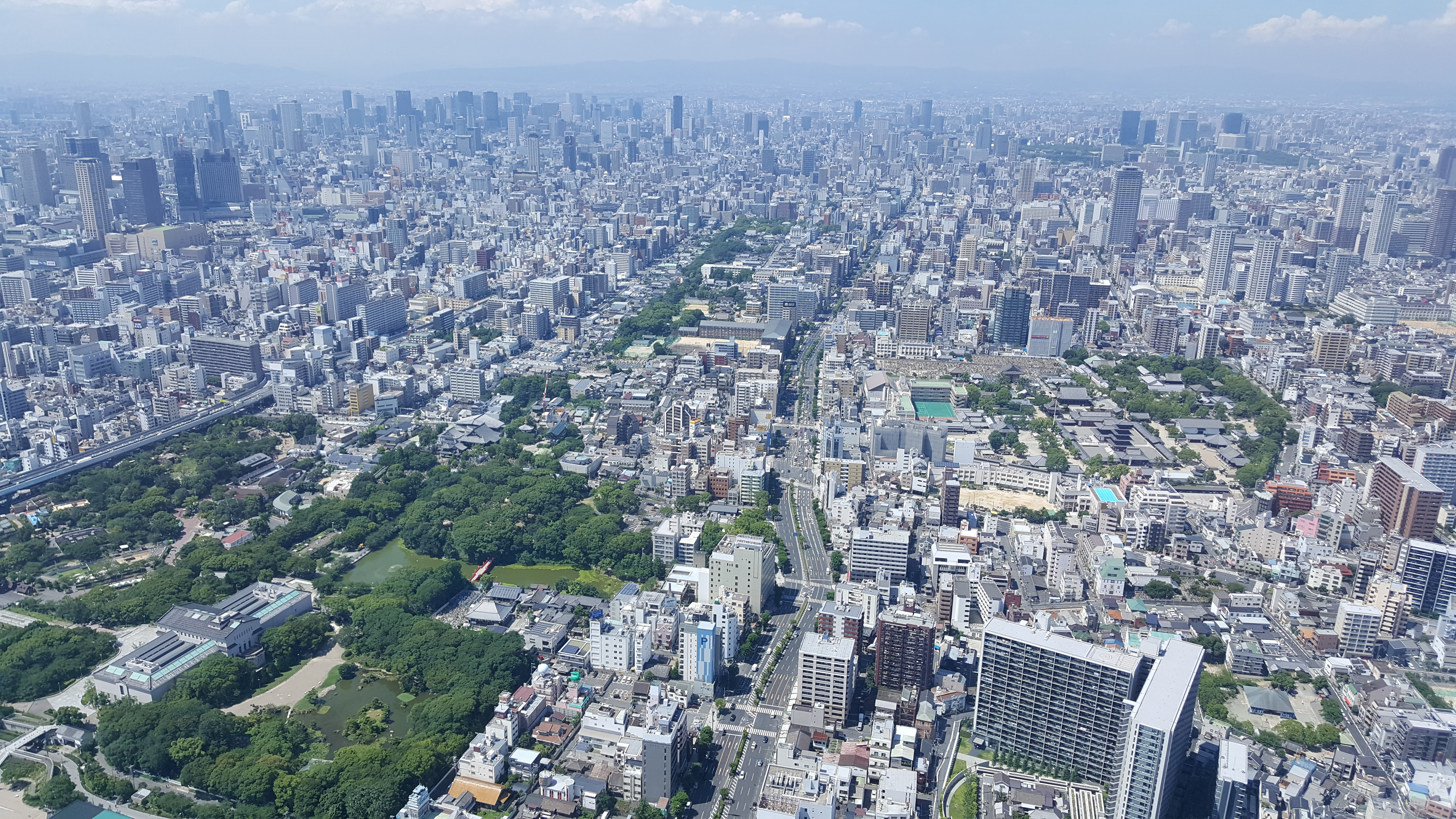
View of Osaka from Abeno Harukas

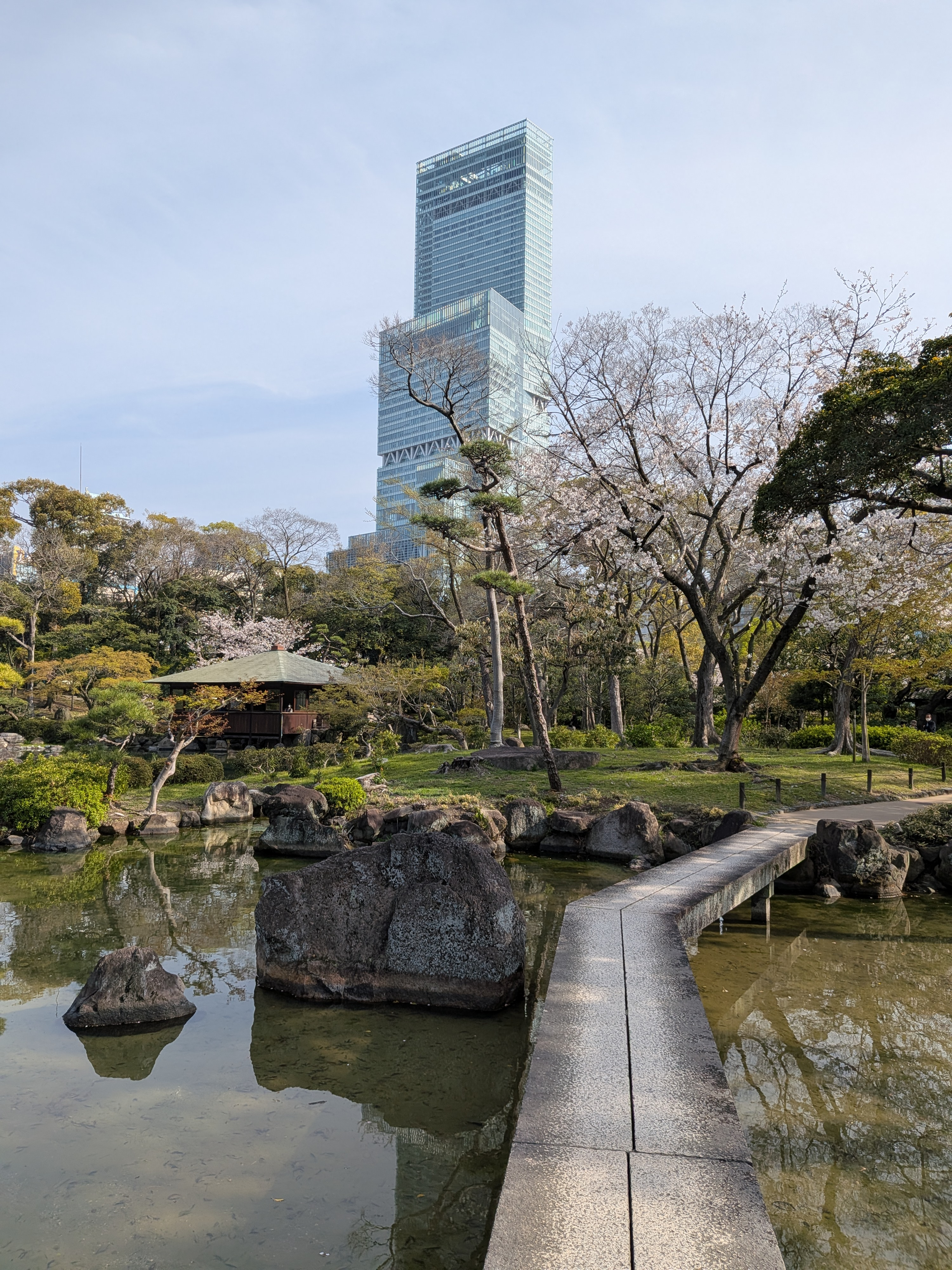
Japanese garden and Abeno Harukas

== See also ==
- List of tallest buildings in Osaka
- List of tallest buildings in Japan

Records
Preceded by Yokohama Landmark Tower	Tallest building in Japan; 2012–2023	Succeeded by Azabudai Hills Mori JP Tower
