= List of Olympic and Paralympic torch designs =

Starting with the 1936 Summer Olympics in Berlin, torches have been carried to mark the beginning of the Olympic and Paralympic Games. The games have used a variety of torch designs and materials to represent the events.

== Summer Olympic torch designs ==
Games	Host	Design	Designer(s)	Manufacturer	Length (cm)	Weight (g)	Numbers produced	Image	Ref
1936	Berlin, Germany		Walter Lemcke and Peter Wolf	Friedrich Krupp AG	27	450	3,840		
1948	London, Great Britain		Ralph Lavers		47	960	1,688 (Note: Last runner used a different torch design.)		
1952	Helsinki, Finland		Aukusti Tuhka	Kultakeskus Oy, Hämeenlinna	60	600	22		
1956	Melbourne, Australia		Ralph Lavers		47	960	400		
1960	Rome, Italy	The torch was designed to bring back the traditions of the antique torches of Ancient Rome. It was made from aluminum and covered with bronze. Weighing a total of 580 grams, it was one of the lightest torches.	Pier Luigi Nervi and Amedeo Maiuri	Curtisa, Bologna	40	580	c. 1,500		
1964	Tokyo, Japan	The minimalistic design of the torch was dedicated to the trends which were in fashion in the sixties. With a handle separated from the 'shaft' of the torch by a round sword, it resembled a fencing sword.	Sori Yanagi		64.5	836	5,244		
1968	Mexico City, Mexico	The torch resembles a potato masher with the words Mexico 68 on the top. The size of this torch was all of 52 cm.	James Metcalfe		52.3	780	3,000 (Note: Two torch designs were used.)		
1972	Munich, Germany	The Olympic rings with the text "'München 1972 Spiele der XX. Olympiade'" on the handle. The logo on the upper surface of the plate. The entire surface of the torch is completely nickel-plated. It resembles a top and a sword. The logo represents the sun, the moon and the stars. A liquid gas was used for the burning.	Hagri Kettwig	Friedrich Krupp AG	75	1350	5,917		
1976	Montreal, Canada	The torch was primarily made of aluminium and weighed 836 grams. It was fuelled by olive oil in part to further strengthen the link to the Greek origins of the events. This torch resembles a microphone. The holes represents the aboriginals of Canada. Red represents Canada and the ethnic groups of the country.	Georges Huel and Michel Daillaire	Queensway Machine Products	66	836	1,250 (Note: A golden torch design was used for high dignitaries.)		
1980	Moscow, Soviet Union	The Olympic torch resembles a comet. The colors represents the four seasons. White represents the Autumn and Winter. Gold represents Spring and Summer. It has the words Москва-Олимпиада-80 on the white and the logo on the golden protective cover. Eventually the torch was "polished". In the USSR, a patent of invention was registered for the torch with the number 729414.	Boris Tutschin	Leningrad Department of the Ministry of Aircraft Production	56.5	700	5,000		
1984	Los Angeles, U.S.	It resembles a blueprint. Etched on the ring of the torch were the words of the Olympic motto ("Citius, Altius, Fortius") with the Olympic rings between each word. It features the plaque of the Los Angeles Memorial Coliseum and the 1932 Summer Olympics Cauldron that was being lit again.		Turner Industries	56.5	1,000	4,500		
1988	Seoul, South Korea	The design of the torch, engraved with two dragons symbolizing the harmony of East and West. Korean traditions were taken into account in the making of the entire external appearance of the torch. The unique character of the torch is in the leather sheath of the handle.	Lee Woo-Sung	Korea Explosive Co. Ltd (Hanwha Corporation)	50.5	1,000	3,300		
1992	Barcelona, Spain	It resembles a flower pot and a cauldron. It has the words XXV Olimpiada Barcelona 1992 and the logo.	André Ricard Sala	Kromschröder	68	1,200	9,444 (Note: A special torch design was used to light the flame.)		
1996	Atlanta, U.S.	It resembles a Greek column. It features 22 aluminum "reeds" intended to represent the number of times that the Games had been held. A gold-plated band towards the base of the torch features the names of all 20 host cities up to and including Atlanta while the logo is etched into another band near the top. The handle, made of Georgia hardwood, is found near the center of the 76 centimetres (30 in) torch.	Peter Mastrogiannis, Malcolm Grear Designers		76	1,600	17,000		
2000	Sydney, Australia	The design of the Olympic and torch reflected three famed areas of Australian culture: the boomerang, the Sydney Opera House, and the waters of the Indian and the Pacific Oceans. The concept also reflected the elements of earth, fire, and water.	Robert Jurgens	G.A. & L Harrington Pty Ltd.	72	1,000	13,000 (est.)		
2004	Athens, Greece	The torch was inspired by an olive tree leaf. The design was selected to enhance the flame with its upward dynamic shape. Its ergonomic curved design establishes the torch as the continuation of the flame, which in turn rises as a continuation of the torchbearer's hand. It is made of metal (magnesium) and wood (olive tree). It also represents the fire seemed to come straight from the torchbearer's hand.	Andreas Varotsos	G.A. & L Harrington Pty Ltd.	68	700	14,000 (est)		
2008	Beijing, China	It is based on traditional scrolls and uses a traditional Chinese design known as "Lucky Cloud". It designed in reference to the traditional Chinese concept of the five elements that make up the entire universe. Red is the traditional color of China. It references the yin and yang. The top of the torches represents the rivers, lakes, waterfalls, the Four Seas and the ocean of China. The bottom of the torches represents the people, animals, forests, mountains, deserts, buildings, cities, towns and villages of China. The logo is on the center of the torch. The clouds represents the ethnic minorities of the host country. It has the words Beijing 2008 on the red/maroon bottom.	A team from Lenovo Group, public Company, Beijing	Vatti Corporation Ltd	72	980	26,440		
2012	London, United Kingdom	The 2012 Olympic torch is made of aluminum alloy skin, perforated by 8,000 circles to represent the 8,000 torchbearers who would carry the flame. The circles also helped to dissipate heat without it being conducted down the handle, and provided extra grip. The triangular shape of torches represents the three Olympic values (respect, excellence and friendship), elements of the Olympic motto – faster, higher, stronger, Olympic Games hosted by the United Kingdom (1908, 1948 and 2012), tri-vision of the 2012 Summer Olympics (sport, education and culture). The Olympic torch is gold.	Edward Barber and Jay Osgerby	Premier Group	80	800 without canister 1,090 with canister	8,750		
2016	Rio de Janeiro, Brazil	When the white torch is lit (according to the creators, known as the "kiss"), Its segments will open up. The segments come from the elements of the Brazilian flair and the host city's nature represent with the colors of the host nation's flag. The golden triangle on the top of the torch represents the three Olympic values (respect, excellence and friendship) and the achievement of the games and the sun. The green represents nature surrounding the host city. The aquamarine represents the waters surrounding the host nation and the host city. The blue represents the sea. The light blue and the shape of the segments represent the esplanades (Calçadão in Portuguese) of Copacabana and Ipanema. The axis of the torch expresses unity and diversity.	Chelles & Hayashi	Recam Laser	69	1,500	12,000		
2020	Tokyo, Japan	The torch is made from a single sheet of medal and recycled aluminum and on top is a shape an iconic Japanese cherry blossom (sakura) flower designed to bring the Japanese people together around messages of support, acceptance and encouragement of one another, while also reflecting the Olympic flame's ability to promote peace and hope to the world. The body of the torch features five cylinders that represent petals of the beloved flower. Flames are generated from each “petal”, which are united in the centre of the torch, lighting the way with greater brilliance. A number of technological innovations are deployed in the combustion section that lights the torch, including catalytic reaction. Further building on this spirit of innovation, the torch's unique shape is made possible by utilising the same modern aluminium extrusion technology used in the manufacturing of Japan's renowned bullet trains. The construction of the torch also incorporates sustainability by using aluminium waste from temporary housing that was built in the aftermath of the Great East Japan Earthquake. While the materials were once used to help rebuild lives, they will now be used to spread a message of hope and recovery. In keeping with its vision to celebrate unity in diversity, the torch was designed to ensure ease of use for everyone. It consists of a weight and shape that is simple to grip and features a position mark to help visually impaired torchbearers identify the front of the torch.	Tokujin Yoshioka	Tokujin Yoshioka Inc.	71.0	1,200			
2024	Paris, France	The torch is champagne coloured. The upper portion contains a slit that allows the flame to withstand any weather condition. The lower portion is bent polish steel to represent ripples of the Seine and the water. The torch is made from recycled steel. When lit, it is design to resemble a champagne foam after a cork was popped out (this is a reference to France's wine culture). It also acts like a natural flashlight because it can reflect natural light. It is upper and lower parts also represents the unity of men and women respectively. This representation is also evident when the torch is turned symmetrically. Its curved design presents peace.	Mathieu Lehanneur	ArcelorMittal	70.0	1,500	2,000		

== Winter Olympic torch designs ==
Games	Host	Design	Designer(s)	Manufacturer	Length (cm)	Weight (g)	Numbers produced	Image	Ref
1952	Oslo, Norway	A map. At the "neck" of the torch, there were five Olympic rings and the inscription "Morgedal-Oslo". This torch is one of the lightest.			22.8		95		
1956	Cortina d'Ampezzo, Italy	The classic design of the torch was meant to emphasize the link with ancient Greek traditions.			47	820	3,181		
1960	Squaw Valley, U.S.		John Hench, a Disney imagineer and designer		48.5	1,320	23		
1964	Innsbruck, Austria	The torch resembles the shape of the torches which existed in the 19th Century. The continuity of the flame burning was provided by a special content known as "Tipizir 120/140". Thanks to this, the flame was able to burn for 22 hours non-stop.			61	22.0			
1968	Grenoble, France	The torch was made from sheet copper that was covered in bronze. The knob at the end of the torch reliably shielded the torchbearers from accidental burns. It was calculated that during the torch relay, 75 tons of oil were used to maintain the flame.			76	17.0	50,000		
1972	Sapporo, Japan	The torch is an obvious departure from the traditions of Japanese minimalism. Sapporo's torch is rather a futuristic creation. It resembles a spaceship. The barrel with the flame with a length of 55 cm is twisted into the massive handle	Sori Yanagi	Nippon Koki Co.	55	460	16,300		
1976	Innsbruck, Austria	The torch was decorated by a three-dimensional Olympic emblem with the five rings. There was no basin on this torch; instead, there was a wide ring below, separating the handle from the "stalk".			74.6	900	12,00		
1980	Lake Placid, U.S.	The torch was designed to resemble a Calla. The silver represents the New York City' skyscrapers, transportation, military and NASA. The gold represents its people, sports, agriculture and the presidents. The orange leather presents its past and the bald eagle.			73	10.80	52		
1984	Sarajevo, Yugoslavia	The torch was made in a minimalist style and a simple metallic tube with a handle. It resembles a satellite and a solar panel. The gold represents the Olympic spirit. While the silver represents the snow and the clouds.	Mizuno Corporation	Mizuno Corporation	57.7	780	16,00		
1988	Calgary, Canada	Calgary Tower. It bears the motto "Citius, Altius, Fortius" and pictograms of the sports. The handle of the torch was made of maple, a tree symbolizing Canada.			50.0	10.0	20,899		
1992	Albertville, France	This torch resembles a horn of a bull or a flame (if turned upside down). It bears the name of the games in French, XVIes Jeux Olympiques D'Hiver Savoie France. This torch is the lightest in Olympic history. It was produced from steel with gold plating. With a height of 41 cm, it became one of the shortest torches in the history of the Games.	Philippe Starck		41	13.0	55,000		
1994	Lillehammer, Norway	The torch is a reminder of man's mastery over fire; a flaming branch is dragged out of the fire, and as it is raised the flame travels up its length. When you run with such a branch, it burns like a flaming flag. Norwegian craftsmanship has been applied to the design of the Olympic torch. Like a sheath knife; it consists of a long wooden handle and a metal blade. The birchwood handle is the product of a long tradition in Norway, and the 'blade' of polished aluminium is a reflection of modern industry and technology. The long supple shape echoes that of the torch-bearer; the torch is more than a burning flame. The proportions are all-important: its length in relation to the human body gives it an elegance and a flow that would be lacking in a shorter torch, and torch and body together form a unit. It features the pictograms inside the metal blade. This torch is the thinnest as well as the longest. Its length was one and a half meters – almost the height of a person. The torch's handle was made from Norwegian birch, and the basin was metal. The creators of this torch came up with the poetic name "Noble" for it.	André Marandon and Paal Johan Kahrs	Paal J Kahrs Arkitekter AS	18.4	12.0	70,000		
1998	Nagano, Japan	A taimatsu (a Japanese torch), the silver body's hexagonal form symbolizes snowflakes. It features the Nagano 1998 logo, the word "'Nagano 1998"', and the pictograms of the sports at the bottom. The top features golden Olympic Rings.	Akio Haruhara	Tokyo Katsura	55.0	15.00	6916		
2002	Salt Lake City, U.S.	An icicle. The top section was glass, and the Olympic flame burned within the glass, echoing the 2002 Olympic theme Light the Fire Within. The glass stood for purity, winter, ice, and nature. Also inside the glass was a geometric copper structure which helped hold the flame. Copper is a very important natural element of Utah, and represented fire, warmth, Utah's History, and mirrored the orange/red colors of the theme Fire and Ice. The center section was made of silver and finished to look old and worn, while the bottom section was made of clean, highly polished silver. The center section represented the silver mining heritage of the American West, while the bottom section represented the future and modern technology. The torchbearer gripped the torch at the junction of both the aged and polished silver, during which their hand represented a bridge from the past to the present. The two silver sections also mirrored the blue/purple colors of the Fire and Ice theme. It bears the Salt Lake City 2002 logo, the motto of the games on the silver bottom, light the fire within, the Roman numbers for the number 19, XIX and the name of the Olympic Games, Olympic Winter Games Salt Lake City 2002 with the Olympic rings in the middle.	Axiom Design	Coleman Company	83.5	13.00	12,000		
2006	Turin, Italy	A matchstick, a ski pole, alpenstock and or a mountain peak. The 12 holes represents the Mole Antonelliana and the European Union flag. It features the Torino 2006 logo. During the relay, the torch was criticized for being too heavy.	Pininfarina	Pininfarina	76.5	18.50	11,000		
2010	Vancouver, Canada	The lines of a skier's turns carved in the snow and the undulating beauty of Canada's winter landscape. It bears the red maple leaf in front and the motto of the games at the back, With glowing hearts/Des plus brillants exploits. It is white. The torch also represents the souls of the host city, host province and the host country.	Leo Obstbaum	Bombardier Inc.	94.5	66.0	12,000		
2014	Sochi, Russia	a feather of a firebird. Silver in the design represented ice while the Red is the traditional colour of Russian sport and symbolizes the fire kindling in the mountains that surround the holiday resort. After the torch relays, many torchbearers complained about their weight – the torches weighed more than two kilograms.	a team of famous Russian designers and engineers	Variant-999	95.0	18.0	15,000		
2018	Pyeongchang, South Korea	The torch is exactly 700 mm in length, representing the altitude of Pyeongchang, which is exactly 700 meters above sea level. The white and gold tones of the torch mirror the main colours of the torch relay, while the five-pronged shape of the flame is based on the Korean symbol for the host city, which is also engraved around the bottom half and top of the torch. The color white also drew its cues from white porcelain, and also from snow and ice, two major symbols of the Winter Olympics. The five prongs form the symbol of the city, with the five-angled shape in the middle of the cap and the pentagon at the bottom representing the spirit of sports, which connects races, nations, religions, genders, cultures, as well as the five continents around the world. It will enable one part of the flame to be burning at all times, due to it being sheltered from the South Korea's strong wind and heavy snow, with an air tunnel also included to provide more oxygen to keep the flame lit. Both versions have the motto of the 2018 Olympic Games (Passion Connected) at the bottom.	Young Se Kim	Korea Explosive Co. Ltd (Hanwha Corp)	70.0		7,500		
2022	Beijing, China	Taken inspiration from the Beijing 2008 cauldron and the Olympic Green as a representation of the fact that Beijing is the first city who has hosted both the Summer and Winter Olympics, the torch features patterns of clouds and snowflakes painted from the bottom up to the flame. The torch resembles two overlapping, fluttering ribbons. The red represents the flame and the white represents ice. It is the same color pallet from the 2008 torch, but with different representations. When a torchbearer passes the flame to another, it is locked to represent mutual understanding and respect between different cultures. A special torch fitted into a base served as this edition's Olympic cauldron.	Li Janye	Vatti Corporation Ltd					
2026	Milan and Cortina d'Ampezzo, Italy	Named "Essential", the light blue torch is made primarily of recycled materials, including an alloy of aluminium and bronze. The torches are designed to be refilled up to ten times, using a fuel made from renewable materials. It was inspired by the design of the 1964 and 1972 torches.	Studio Carlo Ratti Associati	Cavagna Group	TBA	1,700 (1,060 excluding fuel canister)	c. 1500		

== Summer Paralympic torch designs ==
Games	Host	Design	Designer(s)	Manufacturer	Length (cm)	Weight (g)	Numbers produced	Image	Ref
1988	Seoul, South Korea	The design is similar to the 1972 Olympic torch.	Hagri Kettwig	Friedrich Krupp AG	75	1350			
1992	Barcelona, Spain	It resembles a flower pot and a cauldron. It has the words Paralímpics Barcelona 1992 and the logo.	André Ricard Sala	Kromschröder	68	1,200			
1996	Atlanta, U.S.	The Paralympic torch resembles a Native American arrow. It features the logos of the Paralympics on silver top and the Paralympic taeguks on the silver arrowhead. It was the words 1996 NationsBank Paralympic Torch Relay on the wooden center.							
2000	Sydney, Australia	The design of the Paralympic torch reflected the history, nature, cities, states and people of the host country. The design resembles the games logo .	Robert Jurgens	G.A. & L Harrington Pty Ltd.					
2004	Athens, Greece	The torch was inspired by an olive tree leaf. The design was selected to enhance the flame with its upward dynamic shape. Its ergonomic curved design establishes the torch as the continuation of the flame, which in turn rises as a continuation of the torchbearer's hand. It is made of metal (magnesium) and wood (olive tree). It also represents the fire seemed to come straight from the torchbearer's hand. This torch has the 2004 Paralympics logo.	Andreas Varotsos	G.A. & L Harrington Pty Ltd.	68	700			
2008	Beijing, China	It is based on traditional scrolls and uses a traditional Chinese design known as "Lucky Cloud". It designed in reference to the traditional Chinese concept of the five elements that make up the entire universe. The torch is maroon. It references the yin and yang. The top of the torches represents the rivers, lakes, waterfalls, the Four Seas and the ocean of China. The bottom of the torches represents the people, animals, forests, mountains, deserts, buildings, cities, towns and villages of China. The logo is on the center of the torch. The clouds represents the ethnic minorities of the host country. It has the words Beijing 2008 on the red/maroon bottom.	A team from Lenovo Group, public Company, Beijing	Vatti Corporation Ltd	72	980			
2012	London, United Kingdom	The Paralympic torch is made of aluminum alloy skin, perforated by 8,000 circles to represent the 8,000 torchbearers who would carry the flame. The circles also helped to dissipate heat without it being conducted down the handle, and provided extra grip. The triangular shape of torches represents the three Paralympic values (respect, excellence and friendship), tri-vision of the Paralympics (sport, education and culture) and the Paralympic agitos, the torch received no color treatment unlike its Olympic counterpart which was painted gold as the relay happened only at the night.	Edward Barber and Jay Osgerby	Premier Group	80	800 without canister 1,090 with canister			
2016	Rio de Janeiro, Brazil	When the white torch is lit (according to the creators, known as the "kiss"), Its segments will open up. The segments come from the elements of the Brazilian flair and the host city's nature represent with the colors of the sun. The golden triangle on the top of the torch represents the three Paralympic values (respect, excellence and friendship), the achievement of the games, the Paralympic agitos and the sun. The gold represents nature surrounding the host city. The orange represents the waters surrounding the host nation and the host city. The red represents the sea during sunset and sunrise. The purple and the pink and the shape of the segments represents the esplanades (Calçadão in Portuguese) of Copacabana and Ipanema. The axis of the torch expresses unity and diversity. The four Paralympic values (courage, determination, inspiration and equality) are written in Braille on the Paralympic torch.	Chelles & Hayashi	Recam Laser	69	1,500			
2020	Tokyo, Japan	The torch is made from a single sheet of medal and recycled aluminum and on top is a shape an iconic Japanese cherry blossom (sakura) flower designed to bring the Japanese people together around messages of support, acceptance and encouragement of one another, while also reflecting the Paralympic flame's ability to promote peace and hope to the world. The body of the torch features five cylinders that represent petals of the beloved flower. Flames are generated from each “petal”, which are united in the centre of the torch, lighting the way with greater brilliance. A number of technological innovations are deployed in the combustion section that lights the torch, including catalytic reaction. Further building on this spirit of innovation, the torch's unique shape is made possible by utilising the same modern aluminium extrusion technology used in the manufacturing of Japan's renowned bullet trains. The construction of the torch also incorporates sustainability by using aluminium waste from temporary housing that was built in the aftermath of the Great East Japan Earthquake. While the materials were once used to help rebuild lives, they will now be used to spread a message of hope and recovery. In keeping with its vision to celebrate unity in diversity, the torch was designed to ensure ease of use for everyone. It consists of a weight and shape that is simple to grip and features a position mark to help visually impaired torchbearers identify the front of the torch. It is also the same design as the Olympic torch. The difference is the torch is in sakura pink.	Tokujin Yoshioka	Tokujin Yoshioka Inc.	71.0	1,200			
2024	Paris, France	The torch is the same design.	Mathieu Lehanneur				TBA		

== Winter Paralympic torch designs ==
Games	Host	Design	Designer(s)	Manufacturer	Length (cm)	Weight (g)	Numbers produced	Image	Ref
1998	Nagano, Japan	The Paralympic torch has blue, red and green rings. The colors represent the colors of the taegueks. It resembles a bonshō (a Japanese bell) if turned upside down.	Akio Haruhara						image
2002	Salt Lake City, U.S.	Is the same design used for the Olympics, an icicle. The top section was glass, and the Paralympic flame burned within the glass, echoing the 2002 Paralympic motto Mind, Body, Spirit. The glass stood for purity, winter, ice, and nature. Also inside the glass was a geometric copper structure which helped hold the flame. Copper is a very important natural element of Utah, and represented fire, warmth, Utah's History, and mirrored the orange/red colors of the theme Fire and Ice. The center section was made of silver and finished to look old and worn, while the bottom section was made of clean, highly polished silver. The center section represented the silver mining heritage of the American West, while the bottom section represented the future and modern technology. The torchbearer gripped the torch at the junction of both the aged and polished silver, during which their hand represented a bridge from the past to the present. The two silver sections also mirrored the blue/purple colors of the Fire and Ice theme. It bears the Salt Lake City 2002 paralympic logo, the motto of the games on the silver bottom, Mind, Body and Soul, the Roman numbers for the number 8, VIII and the name of the Paralympic Games, Paralympic Winter Games Salt Lake City 2002 with the Paralympic taegeuks in the middle.	Axiom Design	Coleman Company	83.5	13.00			
2006	Turin, Italy	A ski pole, alpenstock and a mountain peak. The 12 holes represents the Mole Antonelliana. It features the Torino 2006 Paralympic logo. The torch was criticized for being too heavy.	Pininfarina	Pininfarina	76.5	18.50			
2010	Vancouver, Canada	A grey curved cloud and the mountains surrounding Vancouver. It bears the red maple leaf in front and the motto of the games at the back, With glowing hearts/Des plus brillants exploits. A grey version of the torch is for the Paralympic torch. The torch also represents the souls of the host city, host province and the host country.	Leo Obstbaum	Bombardier Inc.	94.5	66.0			
2014	Sochi, Russia	A feather of a firebird. Silver in the design represented ice while the Sky Blue symbolizes the strength and spirit of the Paralympic Movement, the water kindling in the sea that surround the host city and the harmony, commitment and energy of the Paralympic athletes. After the torch relays, many torchbearers complained about their weight – the torches weighed more than two kilograms.	A team of famous Russian designers and engineers	Variant-999	95.0	18.0			
2018	Pyeongchang, South Korea	The torch is exactly 700 mm in length, representing the altitude of Pyeongchang, which is 700 meters above sea level. The white and bronze tones of the torch mirror the main colours of the torch relay, while the five-pronged shape of the flame is based on the Korean symbol for the host city, which is also engraved around the bottom half and top of the torch. The color white also drew its cues from white porcelain, and also from snow and ice, two major symbols of the Winter Paralympics. The five prongs form the symbol of the city, with the five-angled shape in the middle of the cap and the pentagon at the bottom representing the spirit of sports, which connects races, nations, religions, genders, cultures, as well as the five continents around the world. It will enable one part of the flame to be burning at all times, due to it being sheltered from the South Korea's strong wind and heavy snow, with an air tunnel also included to provide more oxygen to keep the flame lit. Both versions have the motto of the 2018 Paralympic Games (Passion Connected) at the bottom. The Paralympic version is bronze instead of gold and has Korean and Braille of the motto at the bottom.	Young Se Kim	Korea Explosive Co. Ltd (Hanwha Corp)	70.0				
2022	Beijing, China	Like the Olympic torch, it also takes inspiration from the Beijing 2008 torch as the symbolization of Beijing hosting both the Summer and Winter Paralympics, the torch features patterns of clouds and snowflakes painted from the bottom up to the flame. The torch resembles two overlapping, fluttering ribbons. The gold represents the flame and the white represents ice.The Paralympic torch version is gold as main colour, instead of red and has Braille of the name of the Winter Paralympics at the bottom. When a torchbearer passes the flame to another, it is locked to represent mutual understanding and respect between different cultures.	Li Janye	Vatti Corporation Ltd					
2026	Milan and Cortina d'Ampezzo, Italy	Named "Essential", the bronze torch is made primarily of recycled materials, including an alloy of aluminium and bronze. The torches are designed to be refilled up to ten times, using a fuel made from renewable materials. It was inspired by the design of the 1964 and 1972 torches.	Studio Carlo Ratti Associati	Cavagna Group	TBA	1,700 (1,060 excluding fuel canister)	c. 1500		

== Summer Youth Olympic torch designs ==
Games	Host	Design	Designer(s)	Manufacturer	Length (cm)	Weight (g)	Numbers produced	Image	Ref
2010	Singapore	Red on the top of the torch represented youths' passion and "burning desire to learn and excel, blazing the trail in life" (Blazing the Trail was the tagline of the games). White represents the sky. Water in the bottom represented Singapore, which is an island country surrounded entirely by water bodies and which had its origins as a seaport; it also reflected the "vibrant and dynamic nature" of the city-state.		Vatti Corporation Ltd	60	560	2,400		
2014	Nanjing, China	Nicknamed the Door of Happiness. The main body of the torch is covered in the metallic luster. And the torch is extremely light. The silver-colored part is designed into the shape of letter “n”, which is the initial of the city's name, Nanjing, and is also in the shape of the city gate of the Ming Dynasty, symbolizing Nanjing's hope to present its grandeur and brilliance to the world through the games. The blue part represents the Yangtze River, the water of which passes through the gate. The gray strips at the bottom of the torch are the symbol of ripples, rendering the torch more dynamic.	Ji Ziyi	Vatti Corporation Ltd	50	560	2,400		
2018	Buenos Aires, Argentina	According to the organizing committee, the torch is dressed in the miscellanies of the Buenos Aires 2018 emblem, inspired by the corners, icons, neighborhoods and culture of the city of Buenos Aires. In the seed of the logo burn three flames that, interlaced, give life to the Olympic flame of Youth, three, like the Olympic values of friendship, respect and excellence.		Vatti Corporation Ltd	60	560			

== Winter Youth Olympic torch designs ==
Games	Host	Design	Designer(s)	Manufacturer	Length (cm)	Weight (g)	Numbers produced	Image	Ref
2012	Innsbruck, Austria	White represents snow and world peace. The pixels represents the soul of the countries, athletes and the people. The colors of the pixels represents each colors from the flags of the NOCs' countries.		Vatti Corporation Ltd	60	560	2,012		
2016	Lillehammer, Norway	The blue triangles represents the ice and white represents snow.		Vatti Corporation Ltd	60	560			
2020	Lausanne, Switzerland	The torch features a blue and pink flame.		Vatti Corporation Ltd	60	560			
2024	Gangwon, South Korea	The torch is white on the top and yellow on the bottom.		Vatti Corporation Ltd					

== Footnotes ==
Notes
