= Tokujin Yoshioka =

Japanese artist and designer

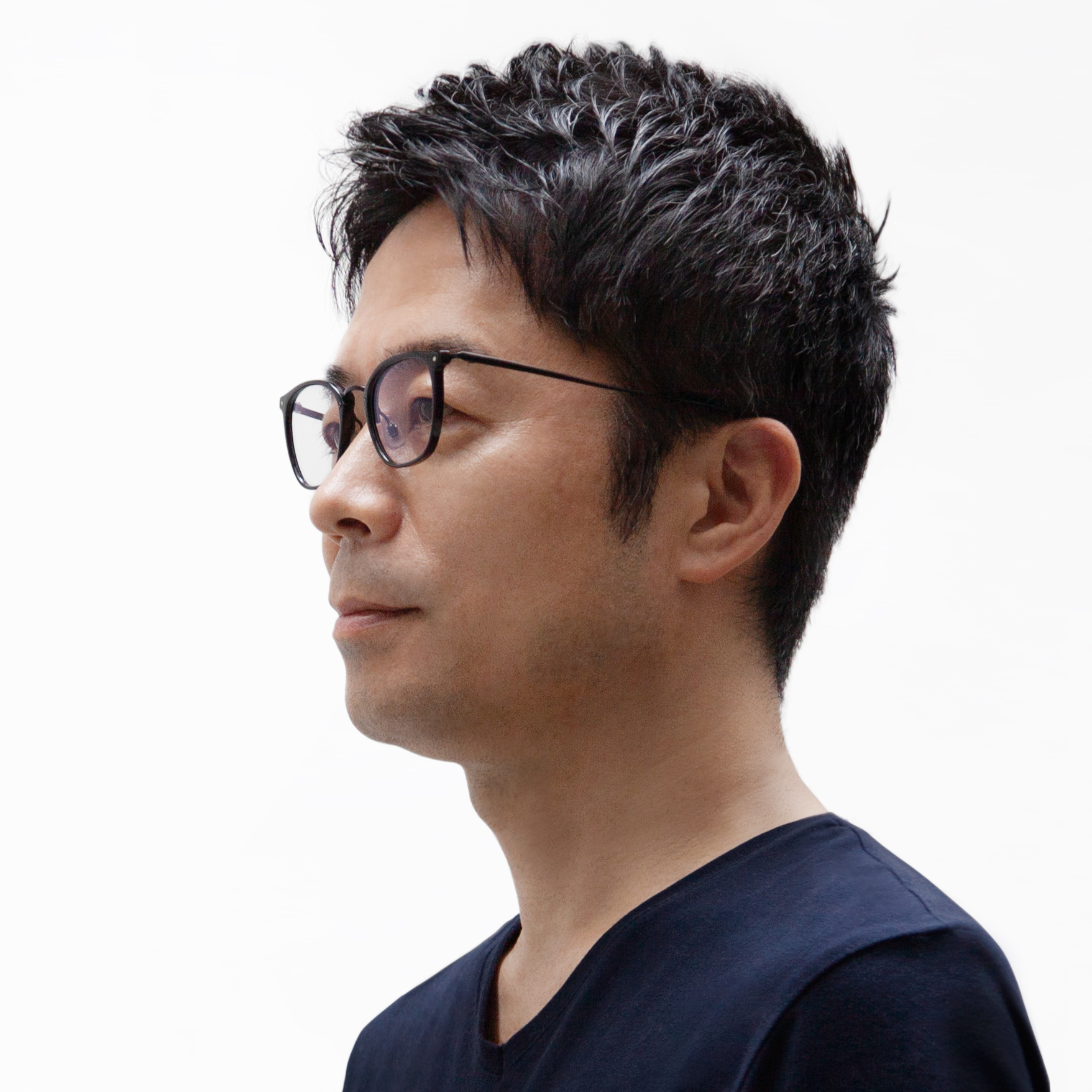
- Tokujin Yoshioka
- Born: January 20, 1967 (age 59); Saga Prefecture, Japan
- Known for: Design, contemporary art
- Website: www.tokujin.com

Tokujin Yoshioka (吉岡徳仁, Yoshioka Tokujin; born January 20, 1967) is a Japanese designer and artist active in the fields of design, architecture and contemporary art. Some of his works are part of permanent collections in the Museum of Modern Art (MoMA), the Centre Pompidou in Paris, and the Victoria and Albert Museum in London. In 2007, he was named by Newsweek one of the 100 most respected Japanese in the world.

== Biography ==
Tokujin Yoshioka was born in Saga Prefecture, Japan in 1967. After graduating from the Kuwasawa Design School in Tokyo in 1988, he studied under the designers Shiro Kuramata and Issey Miyake.

He established his own shop, Tokujin Yoshioka Inc., in 2000. He has designed for Issey Miyake and other global companies such as Cartier, Swarovski, Louis Vuitton, Hermès, Toyota, and Lexus, and has been announcing new works at Salone del Mobile Milano(world's largest international furniture exhibition) in collaboration with Italian furniture brands, including Kartell, Moroso, Glas Italia and Driade.

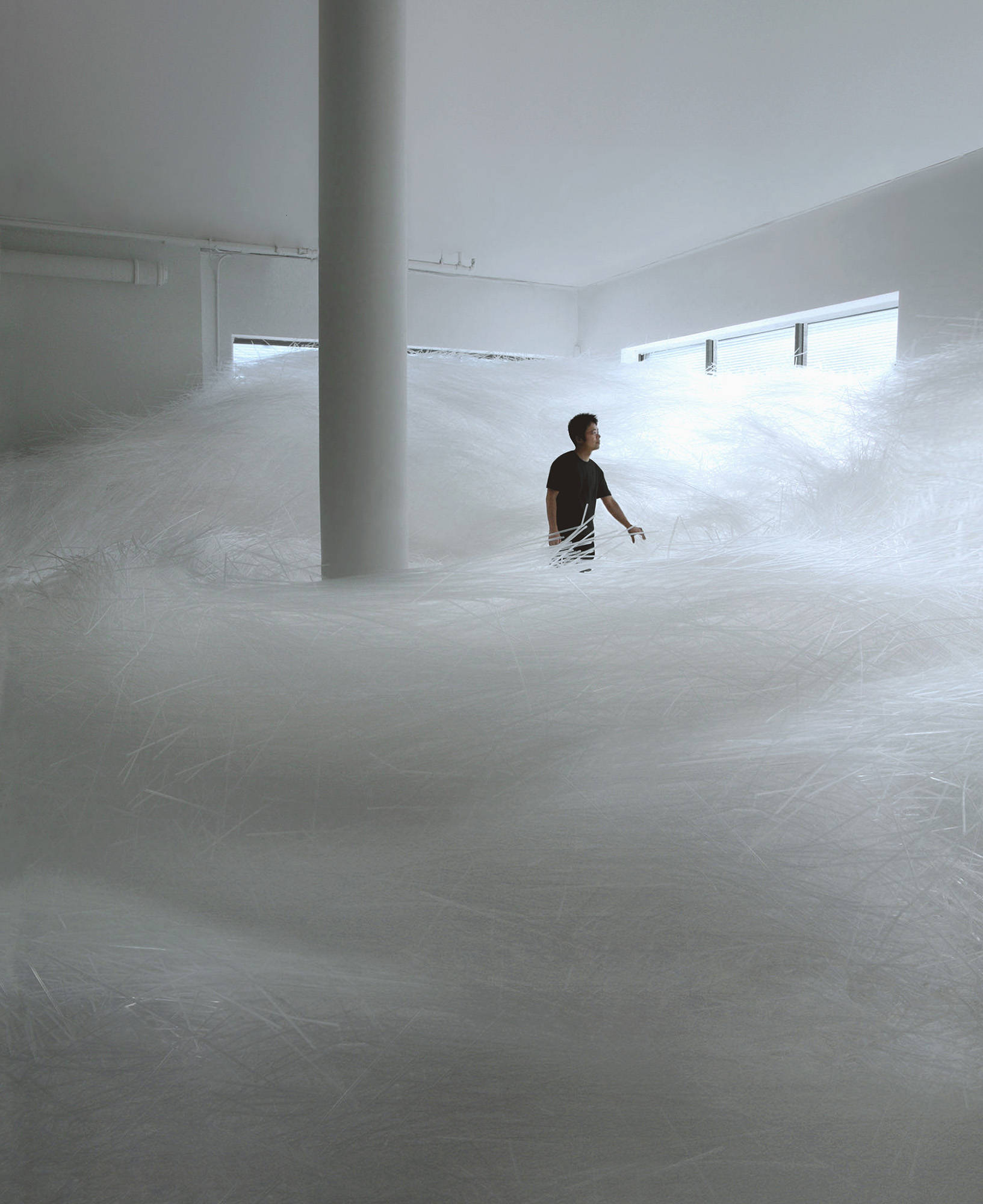
Tornado / Design Miami 2007

== Style ==
Active in the fields of design, architecture and contemporary art, he creates works under the theme of light and nature, which also reflect the Japanese idea of beauty. By using immaterial elements, such as light, he creates unique expressions that go beyond the concept of shape.

== Representative works ==
=== Chairs created out of natural structure, 2001 ===
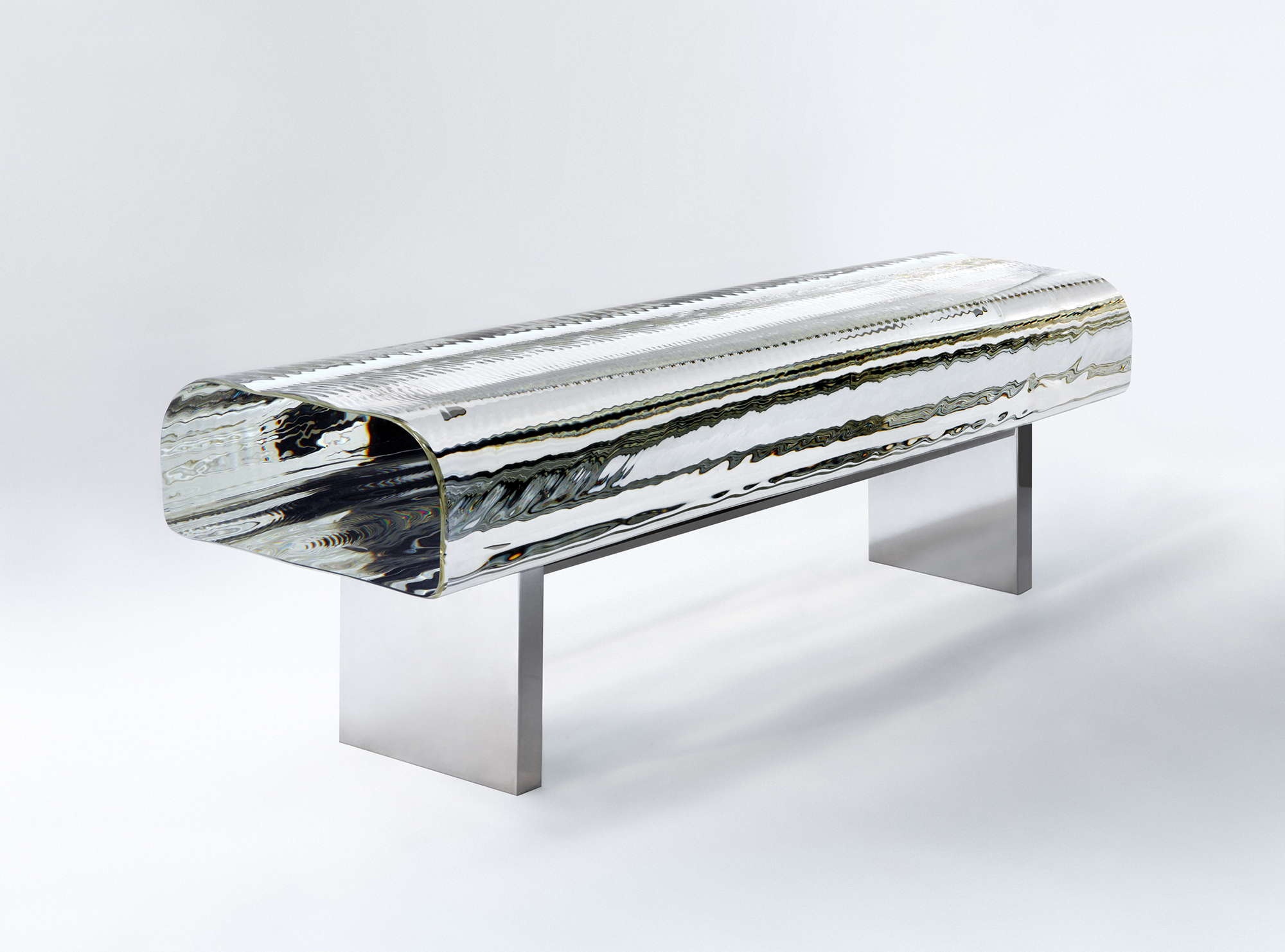
Water Block (2002)

Paper chair 'Honey-pop' (2000) is a chair that changes shape from plane to three-dimensional. By spreading open a 1 cm layer of 120 layers of thin paper, a honeycomb structure is born, and only when a person sits on it, the shape is fixed and the work is completed. 'PANE chair' (2006) is made like fibrous structure of plants, creating a structure with thin fibers of 1mm intertwining. During the production process, a block made of fibers is placed in a paper duct and put in oven as if baking a bread and by adding heat, the form of chair is shape memorized and completed. Chair made of natural crystals 'Venus – Natural crystal chair' (2008) is a work that is transformed into a chair by growing natural crystals in a water tank to create crystalline structure.

=== Glass projects, 2002 ===
Has announced starting with glass bench 'Water Block' (2002), 'Transparent Japanese House '(2002), 'Chair that disappears in the rain' (2002), 'Waterfall' (2005–2006), 'Glass Tea House – KOU-AN' (2011), 'Water Block – PRISM' (2017). Glass bench 'Water Block' has been exhibited at Musée d'Orsay in Paris since 2011.

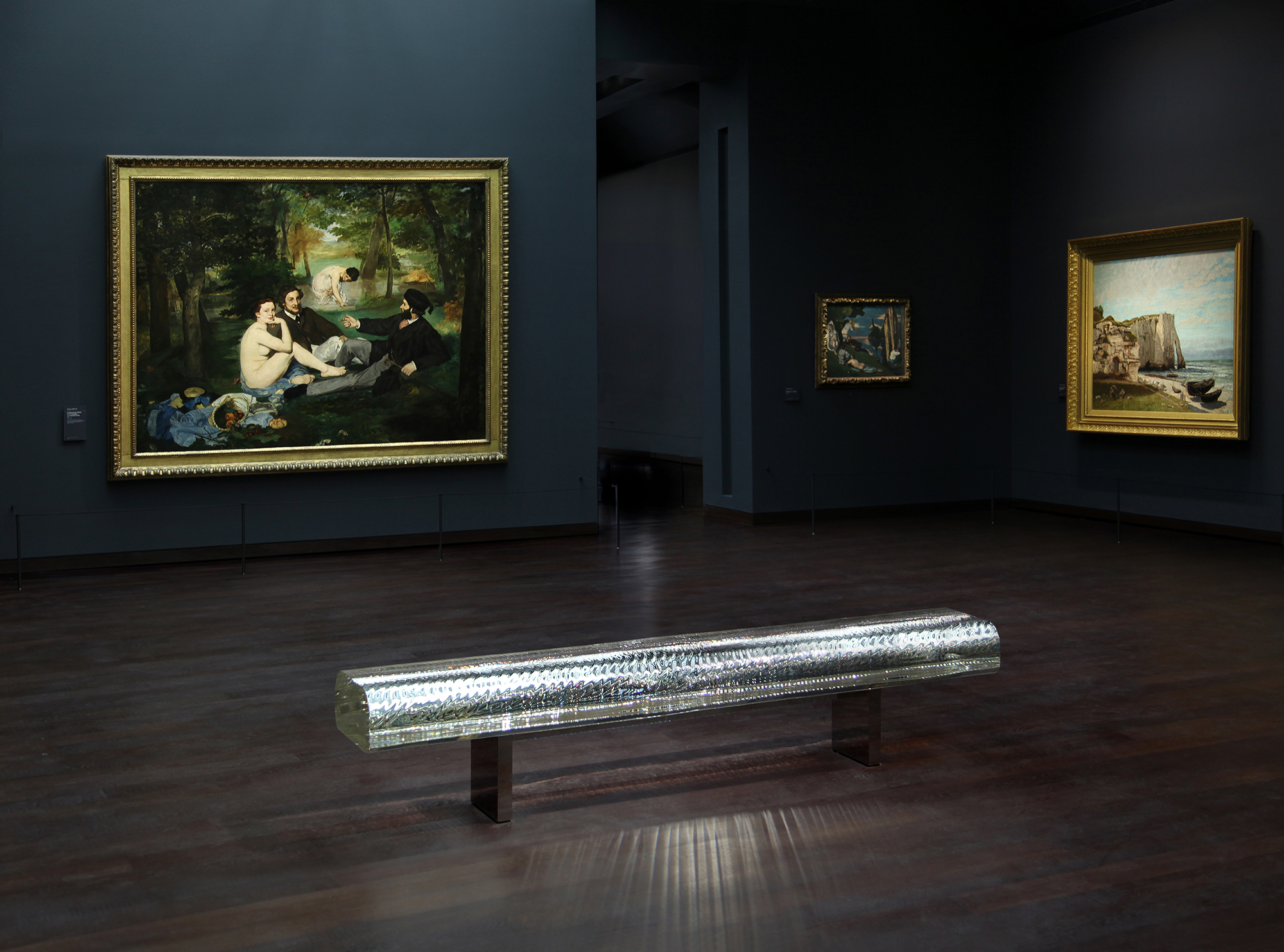
Musée d'Orsay, Paris, 2011 Water Block (2002)

=== Musée d' Orsay, Paris, 2011 ===
At Musée d' Orsay in Paris, participated in renewal project of the Impressionists Gallery. Together with works of representative Impressionists, Édouard Manet, Edgar Degas, Claude Monet, Paul Cézanne, Pierre-Auguste Renoir, 10 'Water Blocks', glass bench is permanently displayed. It blend in with light painted by the Impressionists painters, creating a space that starts a new conversation between history and contemporary.

=== Crystallized Project, 2008 ===
Natural crystal chair 'VENUS – Natural crystal chair' (2008) is a work in which in a water tank, natural crystals are grown to form crystalline structures and transformed into a chair. One music piece creates one painting. With crystal paintings, 'Swan Lake', 'Destiny' and 'Moonlight', music is played during the growth process of crystals and is completed when forms of crystals are changed with the vibrations of sound. 'Rose' is a sculpture crystallizing colour pigments of rose, expressing the energy of life.

=== Rainbow Church, 2010, 2013 ===
Architecture created using more than 500 crystal prisms, the 'Rainbow Church ', focuses on human sense of light perception, and is a work that is completed when a person experiences light. It is an architecture that expresses light itself, filling the space with rainbow colors as light is dispersed by prisms.

=== Glass Tea House – KOU-AN, 2011 ===
At the 54th Venezia Biennnale International Art Exhibition, Glasstress 2011, the collateral event of the 54th La Biennale di Vennezia, the glass tea house – KOU-AN was presented as an architectural project and in 2015, was built on the stage (observation deck) of Shogun-zuka, a mound of Shogun, Seiryu-den, which is a precinct of Tendai Sect Shoren-in Temple. Ao (Blue) Fudo Myo-o statue, a national treasure, one of the three great Fudo, god of fire, is dedicated to Seiryu-den. From its 220 meters altitude big stage, you can enjoy a panoramic view over Kyoto city below. In the year 794, Emperor Kanmu visited this place and appreciating its basin formation (landscape) was convinced that Kyoto is the most suitable place to be designated a capital, initiating construction of the ancient capital city. So, it is said that this is the original point where ancient capital city of Kyoto, a city that symbolizes Japanese culture began.

=== Tokyo 2020 Olympic and Paralympic Torch ===
On March 20, 2019, the torch for the 2020 Summer Olympics in Tokyo was unveiled. The torch was designed by Yoshioka to be built in the shape of an iconic Japanese cherry blossom (sakura) flower using the aluminium extrusion manufacturing technology employed to produce Shinkansen bullet trains. He also designed the Paralympic torch for the 2020 Summer Paralympics.

== Representative works ==
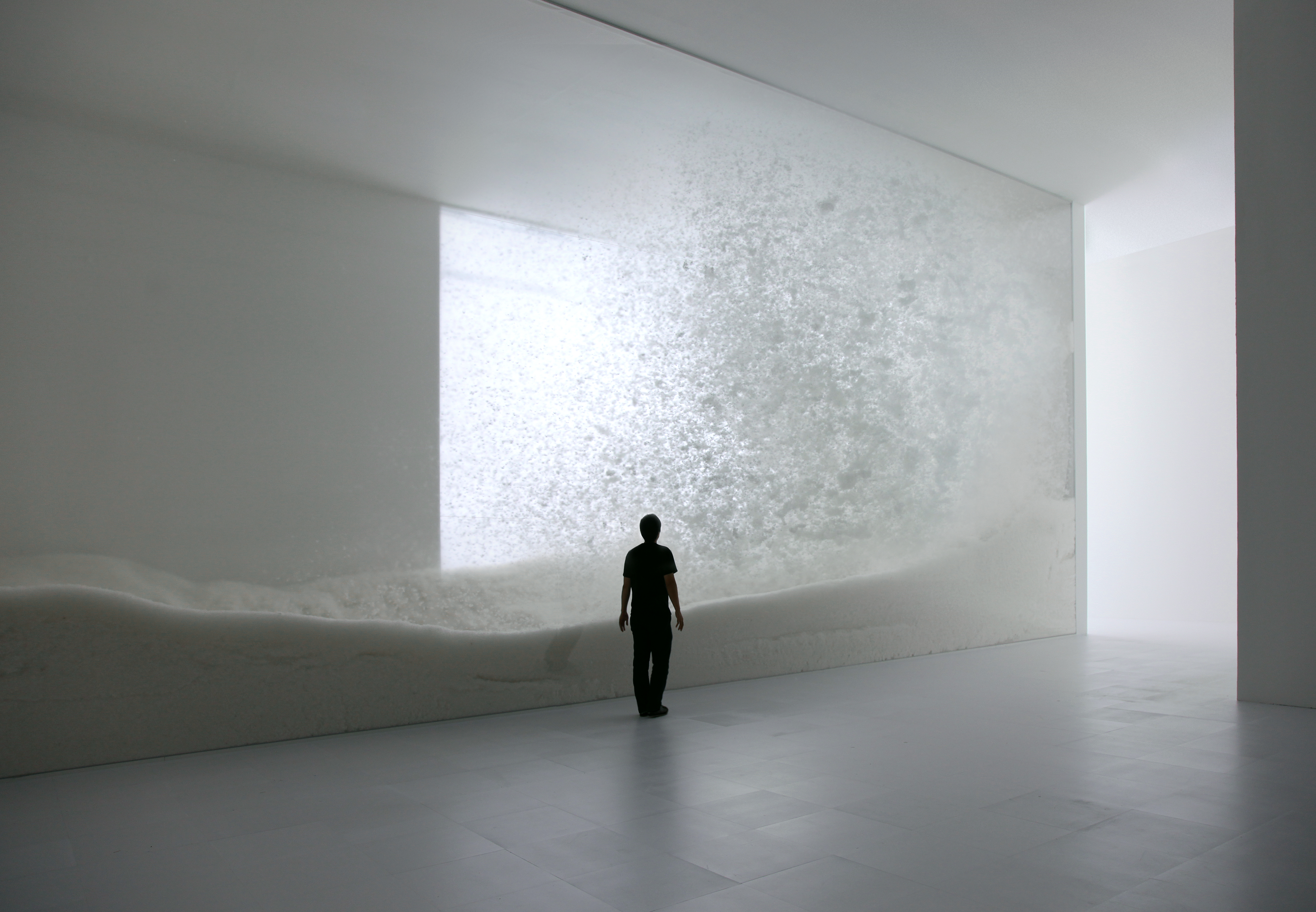
Snow / Mori Art Museum, Tokyo 2010 (1997)

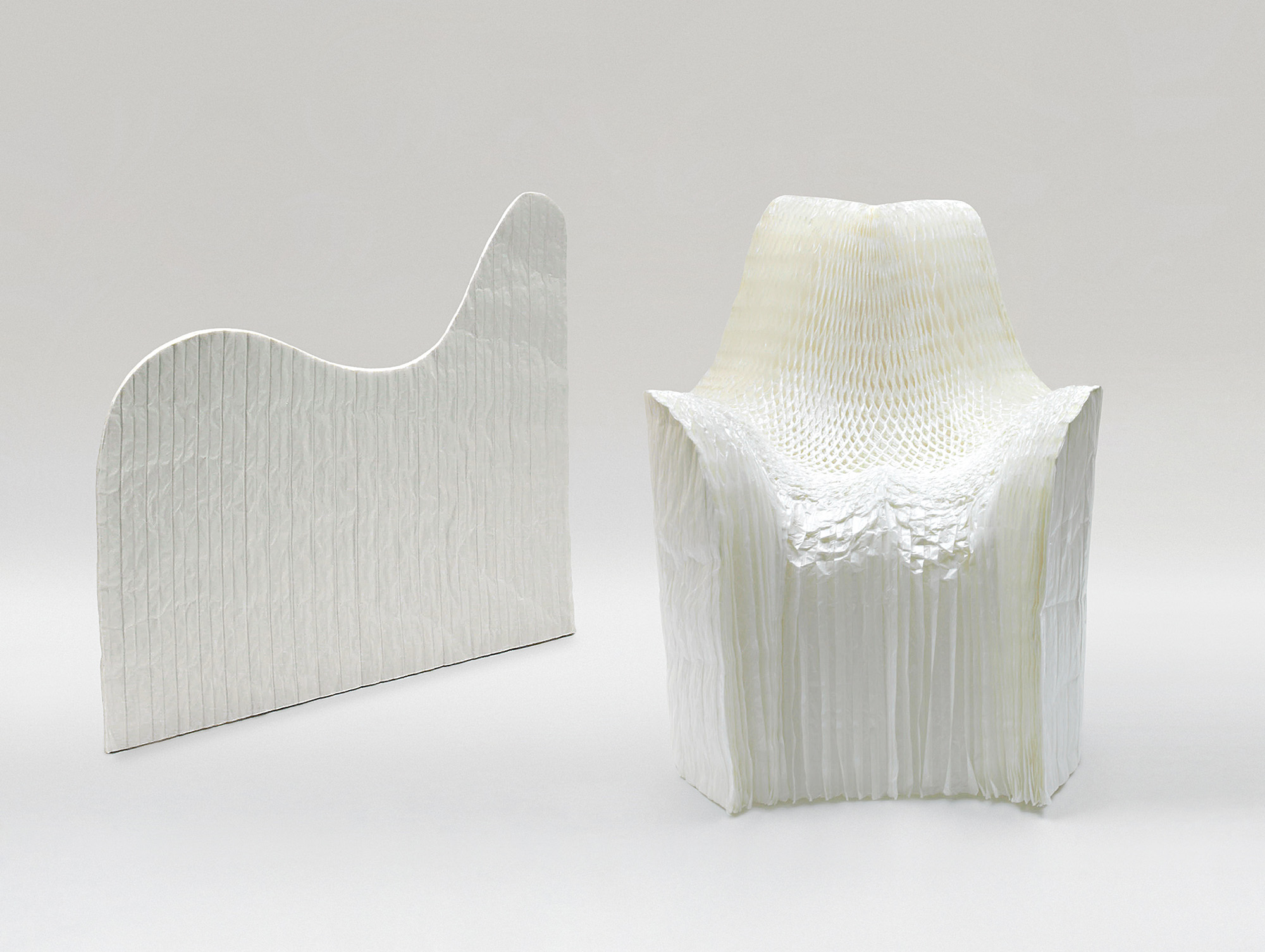
Honey-pop (2001)

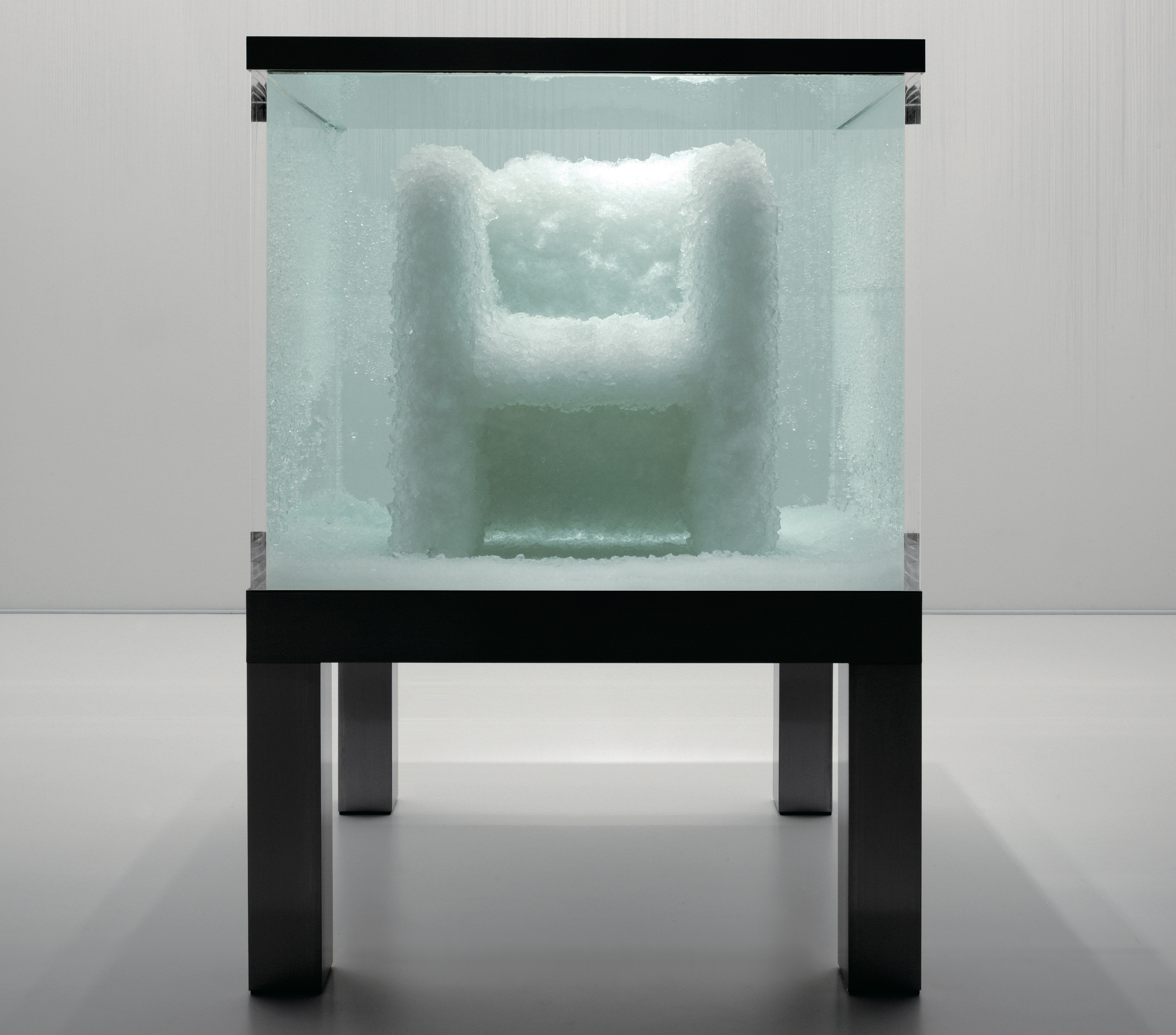
VENUS – Natural crystal chair (2007)

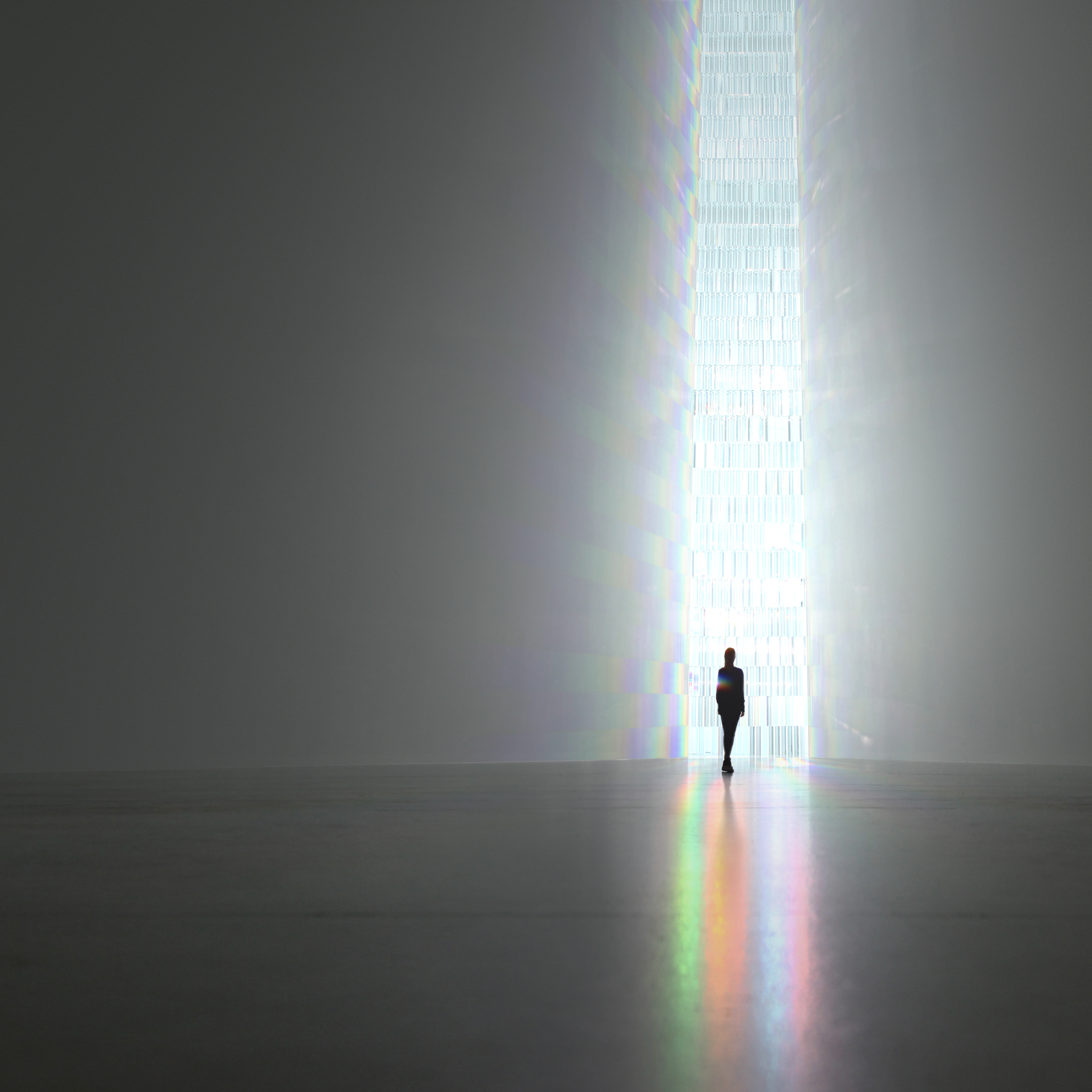
Rainbow Church (2010) at the Museum of Contemporary Art Tokyo in 2013

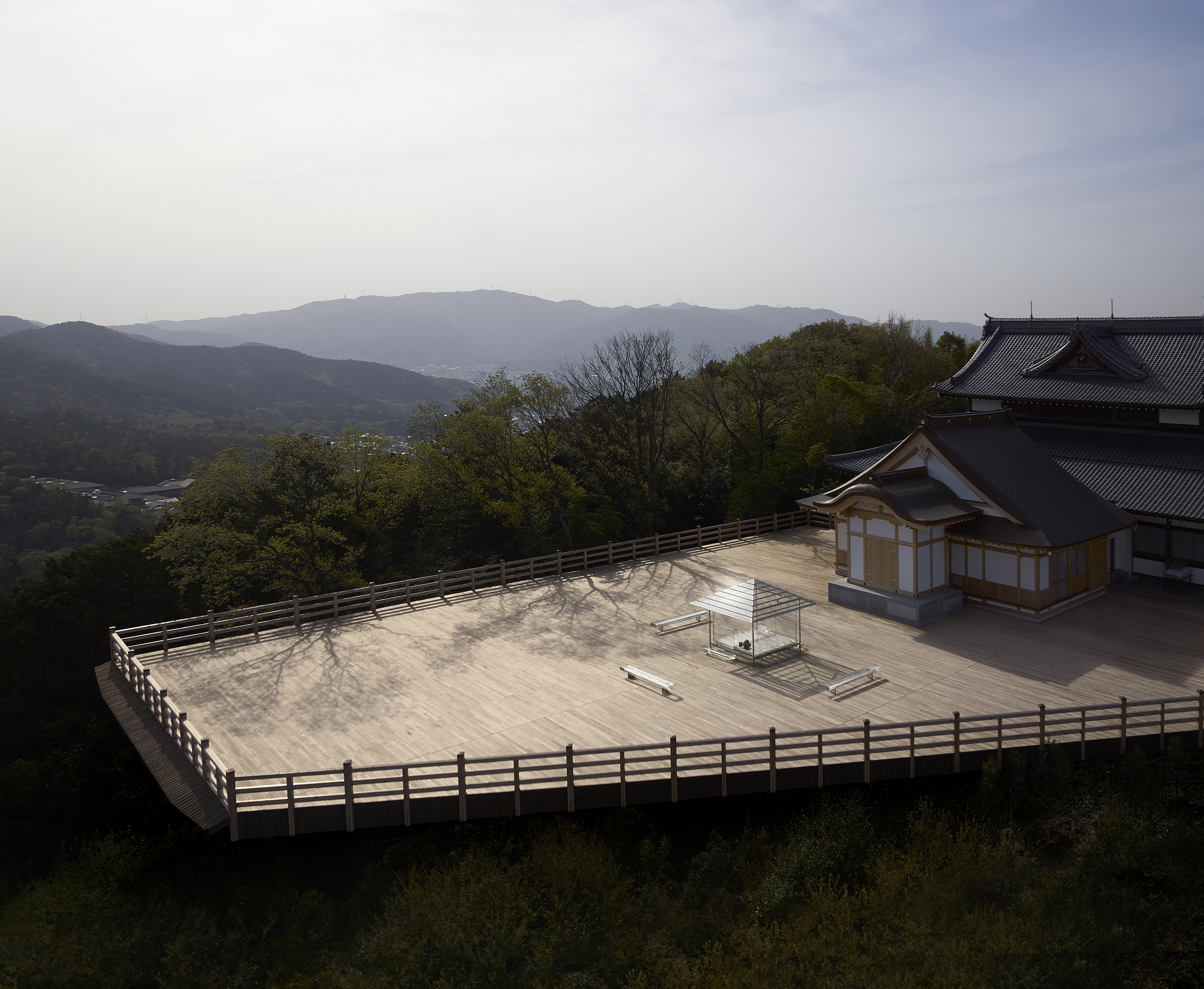
Glass Tea House – KOU-AN (2011) at Shogunzuka Seiryu-den, Kyoto 2015–2017

- 2000 Tokujin Yoshioka Design
- 2000 TōFU / Yamagiwa
- 2001 Honey-pop
- 2001 THINK ZONE / Mori building
- 2002 Water Block
- 2002 Transparent Japanese House
- 2002–2003 Chair that disappears in the rain
- 2004 Souffle / Maison Hermès
- 2005–2007 MEDIA SKIN / au design project KDDI
- 2006 The Gate – Tokujin Yoshioka x Lexus
- 2006 Waterfall
- 2006 PANE chair
- 2007 Tornado / Design Miami
- 2007 Rainbow chair
- 2007 Tear Drop / Yamagiwa
- 2006–2008 Swarovski Ginza flagship store
- 2007–2008 VENUS – Natural crystal chair
- 2007–2008 Crystallized Painting – Moonlight / Destiny / Unfinished
- 2008 Eternal / Swarovski Crystal Palace
- 2009 Moon Fragment / Cartier
- 2009 Lake of Shimmer / Basel World / Swarovski
- 2010 X-RAY / KDDI iida
- 2010 Stellar / Swarovski Crystal Palace
- 2010–2013 Rainbow Church
- 2010 Snow
- 2011 Glass Tea House – KOU-AN / The 54th La Biennale di Venezia – Glasstress 2011
- 2011 The Impressionist Gallery renewal project / Musée d'Orsay
- 2013 Crystallized Painting – Swan Lake, Spider's Thread, Rose
- 2013 Wings of Sparkle / Basel World / Swarovski
- 2014 Cartier Time Art – Mechanic of Passion / Power Station of Art
- 2015–2017 Glass Tea House – KOU-AN / Shogunzuka Seiryu-den, Kyoto
- 2017 Spectrum
- 2017 Water Block – PRISM
- 2017 S.F chair
- 2019 Tokyo 2020 Olympic and Paralympic Torch
- 2020 Crystal of Light / Tokyo Metro Ginza Station Public art
- 2022 Star / Tokyo Midtown Yaesu Public art

== Major exhibitions ==
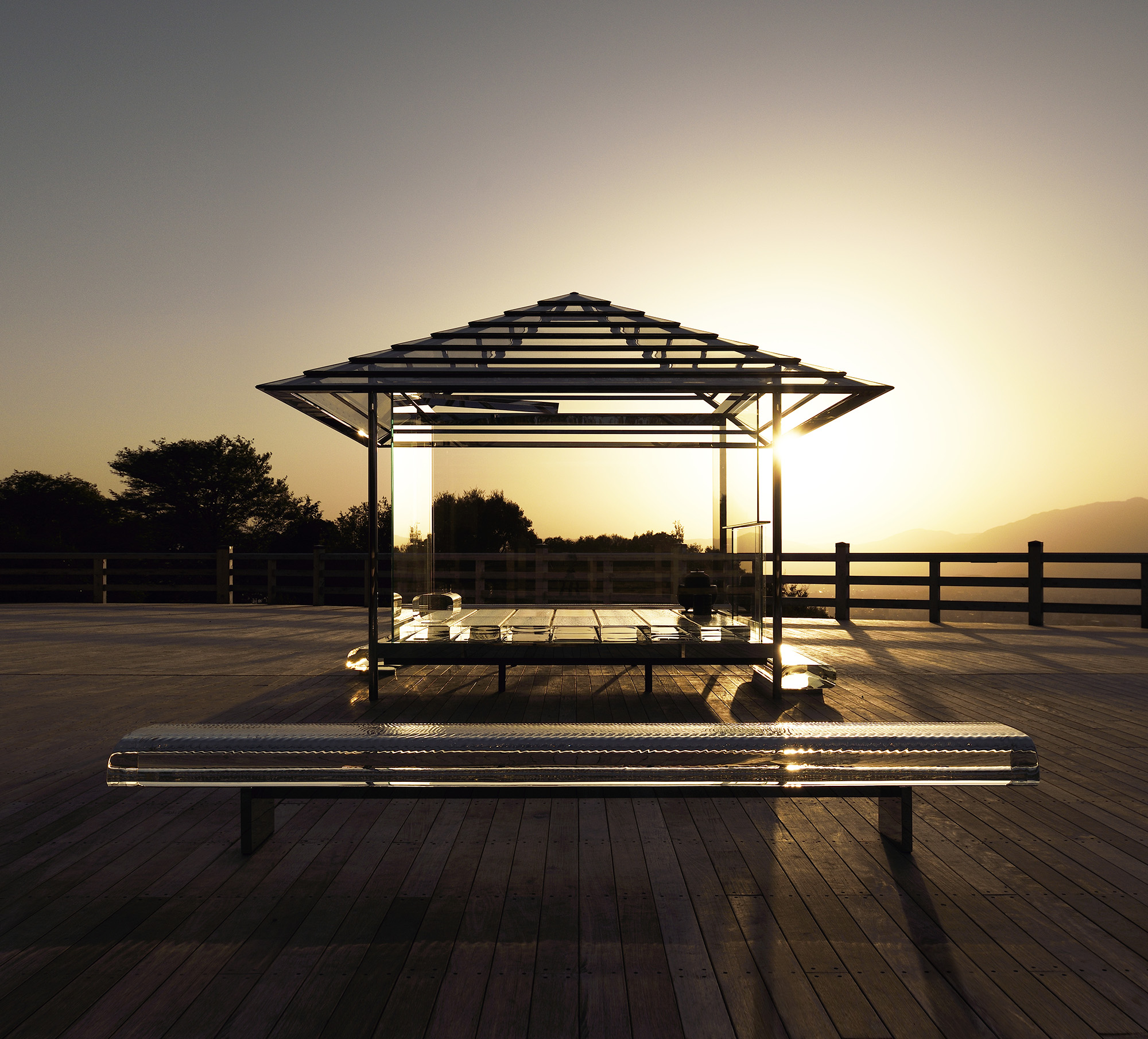
Glass Tea House – KOU-AN (2011) at Shogunzuka Seiryu-den, Kyoto 2015–2017

- 1998–2000 ISSEY MIYAKE Making Things / Fondation Cartier pour l'Art Contemporain, Ace Gallery NY, Museum of Contemporary Art Tokyo
- 2002 Tokujin Yoshioka Honey-pop, MDS/G
- 2005–2006 Tokujin Yoshioka x Lexus / Museum of Permanente
- 2005 Stardust / Swarovski Crystal Palace / Milano Design Week
- 2007 Tornado / Design Miami / Designer of the year 2007
- 2007 Tokujin x Moroso / Milano Design Week
- 2009 Story of ... Memories of Cartier Creations / Tokyo National Museum Hyokeikan
- 2008 Second Nature / 21_21 DESIGN SIGHT
- 2010 Sensing Nature / Mori Art Museum
- 2010 The Invisibles Snowflake / Kartell Gallery
- 2011 TWILIGHT – Tokujin Yoshioka / Moroso / Milano Design Week
- 2011 Tokujin Yoshioka : Waterfall / Sharman Contemporary Art Foundation
- 2011 Glass Tea House – KOU-AN / The 54th La Biennale di Venezia – Glasstress 2011
- 2011–2012, 2014 Cartier Time Art / Bellerive Museum, Artscience Museum, Power Station of Art
- 2012 TOKUJIN YOSHIOKA 2012 CREATOR OF THE YEAR / Maison & Objet
- 2013 TOKUJIN YOSHIOKA_Crystallize / Museum of Contemporary Art Tokyo
- 2014 La Biennale di Venezia – The 14th International Architecture Exhibition 2014
- 2015 Make Yourself Comfortable / Chatsworth House
- 2015 TOKUJIN YOSHIOKA_TORNADO / Saga Prefectural Art Museum
- 2015–2017 Glass Tea House – KOU-AN / Shogunzuka Seiryu-den, Kyoto
- 2017 TOKUJIN YOSHIOKA_SPECTRUM / Shiseido Gallery
- 2017 TOKUJIN YOSHIOKA x LG : S.F / Milano Design Week

== Permanent collections ==
- Museum of Modern Art, New York
- Centre Pompidou, Paris
- Musée d'Orsay, Paris
- Musée des Arts Décoratifs, Paris
- Victoria and Albert Museum, London
- Cooper Hewitt, Smithsonian Design Museum
- Vitra Design Museum
- The Art Institute of Chicago
- San Francisco Museum of Modern Art
- Saint Louis Art Museum
- Montreal Museum of Fine Arts
- Museum of Contemporary Art Tokyo
- Israel Museum
- Leeum, Samsung Museum of Art

== Major awards ==
- 1997 JCD Design Award – Grand prize (Japan)
- 2000 I.D. Annual Design Review (USA)
- 2001 I.D. Annual Design Review (USA)
- 2001 A&W Award The Coming Designer for the Future (Germany)
- 2002 Mainichi Design Award 2001 (Japan)
- 2005 Talents du Luxe (France)
- 2007 The 57th Art Encouragement Prize for New Artist (Japan)
- 2007 Good Design Award – Gold prize (Japan)
- 2007 Design Miami – Designer of the Year 2007 (USA)
- 2008 Wallpaper Design Awards 2008 – Best furniture designer (UK)
- 2008 DFA Design for Asia Awards 2008 – Grand Award (Hong Kong)
- 2009 ELLE DECO International Design Awards – Designer of the Year 2009 (Italy)
- 2010 Fast Company – The 100 Most Creative People in Business 2010 (USA)
- 2010 TOKYO Design & Art ENVIRONMENTAL AWARDS – Artist of the Year (Japan)
- 2011 A&W Architektur & Wohnen – Designer of the Year 2011 (Germany)
- 2012 Maison & Objet – Creator of the Year 2012 (France)
- 2016 ELLE DECO International Design Awards (EDIDA) 2016 (Italy)
- 2017 Milano Design Award 2017 – Winner (Italy)

== Publications, collection of works ==
- 2001 Tokujin Design (gap / Japan)
- 2006 Tokujin Yoshioka Design (English edition, Japanese edition) (Phaidon / UK)
- 2008 Second Nature (Kyuryudo / Japan)
- 2009 Invisible Forms (Esquire Magazine / Japan)
- 2010 SENSING NATURE (Heibonsha / Japan)
- 2010 TOKUJIN YOSHIOKA (Rizzoli / USA)
- 2013 TOKUJIN YOSHIOKA_Crystallize (Seigensha / Japan)
- 2017 KOU-AN Glass Tea House (Kyuryudo / Japan)
