= STAR (sculpture) =

- STAR – Light for Peace
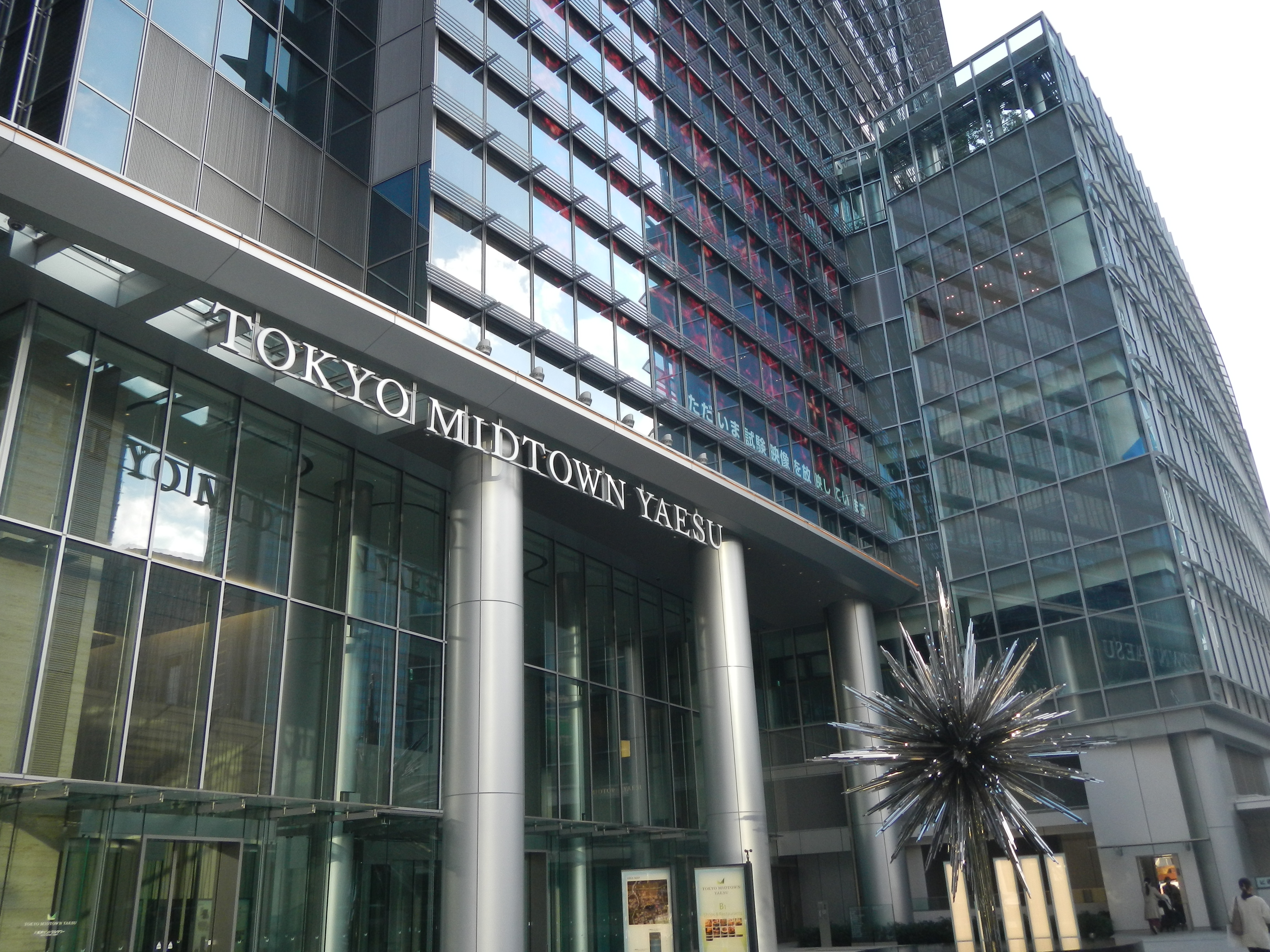
- STAR at the entrance of Tokyo Midtown Yaesu.
- Artist: Tokujin Yoshioka
- Year: 2022
- Medium: Stainless steel
- Subject: Stylized star
- Dimensions: 10 m (33 ft); 6.4 m diameter (21 ft)
- Location: Tokyo Midtown Yaesu, Tokyo; 35.67963°N 139.76865°E
- Website: tokujin.com/works/2022-star

Star sculpture (titled STAR or STAR - Light for Peace) is one of Tokujin Yoshioka's major public artworks, unveiled in September 2022 as a permanent installation at the entrance to Tokyo Midtown Yaesu, on the Yaesu side near Tokyo Station.

Standing approximately 10 meters tall, it consists of more than 2,000 octagonal rods made of mirrored stainless steel. These rods converge as if crystallizing, forming a dynamic "sculpture of light" that interacts with its environment. The reflective surfaces capture and scatter sunlight during the day, turn amber at sunset, and mirror the night sky after dark, creating ever-changing radiance that blends with the surroundings.
