= Yaechika Shopping Mall =

Shopping mall in Tokyo, Japan

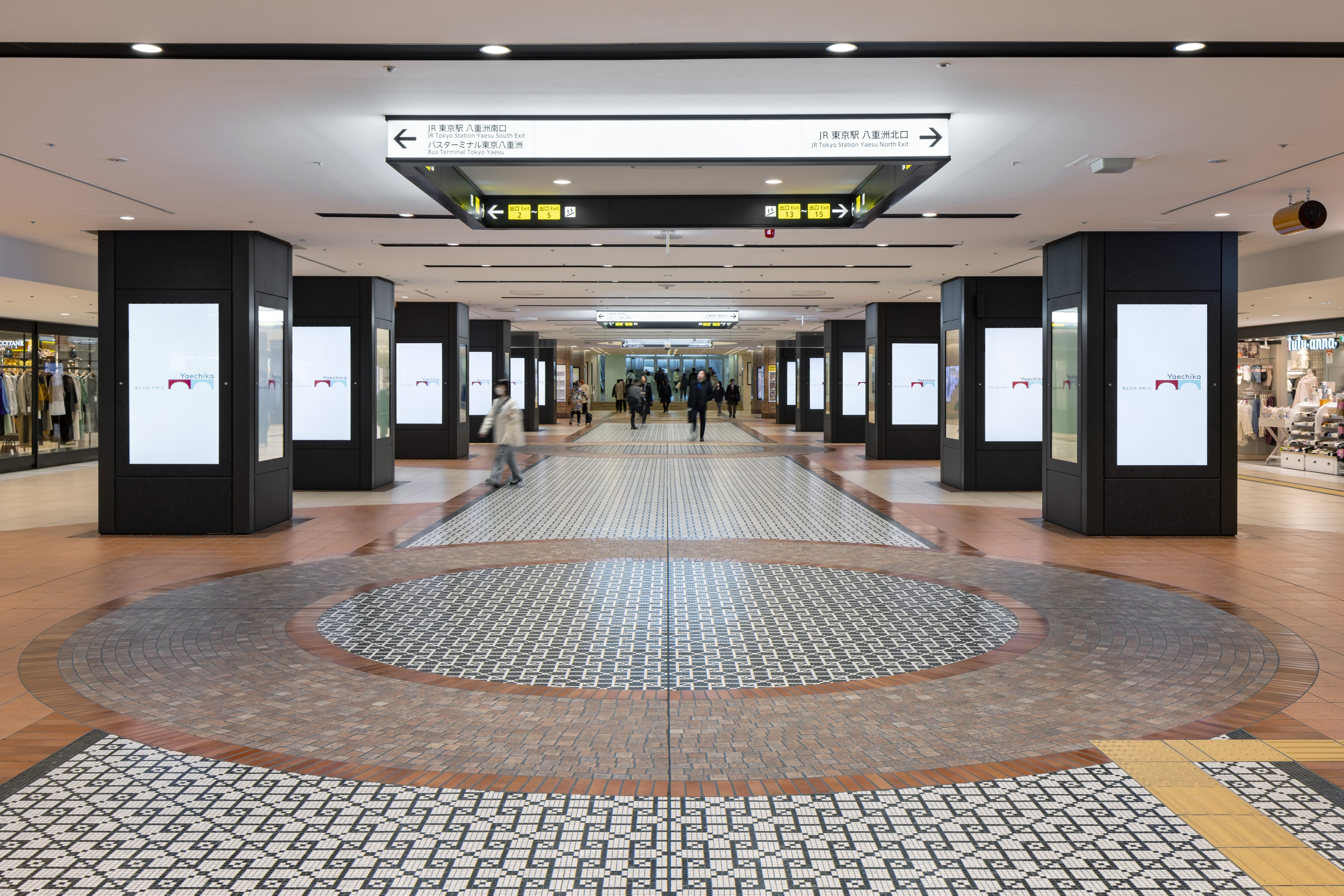
Yaechika Main Avenue in February 2024

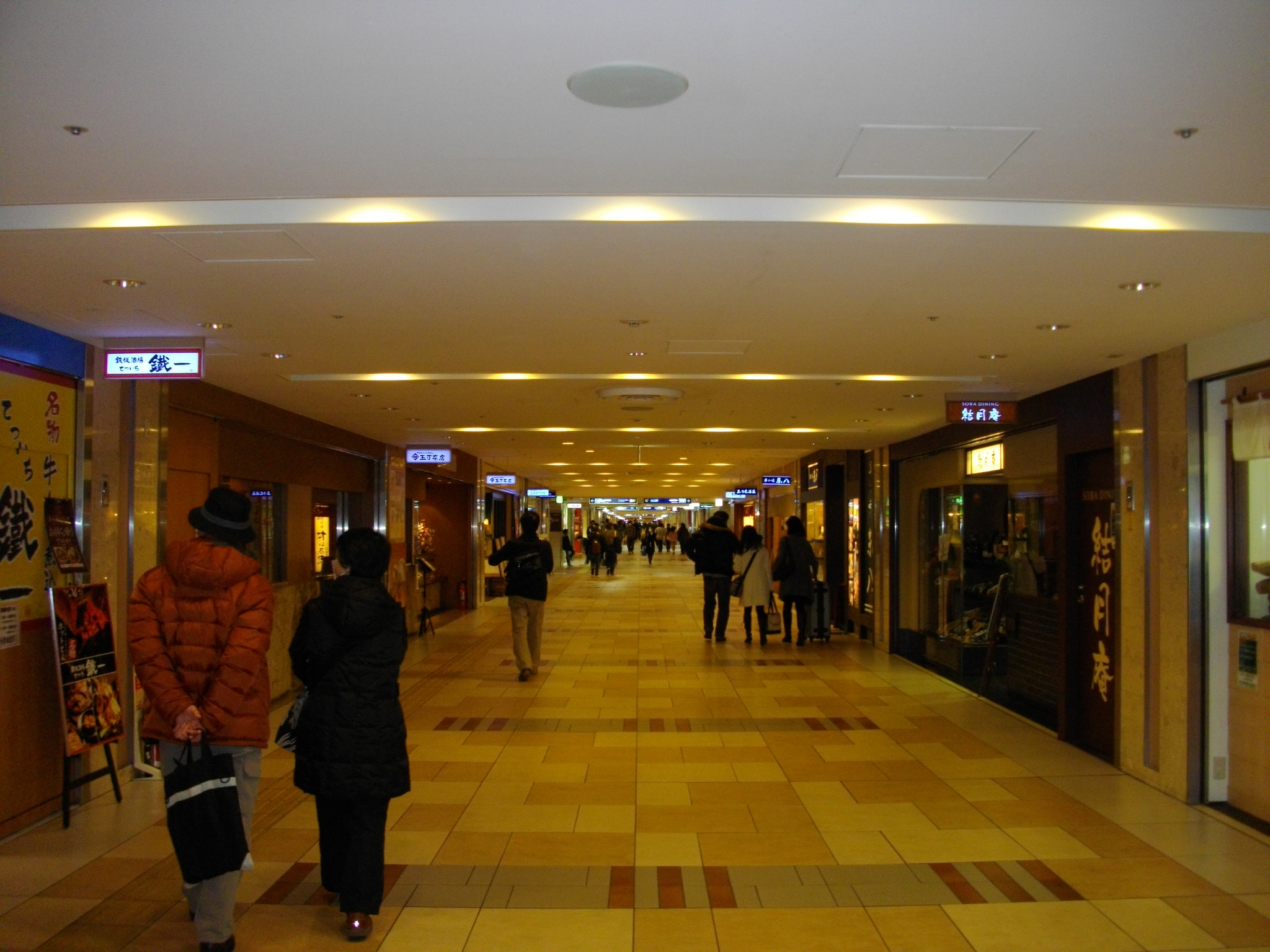
Yaechika Shopping Mall in March 2011

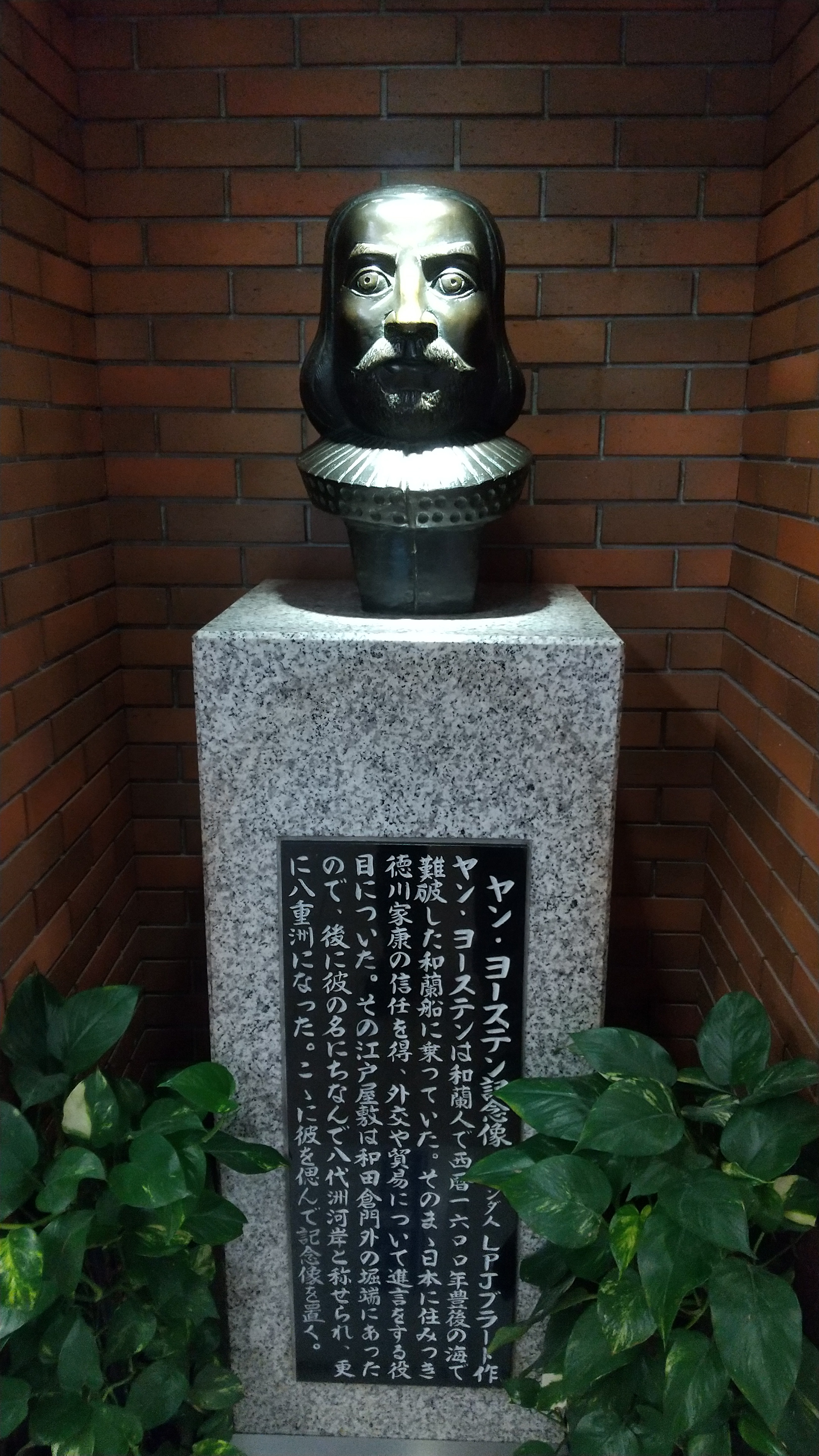
The Jan Joosten van Lodensteijn Memorial Statue in the Yaechika Shopping Mall in Tokyo Station.

Yaechika Shopping Mall, also known as Yaesu Chikagai or Yaesu Shopping Mall, is a large underground shopping mall located in Yaesu, Chūō, Tokyo, Japan.

Yaechika lies underneath Yaesu Avenue and Sotobori Dori. It is immediately adjacent to the Yaesu side of Tokyo Station, with direct connections into the basement level of the station.

The mall contains about 180 shops, including 60 restaurants and cafes.

== History ==
Yaechika was opened in stages between 1965 and 1973. Up until 2022, the mall was known as Yaesu Chikagai, but in September of that year a rebranding took place and the official name became Yaechika Shopping Mall.

== Nearby attractions ==
- Ramen Street
- Shangri-La Hotel, Tokyo
- Daimaru, Tokyo
- Tokyo Midtown Yaesu
