= Yaesu =

Town located in Chūō-ku, Tokyo

Coordinates: 35°40′48″N 139°46′11″E

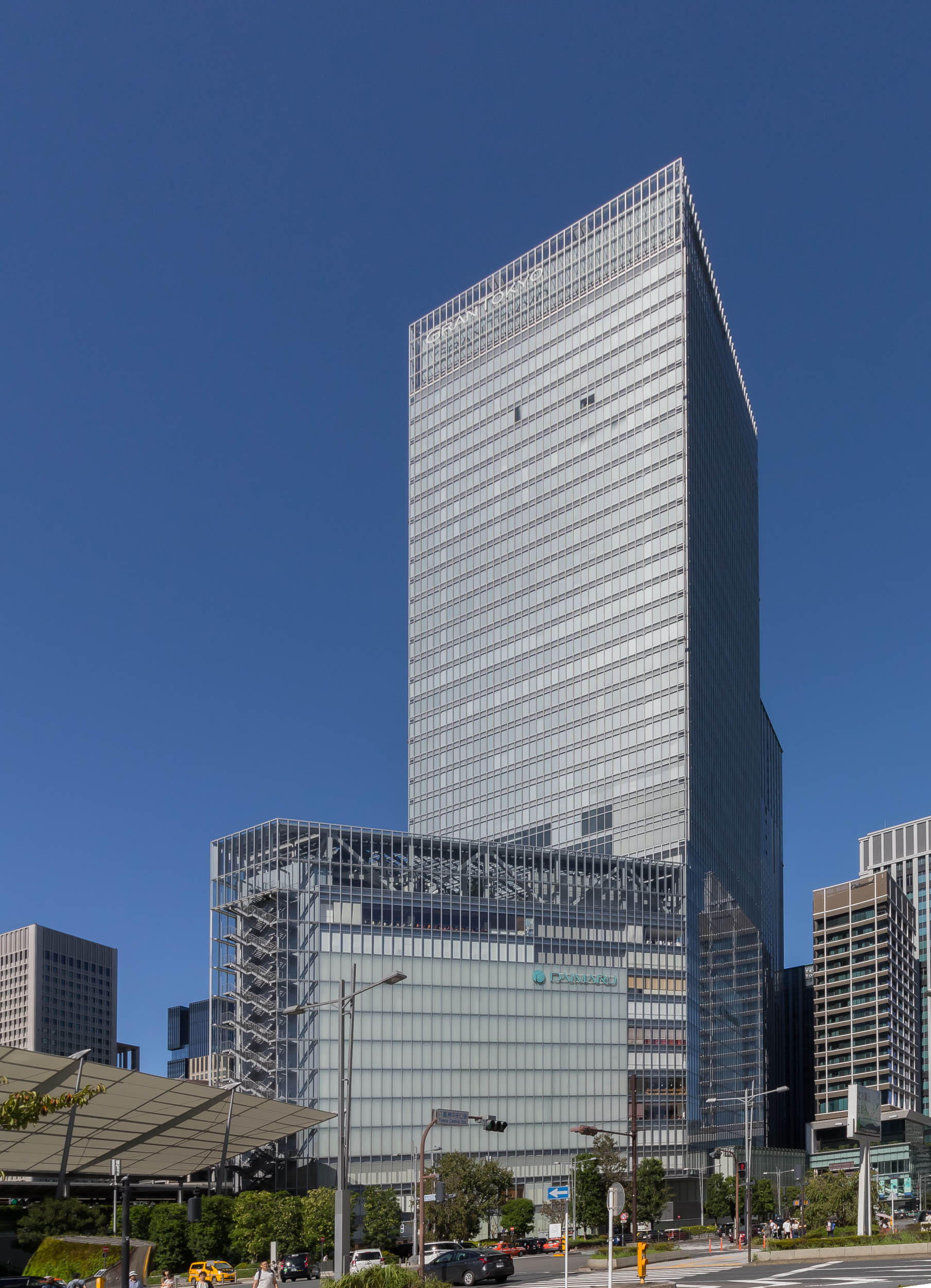
GranTokyo North Tower

Yaesu (八重洲) is a district in Chūō, Tokyo, Japan, located north of Ginza, west of Nihonbashi and Kyōbashi, and adjacent to the east side of Tokyo Station. The Yaesu exit of this station, which faces Nihonbashi, is a recent addition and primarily provides access to the Shinkansen platforms.

== History ==
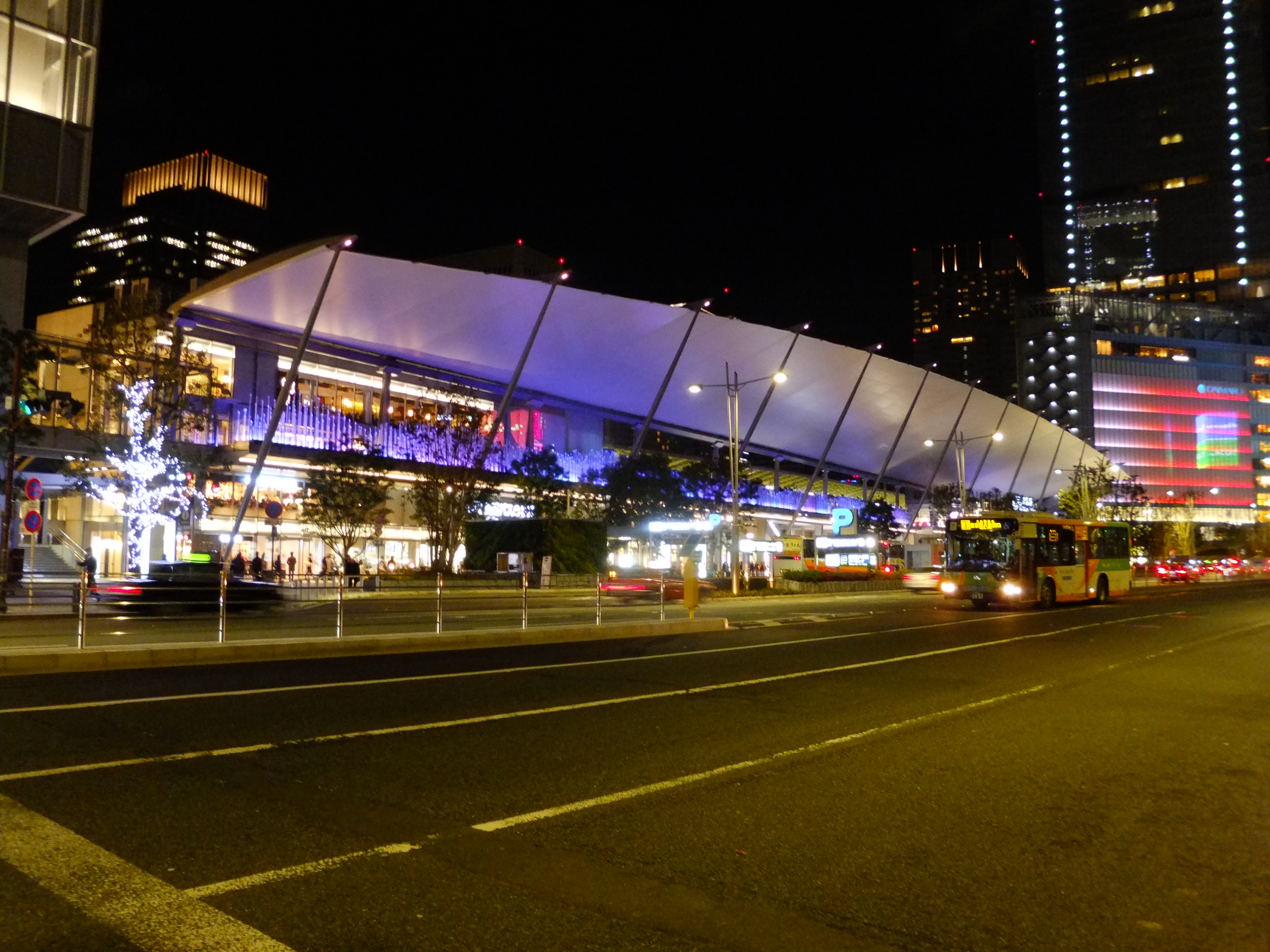
GranRoof

The area was named after the 17th century Dutch adventurer Jan Joosten van Lodensteijn, or simply Jan Joosten. For his services to Tokugawa Ieyasu he was granted a house in Edo (now Tokyo) in an area that came to be called "Yayosu Quay" after him — his name was pronounced yan yōsuten in Japanese (short version: Yayōsu (耶楊子)) — the Yaesu side of Tokyo Station is also named for him. Yaesu Avenue has a monument dedicated to Jan Joosten and his life after his arrival in Japan on De Liefde with his shipmate William Adams.

Ukiyo-e artist Andō Hiroshige was born in the Yayosu barracks in the Yaesu area in 1797.

== Places in Yaesu ==
- Tokyo Station
- Tokyo Midtown Yaesu
- Yaesu underground shopping promenade, which extends eastward from Tokyo Station down Yaesu Avenue

== Companies based in Yaesu ==
- Asahi Mutual Life Insurance Co
- J. Front Retailing, company that holds the stock in Daimaru and Matsuzakaya department-store chains
- The Sumitomo Marine & Fire Insurance Co.
- Yaesu, a manufacturer of communications equipment, was formerly located here.
- Astemo, Ltd. a global Tier-1 automotive and motorcycle components manufacturer.

== Railway and subway stations ==
- Kyōbashi Station (Ginza Line)
- Nihombashi Station (Ginza Line, Tozai Line)
- Tokyo Station (Chūō Line, Keihin-Tohoku Line, Keiyo Line, Marunouchi Line, Shinkansen lines, Yamanote Line, Yokosuka Line)

== Education ==
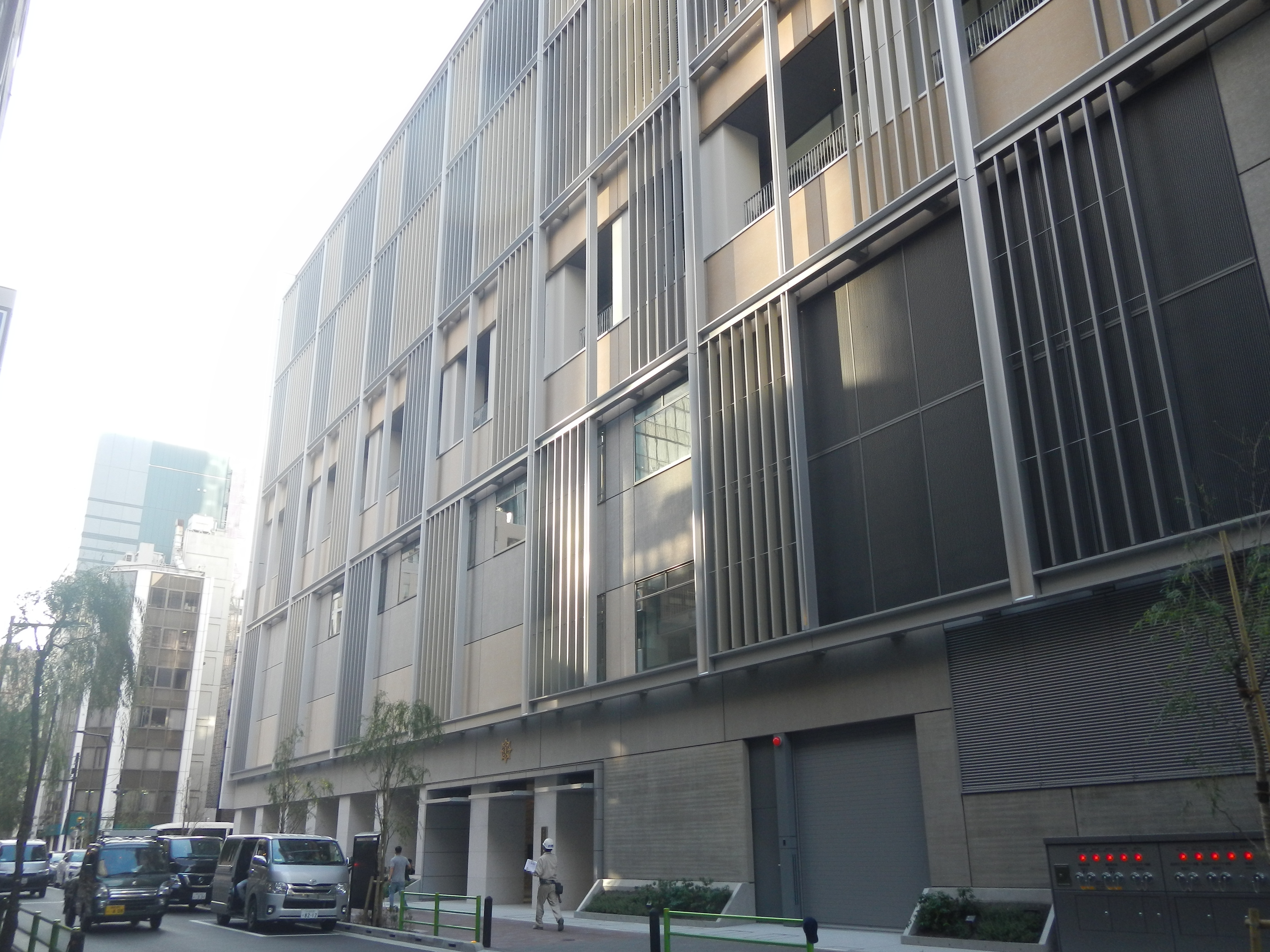
Joto Elementary School (中央区立城東小学校)

Public elementary and junior high schools are operated by Chuo City Board of Education.

All of Yaesu is zoned to Jōtō Elementary School (中央区立城東小学校). Yaesu 1-chome is zoned to Nihonbashi Junior High School (日本橋中学校), while Yaesu 2-chome is zoned to Ginza Junior High School (中央区立銀座中学校)

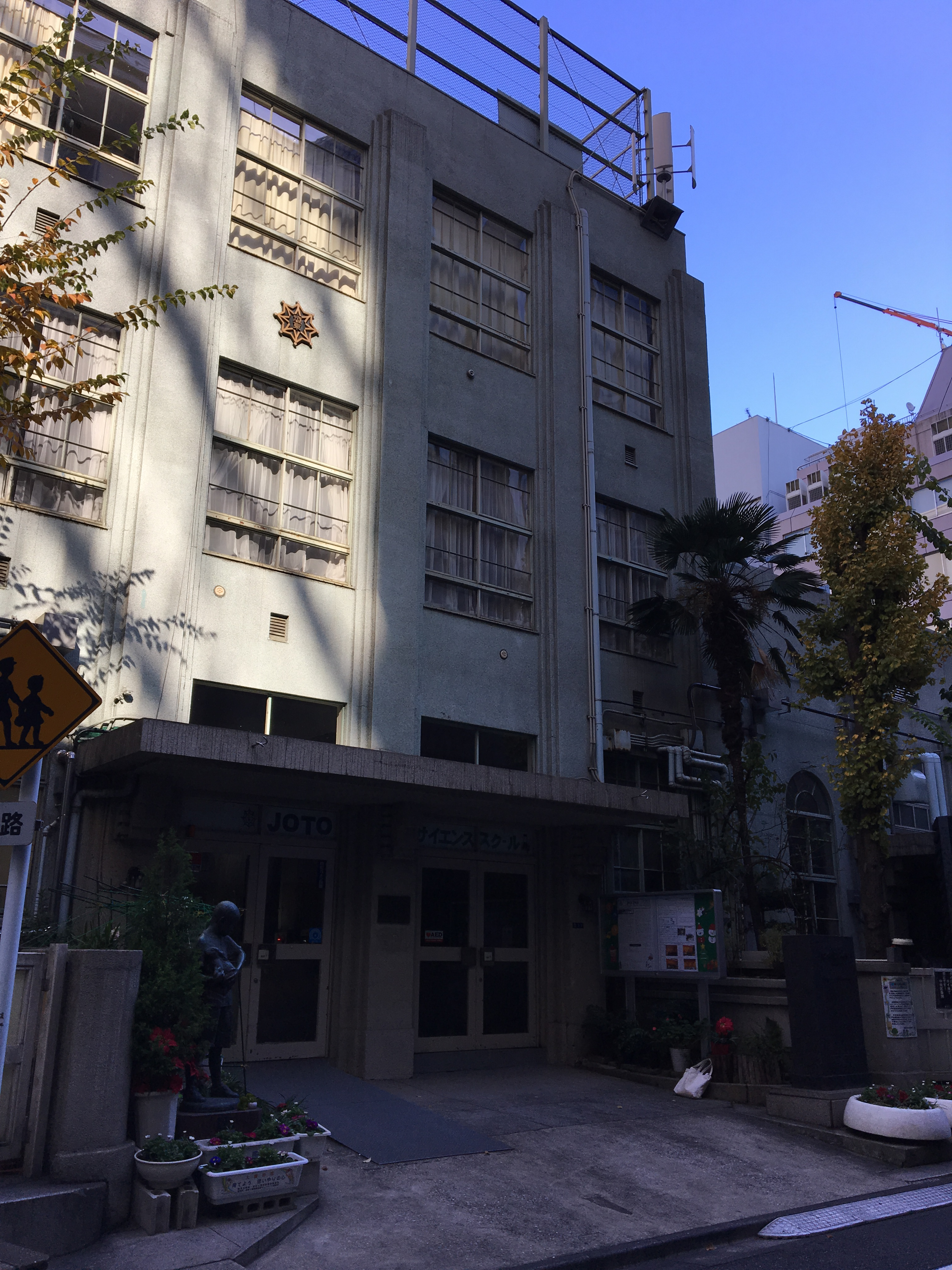
The former building of Joto Elementary School
