= André Ricard Sala =

Spanish industrial designer

André Ricard
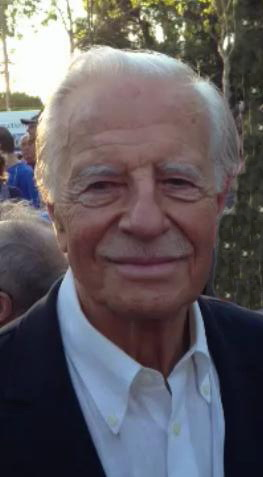
- André Ricard
- Born: 18 June 1929 (age 97); Barcelona, Spain
- Notable work: 1992 Summer Olympics Torch
- Style: Industrial Design

André Ricard Sala (born 18 June 1929) is a Spanish industrial designer. He was born in Barcelona. He designed the torch for the 1992 Summer Olympics. In 1993 he won the Creu de Sant Jordi award.

== Biography ==
Ricard Sala was invited as an observer at the 1959 ICSID Congress and helped found ADIFAD in 1960, the Spanish designers society over which he later presided (1971-1973). He was a member of the ICSID Study Group in 1961, ICSID Vice-President 1963-1971, and the leader of ICSID Design for Disaster Relief in 1976. He founded and presided over ADP, the designer's professional association, in 1978. He was Vice-President of the Barcelona Design Center from 1990 through 1996 and a member of the Faculty of the Art Center - Europe from 1988 through 1996. He was head of Product Design in EINA school from 1993 through 1999. He was the designer of the Olympic torch of the 1992 Barcelona Olympics and of the Olympic Cauldrum at Lausanne's Olympic Museum in 1993. He served as President of the NGO Design for the World from 1999 through 2007. He is a trustee of EINA Foundation and of Loewe Foundation, an Honorary Member of the Saint George Academy (2000), and a member of the Royal Academy of Sciences and Arts (2011).

Ricard Sala won the Spanish National Design Prize in 1987, the Catalan Saint George Cross and the IOC Olympic Order in 1993, Chevalier des Arts et des Lettres from France in 1998 and Chevalier de la Légion d’Honneur of France in 2011. An exhibition of his work was set up at the Miró Museum in 1999.

== Books ==
- Diseño ¿por qué?- Gustavo Gili Editor 1982 (What's design for?)
- Diseño y calidad de vida – BCD Foundation 1985 (Design and quality of life)
- Hablando de diseño- Hogar del libro 1986 (speaking on design)
- La aventura creativa – Editorial Ariel 2000 (The creative adventure)
- En resumen... – Angle Editorial 2003 (in brief...)
- Conversando con estudiantes de diseño – Gustavo Gili Editor 2008 (Speaking with design students)
- Hitos del diseño – Editorial Ariel 2009 (Design hits)
- Casos de diseño – Editorial Ariel 2011 (Design cases)

== Bibliography ==
- Guy Julier, New Spanish Design, London: Thames & Hudson, 1991,
- Emma Dent Coad, Spanish Design and Architecture, London, Studio Vista, 1990
- Robert Hughes, Barcelona, Alfred A. Knopf, New-York 1992.
