= Tokyo Midtown Yaesu =

Mixed-use development in Tokyo, Japan

Yaesu Central Tower
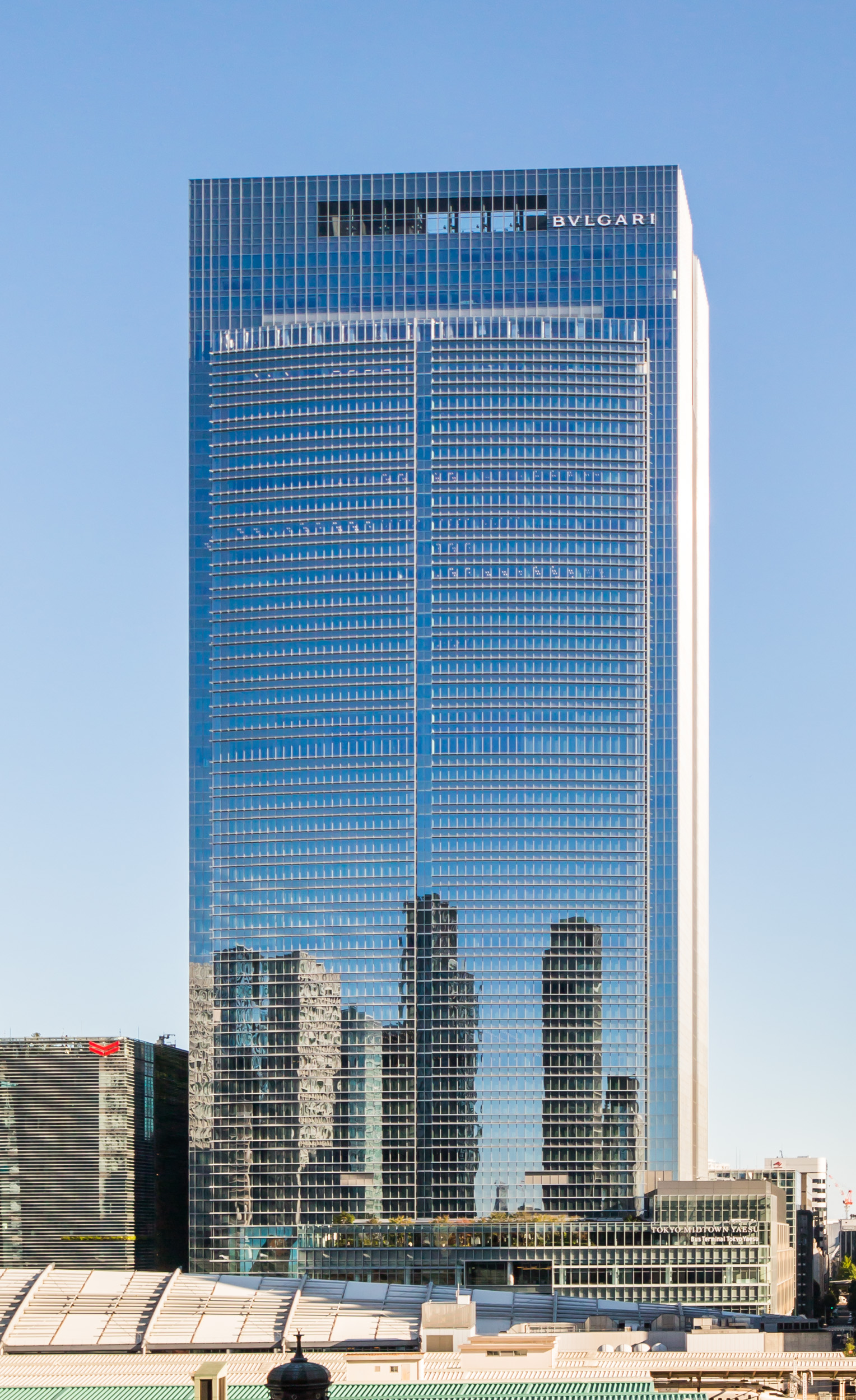

General information
- Status: Completed
- Type: Office, hotel
- Architectural style: Modern
- Location: Yaesu, Chūō, Tokyo, Japan
- Coordinates: 35°40′46″N 139°46′09″E
- Construction started: December 2018
- Completed: 31 August 2022
- Opened: 10 March 2023

Height
- Height: 240 m (790 ft)

Technical details
- Structural system: All-steel
- Floor count: 45
- Floor area: 283,900 m^{2} (3,056,000 sq ft)

Design and construction
- Architecture firm: Pickard Chilton
- Developer: Mitsui Fudosan
- Structural engineer: Nihon Sekkei; Takenaka Corporation
- Main contractor: Takenaka Corporation

Tokyo Midtown Yaesu is a mixed-use development located in the Yaesu district of Chūō, Tokyo, Japan. The centrepiece of the complex is the Yaesu Central Tower, a 240 m (790 ft) tall skyscraper completed in 2022 as Japan's tenth tallest building. The complex also features the Yaesu Central Square, the Bus Terminal Tokyo Yaesu and the Joto Elementary School. US-based Pickard Chilton was in charge of the design, while Mitsui Fudosan developed the complex.

== Overview ==
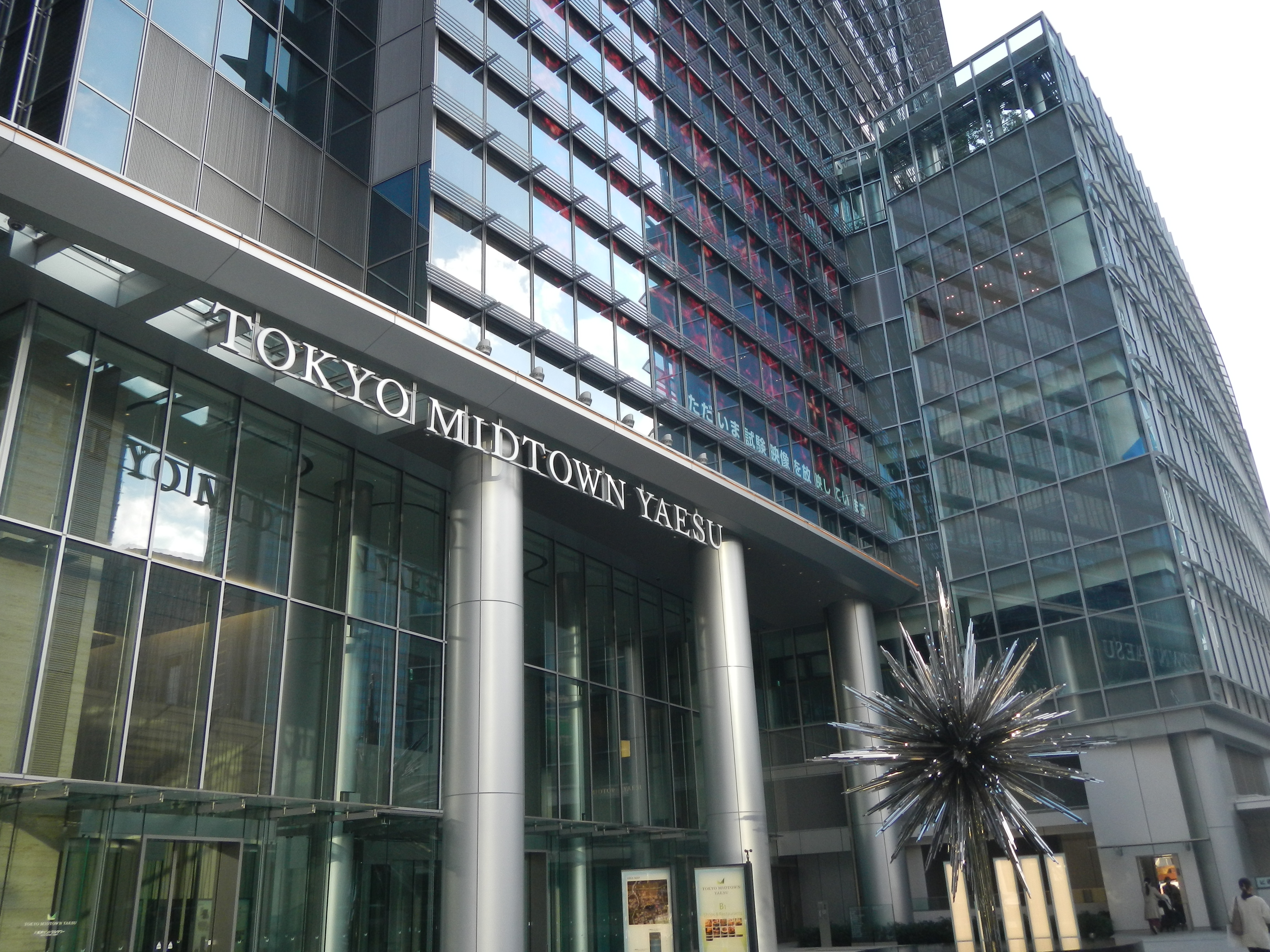
Entrance of Tokyo Midtown Yaesu

Tokyo Midtown Yaesu is the third urban redevelopment complex of the large-scale project "Tokyo Midtown", which is developed by Mitsui Fudosan in the Tokyo metropolitan area.

Budget at 243.8 billion yen (about US$1.8 billion), the redevelopment took place in an area in front of Tokyo Station's Yaesu exit. Construction began in December 2018 and the complex pre-opened on 17 September 2022, with stores on the first basement floor of the Yaesu Central Tower and the second basement floor of the Bus Terminal Tokyo Yaesu. The full opening was held on 10 March 2023.

== Yaesu Central Tower ==
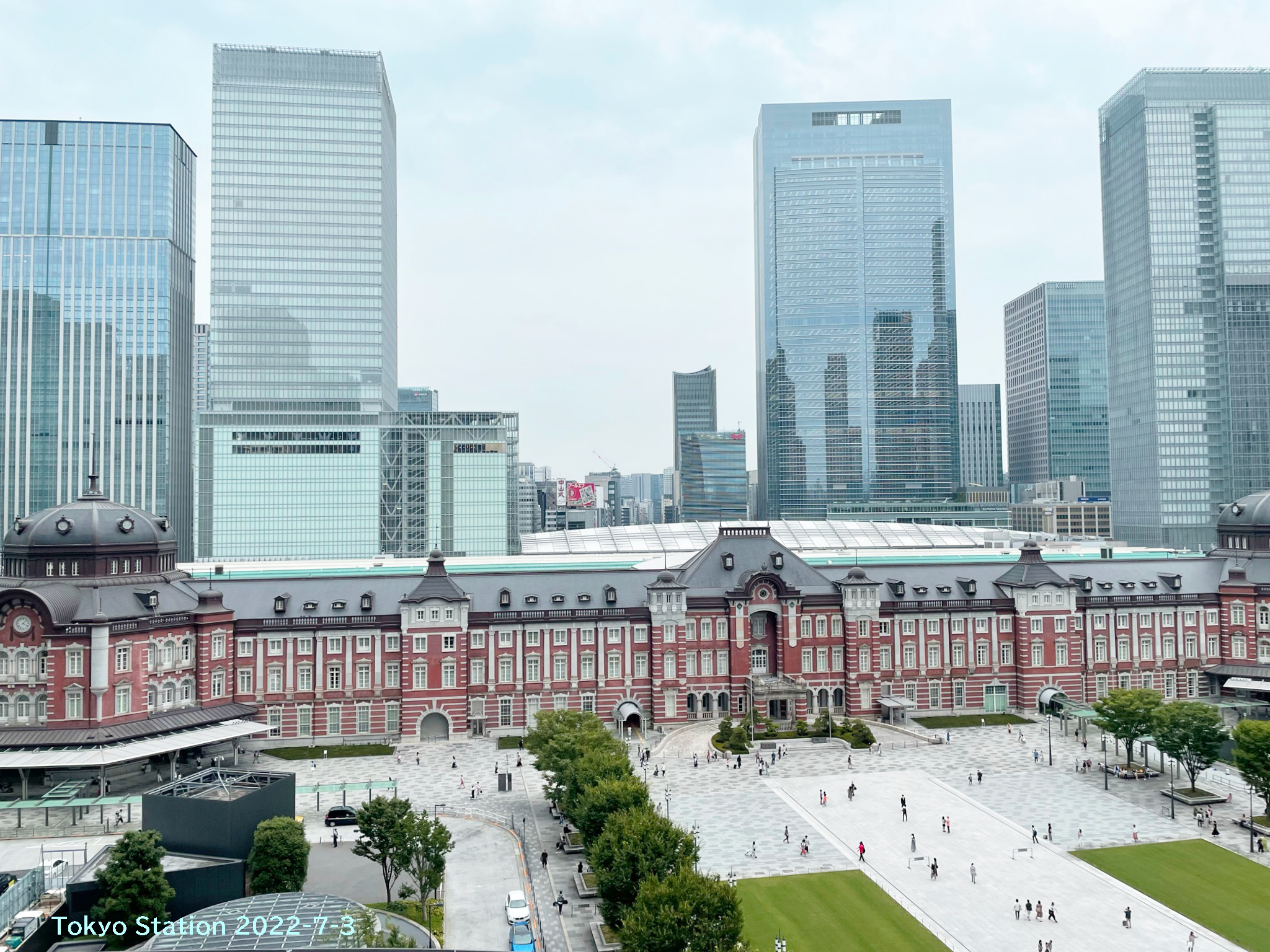
Yaesu Central Tower (centre-right) with Tokyo Station in the foreground

The Yaesu Central Tower features 45 floors of offices, luxury hotels and shops. The mixed-use tower rises 240 m (790 ft) and is connected to Yaechika, the adjacent underground shopping centre, on the first basement floor. Floors 4 and 5 are filled with business exchange facilities and conference rooms. The offices are located from floors 7 to 38, featuring a standard floor area of about 4,000 m^{2} (43,000 sq ft).

From floors 40 to 45 is located the Bulgari Hotel Tokyo, which represents Bulgari's first facility in Japan and eighth overall. The hotel features 98 rooms and was officially opened on 4 April 2023.

=== Tenants ===
In May 2022, Mitsui Fudosan reported that the Yaesu Central Tower was struggling to attract office tenants due to the COVID-19 pandemic, saying that only about 40% to 50% of the office space had been filled at that time. In early March 2023, the developer stated that it had already attracted enough tenants to fill the entire office space.

Companies based in the Yaesu Central Tower include:

- Daikin Industries Tokyo
- JBCC
- GLP Japan
- M&A Capital Partners
- Mitsui Chemicals
- Sumitomo Life
- Bank of Nagoya Tokyo

== Other facilities ==
=== Yaesu Central Square ===
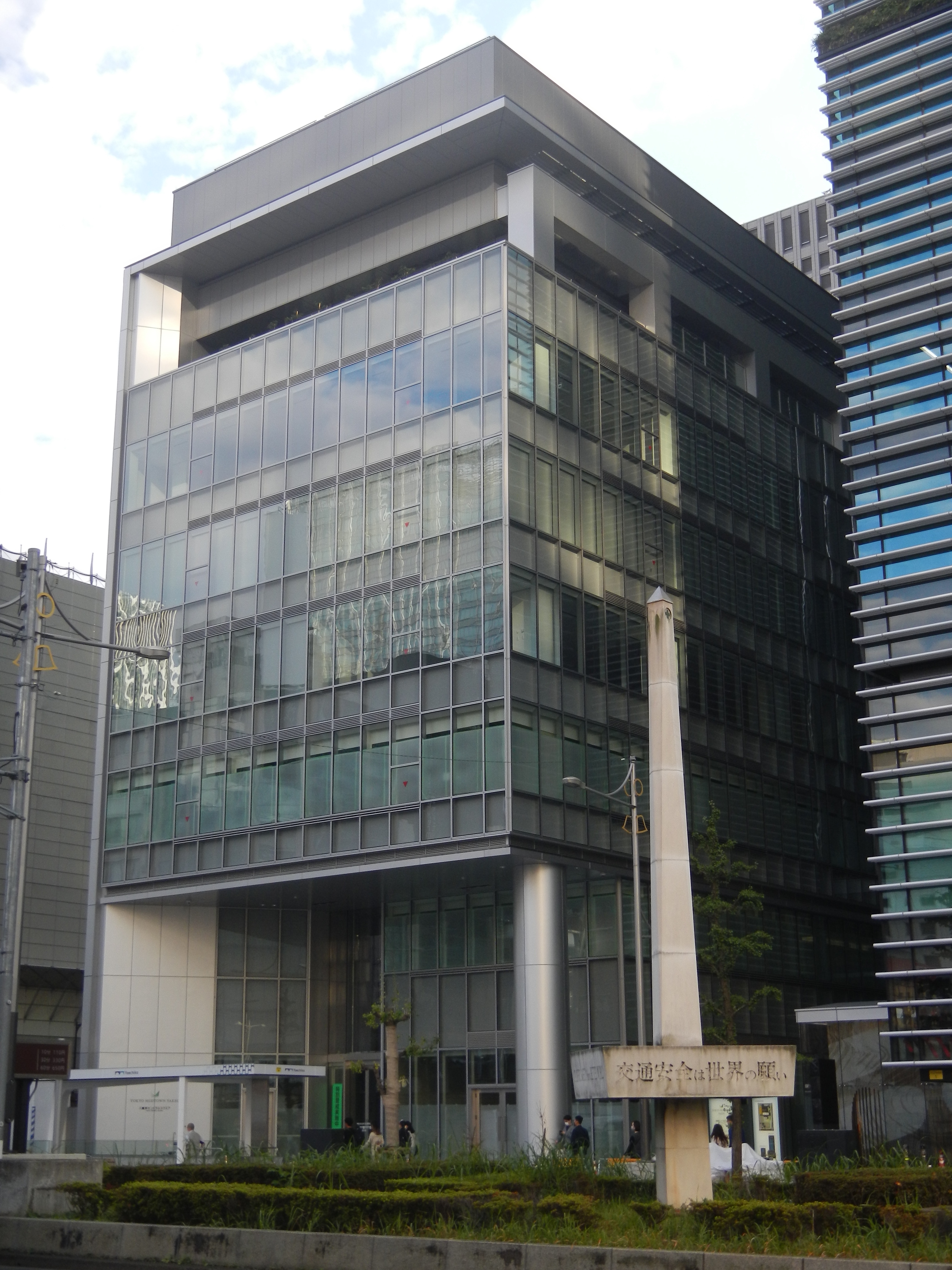
Yaesu Central Square

The low-rise, 41 m (135 ft) tall building consists of seven floors above ground and two floors below ground. The building includes offices, shops, childcare support facilities and parking lots.

=== Bus Terminal Tokyo Yaesu ===
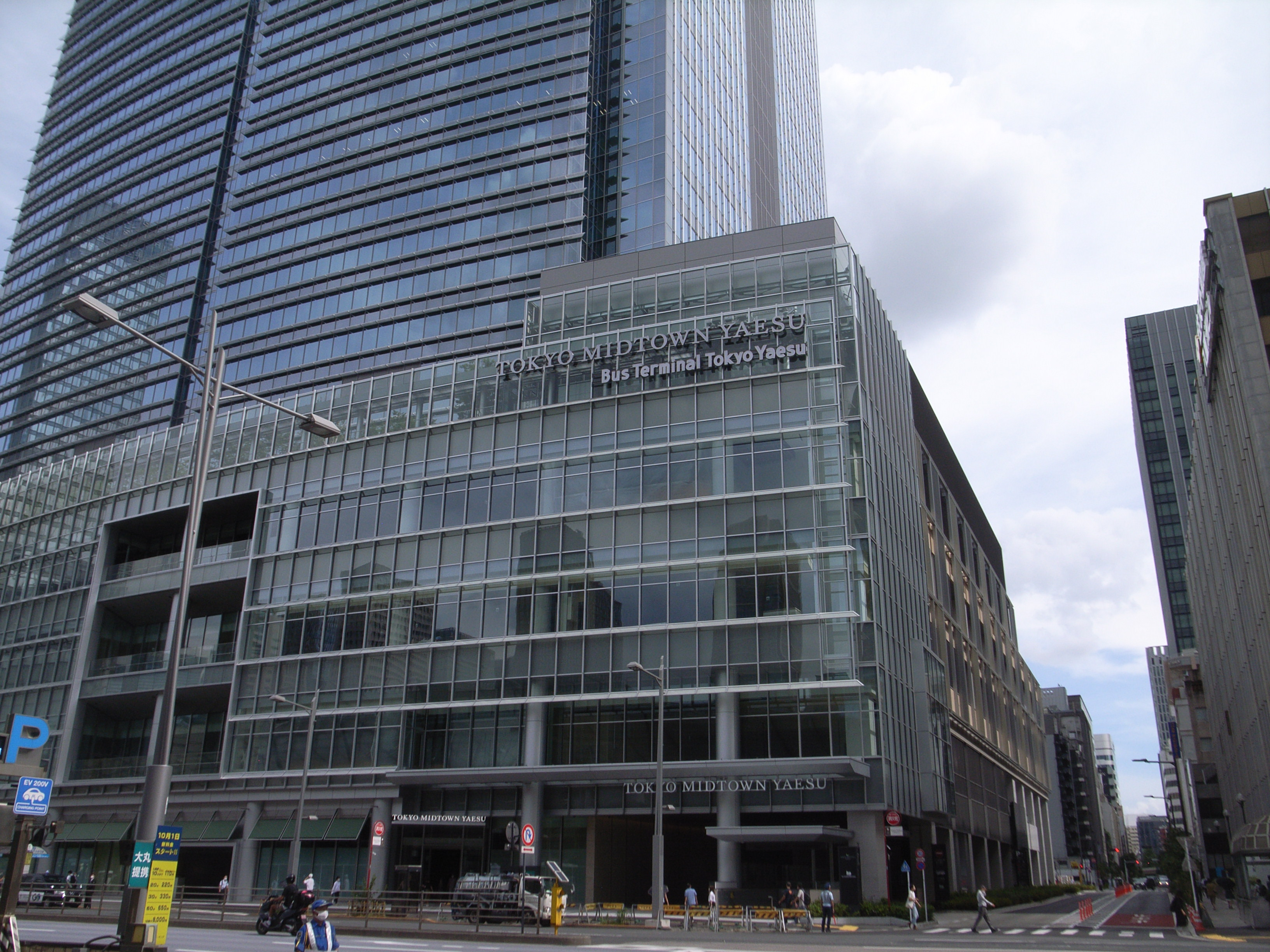
Bus Terminal Tokyo Yaesu

The Bus Terminal Tokyo Yaesu is a major bus terminal adjacent to the Yaesu Central Tower. It is the biggest bus terminal in Japan.

The terminal's first phase (north area) was developed on the first and second basement floors of the Yaesu Central Tower, being opened on 17 September 2022. The second phase (east area) is scheduled to open in 2025, while the third phase (central area) is scheduled to open in 2028.

As of 2023, about 600 buses arrive and depart each day, including highway buses bound for the Bōsō Peninsula in Chiba Prefecture and night buses bound for the Tōhoku, Tōkai and Kansai regions.

=== Joto Elementary School ===
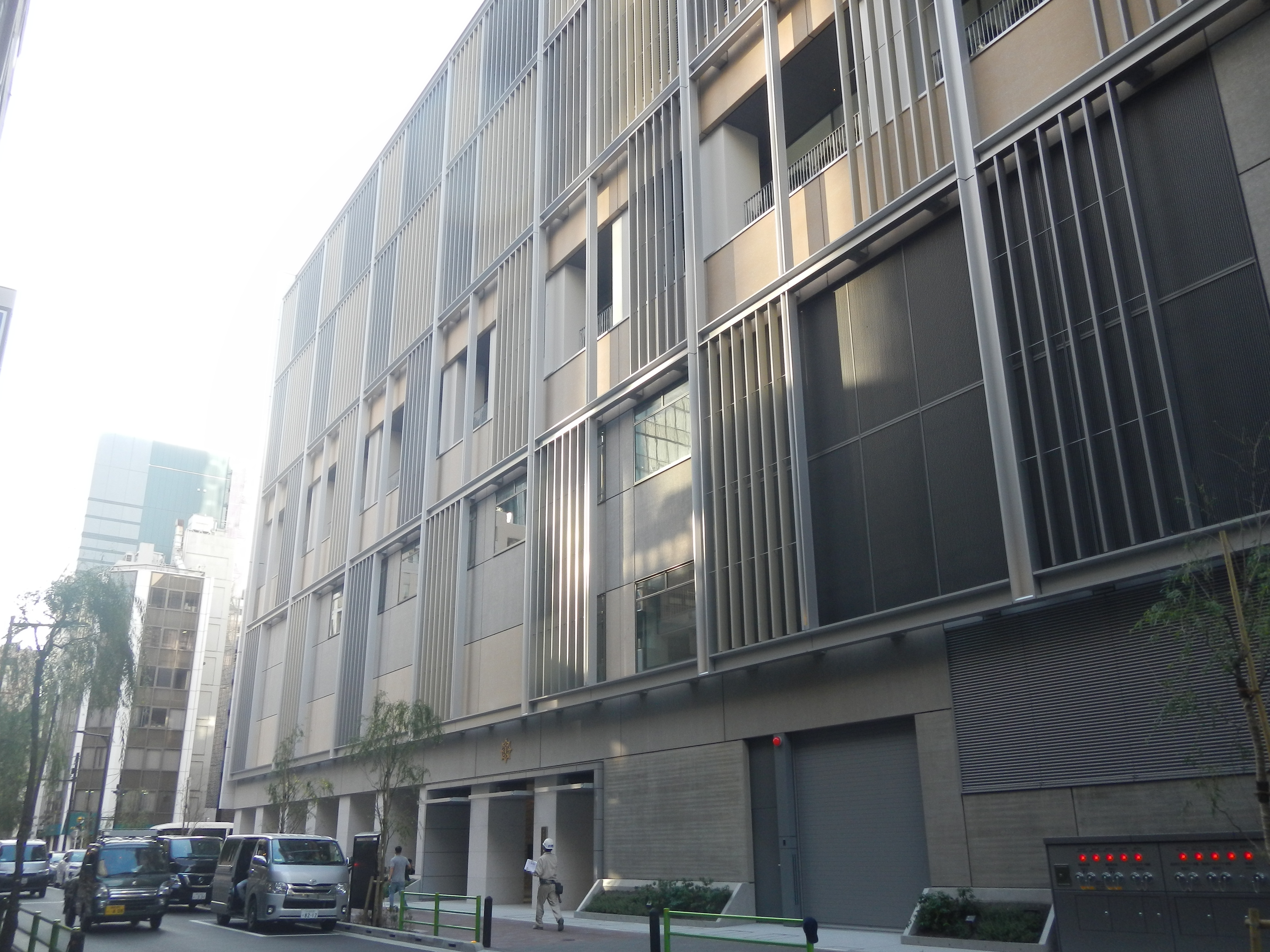
Joto Elementary School

The Chūō Ward Joto Elementary School (中央区立城東小学校, Chūō-ku Ritsu Jōtō Shōgakkō) is located on floors 1–4 of a low-rise overhanging the southeastern part of the Yaesu Central Tower. The school opened in September 2022 to coincide with the beginning of the second semester of that year. A total of 170 students in 6 classrooms currently attend the school.

There are plans to increase the number of classrooms per grade from one to two by 2028, as well as to accept children from outside the school district.

== See also ==
- List of tallest buildings in Japan
