= Canoga Park High School =

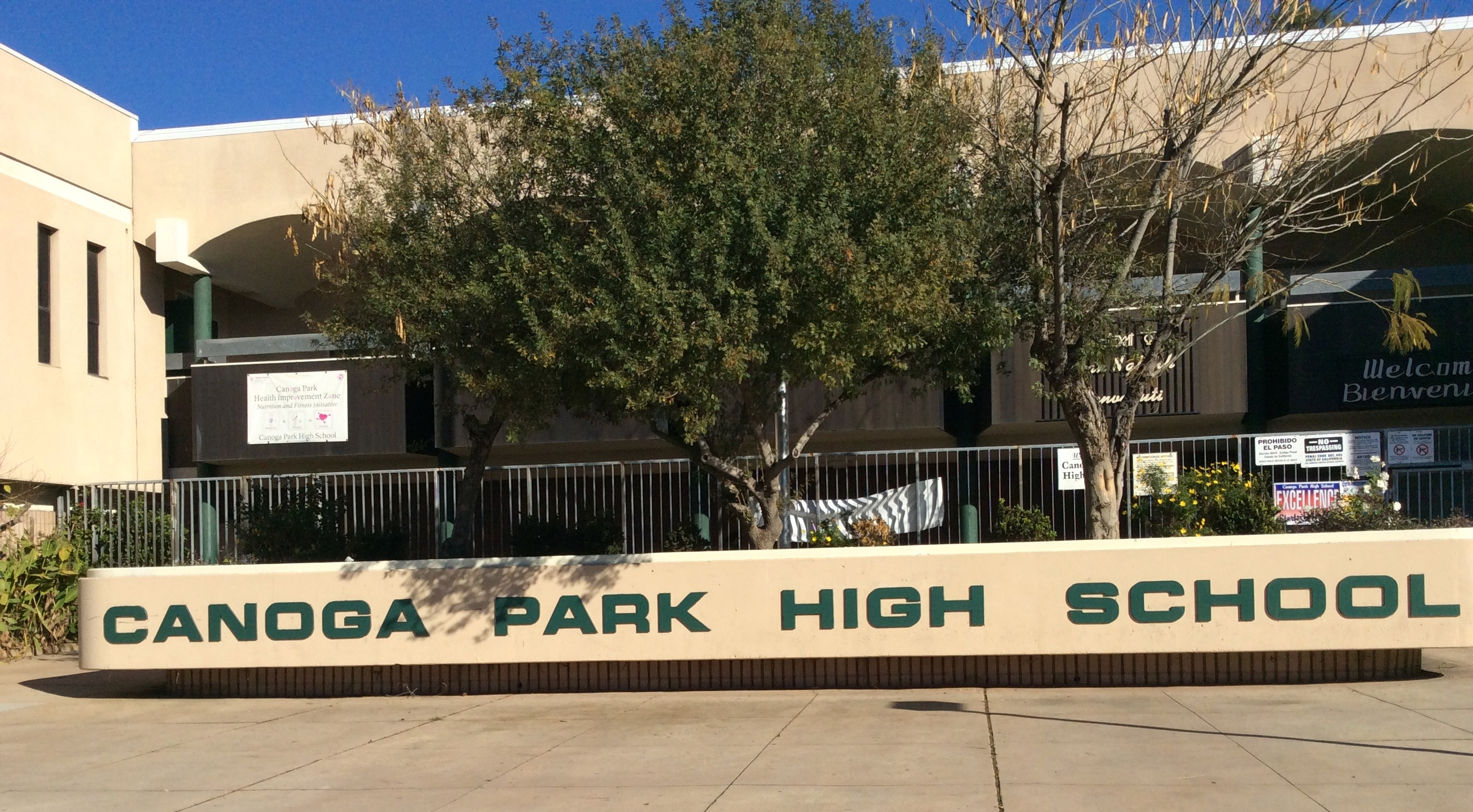
- The main entrance to the school

Location
- 6850 Topanga Canyon Blvd. Canoga Park, California, 91303; United States; 34.195280°N 118.604582°W

Information
- Type: Public
- Motto: "Everyday is a good day at Canoga Park High School”
- Established: 1914
- Status: Opened
- Locale: City, Large
- School district: Los Angeles Unified School District (1961-); Los Angeles City High School District (1914-1961)
- NCES District ID: 0622710
- NCES School ID: 062271002890
- Principal: Nidia Castro
- Teaching staff: 79.23 (on an FTE basis)
- Grades: 9–12
- Enrollment: 1,389 (2024–25)
  - Male: 722
  - Female: 667
- Student to teacher ratio: 17.53
- Colors: Hunter green, white
- Mascot: Hunter
- Website: Official website

Canoga Park High School is a high school located in Canoga Park in the western San Fernando Valley region of the City of Los Angeles, California, United States. It is in the Los Angeles Unified School District. It is located at the start of the Los Angeles River, and adjacent to Topanga Canyon Boulevard to the west and Owensmouth Avenue to the east.

Canoga Park High serves the majority of the Canoga Park area of Los Angeles, and parts of the Winnetka area.

== Geography ==
To the north and south Bell Creek and Arroyo Calabasas (Calabasas Creek) flow around the campus to join on the east side behind the stadium and become the headwaters of the Los Angeles River. The creeks and river were channelized in the 1940s, but still support wildlife.

== History ==
Canoga Park is the oldest high school in the west San Fernando Valley. It opened on October 4, 1914, as Owensmouth High School, with 14 students and 3 teachers. The high school's buildings were in the Beaux-Arts Neoclassical architectural style, unusual for a small town two years old. The school's name was changed in 1931, after the community of Owensmouth changed its name to Canoga Park.

Previously students of the Las Virgenes Union School District attended Canoga Park High School, which was then a part of the Los Angeles City High School District. Effective July 1, 1961, Los Angeles Unified formed, and Canoga Park High School became a part of that district, while the Las Virgenes territories remained in the Los Angeles City High School District, which became the West County Union High School District. Los Angeles Unified was still scheduled to take in Las Virgenes students. However, when the Topanga School District merged into LA Unified, the Las Virgenes Union School District automatically merged, as per California law, on July 1, 1962, with the West County Union High School District, forming the Las Virgenes Unified School District. This meant that by then Las Virgenes residents were no longer zoned to Canoga Park High.

Among the school's features are a coast redwood grove planted in 1936 just north of the football field. A classic Greek outdoor theater was part of the school in early years. For 40 years, the Greek styled 100 Building was the pride of Canoga Park. It housed the school library and administrative offices, and was a well-known community landmark. In 1971, the building suffered severe damage in the Sylmar earthquake and it was condemned and demolished in the summer of 1975. The demolished 100 and 200 buildings were replaced with new facilities that opened in March 1978.

The Assembly Hall was built during the Great Depression by the Federal Emergency Administration of Public Works and completed in 1939. It survived the 1971 earthquake and is in use today. It is identified in the California Register of Historic Resources as historically significant.

The movie Fast Times at Ridgemont High was partially filmed at Canoga Park High School.

== Magnets ==
Canoga Park High School's two magnets are Communication, Arts & Media (CAM) and Engineering, Environmental and Veterinary Sciences (EEVS), which were redesigned for the 2017-2018 school year.

The CAM Magnet has sequential courses designed to promote careers in digital media and arts, communication technology, and programming and coding. It features a new $5 million studio complex with state-of-the-art equipment, offering students courses in photography, video production, video game and app design, computer programming, graphic arts and advertising and public relations.

The EEVS Magnet has sequential courses designed to promote careers in engineering, architecture, green technology, veterinary science, agriculture and sustainable farming, social ecology, building trades engineering, veterinary and environmental science. It features a $1 million renovation project to transform an old shop classroom into an engineering design studio with 3D printing and computer design capabilities, and provide a home for the new building trades multi-core curriculum.

== Robotics ==
Canoga Park High School boasts a successful FIRST Tech Challenge team. Having won second place in regionals during the 2009-2010 and 2010-2011 competition years, the team has won various awards for their efforts. The team has started two additional robotics FIRST LEGO League clubs in neighboring schools such as Hale Middle School and Sutter Middle School, but also hopes to start an additional club in Columbus Middle School. The high school's robotics team competes in FIRST Robotics Competition as of the 2010–2011 years and FIRST Tech Challenge.

== Sports ==
Canoga Park High School fields teams for boys and girls in football, basketball, soccer, baseball, softball, volleyball, tennis, golf, track & field, cross country, water polo, swimming and wrestling. The teams have won CIF Championships in sports, including football, basketball, baseball, track & field, soccer, volleyball, cross country and tennis. The school has had several successful individual athletes.

The school has a marching band, cheerleading, dance and drill teams.

== Notable alumni ==
- LaVar Ball, former basketball player, businessman, and reality TV star
- Barney Burman, Academy Award-winning makeup artist
- Bryan Cranston, actor
- Lloyd G. Davies, Los Angeles City Council member, 1943–51
- Sally Fraser, actress
- Vern Fuller, MLB player (Cleveland Indians)
- Jackie Earle Haley, actor
- Will E. Jackson, Greenpeace co-founder and crew member, 1975
- Keith Jardine, wrestler, football player, and mixed martial artist
- Catherine Mulholland, historian and author
- Lori Nelson, actress
- Lyn Nofziger, journalist and aide to U.S. presidents Richard Nixon and Ronald Reagan
- Royal F. Oakes, radio talk show host and attorney
- Jacqueline Obradors, actress
- Biff Pocoroba, MLB player (Atlanta Braves)
- Sean Reyes, attorney General for the State of Utah
- Byron Smith, NFL player
- Kurtwood Smith, actor
- Bradley Steffens, author
- Fay Thomas, MLB player (New York Giants, Cleveland Indians, Brooklyn Dodgers, St. Louis Browns)
- Robert M. Wilkinson (ca. 1921–2010), Los Angeles City Council member and lobbyist
- Jon Zens, author and editor

== See also ==
- History of the San Fernando Valley to 1915
