= Park Court Akasaka Hinokicho The Tower =

- パークコート赤坂檜町ザ タワー
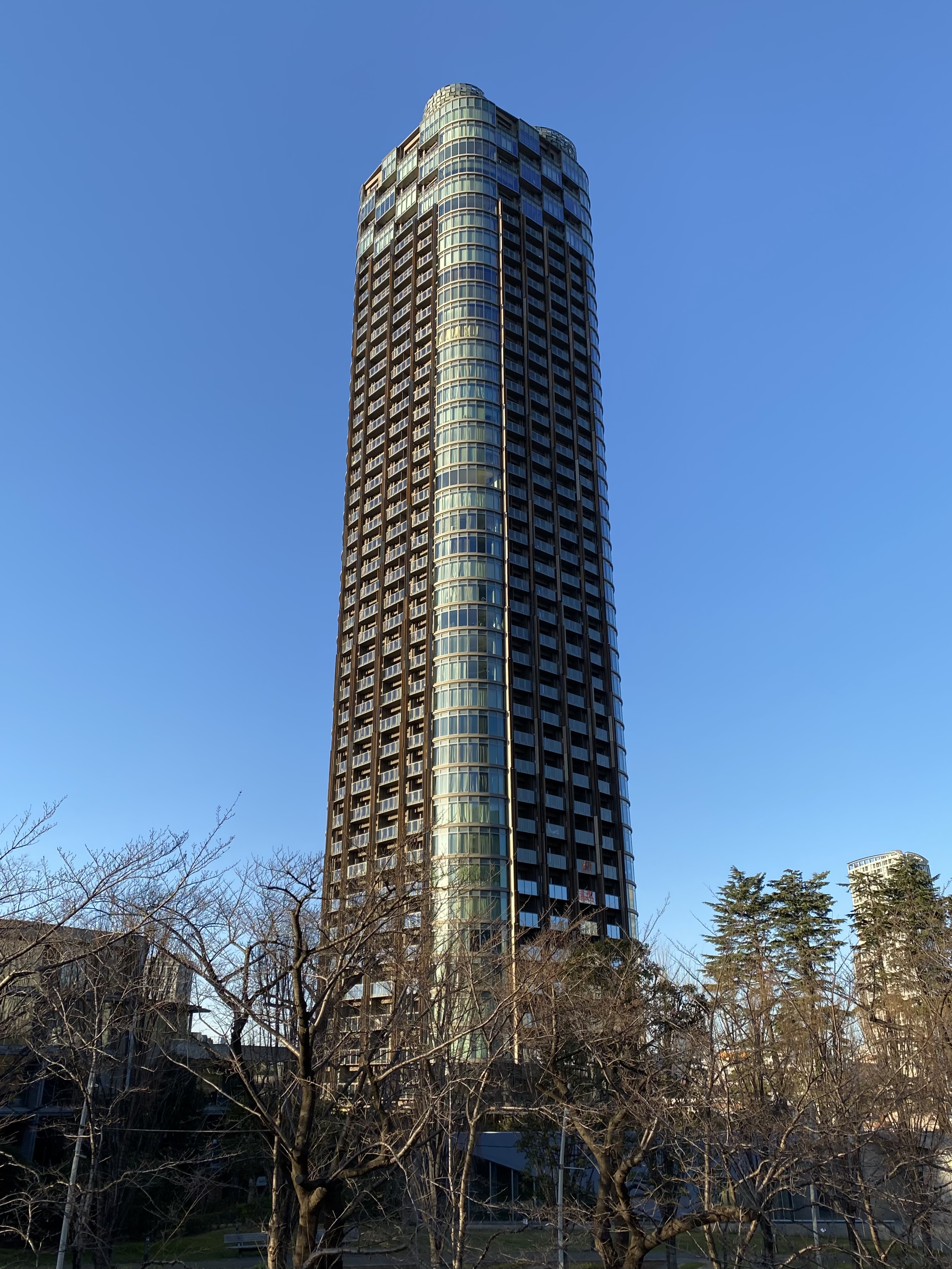

General information
- Status: Completed
- Type: Residential, Childcare facility, Nursing care facility
- Location: Minato, Tokyo, Japan, 9-4-1 Akasaka, Minato, Tokyo
- Construction started: February 26, 2015
- Completed: February 26, 2018

Height
- Roof: 166.23 m (545.4 ft)
- Top floor: 44

Technical details
- Structural system: Reinforced concrete (partially structural steel)
- Floor count: 44 (+1 underground)
- Floor area: 44,443.25 m^{2} (478,383.2 sq ft)

Design and construction
- Architect: Nikken Sekkei
- Developer: Mitsui Fudosan
- Main contractor: Taisei Corporation

Park Court Akasaka Hinokicho The Tower (パークコート赤坂檜町ザ タワー, Pākukōto Akasaka Hinokichō Zatawā) is a skyscraper residential building located in Akasaka, Minato, Tokyo, Japan.

In fiscal year 2018, it received the Good Design Award in the housing complex category, organized by the Japan Institute of Design Promotion.

== Overview ==
The redevelopment was initiated amid growing calls for the renewal of an area characterized by a concentration of aging buildings surrounding Minato City Nakanocho Kindergarten. The project was undertaken as the Akasaka 9-chome North District Urban Redevelopment Project. Adjacent to the site, Tokyo Midtown had already been completed, and the project aimed to create an integrated urban landscape with the surrounding development. The building was designed by Nikken Sekkei and Kengo Kuma & Associates. The redevelopment also included the renovation of Kuwata Memorial Children's Playground, which was located within the site.

Some of the condominium units on the upper floors were priced at more than ¥1.5 billion, making them the most expensive condominium units in Japan since the collapse of the asset price bubble in the early 1990s.

== History ==
- June 2013: The urban redevelopment plan was approved.
- February 2015: Construction began.
- February 2018: Construction was completed.

== Transportation ==
- Nogizaka Station on the Tokyo Metro Chiyoda Line.
- Roppongi Station on the Toei Oedo Line and the Tokyo Metro Hibiya Line.

== Nearby facilities ==
- Hinokicho Park
- Nogi Shrine
- Tokyo Midtown
- Minato City Akasaka Elementary School
- Minato City Nakanocho Kindergarten

== See also ==
- List of tallest buildings in Japan
- List of tallest structures in Tokyo
