= Midtown Tower =

Skyscraper in Tokyo, Japan

- ミッドタウンタワー
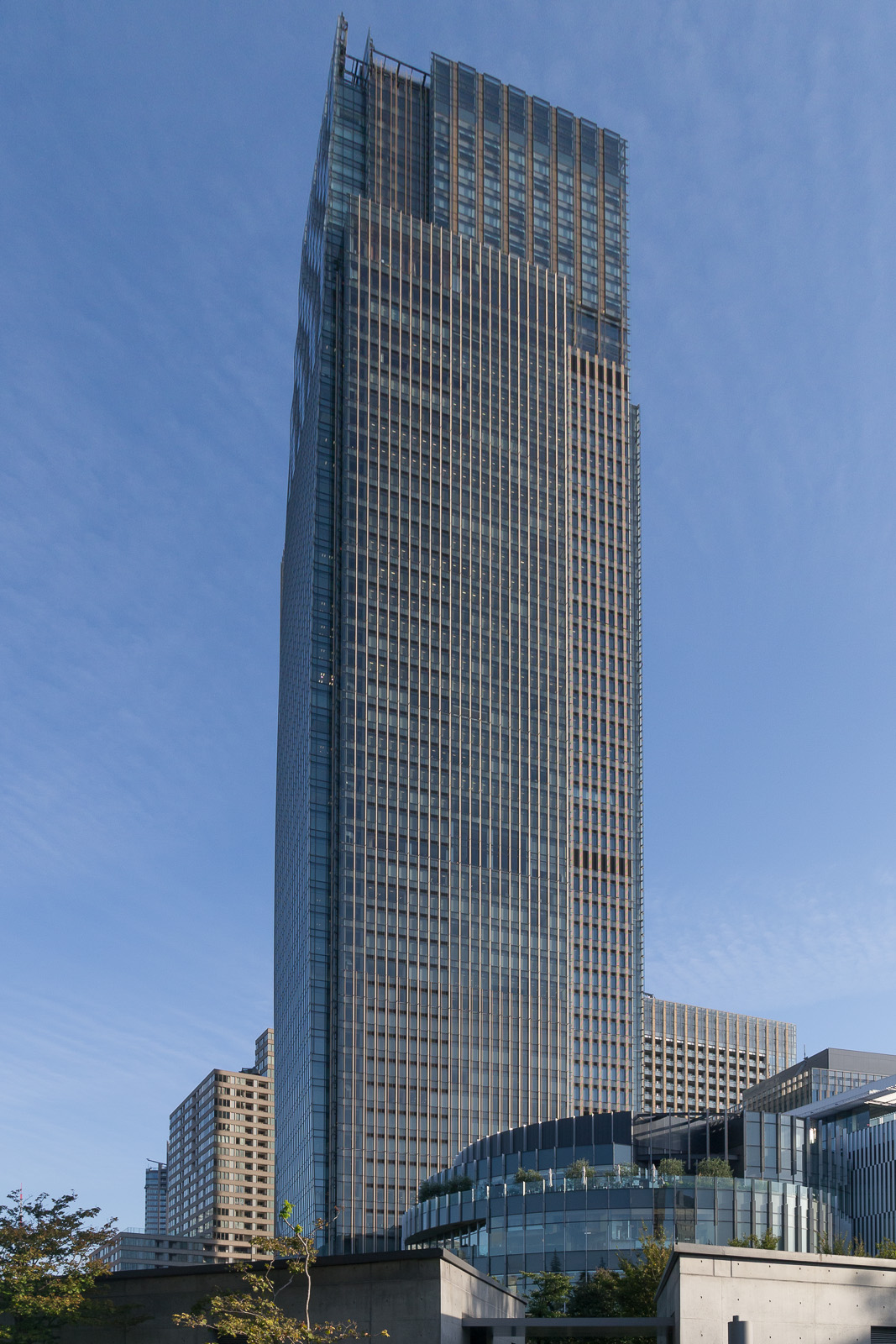
- Midtown Tower with Gardenside in the foreground

General information
- Location: 9-7-1 Akasaka, Minato; Tokyo, Japan
- Coordinates: 35°39′59″N 139°43′54″E
- Construction started: 2004
- Completed: 2007
- Opening: March 31, 2007
- Owner: Mitsui Fudosan Co., Ltd

Height
- Roof: 248.1 meters (814 ft)

Technical details
- Floor count: 54 above ground 5 below ground
- Floor area: 246,408 m^{2} (2,652,310 sq ft)

Design and construction
- Architect: Skidmore, Owings and Merrill
- Structural engineer: Nikken Sekkei Ltd.
- Main contractor: Takenaka Corporation; Taisei Corporation

Midtown Tower (ミッドタウンタワー, Middotaun tawā) is a mixed-use skyscraper in Akasaka, Minato, Tokyo, Japan. Completed in 2007, it is the tallest of the six buildings within the Tokyo Midtown complex, at 248.1 meters (814 ft), and was the tallest building in Tokyo until 2014.

== Construction ==
Located at the center of the Tokyo Midtown development, Midtown Tower is the tallest of the six buildings located within the complex. At 248.1 meters (814 ft), it was the tallest building in Tokyo from the completion of primary construction in January 2007 until the completion of Toranomon Hills in 2014. Its official grand opening was on March 31, 2007, though the offices had been open since February. The building was designed by Chicago-based architectural firm Skidmore, Owings and Merrill with help from Nikken Sekkei Ltd. and built by the Takenaka and Taisei Corporations.

== Facilities ==
As a mixed-use facility, Midtown Tower's 54 floors are utilized in different ways. Several conference rooms occupy the entirety of the 4th floor. The 5th floor is the home of the Tokyo Midtown Design Hub, a gallery and space for exhibitions, collaborations and discussions by designers. Tokyo Midtown Medical Center is located on the 6th floor. This medical facility is the first Japan-based collaboration with Johns Hopkins University. Unlike similar supertall skyscrapers in the area such as Roppongi Hills Mori Tower, Midtown Tower's top 54th floor is not a visitors' observation deck but rather houses building components and maintenance facilities.

=== Office tenants ===
Floors 7 to 44 are designated as commercial office space and house the offices of (among others):

- Bain & Company
- Blackstone Group
- Cisco Systems
- Coca-Cola Bottlers Japan Holdings
- Coupa Software
- Diageo
- Fast Retailing (Roppongi Office)
- Herbert Smith Freehills
- Hudson Soft (formerly)
- Nike
- Nikko Asset Management
- Sony Music Entertainment Japan (Tokyo 2nd Office)
- State Street Bank (formerly)
- Yahoo! Japan (formerly)

=== Ritz-Carlton, Tokyo ===
Floors 45 to 53 are home to Japan's second Ritz-Carlton hotel – the 247-room Ritz-Carlton Tokyo. The hotel offers many notable features, including Japan's most expensive Presidential Suite, available for $20,000 per night, and an "authentic" 200-year-old Japanese tearoom. Four works measuring 8.1 meters (27 ft) in height by American painter Sam Francis appear in the building's lobby, that, along with the second and third floors, is utilized by the hotel.

The Ritz-Carlton Suite, billed at US$26,300 per night, was listed at number 9 on the World's 15 most expensive hotel suites compiled by CNN Go in 2012.

== See also ==
- List of tallest structures in Japan

Records
Preceded by Tokyo Metropolitan Government Building No. 1	Tallest building in Tokyo; 248 m (814 ft); 2007–2014	Succeeded by Toranomon Hills Mori Tower
