= Notre Dame Academy (Los Angeles, California) =

Notre Dame Academy Girls High School

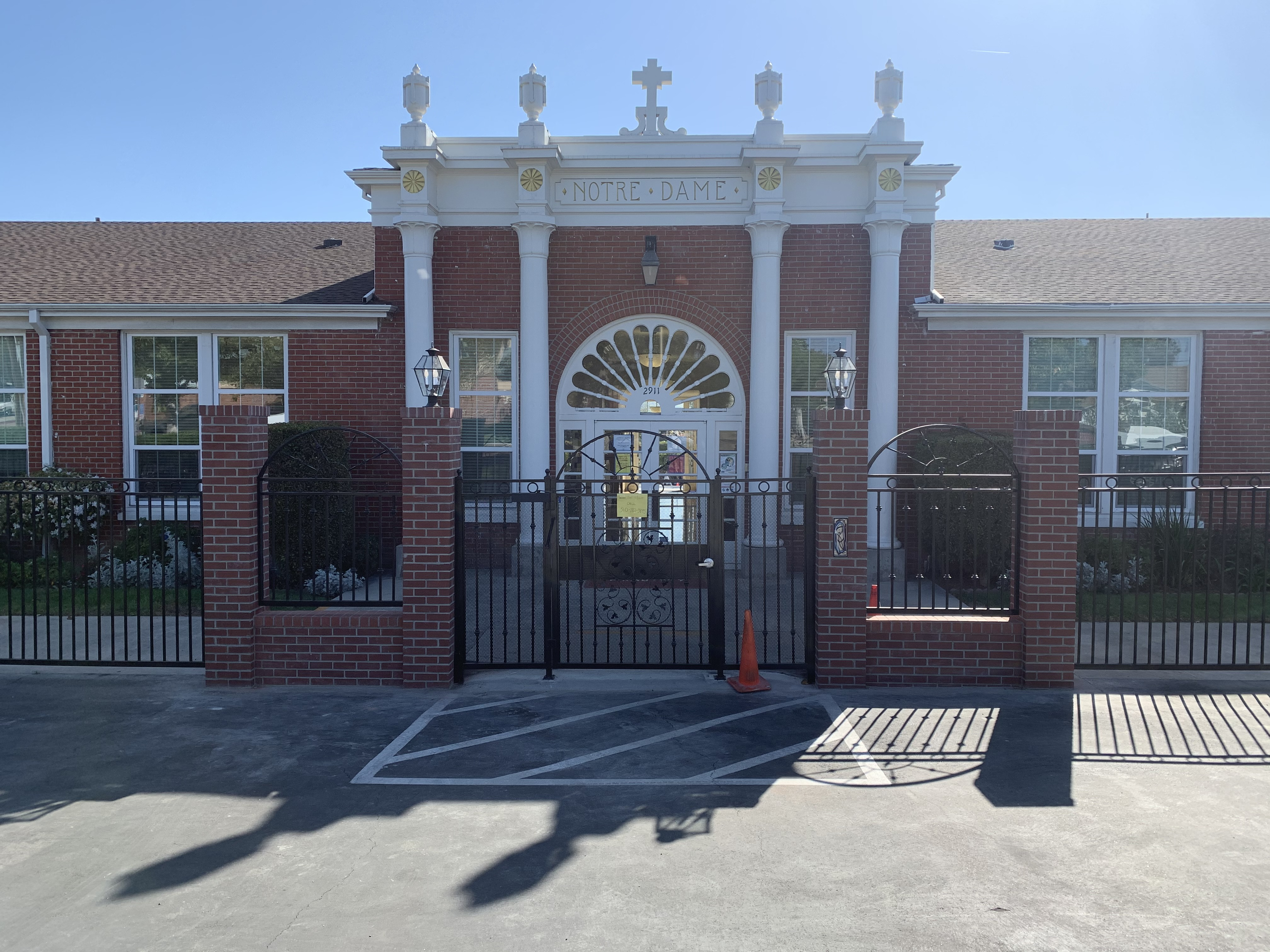

Location
- 2851 Overland Avenue; Los Angeles, California; United States
- 34°2′4″N 118°25′10″W

Information
- Type: Private, college-preparatory All-girls education institution
- Motto: Dei Gloria Mariae Honor (Latin)
- Religious affiliation: Roman Catholic
- Established: 1949
- Founder: Sisters of Notre Dame of Coesfeld
- Oversight: Archdiocese of Los Angeles
- CEEB code: 051730
- President: Lilliam Paetzold
- Chairperson: Mark Nixon
- Director: Melissa Martinez (Admissions Team); Dick Williams (Director of Finance & HR)
- Faculty: 55
- Grades: 9–12
- Average class size: 17
- Student to teacher ratio: 9:1
- Campus type: Urban
- Colors: Crimson and gold
- Athletics conference: CIF Southern Section; Sunshine League
- Nickname: Regal Gryphons
- Accreditation: Western Association of Schools and Colleges
- Newspaper: The Gryphon Post
- Yearbook: Royale
- Tuition: $27,430 for grades 9-10 $27,730 for grades 11-12
- Assistant Head of School: Brad Fuller
- Assistant Head of School: Christine Lagrimas
- Website: http://academy.ndasla.org

Notre Dame Academy Girls High School is a private, all-girls Catholic high school located in West Los Angeles, California, United States. Part of the Roman Catholic Archdiocese of Los Angeles, it was founded in 1949 by the Sisters of Notre Dame.

== Description ==
The school offers 18 advanced placement classes and 12 honors classes.

== Notable alumnae ==
- Lana Condor, Class of 2015, actress (To All the Boys I've Loved Before)
- Diana Ramos, Class of 1984, Surgeon General of California
- Cathie Wood, Class of 1974, founder, CEO, and CIO of Ark Invest
- Linda Gray, Class of 1958, Emmy-nominated actress (Dallas)
