= The Dennis Miller Show (radio) =

- Genre: Conservative talk, comedy
- Running time: 3 hours
- Country of origin: United States
- Language: English
- Syndicates: Westwood One (1976–2011); Westwood One
- Hosted by: Dennis Miller
- Starring: Dennis Miller, Christian Bladt, David S. Weiss
- Announcer: Larry Kenney
- Recording studio: Santa Barbara, California, Culver City, California
- Original release: March 26, 2007 – February 26, 2015
- Opening theme: original
- Ending theme: You Get What You Give

The Dennis Miller Show was a conservative American comedy and talk radio show hosted by comedian Dennis Miller on Westwood One. The show ran from 2007 until 2015.

== Show airtime and format ==
The Dennis Miller Show aired at different times at various locations with Miller broadcasting out of his home in the Santa Barbara, California area and with the rest of the show being broadcast from Culver City, California.

=== Website ===
The radio show also featured a website with additional material for paid subscribers. The additional website material included a message board, merchandise, and video clips of Dennis answering viewers questions in segment called the "Bathrobe Sessions".

=== Music ===
The Dennis Miller Show used music as a significant part of the show. Each Wednesday featured music from a different artist or musical theme, billed as “Bumper Music Wednesday.” Many of the selections were of a classic rock format.

Frequent bumper music included the ending of "Eclipse" by Pink Floyd, a middle section of "Radar Love" by Golden Earring, and a piano section of "New Year's Day" by U2.

=== Notable sayings and characters ===
- Chimp doctor
- Kwok Brothers commercials
- Touching Indians—taking phones called, saying from Lost in America
- Slappy and Comandante—fake names for producer Christian and Dennis, aping Morning zoo radio personalities
- "Shalom Aloha"—"and an Aloha Shalom to you"
- "Skeetuh?"—"Skeetuh good."
- Bit surfin'—"Two Tags on Every Bit!"
- "Starship"—cue to play We Built This City
- "Cheng Huan lived alone in a room on Formosa Street above the Blue Lantern, and he sat at his window and in his poor, listening heart..." (Audio clip from Out of Africa played when Dennis rambled too much on an obscure humor attempt.)
- Siamnesia Torncurtain, the cat shouter—"Hey, get off that!"
- The love theme from The Delta Force, special music
- Dennis' former dog—Chicken Leg Desmond, Welfare Cheat
- Woodsy Monckton, the Procrastinative Survivalist
- Cass Stokeley, consumptive bouncer
- The Burglar Owl—"Who? Me?"

=== Notable political guests ===
- George W. Bush, former President of the United States
- Dick Cheney, former Vice President of the United States
- Henry Kissinger, former U.S. Secretary of State
- Donald Rumsfeld, former U.S. Secretary of Defense
- Rudy Giuliani, former Mayor of New York City
- Boris Johnson, Mayor of London
- Michael Chertoff, U.S. Secretary of Homeland Security
- John McCain, U.S. senator and former presidential candidate
- Mitt Romney, former presidential candidate and Massachusetts governor
- Jack Kemp, former vice presidential candidate, HUD Secretary, and congressman
- Sarah Palin, former vice presidential candidate and Alaska governor
- Paul Ryan, congressman and former vice presidential candidate
- Ted Sorensen, special counsel and speechwriter for John F. Kennedy
- Robert F. Kennedy, Jr., environmental activist and son of Robert F. Kennedy

=== Frequent guests ===
- Debra Saunders, conservative columnist from San Francisco
- Victor Davis Hanson, conservative historian and author from California
- John Bolton, former UN ambassador (played on to the song "I Am the Walrus" due to his walrus moustache)
- David Dreier, former California congressman (a weekly guest during the first few years)
- Jillian Melchior, National Review columnist
- Charles Krauthammer, conservative columnist, author, and television commentator
- Jerome Corsi, conservative writer and conspiracy theorist (played on to the theme music from Lost in Space)
- Mike Murphy, Republican Party political consultant (played on to the theme music from The Dam Busters)
- Bill Kristol, editor of the Weekly Standard and television commentator
- Thaddeus McCotter, former Michigan congressman and presidential candidate
- Mark Steyn, conservative author and music critic
- Peter Noone, singer from Herman's Hermits and Santa Barbara neighbor
- Orson Bean, actor, comedian, and raconteur
- Zuhdi Jasser, Muslim critic of extreme Islamism
- Dana Carvey, comedian and impressionist
- Ted Nugent, rock musician and hunting-rights advocate
- Adam Sandler, comedian, actor, and film-maker
- Norm Macdonald, comedian, actor and writer
- Jesse Lee Peterson, founder of The Brotherhood Organization of a New Destiny
- Kyndra Rotunda, former officer in the U.S. Army JAG Corps
- Thomas Sowell, economist, author, and photographer
- Jake Tapper, CNN and ABC News correspondent (nicknamed by Dennis as Tap-Tap the Chiseler)
- Bob Massi, Fox News legal analyst (nicknamed by Dennis as Classy Bobby Massi)

== Program staff ==
- Christian Bladt, producer and sidekick during later years.
- David S. Weiss, comedian and sidekick from March 2007 until February 2010.
- The rest of the staff were given nicknames with the sound board operators named Liev and Saberhagen and the call screeners and additional staff named Coltrane, Munga, and Agent Starling.

=== Frequent substitute hosts ===
- Larry O'Connor, a website writer and former theatre manager
- Andrew Breitbart, a conservative website publisher and commentator
- Nick DiPaolo, a stand-up comedian
- Royal F. Oakes, a Los Angeles-area lawyer and legal analyst
- Douglas Urbanski, a film producer and raconteur
- Christian Bladt, the show’s producer
- Other mostly one-time substitute hosts included Norm Macdonald, Jon Lovitz, Allen Covert, Scott Baio, Clint Howard, Larry Miller, Howie Carr, Greg Gutfeld, Thaddeus McCotter, and Robert Wuhl.

== Related Projects ==
- The Dennis Miller Option, a twice-weekly 2018 podcast hosted by Dennis Miller and Christian Bladt
- Red Circle Sports with Dennis Miller, a 2018 sports podcast hosted by Dennis Miller
- The P’Od podcast, a weekly hour-long 2015 podcast hosted by Dennis Miller and Adam Carolla
- The O'Reilly Factor, weekly Dennis Miller comedy segments every Wednesday
- The Bladt Cast, a podcast by show producer Christian Bladt and other former staff

== See also ==
- Dennis Miller
