= Shibata Takumi =

Shibata Takumi can refer to:

- Shibata Takumi (fund manager)
- Shibata Takumi (politician)
