= Marian Osgood Hooker =

American physician

- Born: 1875; San Francisco, California U.S.
- Died: 1968 (aged 92–93); Santa Barbara, California U.S.
- Occupations: Physician; Photographer

Marian Osgood Hooker (1875–1968) was a physician and photographer in the early 20th century. She is known for her photographs of rural Italy, published in several books including Farmhouses and Small Provincial Buildings in Southern Italy.

== Early life ==
Hooker was born in San Francisco, California, to Katharine Putnam Hooker, the niece of famous geologist Josiah Dwight Whitney, and John Daggett Hooker, a direct descendant of Connecticut's founder Thomas Hooker. The family, which also included Marian's younger brother Laurence Whitney Hooker (1878–1894), moved to Los Angeles in 1886 to take advantage of the booming economy. John Hooker established a successful steel pipe manufacturer allowing the family to move to a mansion on well-known West Adams Street where they entertained famous scientists, poets, and authors, including John Muir, and who became close friends of Katharine Hooker.

Hooker attended the prestigious Marlborough School in Los Angeles where she studied art history under school founder Mary Caswell, graduating in 1894.

== Photography ==
In 1896, Hooker and her mother embarked on their first of five trips abroad. She documented her travels through Gibraltar, Madrid, Tangier, Italy, Austria, Germany, Switzerland, France, Belgium, Amsterdam, and England in a scrapbook. She and Katharine returned to Italy in 1899 and again in 1903. In 1913–1914, they travelled to Constantinople, England, Ireland, Egypt, and Italy, and in 1922 they made their final trip abroad to the Italian province of Apulia.

Hooker and her mother captured in image and writing the daily lives of the people they encountered. Marian's prints and illustrations were published in her mother's travel books Byways in Southern Tuscany, Wayfarers in Italy, and Through the Heel of Italy. In 1925, Marian published her own book of images called Farmhouses and Small Provincial Buildings in Southern Italy, which included introductions by Katharine and architect Myron Hunt. Hunt credited Farmhouses for inspiring some of his Mediterranean-style architecture.

Hooker was most prolific while traveling Europe, but continued making photographs at home and while traveling the United States. In 1903, John Muir asked her to hike up Mount Whitney with him and small group, scaling the mountain named after her maternal great uncle and geologist Josiah Dwight Whitney.

== Career ==
In 1910, Hooker earned a degree in medicine from the University of California, Berkeley. She became Dr. Martin Fischer's research assistant at the University of Cincinnati, co-authoring several scientific papers and continuing to collaborate with him after her return to become Assistant Medical Examiner at the University of California in 1912. She continued to practice and research until after her father's death when she moved in with her mother to care for her.

Hooker was a member of the San Francisco Women's Club, the San Francisco Women's Athletic Club, the Women's Club of Santa Barbara, the Sierra Club, the California Historical Society, and others. Marian died in 1968 in Santa Barbara.

== Bibliography ==
- Fischer, Martin H. and Marian O. Hooker. Fats and Fatty Degeneration: A Physico-chemical Study of Emulsions and the Normal and Abnormal Distribution of Fat in Protoplasm. New York: John Wiley & Sons, Inc., 1917.
- Fischer, Martin H. and Marian O. Hooker. The Lyophilic Colloids. C.C. Thomas, 1933.
- Fischer, Martin H., George D. McLaughlin and Marian O. Hooker. Soaps and Proteins: Their Colloid Chemistry in Theory and Practice. New York: John Wiley & Sons, Inc., 1921.
- Hooker, Katharine. Byways in Southern Tuscany. New York: Charles Scribner's Sons, 1918.
- Hooker, Katharine. Through the Heel of Italy. New York: Rae D. Henkle Co., Inc., 1927.
- Hooker, Katharine. Wayfarers in Italy. New York: Charles Scribner's Sons, 1901.
- Hooker, Marian Osgood. Farmhouses and Small Provincial Buildings in Southern Italy. New York: Architectural Book Publishing Co., 1925.
- Watts, Jennifer A. “Wayfarer In Italy: The Photography of Marian Osgood Hooker.” Southern California Quarterly, Vol. 85 No 1, Spring 2003: 83–100.

== Archives ==
There are two Marian Osgood Hooker Collections. One resides at San Diego State University and consists of two albums from 1894 to 1896 documenting Marian's early interest in photography while at the Marlborough School. The second is at the Environmental Design Archives and consists of 23 albums documenting her travels through Europe and California, as well as portraits, negatives, and a scrapbook. The Hooker Family Papers are at the Bancroft Library and contain correspondence between Marian and her mother, as well as other correspondence, family portraits, snapshots, and drawings.
