= Sumitomo Mitsui Trust Holdings =

Japanese financial holding company

Sumitomo Mitsui Trust Group, Inc. 三井住友トラストグループ株式会社
- Type: Public (KK)
- Traded as: TYO: 8309
- Industry: Financial services
- Founded: 2002; 24 years ago (as Chuo Mitsui Trust Holdings, Inc.)
- Headquarters: Tokyo, Japan
- Area served: Worldwide
- Key people: Kazuo Tanabe (President)
- Services: Personal banking Corporate banking Asset management Investment management
- Net income: JPY 83.7 billion (FY 2014)
- AUM: US$624 billion (2023)
- Total assets: US$989.7 billion (March 2022)
- Number of employees: 21,113 (2015)
- Subsidiaries: Nikko Asset Management
- Website: smth.jp/en

Sumitomo Mitsui Trust Group, Inc. (三井住友トラストグループ株式会社, Mitsui Sumitomo Torasuto Gurupu Kabushiki Gaisha), formerly Chuo Mitsui Trust Holdings, Inc., is a Japanese financial holding company headquartered in Chiyoda, Tokyo. It provides an assortment of financial products to retail and wholesale customers, with a focus on asset management, financial brokerage, and real estate services.

Its main operating company is Sumitomo Mitsui Trust Bank, Ltd (三井住友信託銀行株式会社, Mitsui Sumitomo Shintaku Ginkō Kabushiki Gaisha), which is the largest trust company and the fifth-largest bank in Japan measured by assets.

The company has no direct capital relationship with the Sumitomo Mitsui Financial Group; the two banking groups are similarly named because both are descended from the historical Sumitomo and Mitsui conglomerates.

There is just a weak control relationship between Sumitomo Mitsui Trust Holdings and Sumitomo Mitsui Financial Group. In fact SM Trust Holdings controls about 66% of Japan Trustee Services Bank. As of March 31, 2017, SM Financial Group's website reports that Japan Trustee Services Bank owned 5.50% of Sumitomo Mitsui Financial Group, but also 1.52% from trust location n. 1 (信託口1), 1.50% from trust location n. 2 (信託口2), 2.05% from location n. 5 (信託口5), 1.36% from trust location n. 7 (信託口7), and 1.85% from trust location n. 9 (信託口9) as well.

== History ==
=== Chuo Mitsui ===
SMT's earliest predecessor was Mitsui Trust Company Ltd, established in March 1924 with a capital of 30 million yen. In March 1948, it changed its name to Tokyo Trust & Banking Co., Ltd. It changed its name again to Mitsui Trust and Banking Company, Ltd in 1952.

The Chuo Trust & Banking Co., Ltd. was established in May 1962 with a capital of 2.5 billion yen and support from Tokai Bank, Dai-Ichi Bank, the Industrial Bank of Japan and other financial institutions. It took over Tokai and Dai-Ichi's trust businesses as well as the stock transfer agency business of Japan Securities Agents, Ltd. It acquired the Honshu operations of Hokkaido Takushoku Bank in 1998.

Mitsui Trust and Chuo Trust signed a merger agreement in May 1999 and completed their merger in April 2000, becoming Chuo Mitsui Trust and Banking Co., Ltd. (中央三井信託銀行株式会社). In 2001, Chuo Mitsui announced its plans to establish a new bank holding company known as Mitsui Trust Holdings, Inc., which was formed in February 2002. It changed its name to Chuo Mitsui Trust Holdings, Inc. (中央三井トラスト・ホールディングス株式会社) in 2007.

=== Sumitomo Trust ===
Sumitomo Trust Co., Ltd. was founded in July 1925 with capital of 20 million yen and its headquarters in Awajicho, Osaka. It changed its name to Fuji Trust & Banking Co., Ltd. in 1948 and adopted the name Sumitomo Trust and Banking Co., Ltd. (住友信託銀行株式会社) in 1952. In 1962 it moved its headquarters to the Sumitomo Building in Kitahama, Osaka.

=== Merger ===
Chuo Mitsui agreed to merge with The Sumitomo Trust and Banking Co., Ltd. in November 2009 and formed a holding company, Sumitomo Mitsui Trust Holdings, Inc., through a share exchange between Chuo Mitsui and Sumitomo Trust in April 2011. The three main trust banks under this holding company merged in April 2012 to form Sumitomo Mitsui Trust Bank, Ltd. SMTB became the largest trust bank in Japan and the fifth-largest commercial bank overall measured by assets.

SMTB was fined for insider trading in 2012 after a Chuo Mitsui fund manager was found to have traded on information leaked from Nomura Securities regarding a 2010 share issuance by Mizuho Financial Group.
