= Katharine Putnam Hooker =

American travel writer, philanthropist and socialite

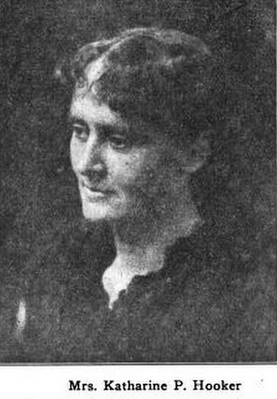
- Katharine Putnam Hooker, from a 1914 publication
- Born: May 2, 1849; Milwaukee, Wisconsin, US
- Died: January 7, 1935 (aged 85); Santa Barbara, California, US
- Occupation: Travel writer
- Spouse: John Daggett Hooker
- Children: 2

Katharine Putnam Hooker (May 2, 1849 – July 20, 1935) was an American travel writer, philanthropist, and socialite.

== Early life ==
Katharine Putnam was born in Milwaukee, Wisconsin, the daughter of Samuel Osgood Putnam and Elizabeth Noble Whitney. Her maternal uncles were Josiah Dwight Whitney, the Harvard geologist for whom Mount Whitney is named, and William Dwight Whitney, a noted Sanskrit scholar who taught at Yale. A few years after Katharine was born, Samuel Putnam sent for his wife and daughter to join him in San Francisco, where he was living during the California Gold Rush. Their ship sank in the San Francisco Bay, and four-year-old Katharine was among the passengers rescued by a whaling ship. In 1862 young Katharine survived a second shipwreck at Alcatraz Island. As a girl she was a close friend of Alice Howe Gibbens, who later married William James.

== Career ==
Katharine Putnam Hooker wrote four books on her travels in Italy: Wayfarers in Italy (1891, 1902), Byways in Southern Tuscany (1918), Farmhouses and Small Provincial Buildings in Southern Italy (1925), and Through the Heel of Italy (1927), all illustrated with photographs by her daughter, Marian Osgood Hooker.

The Hookers built an admired estate in the West Adams neighborhood of Los Angeles, and hosted events in their Italian-inspired gardens, designed by Myron Hunt, including children's festivals. Their frequent guests included naturalist John Muir, scholar David Starr Jordan, and astronomer George Ellery Hale. She served on the Progressive Party's National Committee representing California in 1914.

She happened to be visiting her elderly father in time to help him evacuate his burning house during the 1906 San Francisco earthquake, and to spend a week in an emergency camp for survivors. In widowhood Katharine Putnam Hooker moved back to San Francisco, where she lived with her daughter and with their friend, Alicia Mosgrove. The trio moved to Berkeley, California together, and then to Santa Barbara, California in 1924.

== Personal life and legacy ==
Katharine Putnam married John Daggett Hooker, a businessman, in 1869. They had two children: Lawrence Whitney Hooker died in 1894 while he was a student at Yale Law School. Marian Osgood Hooker became a physician and traveler, and was the first woman to climb Mount Whitney (in 1903, with a group that included John Muir). Katharine Putnam Hooker was widowed in 1911 and died in 1935, in Santa Barbara, aged 86 years. Her grave is in the Angelus-Rosedale Cemetery in Los Angeles.

The Hooker Family Papers are in the Bancroft Library. There is another collection at the Bancroft, of letters between John Muir and Katharine Putnam Hooker.
