= Immaculate Heart High School (Los Angeles) =

Immaculate Heart Middle & High School
- Immaculate Heart Convent and College – later High School c.1907

Location
- 5515 Franklin Avenue; Los Angeles, California 90028; United States; 34°6′20″N 118°18′35″W

Information
- Type: Private
- Motto: Maria Immaculata Spes Nostra (Immaculate Mary Our Hope)
- Religious affiliation: Catholic
- Established: 1906
- President: Maureen Diekmann
- Dean: Paul Pridgeon
- Principal: Naemah Morris (High School), Gina Finer (Middle School)
- Grades: preparatory through to final year of high school; 6-12
- Gender: Girls
- Enrollment: 550 High School; 200 Middle School (2015)
- Average class size: 21
- Student to teacher ratio: 17:1
- Colors: Navy and white
- Athletics: Basketball, Cross Country, Diving, Equestrian, Soccer, Softball, Swimming, Tennis, Track & Field, Volleyball, Fencing, Equestrian
- Athletics conference: CIF Southern Section; Sunshine League
- Mascot: Panda
- Nickname: Pandas
- Accreditation: Western Association of Schools and Colleges
- Newspaper: The Bamboo
- Yearbook: Cor Mariae
- Tuition: $23,950 plus fees (2024-2025)
- Communities served: Immaculate Heart Community
- Activities Director: Nicole Dunn
- Admissions Director: MJ Bautista
- Website: http://www.immaculateheart.org

Immaculate Heart Middle & High School is a private, Catholic, college preparatory day school for girls grades 6-12 in Los Angeles, California, United States. The school is located in the Los Feliz neighborhood, at the base of Griffith Park. There are approximately 200 students in the middle school (grades 6–8) and over 550 in the high school (grades 9–12).

== History ==
The school is located in the Archdiocese of Los Angeles. It was founded by the Sisters of the Immaculate Heart of Mary in 1906 as a girl's day and boarding school. Although the school remains on its original site, much of the original Spanish Mission style convent, classrooms and boarders' dormitories were torn down in 1973. The graduation ceremony for the senior class is traditionally held at the Hollywood Bowl. By far the majority of its more than 10,000 graduates have continued their education at colleges and universities across the country. They have served as artists, musicians, educators, journalists, doctors, lawyers, judges, and stars of stage and screen.

== Notable alumnae ==
- Lucie Arnaz, actress
- Tyra Banks, model and TV personality
- Elizabeth Baur, actress
- Charlotte Caffey, musician
- Pat Carroll, actress
- Linda Dangcil, actress
- Diane Disney, daughter of Walt and Lillian Disney
- Elliot Fletcher, actor and trans advocate
- Karen Gaviola, director
- Margaret McFall-Ngai, animal physiologist and biochemist
- Mary Tyler Moore, actress
- Ruth Nelson, actress
- Patricia Newcomb, film producer and publicist
- Gigi Perreau, actress
- Ione Skye, actress
- Yara Shahidi, actress
- Dakota Johnson, actress, attended the middle school
- Meghan, Duchess of Sussex, member of the British royal family, activist, philanthropist and former actress
- Janet Weiss, musician

== See also ==
- Immaculate Heart College
