= Ida Holterhoff Holloway =

American painter

- Born: Ida Holterhoff; August 22, 1865; Cincinnati, Ohio
- Died: February 3, 1950 (aged 84)
- Known for: Painting
- Spouse: George Clarence Holloway (m. 1894–1910)

Ida Holterhoff Holloway (August 22, 1865 or August 8, 1866 – February 3, 1950) was an American painter, designer and instructor known primarily for her watercolors and landscapes.

Ida Holterhoff was born in Cincinnati, Ohio, a daughter of Godfrey Holterhoff, a Prussian-born merchant, and his wife Helena. She attended the Cincinnati Art Academy where she studied with Frank Duveneck. In 1894 she married Captain George Clarence Holloway (deceased 1910). She taught art in San Francisco and Cincinnati beginning in the 1890s. She was a member of Cincinnati Association of Professional Artists; Cincinnati MacDowell Club; The Crafters Co.; Three Arts Club; Ohio WCS; and Porcelain League of Cincinnati. She was a founding member of Cincinnati Women's Art Club.

Her niece, Leila Holterhoff (1885–1968), was a concert singer and linguist.
