= Tokyo Midtown =

Mixed-use development in Japan

Coordinates: 35°39′57″N 139°43′52″E

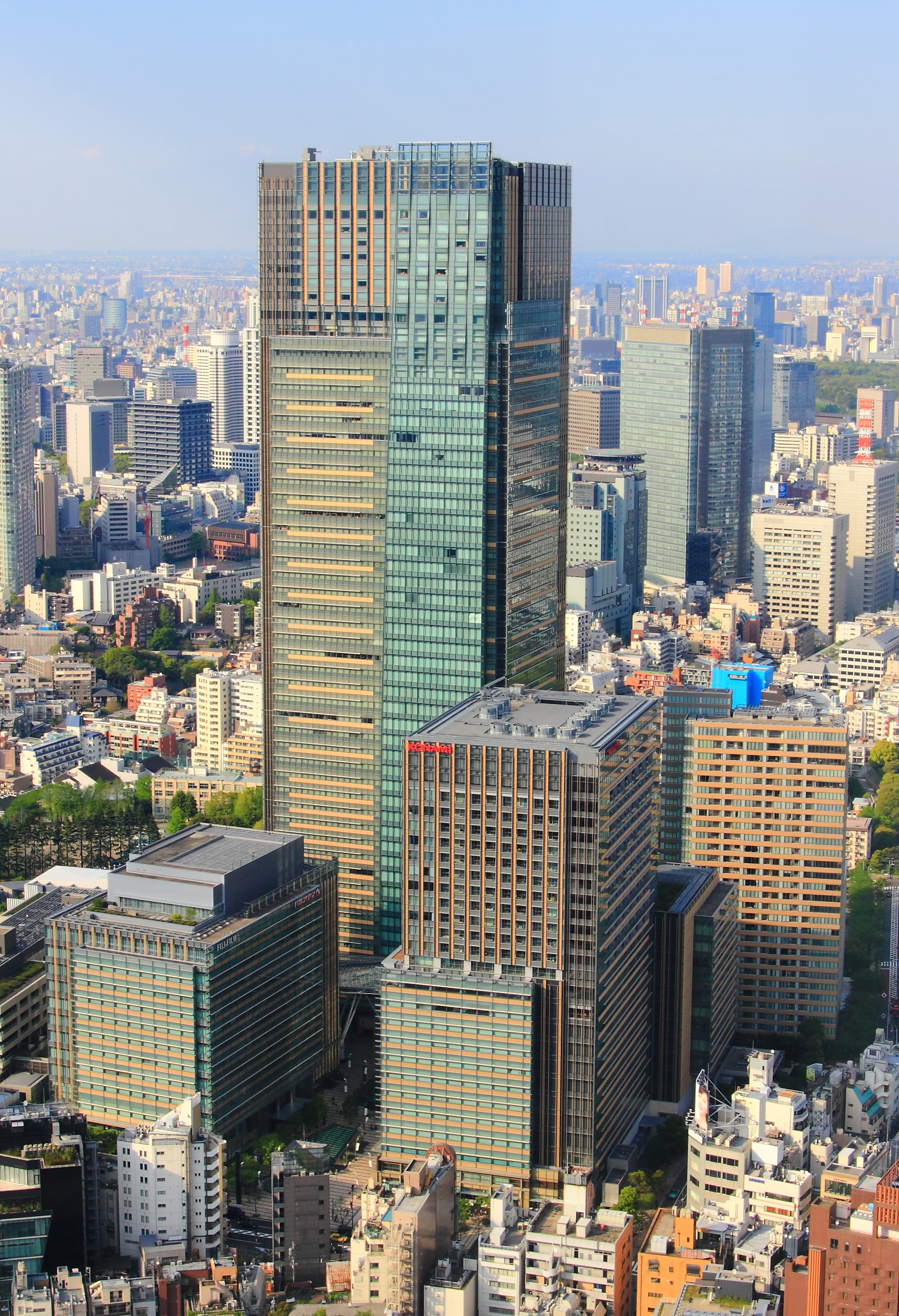
- Interactive map of Tokyo Midtown
- Location: 9 Akasaka; Akasaka, Minato, Tokyo, Japan
- Status: Complete
- Groundbreaking: May 18, 2004
- Constructed: 2004–2007
- Opening: March 30, 2007
- Use: Mixed
- Website: www.tokyo-midtown.com/en

Companies
- Architect: Skidmore, Owings & Merrill
- Developer: Mitsui Fudosan Co., Ltd
- Owner: Mitsui Fudosan Co., Ltd
- Manager: Tokyo Midtown Management Co., Ltd.

Technical details
- Cost: ¥370 billion ($3 billion)
- Buildings: 6
- Size: 10 hectare

Tokyo Midtown (東京ミッドタウン, Tōkyō Middotaun) is a 569,000-square-meter (6.1 million sq ft) mixed-use development in Akasaka, Tokyo, Japan. Completed in March 2007, the $3 billion (¥370 billion) project includes office, residential, commercial, hotel, and leisure space, and the new quarters of the Suntory Museum of Art. When completed, the Midtown Tower was the tallest building in Tokyo. The main building complex is surrounded by Hinokicho Park, a 10-acre public park containing green areas along with works of art.

The site takes up 78,000 square meters (19 acres) previously occupied by the Japan Defense Agency in Akasaka area of Minato, along Gaien Higashi and close to Roppongi Station, and less than a kilometer (half a mile) from the similarly scaled Roppongi Hills complex.

== Development ==
The primary developer was Mitsui Fudosan, working in concert with several partners. The project was designed by architectural firm Skidmore, Owings & Merrill; Nikken Sekkei is the local architect of record. Landscape architecture of the surrounding new 40,000 m^{2} (9.9 acres) public park was designed by EDAW, the Suntory Museum of Art by Kengo Kuma, and the design of the retail Galleria handled by the Colorado-based CommArts.

== Buildings ==
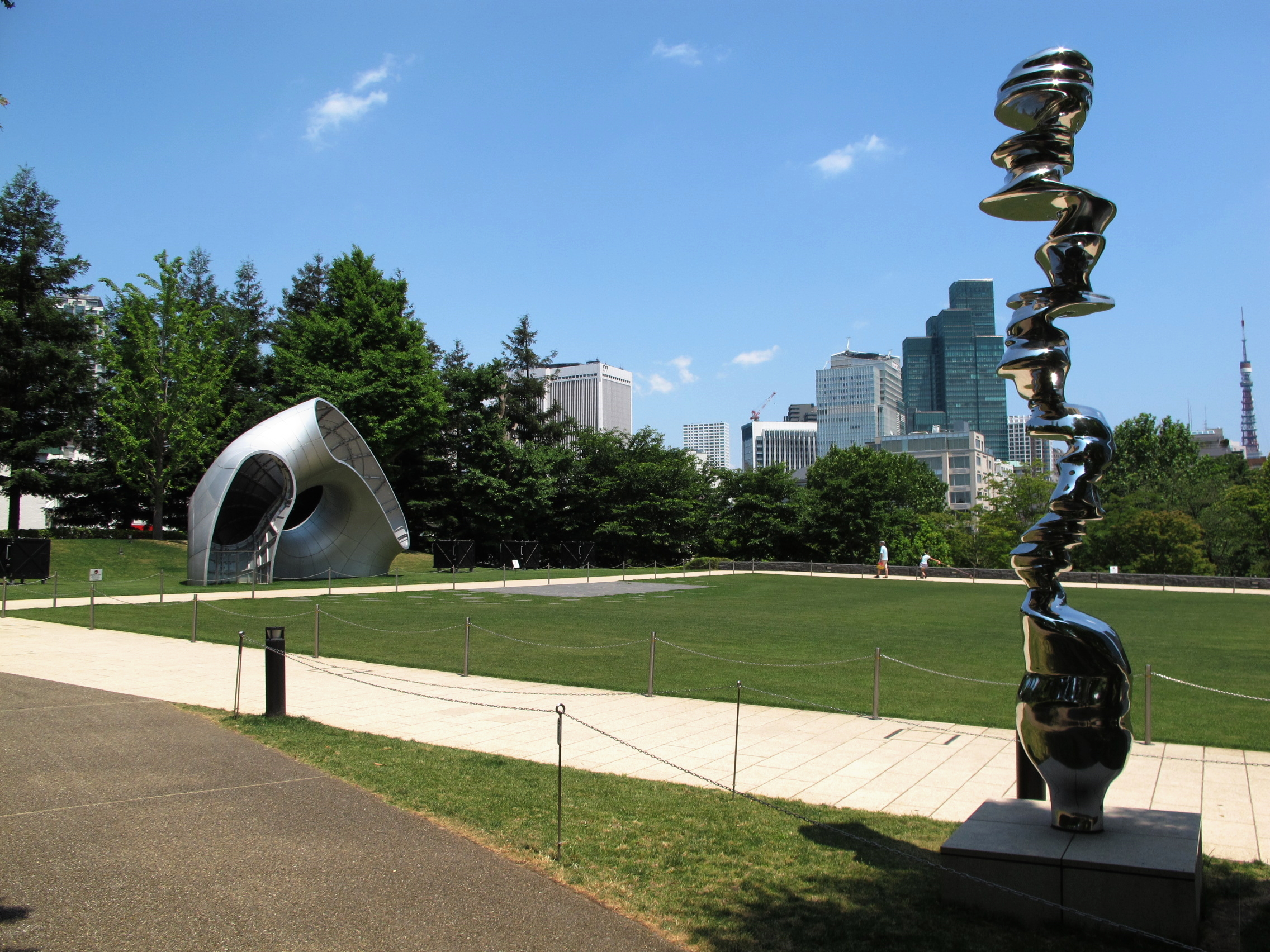
Midtown Garden Lawn

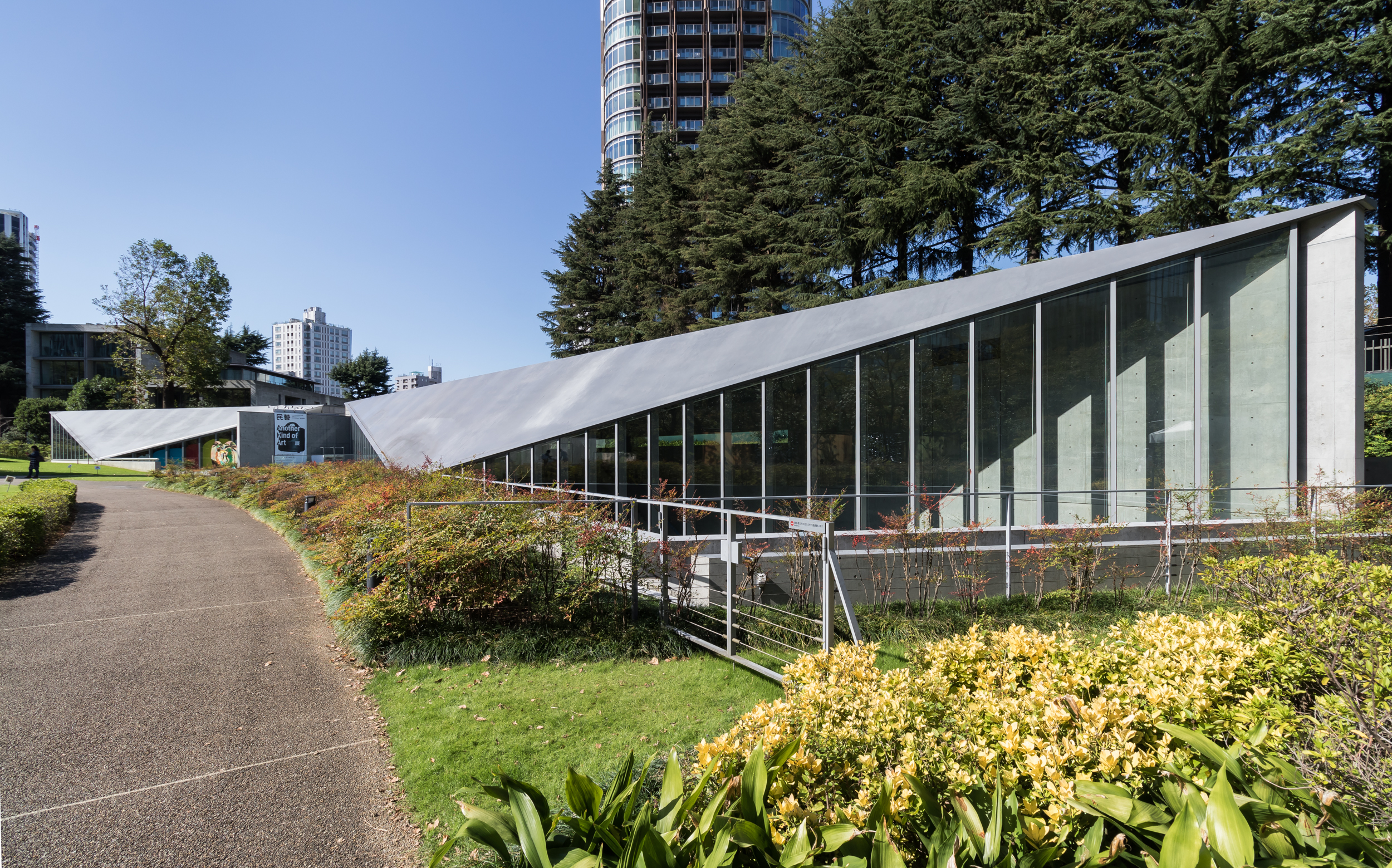
21_21 Design Sight. Design by Tadao Ando

- Midtown Tower is the second tallest building in Tokyo Prefecture at 248 meters (814 feet). It is the fifth-tallest in Japan, after Yokohama's Landmark Tower, Osaka's World Trade Center Building, Izumisano's Rinku Gate Tower Building, and the Tokyo Skytree. The building includes office space, condominiums, and, at the top floors, the Ritz-Carlton hotel. The tower was the headquarters of Hudson Soft.
- Midtown East
- Midtown West has the headquarters of Fujifilm and the headquarters of Fuji Xerox. The headquarters of Fuji Xerox moved to its current location on January 15, 2007.
- Parkside
- Midtown Front
- Midtown Gardenside (formerly known as Midtown West) will feature the Oakwood Premier Tokyo Midtown luxury serviced apartments.
- Galleria

== Tenants ==
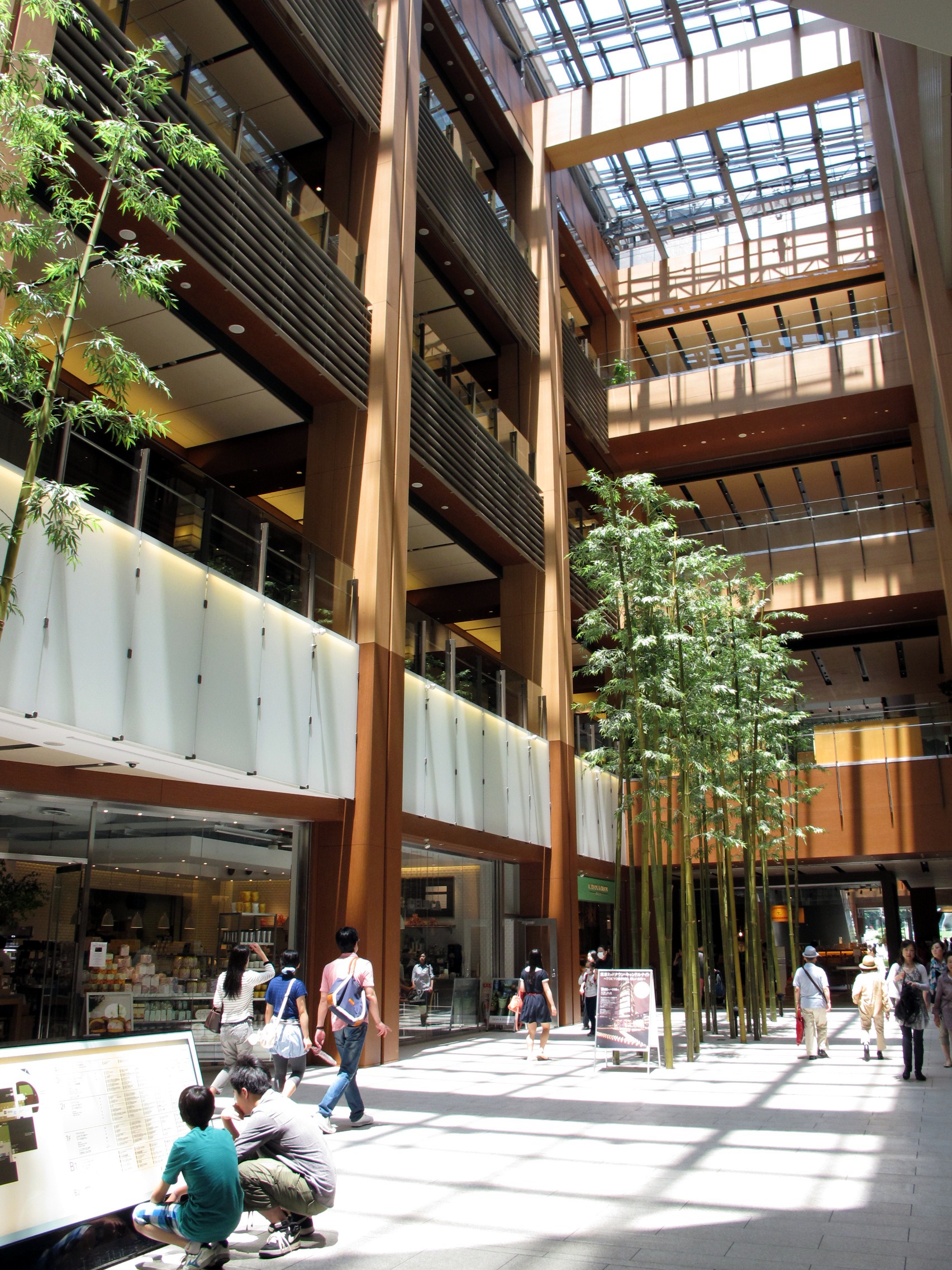
Inside the Galleria of Tokyo Midtown

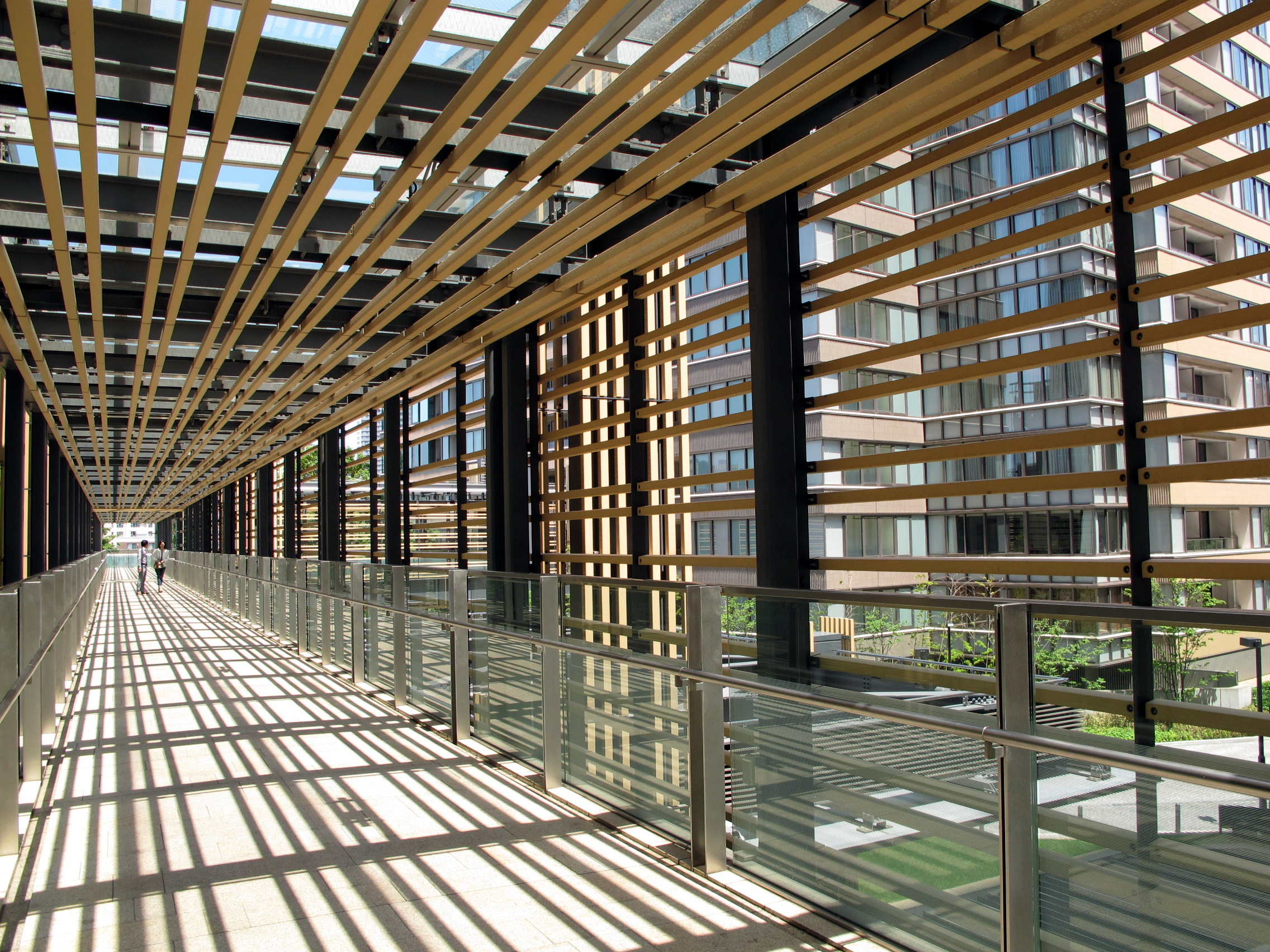
Cover-way inside Tokyo Midtown

The 330,000 square meters (3.5 million square feet) of office space includes as its main tenants Fujifilm, Fuji Xerox, Yahoo! Japan, Cisco Japan, Uniqlo, Nikko Asset Management and Konami, as well as a medical clinic affiliated with the U.S.-based Johns Hopkins Hospital. The luxury 250-room Ritz-Carlton Hotel occupies the 47th through 53rd floors of Midtown Tower, their first hotel in Tokyo, under a long-term lease arrangement. Other tenants include the international law firms Milbank, Tweed, Hadley & McCloy and Herbert Smith LLP.

The 5-floor retail Galleria, with 73,000 square meters (790,000 square feet) of stores, restaurants and shops includes the first Terence Conran restaurants in Japan, a wine bar (Coppola's Vinoteca) showcasing the wines of Francis Ford Coppola, and an outlet of high-end American food retailer Dean & DeLuca.

== 21_21 Design Sight ==
Tokyo Midtown is also the home of 21 21 Design Sight, a design gallery/workshop created by fashion designer Issey Miyake and architect Tadao Ando. "The idea was to create not only a museum that shows exhibits," says Ando, "but also a place for researching the potentiality of design as an element that enriches our daily life, a place that fosters the public's interest in design by arousing in them different sights and perspectives on how we can view the world and the objects surrounding us." The building, designed by Ando, is on the edge of the park area, and features 1,700 square meters (18,000 square feet) of floor space, including two galleries and an attached cafe run by chef and restaurateur Takamasa Uetake. The split-level concrete structure includes a hand-sanded steel roof (whose design was inspired by Issey Miyake's A-POC ("A Piece of Cloth") concept) and 14-meter (46-foot) long glass panels.

== History ==
The site of Tokyo Midtown was the home of the Mōri clan during the Edo period. In 1873 the Imperial Japanese Army established a camp on the site, which became home to units of the 1st Division following the Russo-Japanese War. In 1946, the United States Army took over the site and it was re-purposed as officer housing. The site was returned to Japan in 1960 and became known as Camp Hinokicho (JGSDF parlance) and Hinokicho Air Base (JASDF parlance), housing the headquarters of the Japan Defense Agency and various other command and control functions for the Japan Self-Defense Forces for the next forty years.

In 1988, the Japanese government authorized a large-scale relocation of various government agencies in order to re-develop prime government land for commercial purposes. As part of this plan, it was decided in the 1990s to move the JDA headquarters and re-develop the site. The base was formally closed in May 2000 and its functions were relocated to Ichigaya. A consortium of developers including Mitsui Fudosan, Sekisui House, and several life insurance companies won a public tender to purchase the site, paving the way for its development as Tokyo Midtown. Construction began in 2004 and was completed in 2007.

== See also ==
- List of tallest buildings and structures in Tokyo
