= Leila Holterhoff =

Soprano concert singer (1885–1968)

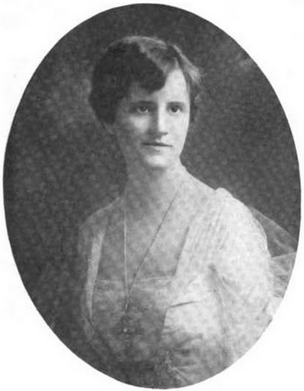
Leila Holterhoff, from a 1916 publication

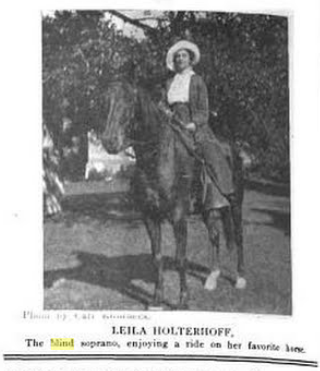
Leila Holterhoff on horseback, from a 1917 publication

Leila Holterhoff (October 29, 1885 – February 21, 1968) was an American soprano concert singer from Los Angeles, California, who later (as Leila Mosher) became a psychoanalyst, translator, and philanthropist.

== Early life ==
Leila S. Holterhoff was born in Dayton, Ohio and raised in the West Adams district in Los Angeles, the daughter of Godfrey Holterhoff Jr. and Louise Schaeffer Lewis Holterhoff. Her father was a railroad, oil, and banking executive. Her aunt, Ida Holterhoff Holloway, was a notable painter based in Ohio.

Leila Holterhoff was blind from infancy. She attended the Marlborough School in Los Angeles. She studied piano as a girl, but concentrated on voice and languages when she traveled to Paris, Florence, and Berlin for further studies, especially with Edgar Stillman Kelley. She also earned a California teaching certificate in Latin.

== Career ==
Holterhoff performed to acclaim in Berlin in 1910. In 1911 she gave a series of concerts to benefit the Grand Ducal Institute for the Blind. On her return to North America, Holterhoff performed across the United States in 1910s, sometimes billed as "the Helen Keller of music. After her Chicago debut at the Ziegfeld Theatre in 1917, where a reporter found "the quality of the voice is exceedingly sweet and this – coupled with an engaging gentleness of manner in the singer combines to make her thoroughly charming."

Later in 1917, she gave a concert at Aeolian Hall in New York to benefit "blind soldiers in France". She became interested in helping disabled veterans more directly. After studying medicine and psychology at Columbia University and earning a medical degree in the 1920s, Leila Mosher earned another professional degree from the University of Vienna. She co-authored a book in French with René Maublanc, on blindness. Using her fluency in European languages, she worked as a translator at the First International Conference for the Blind in New York in 1931, sponsored by the American Foundation for the Blind. Also in 1931, she also worked with the League of Nations in Geneva, for the International Bureau of Labor, on immigration issues.

== Personal life ==
She was married twice, first to Bernard George Heyn in 1923; they divorced in 1925. Her second marriage was to Evan Royal Mosher by 1927. She and Mosher adopted two children, Ann and Allen. Leila Holterhoff Mosher died in 1968, aged 82 years, in Coronado, California.
