= Catherine Mulholland (historian) =

American historian and author (1923–2011)

Catherine Rose Mulholland
- Born: 8 April 1923; Hollywood, California, U.S.
- Died: July 6, 2011 (aged 88); Camarillo, California, U.S.
- Education: University of California, Berkeley (B.A. English); Columbia University (M.A. English)
- Occupation: Historian · Author · Civic leader
- Years active: 1950s–2011
- Organizations: Los Angeles Water & Power Associates (board member)
- Known for: Historical scholarship on Los Angeles & San Fernando Valley; biographer of William Mulholland
- Notable work: Calabasas Girls: An Intimate History (1976); Owensmouth Baby: The Making of a San Fernando Valley Town (1987); William Mulholland and the Rise of Los Angeles (2000)
- Spouse: Gerard T. Hurley (m. 1949–1976)
- Children: Three

Catherine Rose Mulholland (April 8, 1923 – July 6, 2011) was an American historian and author. As the granddaughter of William Mulholland, she wrote extensively about Los Angeles history, especially the San Fernando Valley, and her grandfather’s role in the development of the city’s water system.

== Early life and education ==
Born in Hollywood, California in 1923, Catherine Mulholland grew up on her family's 600-acre ranch in the western San Fernando Valley. Her parents were Perry Mulholland, William's eldest son, and Addie, the daughter of Calabasas homesteaders. She attended multiple schools during her youth, including North Hollywood Junior High School, Marlborough School for Girls, and graduated from Canoga Park High School in 1940.

She studied musical improvisation with Lloyd Reese and became friends with bassist Charles Mingus. Mulholland later said that her friendship with Mingus affected her understanding of racial discrimination. Mulholland earned a degree in English from UC Berkeley and later a master’s from Columbia University. While studying at Columbia she became friends with Allen Ginsberg and Jack Kerouac. She also studied for a Ph.D. in English literature at UC Berkeley but did not finish her degree.

== Career ==
In the 1950s, Mulholland wrote a play about her early life, entitled A Wedding in the Valley, which won the James D. Phelan Award for significant accomplishments by young California writers and artists.

Beginning in 1976, Mulholland authored several books focusing on Los Angeles' history, including:

- Calabasas Girls: An Intimate History, 1885-1912 (1976), an account of the early days of Calabasas, California.
- Owensmouth Baby: The Making of a San Fernando Valley Town (1987), which chronicled the development of the community of Owensmouth, now known as Canoga Park.
- William Mulholland and the Rise of Los Angeles (2000), a biography of her grandfather that discussed his role in Los Angeles water development and disputed some accounts of his responsibility for the St. Francis Dam disaster. Ben Ehrenreich of L.A. Weekly criticized it for lacking deep insights and focusing largely on disproving conspiracy theories about Los Angeles’ acquisition of Owens Valley land and the construction of the aqueduct. Jonathan Kirsch of the Los Angeles Times praised it as a grand and graceful saga, while the New York Times described it as a well-balanced biography based on extensive research, including Mulholland’s personal office files. Historian Abraham Hoffman commended the author's thorough scholarship, noting that while some expected a biased account due to her family connection, she presented a comprehensive and honest portrayal.

In interviews, Mulholland disputed claims that her grandfather had participated in a conspiracy to acquire Owens Valley water. She acknowledged his responsibility for the St. Francis Dam disaster but rejected portrayals of him as acting primarily on behalf of powerful business interests. Her 2000 biography presented her interpretation of these controversies.

Mulholland also gave public lectures and served on the board of Los Angeles Water and Power Associates.

== Personal life ==
Mulholland had a brief romantic relationship with the poet Jack Spicer before she married Gerard T. Hurley in 1949, with whom she had three children. They later divorced in 1976.

Mulholland resided in Berkeley for most of her married life, only returning to Southern California after her divorce. She lived first in Thousand Oaks, then in Chatsworth for many years, and finally in Camarillo

== Death ==
Catherine Mulholland died on July 6, 2011, at her home in Camarillo, California, at the age of 88.

== Legacy ==
Mulholland donated her personal papers and archives, documenting several generations of her family as well as the office files of William Mulholland, to California State University, Northridge where they are preserved in the University Library in Special Collections and Archives.

In a speech in 1986, Mulholland shared her reasons for becoming a historian:

I realized that progress is a terrible destroyer. It's a builder, but it's also a destroyer. It's a destroyer of the past. If some of us don't put it down while we're still alive, it's going to get distorted and forgotten and fall through the cracks.
