= Byron Smith (American football) =

American football player (born 1962)

No. 91
- Position: Defensive end / Defensive tackle

Personal information
- Born: December 21, 1962 (age 63); Los Angeles, California, U.S.
- Listed height: 6 ft 5 in (1.96 m)
- Listed weight: 278 lb (126 kg)

Career information
- High school: Canoga Park (Los Angeles)
- College: California (1980–1983)
- Supplemental draft: 1984: 3rd round, 66th overall pick

Career history
- Saskatchewan Roughriders (1984)*; Indianapolis Colts (1984–1985); Los Angeles Raiders (1987)*
- * Offseason or practice squad member only
- Stats at Pro Football Reference

Byron Keith Smith (born December 21, 1962) is an American former professional football defensive lineman who played two seasons with the Indianapolis Colts of the National Football League (NFL). He was selected by the Colts in the third round of the 1984 NFL supplemental draft. He played college football at the University of California, Berkeley.

== Early life and college ==
Byron Keith Smith was born on December 21, 1962, in Los Angeles, California. He attended Canoga Park High School in Canoga Park, Los Angeles.

He was a member of the California Golden Bears of the University of California, Berkeley from 1980 to 1983 and a three-year letterman from 1981 to 1983.

== Professional career ==
After going undrafted in the 1984 NFL draft, Smith signed with the Saskatchewan Roughriders of the Canadian Football League. He suffered a thigh strain in May 1984. On July 17, 1984, it was reported that Smith had been granted a 21-day trial with the Roughriders. However, he did not end up playing in any games for the team during the 1984 CFL season.

In June 1984, Smith was selected by the Indianapolis Colts in the third round, with the 66th overall pick, of the 1984 NFL supplemental draft of USFL and CFL players. He was also selected by the Oakland Invaders in the 1984 USFL territorial draft. He signed with the Colts on October 3, 1984. Smith was released on October 15. He later re-signed with the Colts on November 28 and played in three games for the team during the 1984 season. He played in all 16 games, starting seven, for the Colts in 1985, recording three sacks. Smith was placed on injured reserve the next year on August 18, 1986. He was released on October 15, 1986.

Smith signed with the Los Angeles Raiders on March 17, 1987, before being released later that year.
