= Sunshine League =

High school athletic league in California

The Sunshine League is a high school athletic league that is part of the CIF Southern Section. Members are independent high schools in Los Angeles.

== Member schools ==
- Flintridge Sacred Heart Academy (La Cañada)
- Immaculate Heart High School (Los Feliz)
- Louisville High School (Woodland Hills)
- Marlborough High School (Hancock Park)
- Marymount High School (Bel Air)
- Notre Dame Academy (Los Angeles)
