= John Daggett Hooker =

American astronomer

John Daggett Hooker (c. 1838–1911), was an American ironmaster, amateur scientist and astronomer, and philanthropist who made the initial donations for the 100-inch Hooker Telescope, one of the most famous telescopes in observational astronomy of the 20th century.

== Life and career ==
Born John Delos Hooker in Hinsdale, New Hampshire, he moved to San Francisco, California in 1861. He married Katharine Putnam Hooker in 1869, and they had a daughter, Marian Osgood Hooker, in 1875 and a son, Laurence Whitney Hooker, in 1878. They moved to Los Angeles in 1886 where Hooker made his fortune in hardware and steel-pipe, rising to Vice President of Baker Iron Works. He then went on to serve as President of Western Union Oil Company. He founded the California Academy of Sciences.

Through a collaboration with George Ellery Hale, he brought a 10-inch telescope to the Mount Wilson Solar Observatory. He later partly funded the creation of the 100-inch reflector, with additional underwriting via the Carnegie Institute. A falling-out between Hooker and Hale lasted until Hooker's death in 1911, but the remaining funds were secured, and the telescope became operational in 1917.

Hooker was also an important benefactor to naturalist John Muir, who stayed at Hooker's home several times in 1910 and 1911, where he did much of his writing from that time.
