= Marlborough School (Los Angeles) =

Private pre school in California, US

Location
- 250 South Rossmore Avenue; Los Angeles, California 90004; United States; 34°04′12″N 118°19′37″W

Information
- Type: Private all girls middle school and high school
- Established: 1889; 137 years ago
- Head of school: Jennifer Ciccarelli
- Teaching staff: 72.5 (FTE) (2017–18)
- Grades: 7–12
- Enrollment: 533 (2017–18)
- Student to teacher ratio: 7.4:1 (2017–18)
- Colors: Purple , white , & yellow
- Athletics conference: CIF Southern Section; Sunshine League
- Nickname: Mustangs
- Newspaper: The UltraViolet
- Website: marlborough.org

Marlborough School is an independent college-preparatory secondary school for girls in grades 7 through 12 at 250 South Rossmore Avenue in the Hancock Park neighborhood of Los Angeles, California. Marlborough was founded in 1889 by New England educator Mary Caswell and is the oldest independent girls' school in Southern California.

== History ==
Mary S. Caswell, a young teacher from Maine, founded Marlborough in 1889 as "St. Margaret's School for Girls".

One year later, in 1890, the school moved from Pasadena to the city of Los Angeles. On October 1, 1890, the school opened at the corner of 23rd and Scarff Streets in the West Adams district. Occupying the empty Marlborough Hotel, the school adopted the name of its new location and was renamed the "Marlborough School for Girls".

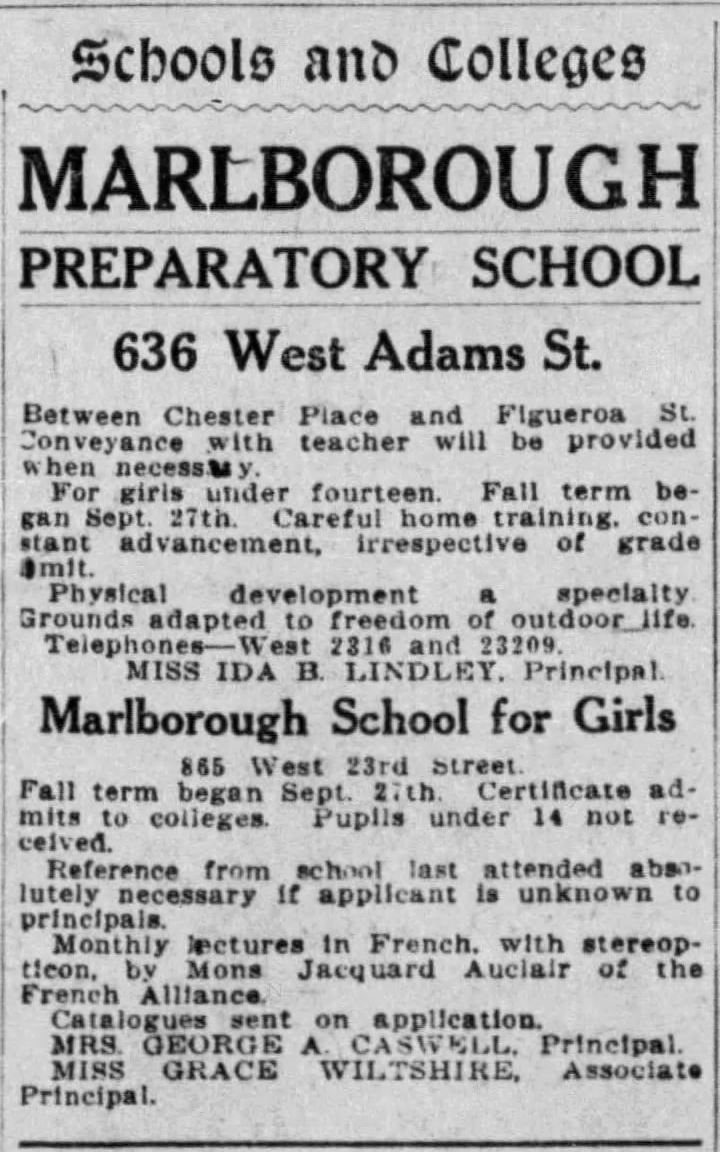
Marlborough School in the West Adams District, 1910

In 1916, Mrs. Caswell purchased land in the newly opened La Brea tract at a cost of $70,000. After 26 years in the West Adams district, the Marlborough School moved to Hancock Park and opened at its current site on the corner of Third Street and Rossmore Avenue.

Caswell led the school until 1924, when Ada Blake (recruited from Louisville Collegiate School) assumed its leadership. Blake expanded the curriculum substantially and the School gained a reputation for providing young women with an uncommonly rigorous education.

By the 1960s, the School was supported by a foundation and a board of trustees, who hired William Pereira and Associates to design new buildings. Several people within the Los Angeles business community supported the school in the latter half of the 20th century, with local businessmen, including Robert H. Ahmanson and Charlie Munger donating.

In 2014, a sexual misconduct investigation resulted in the imprisonment of a former teacher.

In 2015, Dr. Priscilla Sands was named head of school. Sands came to Marlborough after a career at the Agnes Irwin School and the Springside Chestnut Hill Academy, both independent schools in the Philadelphia area. In 2022, Jennifer Ciccarelli became the head of school after serving in the same role at the Columbus School for Girls in Columbus, Ohio.

== Academics ==
The student-to-teacher ratio at Marlborough School is approximately 8:1, lower than the national high school average of 11:1 and the public school average of 16:1. Over 80% of faculty members have more than ten years of teaching experience and almost 90% have advanced degrees. In recent years, several Marlborough graduates have attended college at elite institutions.

Marlborough ranked sixth in the nation among high schools with the highest standardized test scores according to Business Insider in 2014.

Recent guest speakers at Marlborough include Queen Rania of Jordan, former Secretary of State Madeleine Albright, Pulitzer Prize-winning New York Times columnist Nicholas Kristof, historian Edward L. Ayers, Nobel Prize Laureate Leymah Gbowee, and producer/actor Mindy Kaling.

== Notable alumnae ==
- Anne Archer – film and television actress
- Carolin Babcock – tennis player
- Katherine Bashford – landscape architect
- Camilla Belle – film and television actress
- Betsy Bloomingdale – philanthropist and fashion icon
- Cornelia Butler – museum curator (currently Chief Curator at the Hammer Museum)
- Joan Riddell Cook – newspaper journalist and editor, trade union leader, and a founding director of JAWS (Journalism and Women Symposium)
- Jacqueline Emerson – actress and singer
- Sabaah Folayan – award-winning documentary filmmaker
- Olivia Jade Giannulli and Bella Giannulli (transferred after 9th and 10th grade)
- Suzanne Goin – chef and restaurateur
- Kate Grace – Olympic finalist in the women's 800m
- Dolly Green – philanthropist and thoroughbred owner
- Sophie Hall-Mochkatel – producer, editor and production designer.
- Leila Holterhoff – singer, linguist, psychoanalyst
- Marian Osgood Hooker – physician and photographer
- Caroline Howard Hume – art collector and philanthropist
- Lois January – film actress
- Marion Jorgensen – philanthropist and civic leader
- Zoe Kazan – actress and playwright
- Jessica Levinson – law professor and political commentator
- Diane Disney Miller – author, philanthropist, and vintner, daughter of Walt Disney
- Peggy Moffitt – model and actress (famous for associations with Rudi Gernreich)
- Catherine Mulholland – historian and author
- The daughters of President Richard Nixon (Tricia Nixon Cox and Julie Nixon Eisenhower) briefly attended in the early 1960s
- Abi Olajuwon – WNBA player and college basketball coach
- Melissa Rivers – actress, television host and producer (attended but transferred for tenth grade)
- Sasha Spielberg – actress and musician, daughter of Steven Spielberg
- Alex Witt – MSNBC news anchor
- Leigh Bardugo – young adult and fantasy author

== Notable faculty and staff ==
- Josh Deu – musician and songwriter, co-founding member of indie rock band Arcade Fire
- Gertrude Gogin – former YWCA national secretary for girls' programs, joined the Marlborough faculty in 1938
- George Toley – tennis coach (later at University of Southern California)

== Pop culture mentions ==
Marlborough has been mentioned in the shows Ray Donovan and Red Band Society.
