= Jessica Levinson =

Law professor and Legal analyst

Jessica Levinson is a professor of law and a political-legal analyst at Loyola Law School in Los Angeles, where she teaches Constitutional Law, the First Amendment, Election Law, and privacy torts.

Levinson is also involved with various television shows and programs. She is a legal contributor for CBS News, where she provides legal analysis about the Supreme Court and other legal news. She is also currently hosted on the weekly segment "Who Decides?" at CBS 24/7, which explains and analyzes contemporary questions related to the Constitution. In addition, Levinson serves as a legal analyst for KTLA, where she has a weekly segment on Thursday evenings. She also appeared on the NPR family station KCRW for its "Legal Eagle" segment, discussing current American legal issues and topics. Levinson is a columnist for MSNow.

== Life and career ==
Levinson attended Marlborough School before going to Loyola Marymount University and graduating as the class valedictorian. She then graduated cum laude from Loyola Law School, where she was the Senior Articles Editor of the Loyola of Los Angeles International and Comparative Law Review. Levinson served as a law clerk to James V. Selna of the Central District of California following graduation. Prior to joining Loyola Law School as a full-time faculty member, she practiced with the law firm of Simpson Thacher & Bartlett LLP and served as the Director of Political Reform at the Center for Governmental Studies.

Levinson has also published a number of law review articles. These articles discuss issues related to campaign finance law, corporate personhood, ballot access and ballot initiatives.

== Publications ==
=== Peer-reviewed articles ===
- Levinson, J.A., 2012. The Original Sin of Campaign Finance Law: Why Buckley v. Valeo is Wrong. University of Richmond Law Review, 47, pp. 881–937.
- Levin, J.A., 2011. We the Corporations: The Constitutionality of Limitations on Corporate Electoral Speech after Citizens United. University of San Francisco Law Review, 46, pp. 307–358.
- Levinson, J.A., 2010. Timing is Everything: A New Model for Countering Corruption without Silencing Speech in Elections. St. Louis University Law Journal, 55, pp. 853–886.
- Levinson, J.A. and Stern, R.M., 2009. Ballot Box Budgeting in California: The Bane of the Golden State or an Overstated Problem? Hastings Constitutional Law Quarterly, 37(4), pp. 689–744.
