= Flintridge Sacred Heart Academy =

American private Catholic school

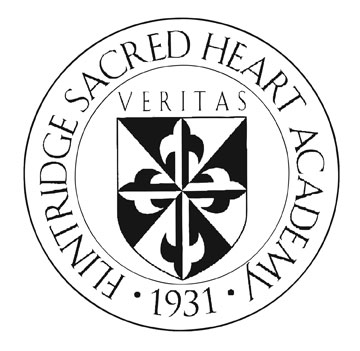

Location
- 440 Saint Katherine Drive; La Cañada Flintridge, Los Angeles County, California 91011; United States; 34°10′49″N 118°11′8″W

Information
- Type: Private, Day & Boarding
- Motto: Veritas (Truth)
- Religious affiliation: Roman Catholic
- Established: 1931
- Oversight: Dominican Sisters of Mission San Jose
- President: Marlena Conroy
- Principal: Rebecca Bostic
- Grades: 9-12
- Gender: Girls
- Colors: Red, Black and White
- Song: "Alma Mater"
- Athletics conference: CIF Southern Section; Sunshine League
- Mascot: Teddy Tolog (Bear)
- Nickname: Tologs
- Accreditation: Western Association of Schools and Colleges
- Publication: Verité (literary magazine)
- Newspaper: Veritas Shield
- Yearbook: Veritas
- Endowment: $2,000 (day) $6,000 (boarding)
- Tuition: $27,650 (day) $61,740 (boarding)
- Academic Dean: Kathy Desmond
- Website: http://www.fsha.org

Flintridge Sacred Heart Academy (also known as FSHA) is a private, all-girls Catholic high school in the Roman Catholic Archdiocese of Los Angeles run by the Dominican Sisters of Mission San Jose. It is located in La Cañada Flintridge, California, on a 41 acres (170,000 m^{2}) campus near the San Gabriel Mountains.

The school serves both as a day school and a boarding school, with 12% of the student population living on campus.

== Campus ==
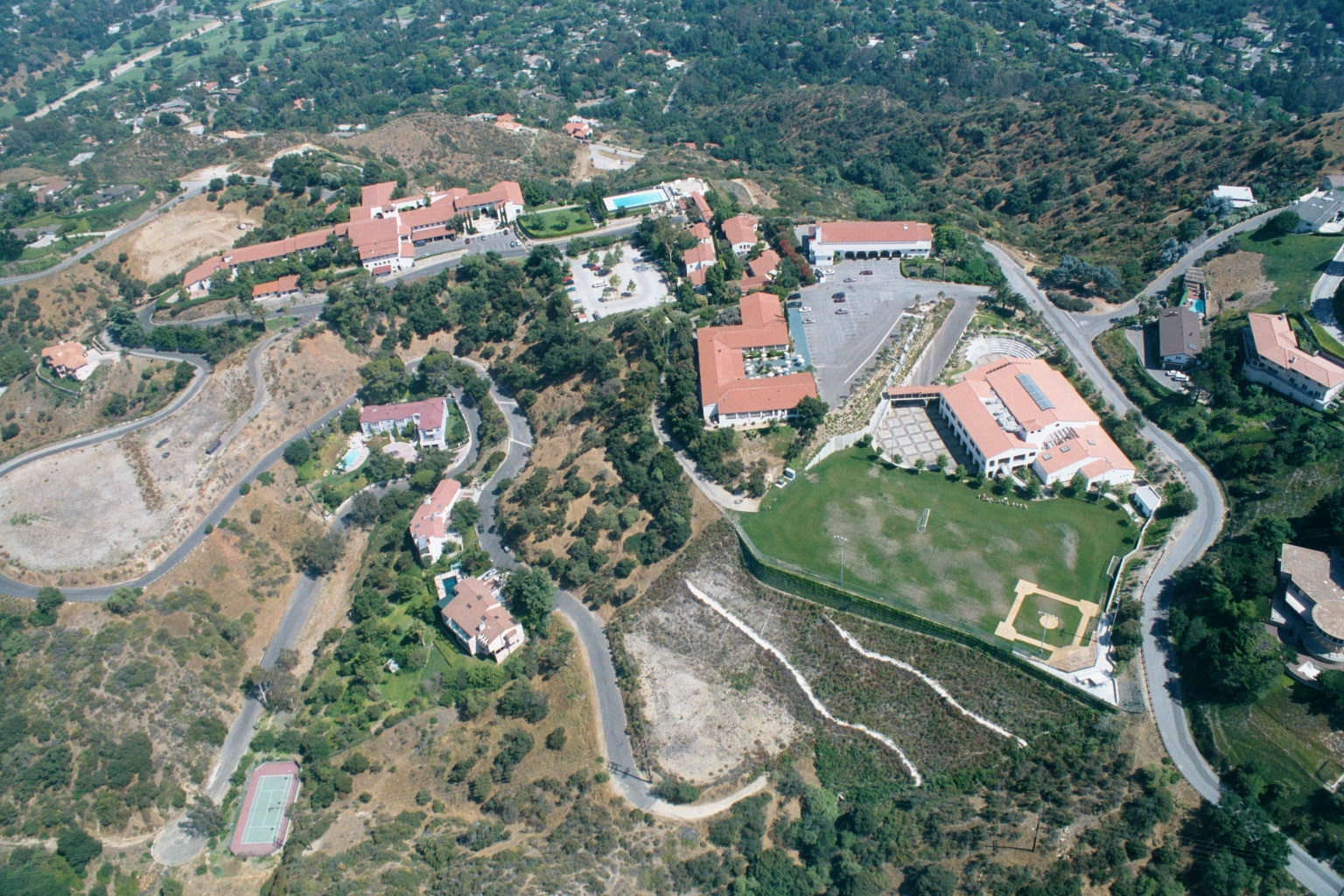
An aerial view of the FSHA campus, from the Student Activities Center and Crane Field on the right to the Administration Building and convent on the left.

=== Hotel ===
FSHA’s 41-acre campus was originally the site of the Flintridge Hotel, which was designed and built by architect Myron Hunt in 1926 atop the San Rafael Hills, at the direction of Frank Putnam Flint, a United States senator from what was then called La Cañada. Flint owned the land on which the hotel was built and commissioned Hunt, due to his expertise in designing in the Mediterranean Revival and Spanish Colonial Revival architecture styles. The Flintridge Hotel, soon acquired by Bowman-Biltmore Hotels, was then renamed the Flintridge Biltmore Hotel. It included a large main building with a dining room, lounge and patio, in addition to six smaller cottages meant to house whole families. The grounds also included a pool, tennis courts, golf course, archery range and several large lawn areas. The business failed as the Great Depression continued, and the hotel was closed and sold in 1931.

=== School ===
After the Dominican Sisters of Mission San Jose took over the property in 1931, the hotel was converted into a school exclusively for boarding students in grades 1-12. The billiards and game room became a chapel, the hotel's beauty salon became the head administrator's office, the bridal suite became a community room for the Sisters, and the Green Room (formerly a ballroom) was converted into a recreational room for students. The main dining room, with wood paneling and chandeliers, is virtually unchanged from 1927 and still used by both boarding students and the Sisters. Senator Flint originally owned many of the furnishings and decorations that remain in the original hotel building.

In the school's early days, all students were boarders and classes were taught in the hotel building; the cottages were used as dorms. Beginning in 1945, a decision was made to begin saving money to build a new structure for classrooms. In 1950, the decision was made to build a new high school building, which cost $210,000 and was completed in 1951. The Class of 1952 became the first senior class to occupy the new high school building. The building had three state-of-the-art science laboratories, a new library and spacious classrooms.

In November 1955, the Sisters voted to borrow $100,000 to build an auditorium. The academic year of 1956-57 marked the first year the student body was able to utilize this new auditorium. This new building allowed for expanded performances of plays on a stage instead of the lounge. The old elementary school building on Palmerstone Drive, formerly servants' quarters for hotel employees, was later sold as a private residence.

The area known as the Octagon, which was located between the pool and pedestrian bridge, once served as a music conservatory. A fire in 1971 damaged the building so severely that it was torn down.

Today, the only parts of the old Flintridge Biltmore hotel in use for student instruction are an art studio in the Annex of the old hotel and the upper part of Cottage 4, which houses music instruction. Due to the greater needs of the school, Flintridge Sacred Heart was able to expand its science and athletics facilities in 1998. A new 26,000-square-foot (2,400 m2) Student Activities Center opened on campus, which houses three state-of-the-art science classrooms with labs, a gymnasium, aerobics room, exercise room, training room, multipurpose athletic field and amphitheater. With the completion of the Student Activities Center in 1998, the science laboratories in the high school building were transformed into regular classrooms. The cottages now house school services such as admissions, technology and development.

The campus of Flintridge Sacred Heart is transected by the Pasadena—La Cañada Flintridge border, with the Glendale border less than a mile away. The school’s street and mailing address remain in La Cañada Flintridge. The area is commonly known within the FSHA community as “the Hill” – the campus sits atop the crest of the San Rafael Hills.

== History ==
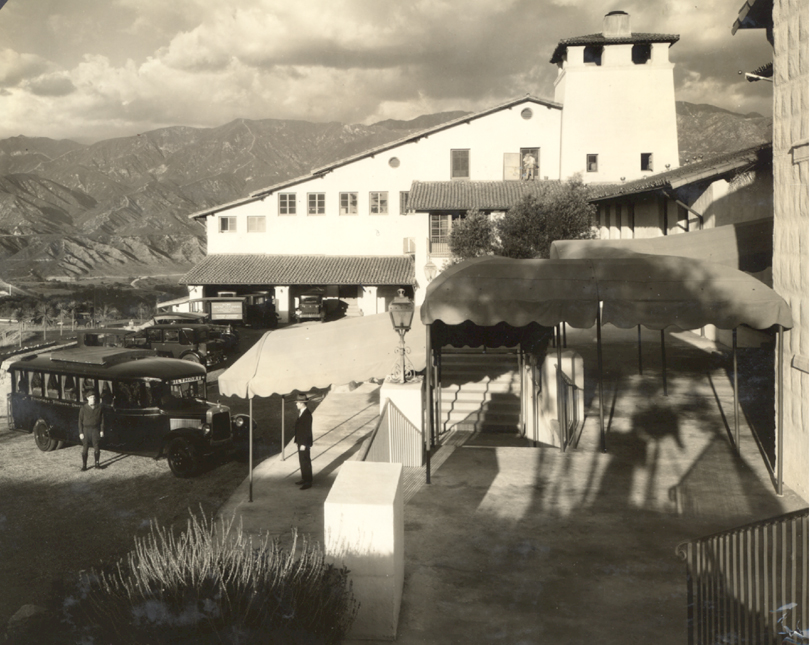
The main structure of the Flintridge Hotel, later the Flintridge Biltmore, shortly after its opening in 1927. This building now serves as the main Administration Building at Flintridge Sacred Heart Academy and houses the Dominican Sisters and boarding students.

Senator Flint opened the Flintridge Hotel on December 14, 1927. He soon sold the unprofitable hotel to the Biltmore hotel chain, which reopened the property on December 20, 1928. Yet with less than a dozen guests at any one time, and compounded by the Great Depression, the Flintridge Hotel never succeeded as a resort. When the economy dramatically declined in 1929 and following years, the hotel could not survive. Bankruptcy was declared and the buildings were vacant for almost two years.

At the same time, the Dominican Sisters of Mission San José were planning to build a convent and boarding school in Pasadena and heard about the Flintridge Hotel property. Archbishop James Cantwell contacted Mother Dolorosa at the Sacred Heart Convent in Los Angeles. Mother Dolorosa requested the support of the Motherhouse at Mission San José and permission to pursue what she felt was “a perfect site for a boarding school.” The asking price for the entire resort was $150,000, but the Prioress General’s answer was initially negative. Undeterred by this response, Mother Dolorosa and Sister Thomasina went back to “The Hilltops” and waited to show the Prioress General, Mother Seraphina Mertz, the former hotel. The Prioress General saw the hotel, but turned down the offer. Mother Dolorosa was still determined and so returned to the Motherhouse where she persuaded Mother Seraphina to “come and see the property” a second time. Both traveled south to Los Angeles to visit the site and finally agreed on a decision. With the approval of Mother Seraphina and her Council, Flintridge Sacred Heart Academy Corporation was established on July 24, 1931. The officers were elected and the first order of business was the decision to take out a loan from the Security First National Bank of Los Angeles in the amount of $150,000 to purchase the entire hotel, six outlying guest cottages and 54 acres (220,000 m2). The deed was signed at the Motherhouse on St. Dominic’s Day, August 4, 1931.

On Saturday, August 15, 1931, the feast of the Assumption of the Blessed Virgin Mary, the Dominican Sisters, headed by Mother Dolorosa, foundress and first superior of Flintridge Sacred Heart Academy; Sister M. Frances, pioneer and first principal; and Sister Thomasina took permanent possession of their new home. Legend has it that the women’s car broke down on the drive up to the property, so they walked the rest of the way in their heavy wool habits carrying only a $5 bill and a statue of Mary. The next day, after Holy Mass, a breakfast was served for the almost 2,000 people who came to visit the site. Many of the visitors were parents who registered their daughters. September 2 marked the first day of classes for 200 students in grades 1 through 12 under the direction of the Sisters, along with many new teachers. The school was exclusively for boarders until after the new high school building was constructed in 1951.

In the mid 1950s, Christina Crawford, adopted daughter of Joan Crawford, attended the school, according to her book Mommie Dearest and an article in Redbook called, "The Revolt of Joan Crawford's Daughter."

At about the same time, the school began to phase out the elementary grades, and the elementary school was closed in 1963.

== Notable alumnae ==
- Christina Crawford (1956)
- Gage Golightly (2012)
- Brianne Howey (2007)
- Katie Johnson (footballer) (2012)
- Barbara Ling (1970)
- Caitlin McHugh (2004)
- Kayla Mills (2013)
