= Gertrude Gogin =

American educator

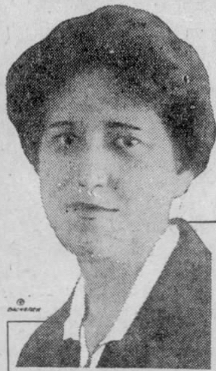
- Gertrude Gogin, from a 1922 newspaper.
- Born: Eleanor Gertrude Gogin; March 23, 1885; Boston, Massachusetts, US
- Died: February 5, 1967 (aged 81); Beverly Hills, California, US

Eleanor Gertrude Gogin (March 23, 1885 – February 6, 1967) was an American educator, and a national secretary of the YWCA, in charge of the organization's programming for girls and young women from 1918 to 1927.

== Early life ==
Gertrude Gogin was born in Boston, Massachusetts, and lived in Brookline, the daughter of George W. Gogin and Matilda Allen Gogin. Her father worked in the steel industry, and her grandfather Thomas Gogin was head of the Norway Iron Works in Massachusetts. She graduated from Vassar College in 1908. In 1910 she earned a master's degree in history at Columbia University.

== Career ==
Gogin taught one year (1908–1909) in St. Joseph, Louisiana, and at the Baldwin School in Pennsylvania in 1914. Soon after, she was a national secretary of the YWCA. In 1918 she was national head of the Girls' Division, responsible for the organization's wartime "Victory Girls" program. In 1919 Gogin wrote manuals for YWCA programs for various age levels, including the Rainbow Club for schoolgirls, the Girl Reserves for teens, and the Be Square Club for young working women.

She lectured across the United States often. She addressed a national YWCA meeting in San Francisco in 1922, on the topic of flappers: "Why rail at the flapper? She is as good and as true as any girl of any time. She is but the product of the present and the conditions of the present," she explained. She wrote articles for Rural Manhood, The Church School Journal, The Vassar Miscellany, and other publications.

Gogin resigned from the YWCA in 1927. She returned to school work, and by 1933 became principal of the Santa Barbara Girls' School in California. The school closed in 1938; she taught at the Marlborough School in Los Angeles after that. Gogin was president of the Vassar Club of Southern California in 1950, and still on the board of the organization in 1958.

== Personal life ==
Gogin and her friend, fellow teacher Minnie Bertha Smith, bought a vacation house together in Carmel in 1931, and spent time there during the winter school holiday in 1936. Gogin was named as Smith's "beloved friend" in a brief notice when Smith died in 1945. Gogin died in 1967, aged 81 years, in Beverly Hills, California. She left a large bequest to Vassar College.
