= Cathie Wood =

American investor and businesswoman

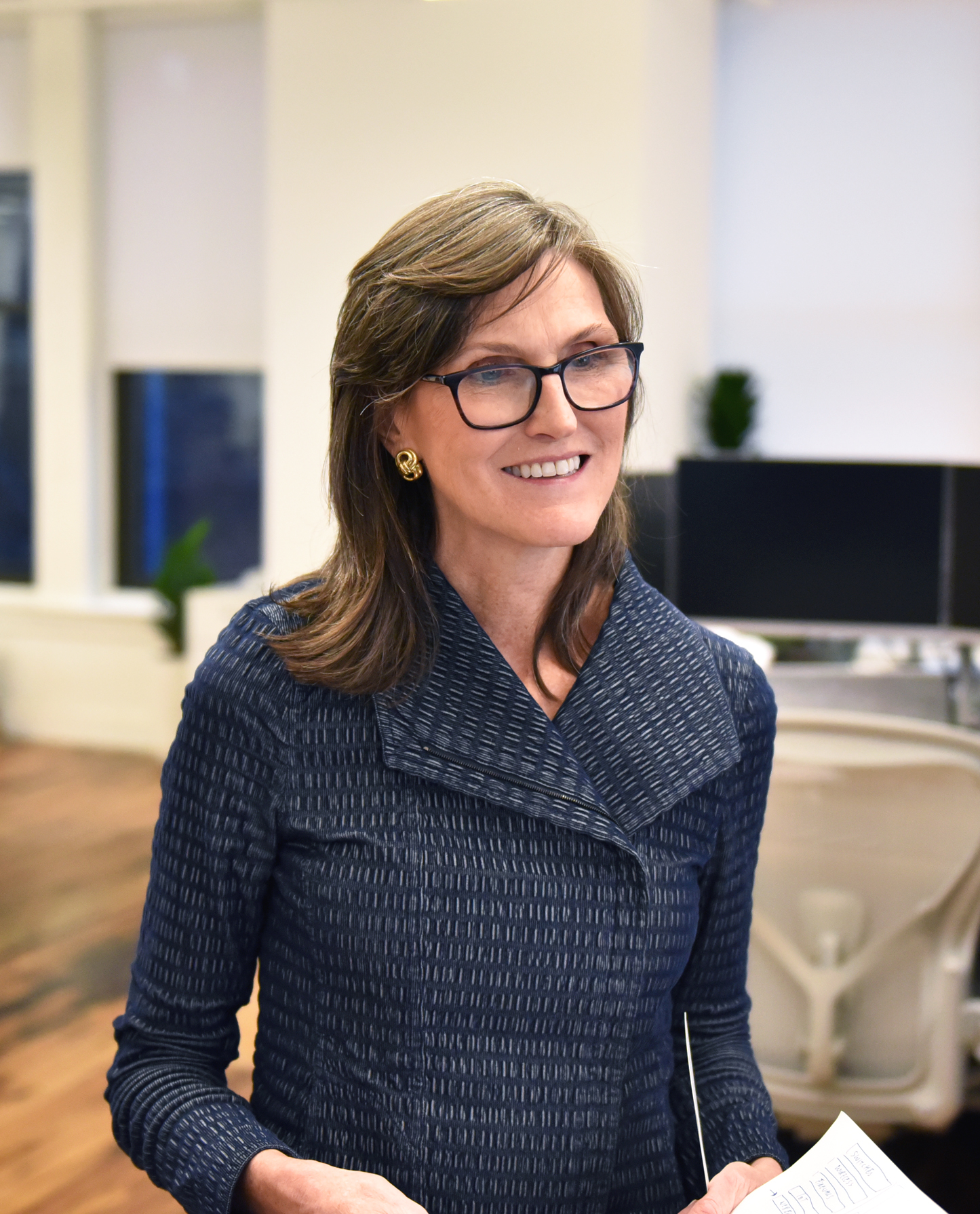
- Wood in 2020
- Born: Catherine Duddy; 1955 (age 70–71); Los Angeles, California, U.S.
- Education: University of Southern California (BS)
- Occupation: CEO of Ark Invest
- Spouse: Robert Wood (divorced)
- Children: 3

Catherine Duddy Wood (born 1955) is an American investor who is the cofounder and chief executive officer (CEO) of Ark Invest, an investment management firm. Her funds have had mixed results over the years, and have been called rollercoaster rides.

Her flagship ARK Innovation exchange-traded fund (ETF) has received accolades for its performance in 2017, 2020, 2023, and 2025, but was also considered by Morningstar to be the third highest "wealth destroyer" investment fund from 2014–2023.

== Early life and education ==
Wood was born in Los Angeles, the eldest child of Gerald and Mary Duddy, immigrants from Ireland. Wood's father served in the Irish Army and the United States Air Force as a radar systems engineer. In 1974, Wood graduated from Notre Dame Academy in Los Angeles, an all-girls Catholic high school. In 1981, Wood graduated summa cum laude from the University of Southern California, with a Bachelor of Science degree in finance and economics. One of Wood's professors was economist Arthur Laffer, advisor to Presidents Ronald Reagan and Donald Trump, who became Wood's mentor.

== Career ==
In 1977, via her mentor Arthur Laffer, Wood got a job as an assistant economist at Capital Group, where she worked for three years. In 1980, she moved to New York City to take a job at Jennison Associates as chief economist, analyst, portfolio manager and managing director. She worked there for 18 years. In the early 1980s, she debated economist Henry Kaufman on why she believed interest rates had peaked.

In 1998, along with Lulu C. Wang, Wood co-founded Tupelo Capital Management, a hedge fund based in New York City.

In 2001, she joined AllianceBernstein as CIO of global thematic strategies, where she worked for 12 years, managing $5 billion. She was criticized for performing worse than the overall market during the 2008 financial crisis.

=== ARK Invest ===
In 2014, after her idea for actively managed exchange-traded funds (ETFs) based on disruptive innovation was deemed too risky by AllianceBernstein, Wood left the company and founded ARK Invest. The company is named after the Ark of the Covenant; Wood was reading the One-Year Bible at the time. In 2014, ARK's first four ETFs were seeded with capital from now-convicted fraudster Bill Hwang of now-defunct Archegos Capital.

Her funds have had mixed results over the years, and have been called rollercoaster rides. For the 10 years ending on December 31, 2023, Morningstar ranked ARK Invest Funds as the worst "wealth destroyer" family of funds, based on the "decline in assets in dollar terms, after excluding inflows or outflows."

In 2020, her flagship ARK Innovation (ARKK) exchange-traded fund (ETF) was the top-performing global equity fund with at least $1 billion of assets, and Wood was subsequently named the best stock picker of 2020 by Bloomberg News editor-in-chief emeritus Matthew A. Winkler. In 2023, ARKK was the top-performing actively traded U.S. diversified ETF. However, ARKK fell 24% in 2021 and, in the first quarter of 2022, it was the worst performer among equity funds covered by Morningstar, Inc. For the 10 years ended December 31, 2023, it generated a 122% return, less than half of the Nasdaq-100's 330% return.

In late June and July 2025, Cathie Wood’s Ark Investment sold $47.9 million worth of Coinbase shares (137,075 shares) after the stock surged 37% in the preceding month, buoyed by optimism around crypto regulation and new product launches. Despite the sale, Coinbase remains the second-largest holding in Ark’s flagship Innovation ETF, accounting for 8.4% of the portfolio. Ark’s funds rebounded in 2025, with ARKK up 23.4% through Q3, far outpacing the S&P 500's 6.8% gain.

In January 2026, Morningstar ranked ARKK as the fifth best performing ETF of 2025, with ARK funds taking four of the top five spots.

== Awards and honors ==
Wood was selected for the inaugural 2021 Forbes 50 Over 50; made up of entrepreneurs, leaders, scientists, and creators who are over the age of 50.

== Personal life ==
Wood lives in St. Petersburg, Florida. She was divorced from Robert Wood, who died in 2018. She has three children.

Wood is a devout Christian. During the 2020 election, she warned that Joe Biden's plan of taxation and regulation would stifle innovation. In 2018, she donated funds to her high school to start the Duddy Innovation Institute, which encourages girls to study disruptive innovation. Wood is a proponent of Bitcoin and other cryptocurrencies and has an allocation of 25% of her net worth in bitcoin as of 2024.
