= Amova Asset Management =

Japanese multinational investment company

Amova Asset Management Co., Ltd.
- Type: Subsidiary
- Founded: 1959; 67 years ago
- Headquarters: Tokyo, Japan
- Area served: Worldwide
- Key people: Stefanie Drews (President and CEO); Kuniyuki Shudo (Executive Chair)
- Services: Investment management; Asset management; Mutual funds; Exchange-traded funds; Index funds
- AUM: ▲US$260 billion (2025)
- Parent: Sumitomo Mitsui Trust Holdings

Amova Asset Management (Japanese: ja:アモーヴァ•アセットマネジメント) is a Japanese multinational investment company. It is one of the largest asset managers globally with about $260 billion under management as of June 2025. Currently Japan's third largest manager, Amova aims to grow its funds under management to $415 billion by 2032. Amova Asset Management was called Nikko Asset Management (Japanese: 日興アセットマネジメント) until September 2025.

The company was formed by the merger of Nikko Securities Investment Trust and Management and Nikko International Capital Management in 1999. It has been a subsidiary of Sumitomo Mitsui Trust Holdings since 2009 and has been managed as a direct subsidiary since 2019.

== History ==
Amova Asset Management traces its roots to the Nikko Securities Investment Trust and Management Co., Ltd. founded in December 1959 opening its office in Tokyo. The company launched its first fund, the Nikko Bond Fund, in 1961. In 1981, Nikko International Capital Management Co., Ltd. was founded, also opening an office in Tokyo. In 1984, Nikko Securities Investment Trust and Management Co. opened an overseas office in New York City while Nikko International Capital Management Co. opened an office in London. Nikko Securities Investment Trust and Management Co. would also open an office in London in 1987 while Nikko International Capital Management Co. opened an office in Singapore the following year and Nikko Securities Investment Trust and Management Co. would open a Singapore office in 1990.

In 1999, the companies merged to form Nikko Asset Management.

In 2007, Citigroup acquired 61% of Nikko Asset Management for $7.7 billion to take majority control in what was the largest foreign buyout ever of a Japanese company. Citigroup attempted to buy out the remaining shares of Nikko later that year at a cost of $4.6 billion to take full control of the company. Two years later, Citigroup sold its stake to Sumitomo Trust and Banking Co, a subsidiary of Sumitomo Mitsui Trust Holdings, in a $1.2 billion deal as it retreated from Japan.

In June 2013, Nikko announced that Shibata Takumi would become chairman starting July 2013 succeeding Charles Beazley. He took over as president and CEO of the company in January 2014. At the time, Nikko was viewed as preparing to issue an IPO. During his leadership, Nikko focused on courting international investment with multi-asset products, which Shibata believed were attractive to global investors seeking diversified strategies. In 2017, Nikko launched a global robotics fund which raised roughly $6 billion USD and was the first of its kind from a Japanese asset manager. The company also acquired a 15% stake in Cathie Wood's firm ARK Invest. Shibata stepped down as president and CEO after six years with the company in March 2019.

In 2019, Sumitomo Mitsui Trust Holdings announced that it would make Nikko Asset Management a directly owned subsidiary through a dividend in kind transaction. It was previously held through the Sumitomo Trust and Banking Co which acquired Nikko from Citigroup in 2009.

In February 2022, it was announced that Nishida Yutaka would become chairman of Nikko Asset Management while Stephanie Drews would be promoted to president. Her appointment made Nikko one of only 12.1% of global asset managers headed by a woman.

In September 2025, Nikko Asset Management rebranded as Amova Asset Management.
