= Lulu Chow Wang =

American businesswoman and philanthropist

- Born: 1944 (age 80–81)
- Education: Wellesley College (BA), Columbia Business School (MBA)
- Title: CEO of Tupelo Capital Management
- Spouse: Anthony Wang

Lulu Chow Wang (or Lulu C. Wang) is an investment manager and philanthropist. She has been recognized as being part of a new wave of Asian-American philanthropy. She was featured in the Women in Business episode of a PBS documentary series Makers: Women Who Make America. She is a trustee emerita at The Rockefeller University, The Metropolitan Museum of Art, and Wellesley College, and director emerita of New York Public Radio.

== Early life ==
In 1948, Wang came to the United States with her family at the age of 4. Her father was a Chinese Nationalist leader, so they could not return to China after the Chinese Communist Revolution in 1949.

== Education ==
In 1966, Wang graduated with a B.A in English at Wellesley College.

== Career ==
Wang is the founder and CEO of Tupelo Capital Management since 1997.

Wang was elected to the Board of Trustees of The Metropolitan Museum of Art at the October 9, 2001, meeting of the Board.

== Philanthropy ==
In 2000, Wang and her husband, Anthony, gave the largest gift ever given at that time to a women's college with a gift of $25 million to Wellesley College. This funded the design and construction of Wellesley's campus center, also known as "Lulu."
