= Jon Zens =

American writer and theologian

Jon Zens is an American author, speaker, scholar and theologian on Christian topics. Zens is best known for pioneering New Covenant Theology. Zens is also an expert on the Anabaptist history and theology.

== Early life and education ==
Zens holds a B.A. in Biblical studies from Covenant College, a M.Div. from Westminster Theological Seminary, Philadelphia, and a D.Min. from the California Graduate School of Theology.

== Career ==
In 1975, Zens moved to Nashville to work with Norbert Ward on the publication Baptist Reformation Review. Because of declining health, Norbert asked Zens to be the editor in 1978. In 1982, the name of the quarterly was changed to Searching Together. The quarterly magazine features articles by Zens and many other writers on topics of divergent evangelicalism.

Zens and his wife Dotty have ministered to women who have been trafficked into the sex trade, aiding women who have been the victims of sexual abuse and involved in prostitution. Zens served for a time as a local pastor, but left the position. becoming an author and a traveling speaker, ministering in church conferences and speaking at conferences about the rescue of women from the sex industry and prostitution.

== Bibliography ==
- What's With Paul & Women: Unlocking the Cultural Background to 1 Timothy 2
- The Pastor Has No Clothes: Moving from Clergy-Centered Church to Christ-Centered Ekklesia
- No Will of My Own: How Patriarchy Smothers Female Dignity & Personhood
- A Church Building Every 1/2 Mile: What Makes American Christianity Tick?
- Christ Minimized? A Response to Rob Bell's Love Wins
- 58-0: How Christ Leads Through the One Anothers
