= Mary S. Caswell =

American educator and writer (1847–1924)

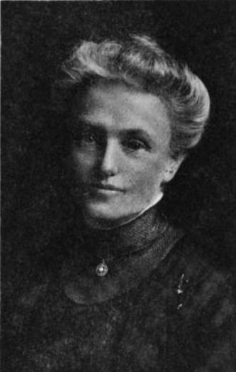
- Mary S. Caswell, from a 1913 publication
- Born: Mary S. Deering; 1847; Paris, Maine, U.S.
- Died: February 11, 1924 (aged 76–77); California, U.S.
- Resting place: Hollywood Forever Cemetery
- Occupation(s): Educator, writer
- Years active: 1880s–1920s
- Known for: Founder of the Marlborough School in Los Angeles
- Notable work: Loring, Short & Harmon's Illustrated Guide Book for Portland and Vicinity (1873); An Average Boy's Vacation (1876)
- Spouse: George A. Caswell (m. 1878; died 1880)
- Children: Georgia Caswell Overton
- Parent(s): Mark Deering; Alice Bailey Deering

Mary S. Deering Caswell (1847 – February 11, 1924) was an American educator and writer, founder of the Marlborough School in Los Angeles.

== Early life ==
Mary S. Deering was born in Paris, Maine in 1847 (some sources give 1850), the daughter of Mark Deering and Alice Bailey Deering. She had two sisters, Georgianna and Sarah. She was quite young when her parents died, and she was educated at various schools, including the Freehold Young Ladies Seminary in New Jersey. Her Deering cousins in Maine founded the Deering Harvester Company, which was a precursor of International Harvester.

== Career ==
Caswell founded a girls' school in Portland, Maine in 1883, and sold it in 1888, to move to southern California, for her daughter's health and her own prospects. She founded and ran the Marlborough School in Los Angeles, a private school for girls. "There are absolutely no rules at Marlborough," noted a 1902 report, "but at the beginning of each year the principal makes known to the twenty-five girls in the family their privileges and their obligations; explains to them certain laws of cause and effect," and "shows them that she will do all in her power to help them."

While still in Maine, Caswell published several books, including Loring, Short & Harmon's illustrated guide book for Portland and vicinity (1873), An Average Boy's Vacation (1876), Phil, Rob, and Louis, or Haps and Mishaps of Three Average Boys (1878), and Letters to Hetty Heedless and Others (1880). She co-wrote The Marlborough Course in Art History (1919) with Anna McConnell Beckley.

In Los Angeles, Caswell was vocal in her "vehement" opposition to women's suffrage, saying the vote would "rob women of privileges they currently enjoyed and impose responsibilities they did not want." She also lectured on art history to community groups.

== Personal life ==
Mary Deering married George A. Caswell in 1878; he died in 1880. Caswell died in California in 1924, in her seventies. Her grave is in the Hollywood Forever Cemetery. Her daughter, Georgia Caswell Overton, was headmistress of the Marlborough from 1948 to 1962. The Marlborough School still exists, and is the oldest independent girls' school in Southern California.
