= Ark Invest =

American asset management firm

ARK Investment Management LLC
- Type: Privately held company
- Industry: Asset management
- Founded: 2014; 12 years ago
- Founder: Cathie Wood
- Headquarters: Global: St. Petersburg, Florida; UK/EU: London
- Key people: Cathie Wood, CEO
- Products: Exchange-traded funds ARK Venture Fund
- AUM: ▲$30 billion
- Owner: Cathie Wood (50%); Nikko Asset Management (15%)
- Number of employees: 65
- Website: ark-invest.com ark-funds.com ark-ventures.com europe.ark-funds.com

ARK Investment Management LLC (commonly referred to as "ARK" or "ARK Invest") is an American investment management firm based in St. Petersburg, Florida, that manages several actively managed exchange-traded funds (ETFs), and the ARK Venture Fund, a closed-end interval fund that invests in both public and private companies. It was founded by Cathie Wood in 2014. ARK funds were four of the top five best performing ETFs of 2025. As of 2025, it manages US$30 billion.

== History ==
In 2014, after Cathie Wood's idea for actively managed exchange-traded funds based on disruptive innovation was deemed too risky by AllianceBernstein, where she was chief investment officer of global thematic strategies, she left and founded Ark Invest. The company is named after the Ark of the Covenant. Wood, a devout Christian, was reading the One-Year Bible at the time of founding. It is also a backronym for Active Research Knowledge.

In October 2014, the company launched its first four active funds: the Innovation ETF, the Genomic Revolution ETF, the Next Generation Internet ETF and the Autonomous Technology & Robotics ETF. These were followed by the Fintech Innovation ETF in 2019 and the Space Exploration & Innovation ETF in 2021.

In 2017, Nikko Asset Management acquired a 15% stake in ARK following the success of a Global Fintech Equity Fund it partnered with ARK to launch in 2016. As part of the deal, Nikko has exclusive rights to offer ARK products and investment strategies in Japan and the broader Asia-Pacific region.

The company also maintains two index funds: the 3D Printing ETF, launched in 2016, and the Israel Innovative Technology ETF, launched in 2017. It formerly maintained the Transparency ETF, launched in 2021. In July 2022, ARK announced that it would shutter the Transparency ETF (CTRU), effective July 31, 2022, after it was notified that Transparency Global would stop calculating the Transparency Index.

In November 2020, Resolute Investment Managers announced it would exercise its option to acquire a majority stake in the company. However, in December 2020, Cathie Wood repurchased the option, maintaining control of the company, while continuing to use Resolute's distribution services, obtaining financing from Eldridge Industries. Resolute Investment remains a minority shareholder.

In December 2020, the Innovation ETF became the largest actively managed ETF, with $17 billion in assets under management and a 170% return in 2020. On January 11, 2021, the company became one of the top 10 issuers of exchange-traded funds.

In June 2021, the firm filed to create a bitcoin ETF under the ticker ARKB, pending approval of the SEC, which had yet to approve any ETF based on the asset. They re-filed to launch the spot bitcoin ETF in the US on April 25, 2023; it was approved on January 10, 2024, and began trading the following day.

In October 2021, the firm moved its office from New York City to St. Petersburg, Florida.

On September 19, 2023, ARK Invest announced expansion into Europe, acquiring Rize ETF Limited ("Rize ETF"), Europe's first specialist thematic ETF issuer. The Rize ETF brand was phased out and transitioned to "ARK Invest Europe". ARK Invest Europe offers three ARK-branded active UCITS ETFs and seven Rize-branded index ETFs.

Ark Investment sold $47.9 million worth of Coinbase shares - 137,075 shares between June 30 and July 2, 2025 - after the stock surged 37% in the past month. Despite the sale, Coinbase remains the second-largest holding in Ark’s flagship Innovation ETF, accounting for 8.4% of the portfolio. Ark’s funds have rebounded in 2025, with ARKK up 23.4% year-to-date, far outpacing the S&P 500’s 6.8% gain.

== Investment strategy ==
ARK Invest focuses on investing in disruptive technology. These technologies include artificial intelligence, DNA sequencing, CRISPR gene editing, robotics, electric vehicles, energy storage, fintech, 3D printing and blockchain technology. It has also invested in cryptocurrencies. The company invests in stocks it projects to double in value over a five-year period.

On November 22, 2022, Cathie Wood stated her $1 million bitcoin price target by 2030 during an interview on Bloomberg TV. On that date, November 22, 2022, Bitcoin closed at $16,174; so, Bitcoin's price must increase 61 fold over the next 8 years to reach the $1M price target.

From 2014 to 2021, the ARK Innovation ETF averaged an annual 39% return on investment, over three times the return of the S&P 500 during that time. Street.com published on December 9, 2022: "Ark innovation ETF has dropped 63% so far in 2022 and is down 78% from its February 2021 peak. Wood has defended her strategy by noting that she has a five year investment horizon."

As its funds cannot hold cash, the firm also invests in numerous Big Tech stocks it refers to as "cash-like innovation stocks".

ARK publishes current analyses, transactions and portfolios, and also opens its research reviews to the public. In addition to financial analysts, ARK employs scientists and computer scientists, believing they can better assess the impact of disruptive technologies. Most of the company's analysts are millennials without prior Wall Street experience.

== Risks ==
Critics such as James Grant and Jason Zweig warn that investors chasing outsized returns by investing in ARK ETFs may be disappointed, as "hot" funds and thematic ETFs generally cannot sustain their performance.

The flagship ARK Innovation ETF has received accolades for its performance in 2017, 2020, 2023 and 2025, but was considered by Morningstar to be the third highest "wealth destroyer" investment fund from 2014–2023. In January 2026, Morningstar ranked ARKK as the fifth best performing ETF of 2025, with ARK funds taking four of the top five spots.

In 2021, Morningstar noted concerns over ARK's sizable ownership in several of its smaller holdings.

== Funds ==
ARK Invest managed or manages the following exchange-traded funds:

Fund name	Ticker	Type	Created
Innovation ETF	NYSE Arca: ARKK	Active	2014
Next Generation Internet ETF	NYSE Arca: ARKW	Active	2014
Genomic Revolution ETF	CBOE: ARKG	Active	2014
Autonomous Technology & Robotics ETF	CBOE: ARKQ	Active	2014
Fintech Innovation ETF	NYSE Arca: ARKF	Active	2019
Space Exploration & Innovation ETF	CBOE: ARKX	Active	2021
The 3D Printing ETF	CBOE: PRNT	Index-based	2016
Israel Innovative Technology ETF	CBOE: IZRL	Index-based	2017
Transparency ETF	CBOE: CTRU	Index-based	2021 (closed 2022)
Bitcoin ETF	CBOE: ARKB	Index-based	2024

In September 2022 ARK launched the ARK Venture Fund, a venture capital investment fund which is separate from their exchange-traded funds.
