= Shibata Takumi (fund manager) =

Japanese fund manager

- 柴田拓美
- Born: 1953; Yokohama, Japan
- Education: Keio University; Harvard Business School
- Occupations: Financial executive Founding partner at Fiducia VC

Shibata Takumi (Japanese: 柴田拓美) is a Japanese fund manager who is one of Japan's most high-profile financial executives. He is currently founding partner at Fiducia, a venture capital fund based in Tokyo.

Previously, he was president and CEO of Nikko Asset Management for six years and had a 37-year career at Nomura Holdings including as chief operating officer (COO) from 2008 until 2012.

== Education ==
Shibata graduated with a bachelor's degree in economics from Keio University in 1976 where he was debating champion of Japan's English-speaking Society. He earned an MBA from Harvard Business School in 1983.

== Career ==
Shibata joined Nomura Securities in 1976. In 2005, he was appointed president of Nomura Asset Management, and became vice president of the holding company in 2008. He was a key player in the company's internationalization strategy. During the 2008 financial crisis, Shibata was the driving force behind the acquisition of Lehman Brothers' European and Asian operations and led their integration as the company's vice president. The deal transformed Nomura into a global player and strengthened its hold on the Japanese market; however, it resulted in steep losses in some divisions. The deal led to Nomura's entrance to the Indian market. He announced his resignation from Nomura as COO in 2012. At the time, there was an investigation into alleged insider trading at the company involving leaks of confidential information to clients ahead of IPOs. After transitioning out of the COO role in August 2012, he continued to advise the company before fully retiring in March 2013 after 37 years with the company. During his time at the company, he spent 17 years outside of Japan including 12 years in London along with stings in Hong Kong and Boston.

In June 2013, Nikko Asset Management, then Japan's third largest fund manager, announced that Shibata would become its chairman starting the following month. He took over as president and CEO of the company in January 2014. In the role, he focused on courting international investment with multi-asset products, which he said are attractive to global investors seeking diversified strategies. Following the 2016 Brexit referendum, he expressed confidence that London would remain a global financial center. In 2017, Shibata recommended high-growth sectors while stock picking and touted Nikko's global robotics fund which raised roughly $6 billion USD and was the first of its kind in Japan. He stepped down as president and CEO after six years with the company in March 2019.

Shibata went on to found Fiducia in June 2020. The company announced its first fund, the Fiducia GrowthTech Fund, in February 2022 with a focus on deep tech and healthcare solutions. The fund launched with initial capital of ¥3.3 billion JPY but expected to raise ¥10 billion JPY within its first year of operations.

== Personal life and philanthropy ==
Shibata was born in Yokohama in Japan's Kanagawa Prefecture in 1953.

He sits on the board of Japan for UNHCR, the Tokyo Nikikai Opera Foundation, and JESC Music and Cultural Foundation.
