= Nikken Sekkei =

Japanese architecture firm

Nikken Sekkei Ltd.

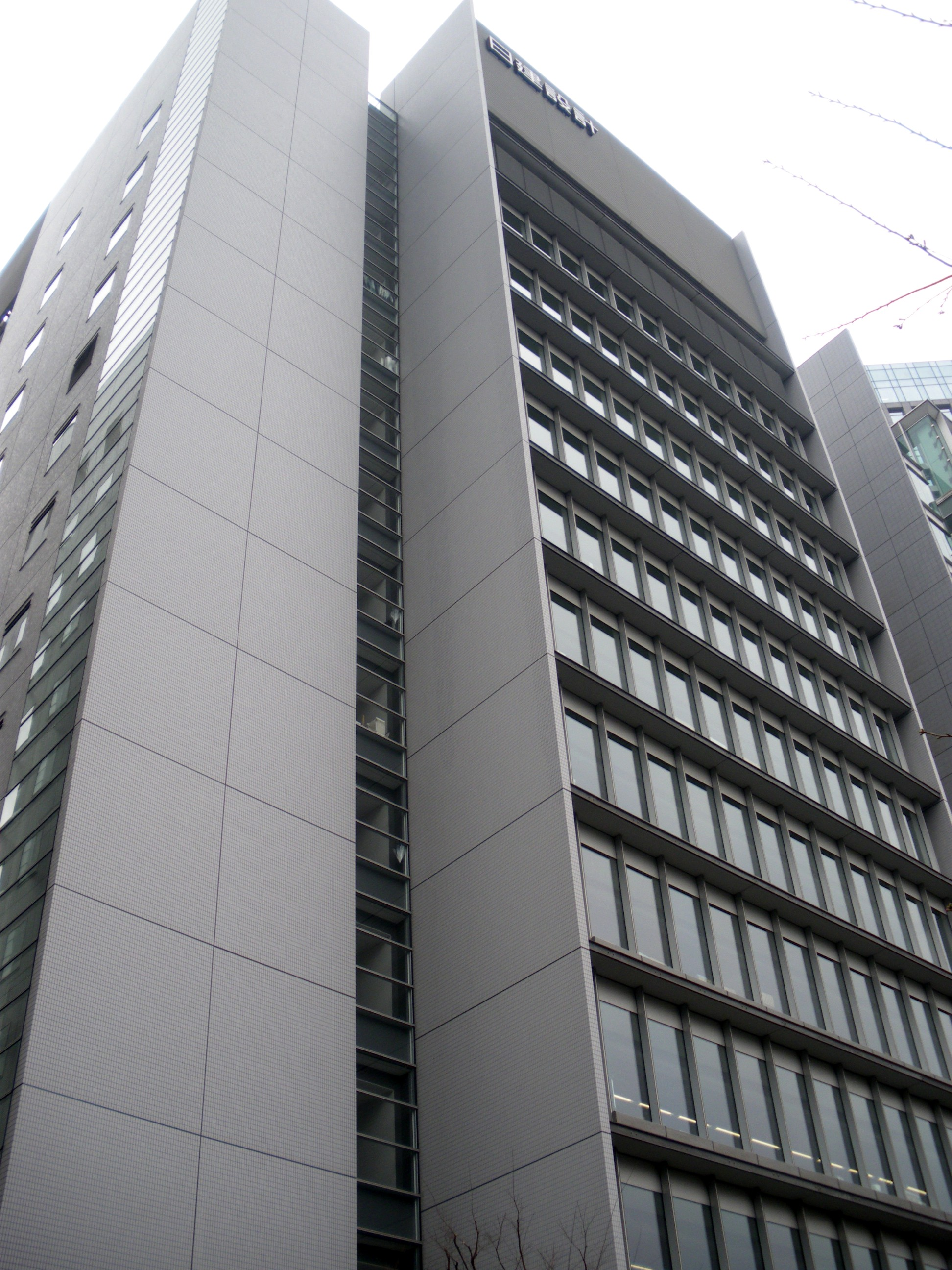
- Nikken Sekkei's headquarters in Iidabashi, Chiyoda-ku, Tokyo
- Native name: 株式会社日建設計
- Type: Private
- Industry: Architecture; Engineering; Planning/Urbanism
- Founded: 1900; 126 years ago
- Headquarters: Iidabashi, Chiyoda-ku, Tokyo, Japan
- Area served: Worldwide
- Key people: Tadao Kamei (president and CEO)
- Services: Architectural design; Interior design; Urban design and planning; Landscape design; Structural engineering; MEP engineering; Civil engineering; Computation design & BIM; Sustainability; Resilience; Consulting
- Number of employees: 2,685 (as of April 1, 2019)
- Website: www.nikken.co.jp/en

Nikken Sekkei Ltd. (日建設計) is an architectural, planning and engineering firm from Japan, with headquarters in Chiyoda, Tokyo. As of 2019, Nikken Sekkei ranks as the second largest architectural practice in the world.

== Staff and offices ==
As of 2019, the group employs 2,685 workers and has completed more than 25,000 projects in more than 50 countries. Nikken Sekkei's International offices are in Tokyo, Shanghai, Beijing, Dalian, Seoul, Hanoi, Ho Chi Minh City, Singapore, Dubai, Riyadh, Moscow, Barcelona; Bangkok; while the Japanese branches are located in: Osaka, Nagoya, Fukuoka, and Sendai. The newest office opened in 2023 in Dubai, UAE.

== History ==
Nikken Sekkei dates its origins back to 1900, as an offspring of Sumitomo Corporation. Under the name of Sumitomo Temporary Architecture Department, it was founded in response to Sumitomo's need to establish a headquarters. The company established its independence from the Sumitomo Corporation in the 1950s under the name Nikken Sekkei Komu Co. Ltd. As a private practice since 1970, Nikken Sekkei has maintained its In-house Shareholder Corporate System and is partly owned by its employees.

Nikken Sekkei together with Nikken Sekkei Research Institute (NSRI), Hokkaido Nikken Sekkei, Nikken Sekkei Civil Engineering (NSC), Nikken Housing System Ltd (NHS), Nikken Space Design (NSD), Nikken Sekkei Construction Management (NCM) forms the Nikken Group.

In 2018, Nikken Sekkei was shortlisted for the European Cultural Centre Architecture Award.

== President and CEO ==
Tadao Kamei has been CEO and President of Nikken Sekkei since 2015.

== Selected projects ==
- Osaka Library, 1904
- Sumitomo Mitsui Banking Corporation Osaka Head Office, 1930
- Tokyo Tower, 1958
- San'ai Dream Center, Tokyo, 1963
- Shinjuku NS Building, Tokyo, 1982
- Tokyo Dome, 1988
- Trade Tower, Seoul, South Korea, 1988
- Cairo Opera House, 1988
- Pacifico Yokohama, 1991
- Islamic development Bank Headquarters, Jeddah, 1993
- Dubai Chamber of Commerce building, 1995
- Queen's Square Yokohama, 1997
- Saitama Super Arena, 2000
- Bank of China Tower, 2000
- Kyoto State Guest House, 2005
- Tokyo Midtown, 2007
- Hoki Museum, 2010
- The Ritz-Carlton Kyoto, 2013
- Guangzhou Library, 2013
- Ruentex Nangang Station Complex, 2014
- YKK 80 Building, 2015
- Tokyo Plaza Ginza, 2016
- Ariake Gymnastics Centre, 2019
- One Za'abeel, 2024
- H&S Residence, 2025
- Trump International Hotel and Tower, 2031

Among other notable projects, Nikken Sekkei was the primary architectural firm for the Tokyo Skytree, currently (2019) the tallest self-supporting broadcasting tower in the world, and second tallest man made structure of any kind.

In 2016 it has been selected by FC Barcelona for the redesign of the largest stadium in Europe. and in 2018, Sumitomo Forestry, in collaboration with Nikken Sekkei, announced the study of W350 Project, the future tallest timber tower (350 meters) and Japan tallest building.

== Group companies ==
- Nikken Sekkei Research Institute (NSRI): Focused on the environment, energy and city management fields. It conducts researches, making policy recommendations and surveys, project and planning support services.
- Hokkaido Nikken Sekkei: Specialized in architectural design and programming; urban, regional, and environmental planning, and related investigation and consulting for extreme-cold weather condition regions.
- Nikken Sekkei Civil Engineering (NSC): Specialized in urban development, urban infrastructure, manufacturing facilities, geotechnical and marine environment investigation, planning, design management and consulting services.
- Nikken Housing System Ltd (NHS): Specialized multiple dwelling complex planning, design and administration together with the related surveying, research, and product development.
- Nikken Space Design (NSD): Specialized in space design and administration services, focusing on architectural interiors, furniture and component design.
- Nikken Sekkei Construction Management (NCM): Specialized in construction management incorporating advances technology services throughout every stage of a construction project.
