= Royal F. Oakes =

American lawyer

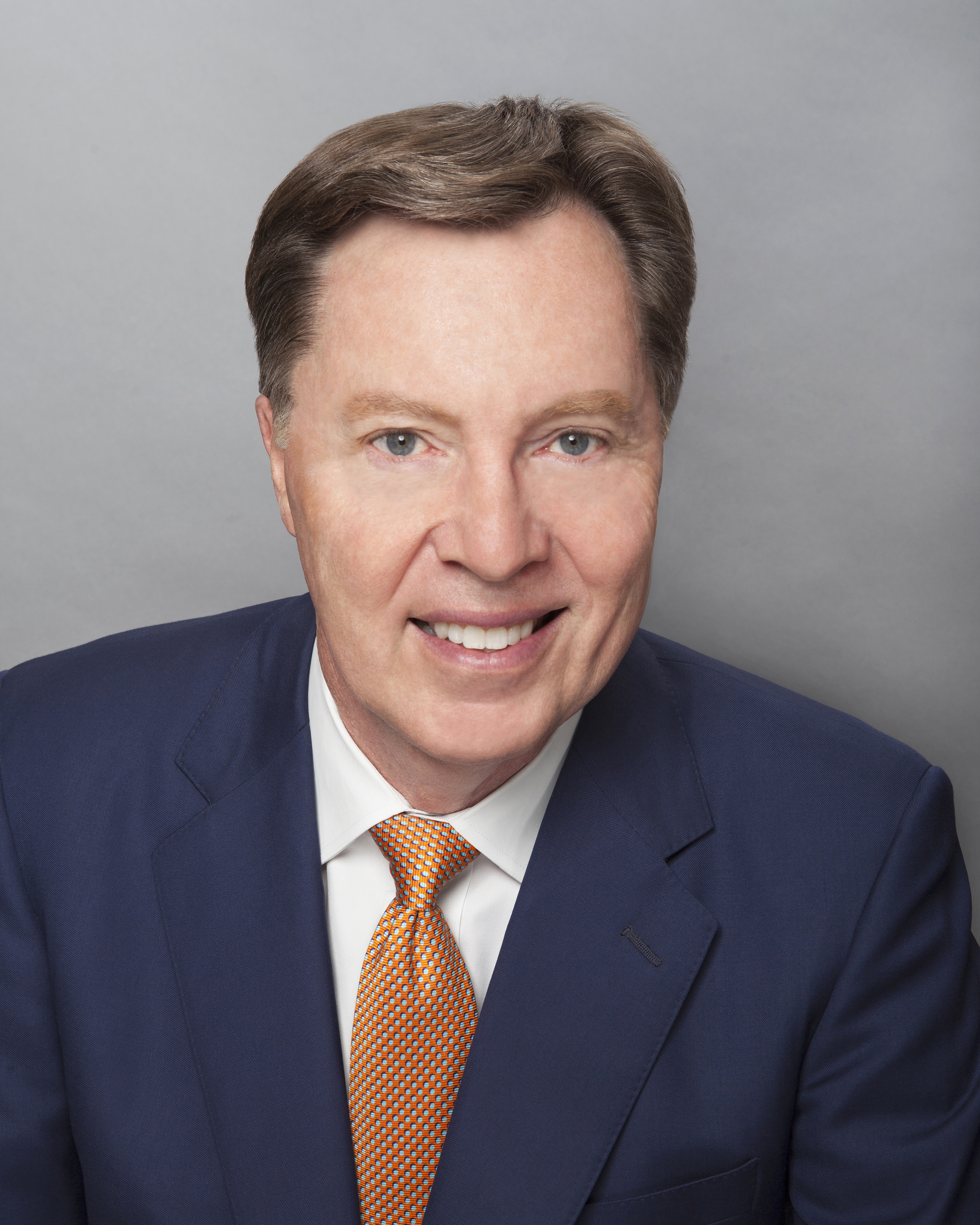
Royal Oakes

Royal Forest Oakes, a Los Angeles–based partner at Hinshaw & Culbertson LLP, is a legal analyst and news contributor.

== Career ==
Oakes is a graduate of UCLA and UCLA Law School. His business litigation practice involves representation of defendants in class action and "unfair business practices" litigation, and high-profile life, health and disability claim litigation, and defense of companies in employment law disputes. He has been lead counsel in victorious cases in the California Supreme Court and the Ninth Circuit Court of Appeals, and regularly tries jury and bench cases in the United States District Court for the Central District of California, and the Los Angeles Superior Court. He also maintains a substantial caseload of litigation matters in northern California. Oakes serves as a Commissioner on the Los Angeles County Commission on Economy and Efficiency, and has served as chair of the Commission's Task Force on Organization and Accountability.

== In the news ==
=== Broadcast media ===
Royal Oakes has appeared nationally on the syndicated programs Inside Edition, Extra and Access Hollywood. In Los Angeles, he has been the Legal Analyst for NBC4 News, KABC Radio and KFWB All-News Radio. His one-minute spot, "It's The Law," aired nationally on Westwood One's "Metro Networks." He contributes to network radio news broadcasts, and network television broadcasts such as ABC's Good Morning America, 20/20, and NBC's Today Show. He has hosted an ABC News Now program on the law, "Guilt or Innocence." In the San Francisco Bay Area, he is KGO Radio's Legal Analyst.

In 2017, Royal was honored by Los Angeles City Hall for his 30 years as a media analyst and commentator. L.A. City Councilman Curren Price said, "[Royal] is dedicated to giving back to the community and has provided hours of thoughtful and provoking legal commentary on his home station KABC."

=== Print ===
Oakes has been a regular contributor to the Los Angeles Daily Journal's "Business Litigation" column, and has written on law, tort reform and politics. He has published features in the Los Angeles Times, Chicago Tribune, Dallas Morning News, San Francisco Chronicle, USA Today.

=== Testimony on cameras in court ===
The San Francisco Chronicle reported on 10 January 1996 that Oakes testified before a task force on cameras in the courtroom, appointed by then-California Supreme Court Chief Justice Malcolm M. Lucas:

"The public has a right to see its court system at work," said Royal Oakes, a lawyer for the Radio and Television News Association of Southern California. "Are we going to let this case [Simpson] dictate our public policy? We are never again going to see anything like this case."
