= List of Japanese people by net worth =

This list shows the richest Japanese citizens by net worth, based on the list published by Forbes annually.

== 2022 ==
Based on Forbes The World's Billionaires 2022

#	Name	Age	Net Worth	Source of Wealth	Notes
1	Tadashi Yanai	73	US$26.1 billion	Fast Retailing	
2	Takemitsu Takizaki	76	US$23.9 billion	Keyence	
3	Masayoshi Son	64	US$21.3 billion	Softbank	
4	Takahisa Takahara	60	US$6.4 billion	Unicharm	
5	Shigenobu Nagamori	77	US$5.4 billion	Nidec	
6	Hiroshi Mikitani	60	US$5.1 billion	Rakuten	
7	Masatoshi Ito	97	US$4.6 billion	Seven & I Holdings Co.	
8	Akio Nitori	71	US$4.0 billion	Nitori	
9	Akira Mori & family	78	US$3.7 billion	Mori Trust	
10	Masahiro Noda	83	US$3.5 billion	Obic	
11	Yasumitsu Shigeta	57	US$3.2 billion	Hikari Tsushin, Inc.	
12	Masahiro Miki	59	US$3.0 billion	ABC-Mart	
12	Masateru Uno	75	US$3.0 billion	Cosmos Pharmaceutical	
14	Takao Yasuda	72	US$2.7 billion	Don Quijote	
15	Yoichi & Keiko Erikawa	N/A	US$2.5 billion	Koei	
16	Katsumi Tada	76	US$2.4 billion	Daito Trust Construction	
17	Masaaki Arai	56	US$2.1 billion	Open House	
17	Eiichi Kuriwada	75	US$2.1 billion	Sagawa Express	
17	Yuji Otsuka	68	US$2.1 billion	Otsuka Corporation	
20	Yusaku Maezawa	46	US$1.9 billion	Zozotown	

== 2015 ==
Based on Forbes Japan's Richest 2015

#	Name	Age	Net Worth	Source of Wealth	Notes
1	Tadashi Yanai	66	US$21.1 billion	Fast Retailing	
2	Masayoshi Son	57	US$13.9 billion	Softbank	
3	Nobutada Saji & family	69	US$10.9 billion	Suntory	
4	Hiroshi Mikitani	50	US$10.5 billion	Rakuten	
5	Takemitsu Takizaki	69	US$8.8 billion	Keyence	
6	Keiichiro Takahara	84	US$5.4 billion	Unicharm	
7	Han Chang-Woo & family	84	US$4.9 billion	Maruhan	
8	Kunio Busujima & family	90	US$4.4 billion	Sankyo	
9	Masatoshi Ito	91	US$3.8 billion	Seven & I Holdings Co.	
10	Akira Mori & family	78	US$3.8 billion	Mori Trust	
11	Masahiro Miki	59	US$3.5 billion	ABC-Mart	
12	Shigenobu Nagamori	70	US$3.1 billion	Nidec	
13	Yoshiko Mori	74	US$2.8 billion	Mori Building Company	The late Minoru Mori's widow
14	Yasumitsu Shigeta	50	US$2.1 billion	Hikari Tsushin	
15	Kinoshita brothers		US$2.1 billion	Acom	Kyosuke, Shigeyoshi and Katsuhiro Kinoshita
16	Takao Yasuda	66	US$2 billion	Don Quijote	
17	Akio Nitori	71	US$1.9 billion	Nitori	
18	Naruatsu Baba	37	US$1.7 billion	Colopl	
19	Minoru & Yuji Otsuka		US$1.7 billion	Otsuka Corporation	
20	Kanazawa brothers		US$1.6 billion	Sanyo Bussan	Yokyu, Zenkyu and Shinkyu Kanazawa
21	Hiroko Takei & family		US$1.6 billion	Takefuji	The late Yasuo Takei's widow
22	Tada brothers		US$1.6 billion	Sundrug	Naoki and Takashi Tada
23	Yusaku Maezawa	39	US$1.5 billion	Zozotown	
24	Kenji Kasahara	39	US$1.07 billion	mixi	
25	Katsumi Tada	69	US$1.5 billion	Daito Trust Construction	
26	Hirokazu Sugiura & family	64	US$1.4 billion	Sugi Holdings	
27	Chizuko & Michio Matsui		US$1.3 billion	Matsui Securities	
28	Kazuo Okada & family	72	US$1.3 billion	Universal Entertainment Corporation	
29	Soichiro Fukutake	69	US$1.2 billion	Benesse	
30	Yoshikazu Tanaka	38	US$1.1 billion	GREE, Inc.	
47	Yoshiyuki Sankai	56	US$1.1 billion	Cyberdyne Inc.	
32	Kazuo Inamori & family	83	US$1.1 billion	Kyocera	
33	Nobutoshi Shimamura & family	89	US$1.1 billion	Shimamura	
34	Shoji Uehara	87	US$1 billion	Taisho Pharmaceutical	
35	Hiroshi Ishibashi	68	US$980 million	Bridgestone	
36	Yoji Sato & family	69	US$965 million	Dynam	
37	Masayuki Ishihara	66	US$950 million	Heiwa	
38	Hajime Satomi	73	US$925 million	Sega Sammy Holdings	
39	Muneaki Masuda	64	US$910 million	Culture Convenience Club	
40	Ryoichi Jinnai	88	US$900 million	Promise	
41	Masahiro Noda	76	US$870 million	Obic	
42	Yasuhiro Fukushima	67	US$850 million	Square Enix	
43	Susumu Fujita	42	US$780 million	Cyber Agent	
44	Kagemasa Kozuki	74	US$750 million	Konami	
45	Yoshitaka Fukuda	67	US$740 million	Aiful	
46	Yoshiko Shinohara	80	US$680 million	Tempstaff	
47	Masatoshi Kumagai	51	US$670 million	GMO Internet	
48	Satoshi Suzuki	61	US$650 million	Pola	
49	Tetsuro Funai	88	US$630 million	Funai	
50	Kentaro Ogawa & family	66	US$600 million	Zensho	

== 2013 ==
Based on Forbes Japan's Richest 2013

#	Name	Age	Net Worth	Source of Wealth	Notes
1	Masayoshi Son	55	US$22.3 billion	Softbank	
2	Tadashi Yanai & family	64	US$15.5 billion	Fast Retailing	
3	Nobutada Saji & family	67	US$10.7 billion	Suntory	
4	Hiroshi Mikitani	50	US$6.4 billion	Rakuten	
5	Kunio Busujima & family	88	US$5.2 billion	Sankyo	
6	Akira Mori & family	77	US$5 billion	Mori Trust	
7	Takemitsu Takizaki	68	US$4.7 billion	Keyence	
8	Han Chang-Woo & family	82	US$3.4 billion	Maruhan	
9	Keiichiro Takahara	82	US$3.3 billion	Unicharm	
10	Masatoshi Ito	89	US$2.8 billion	Seven & I Holdings Co.	
11	Shoji Uehara	84	US$2.5 billion	Taisho Pharmaceutical	
12	Masahiro Miki	57	US$2.4 billion	ABC-Mart	
13	Hiroshi Yamauchi	85	US$2.1 billion	Nintendo	
14	Hiroko Takei & family		US$2 billion	Takefuji	The late Yasuo Takei's widow
15	Yoshikazu Tanaka	36	US$1.9 billion	GREE, Inc.	
16	Yasumitsu Shigeta	48	US$1.65 billion	Hikari Tsushin	
17	Kanazawa brothers		US$1.6 billion	Sanyo Bussan	
18	Kinoshita brothers		US$1.56 billion	Acom	Kyosuke, Shigeyoshi and Katsuhiro Kinoshita
19	Katsumi Tada	68	US$1.52 billion	Daito Trust Construction	
20	Kazuo Okada & family	70	US$1.5 billion	Universal Entertainment Corporation	
21	Chizuko & Michio Matsui		US$1.4 billion	Matsui Securities	
22	Minoru & Yuji Otsuka		US$1.34 billion	Otsuka Corporation	
23	Shigenobu Nagamori	68	US$1.3 billion	Nidec	
24	Tada brothers		US$1.26 billion	Sundrug	Naoki and Takashi Tada
25	Soichiro Fukutake	67	US$1.25 billion	Benesse	
26	Kagemasa Kozuki	72	US$1.2 billion	Konami	
27	Hajime Satomi	71	US$1.17 billion	Sega Sammy Holdings	
28	Ryoichi Jinnai	86	US$1.1 billion	Promise	
29	Takao Yasuda	64	US$1.08 billion	Don Quijote	
30	Kanbee Kokubu & family	74	US$1.07 billion	Kokubu	
31	Nobutoshi Shimamura & family	87	US$1.1 billion	Shimamura	
32	Akio Nitori	69	US$1.2 billion	Nitori	
33	Yoshiko Mori	72	US$1 billion	Mori Building Company	The late Minoru Mori's widow
34	Kazuo Inamori & family	81	US$960 million	Kyocera	
35	Masayuki Ishihara & family	64	US$930 million	Heiwa	
36	Hirokazu Sugiura & family	62	US$910 million	Sugi Holdings	
37	Yoji Sato & family	67	US$890 million	Dynam	
38	Muneaki Masuda	62	US$850 million	Culture Convenience Club	
39	Hiroshi Ishibashi	66	US$820 million	Bridgestone	
40	Nobuyoshi Fujisawa	43	US$820 million	J Trust	
41	Tetsuro Funai	86	US$750 million	Funai	
42	Yusaku Maezawa	37	US$740 million	Zozotown	
43	Kentaro Ogawa & family	65	US$730 million	Zensho	
44	Yoshitaka Fukuda	65	US$630 million	Aiful	
45	Yasuhiro Fukushima	65	US$570 million	Square Enix	
46	Masahiro Noda	74	US550$ million	Obic	
47	Tomoko Namba	51	US550$ million	DeNA	
48	Eitaro Itoyama	71	US$500 million	Shin Nihon Kanko	
49	Hiroyuki Inoue		US$450 million	Yamato Kogyo	
50	Shoichiro Toyoda	88	US$400 million	Toyota Motor Corporation	

== 2012 ==
Based on Forbes Japan's Richest 2012

#	Name	Age	Net Worth	Source of Wealth	Notes
1	Tadashi Yanai & family	63	US$10.6 billion	Fast Retailing	
2	Nobutada Saji & family	66	US$7.9 billion	Suntory	
3	Masayoshi Son	54	US$6.9 billion	Softbank	
4	Hiroshi Mikitani	47	US$6.3 billion	Rakuten	
5	Kunio Busujima & family	86	US$5.7 billion	Sankyo	
6	Takemitsu Takizaki	66	US$4 billion	Keyence	
7	Yoshikazu Tanaka	35	US$3.5 billion	GREE, Inc.	
8	Akira Mori & family	75	US$3.2 billion	Mori Trust	
9	Keiichiro Takahara	81	US$2.9 billion	Unicharm	
10	Han Chang-Woo & family	81	US$2.8 billion	Maruhan	
11	Hiroshi Yamauchi	84	US$2.7 billion	Nintendo	
12	Masatoshi Ito	87	US$2.6 billion	Seven & I Holdings Co.	
13	Eitaro Itoyama	69	US$2.5 billion	Shin Nihon Kanko	
14	Masahiro Miki	56	US$2.4 billion	ABC-Mart	
15	Hiroko Takei & family	70	US$2 billion	Takefuji	The late Yasuo Takei's widow
16	Katsumi Tada	66	US$1.9 billion	Daito Trust Construction	
17	Shigenobu Nagamori	67	US$1.8 billion	Nidec	
18	Kazuo Okada & family	69	US$1.6 billion	Universal Entertainment Corporation	
19	Soichiro Fukutake	66	US$1.5 billion	Benesse	
20	Kanazawa brothers		US$1.4 billion	Sanyo Bussan	
21	Kinoshita brothers		US$1.3 billion	Acom	Kyosuke, Shigeyoshi and Katsuhiro Kinoshita
22	Ryoichi Jinnai	85	US$1.25 billion	Promise	
23	Akio Nitori	68	US$1.2 billion	Nitori	
24	Kanbei Kokubu & family	72	US$1.18 billion	Kokubu	
25	Hajime Satomi	70	US$1.15 billion	Sega Sammy Holdings	
26	Nobutoshi Shimamura & family	86	US$1.1 billion	Shimamura	
27	Minoru & Yuji Otsuka	89/59	US$1.05 billion	Otsuka Corporation	
28	Tetsuro Funai	85	US$1 billion	Funai	
29	Yasumitsu Shigeta	47	US$990 million	Hikari Tsushin	
30	Yusaku Maezawa	36	US$950 million	Zozotown	
31	Kazuo Inamori & family	80	US$940 million	Kyocera	
32	Takao Yasuda	62	US$930 million	Don Quijote	
33	Chizuko & Michio Matsui	57/58	US$910 million	Matsui Securities	
34	Tada brothers		US$900 million	Sundrug	Naoki and Takashi Tada
35	Muneaki Masuda	61	US$850 million	Culture Convenience Club	
36	Shoji Uehara	84	US$800 million	Taisho Pharmaceutical	
37	Hirokazu Sugiura & family	60	US$740 million	Sugi Holdings	
38	Hiroshi Ishibashi	63	US$670 million	Bridgestone	
39	Yasuhiro Fukushima	64	US$660 million	Square Enix	
40	Kentaro Ogawa	64	US$650 million	Zensho	

== 2010 ==
Based on Forbes Japan's Richest 2010

#	Name	Age	Net Worth	Source of Wealth	Notes
1	Tadashi Yanai	60	US$9.2 billion	Fast Retailing	
2	Nobutada Saji	64	US$8.6 billion	Suntory	
3	Akira Mori	73	US$6.1 billion	Mori Trust	
4	Masayoshi Son	52	US$5.6 billion	Softbank	
5	Kunio Busujima	84	US$5.3 billion	Sankyo	
6	Hiroshi Mikitani	44	US$4.7 billion	Rakuten	
7	Hiroshi Yamauchi	82	US$3.8 billion	Nintendo	
8	Eitaro Itoyama	67	US$3.4 billion	Shin Nihon Kanko	
9	Takemitsu Takizaki	64	US$2.9 billion	Keyence	
10	Hiroko Takei	68	US$2.5 billion	Takefuji	The late Yasuo Takei's family
11	Masahiro Miki	54	US$2.1 billion	ABC-Mart	
12	Keiichiro Takahara	78	US$1.95 billion	Unicharm	
13	Shigenobu Nagamori	65	US$1.9 billion	Nidec	
14	Masatoshi Ito	85	US$1.85 billion	Ito-Yokado	
15	Yokyu Kanzawa		US$1.8 billion	Sanyo Bussan	
16	Katsumi Tada	64	US$1.75 billion	Daito Trust Construction	
17	Han Chang-Woo	78	US$1.7 billion	Maruhan	
18	Yoshikazu Tanaka	32	US$1.6 billion	GREE, Inc.	
19	Soichiro Fukutake	64	US$1.4 billion	Benesse	
20	Minoru Mori	75	US$1.35 billion	Mori Building Company	
21	Tetsuro Funai	83	US$1.3 billion	Funai Electric	
22	Ryoichi Jinnai	83	US$1.25 billion	Promise	
23	Kanbei Kokubu	70	US$1.2 billion	Kokubu	
24	Nobutoshi Shimamura	83	US$1.1 billion	Shimamura	
25	Kinoshita brothers		US$1.05 billion	Acom	Kyosuke, Shigeyoshi and Katsuhiro Kinoshita
26	Kazuo Okada	67	US$1 billion	Universal Entertainment Corporation	
27	Chizuko & Michio Matsui	55/56	US$960 million	Matsui Securities	
28	Kazuo Inamori	78	US$920 million	Kyocera	
29	Junichiro Takada	73	US$900 million	Takata Corporation	
30	Akio Nitori	66	US$890 million	Nitori	
31	Muneaki Masuda	59	US$800 million	Culture Convenience Club	
32	Hajime Satomi	68	US$780 million	Sega Sammy Holdings	
33	Kenji Kasahara	34	US$720 million	mixi	
34	Yasuhiro Fukushima	62	US$710 million	Square Enix	
35	Tada brothers		US$700 million	Sundrug	Naoki and Takashi Tada
36	Minoru & Yuji Otsuka	87/56	US$690 million	Otsuka Corporation	
37	Takao Yasuda	60	US$690 million	Don Quijote	
38	Yasumitsu Shigeta	44	US$660 million	Hikari Tsushin	
39	Shoji Uehara	82	US$640 million	Taisho Pharmaceutical	
40	Shoichiro Toyoda	84	US$620 million	Toyota Motor Corporation	

== 2007 ==
Based on Forbes Japan's Richest 2007

#	Name	Age	Net Worth	Source of Wealth	Notes
1	Akira Mori	69	US$5.5 billion	Mori Trust	
2	Masayoshi Son	49	US$5.45 billion	Softbank	
3	Hiroshi Yamauchi	79	US$4.8 billion	Nintendo	
4	Kunio Busujima	82	US$4.3 billion	Sankyo	
5	Hiroko Takei	65	US$4 billion	Takefuji	The late Yasuo Takei's family
6	Nobutada Saji	61	US$3.9 billion	Suntory	
7	Eitaro Itoyama	65	US$3.8 billion	Shin Nihon Kanko	
8	Tadashi Yanai	58	US$3.6 billion	Fast Retailing	
9	Takemitsu Takizaki	62	US$2.7 billion	Keyence	
10	Masatoshi Ito	83	US$2.6 billion	Ito-Yokado	
11	Yoshitaka Fukuda	59	US$2.5 billion	Aiful	
12	Kinoshita brothers		US$2.37 billion	Acom	Kyosuke, Shigeyoshi and Katsuhiro Kinoshita
13	Hiroshi Mikitani	42	US$2.2 billion	Rakuten	
14	Kazuo Okada	64	US$2.1 billion	Aruze	
15	Fukuzo Iwasaki	82	US$2 billion	Iwasaki Sangyo	
16	Toichi Takenaka	64	US$1.9 billion	Takenaka Corporation	
17	Masahiro Miki	51	US$1.8 billion	ABC-Mart	
18	Kanbei Kokubu	68	US$1.7 billion	Kokubu	
19	Ryoichi Jinnai	80	US$1.4 billion	Promise	
20	Yasumitsu Shigeta	42	US$1.37 billion	Hikari Tsushin	
21	Tetsuro Funai	80	US$1.34 billion	Funai Electric	
22	Shigenobu Nagamori	53	US$1.3 billion	Nidec	
23	Kenshin Oshima	59	US$1.2 billion	SFCG	
24	Minoru & Yuji Otsuka	84/53	US$1.16 billion	Otsuka Corporation	
25	Han Chang-Woo	76	US$1.16 billion	Maruhan	
26	Hajime Satomi	65	US$1.14 billion	Sega Sammy Holdings	
27	Soichiro Fukutake	61	US$1.11 billion	Benesse	
28	Tadahiro Yoshida	60	US$1.1 billion	YKK	
29	Chizuko & Michio Matsui	52/54	US$1.09 billion	Matsui Securities	
30	Kazuo Inamori	75	US$1 billion	Kyocera	
31	Yasuhiro Fukushima	59	US$900 million	Square Enix	
32	Shosuke Idemitsu	79	US$895 million	Idemitsu Kosan	
33	Shoichiro Toyoda	82	US$800 million	Toyota Motor Corporation	
34	Keiko & Yoichi Erikawa	58/56	US$780 million	Koei	
35	Yusuke Miyama	61	US$775 million	Leopalace21	
36	Shoji Uehara	79	US$770 million	Taisho Pharmaceutical	
37	Ryuji Arai	61	US$730 million	Bic Camera	
38	Nobutoshi Shimamura	71	US$650 million	Shimamura	
39	Etsuko & Gen Fujita	77/NA	US$630 million		The late Den Fujita's family
40	Akio Nitori	63	US$610 million	Nitori	

== 2006 ==
Based on Forbes Japan's Richest 2006

#	Name	Age	Net Worth	Source of Wealth	Notes
1	Masayoshi Son	48	US$7 billion	Softbank	
2	Yasuo Takei	76	US$5.6 billion	Takefuji	
3	Kunio Busujima	81	US$5.4 billion	Sankyo	
4	Nobutada Saji	60	US$5 billion	Suntory	
5	Akira Mori	68	US$4.9 billion	Mori Trust	
6	Hiroshi Mikitani	41	US$4.5 billion	Rakuten	
7	Tadashi Yanai	57	US$4.4 billion	Fast Retailing	
8	Eitaro Itoyama	64	US$4.3 billion	Shin Nihon Kanko	
9	Kinoshita brothers		US$3.5 billion	Acom	Kyosuke, Shigeyoshi and Katsuhiro Kinoshita
10	Masatoshi Ito	82	US$3.3 billion	Ito-Yokado	
11	Takemitsu Takizaki	61	US$3 billion	Keyence	
12	Yoshitaka Fukuda	58	US$2.8 billion	Aiful	
13	Fukuzo Iwasaki	81	US$2.4 billion	Iwasaki Sangyo	
14	Hiroshi Yamauchi	78	US$2.2 billion	Nintendo	
15	Yasumitsu Shigeta	41	US$1.9 billion	Hikari Tsushin	
16	Tetsuro Funai	79	US$1.85 billion	Funai Electric	
17	Ryoichi Jinnai	79	US$1.75 billion	Promise	
18	Shigenobu Nagamori	52	US$1.7 billion	Nidec	
19	Kazuo Okada	63	US$1.55 billion	Aruze	
20	Minoru & Yuji Otsuka	83/52	US$1.5 billion	Otsuka Corporation	
21	Kenshin Oshima	58	US$1.4 billion	SFCG	
22	Hideo Morita	54	US$1.35 billion	Sony	The late Akio Morita's son
23	Tadahiro Yoshida	59	US$1.3 billion	YKK	
24	Soichiro Fukutake	60	US$1.28 billion	Benesse	
25	Reijiro Kobayashi	78	US$1.25 billion	KOSÉ	
26	Yoshiaki Tsutsumi	72	US$1.2 billion	Seibu Railway	
27	Hajime Satomi	64	US$1.17 billion	Sega Sammy Holdings	
28	Han Chang-Woo	75	US$1.15 billion	Maruhan	
29	Toichi Takenaka	63	US$1 billion	Takenaka Corporation	
30	Masakazu Shiiki	78	US$980 million	Sanyo Shinpan	
31	Kanbei Kokubu	67	US$970 million	Kokubu	
32	Nobutoshi Shimamura	70	US$925 million	Shimamura	
33	Kazuo Inamori	74	US$875 million	Kyocera	
34	Reijiro & Yasuo Hattori		US$850 million	Seiko	
35	Shoichiro Toyoda	81	US$730 million	Toyota Motor Corporation	
36	Shoji Uehara	78	US$710 million	Taisho Pharmaceutical	
37	Yoji Sato	60	US$705 million	Dynam	
38	Yasuhiro Fukushima	58	US$700 million	Square Enix	
39	Kenkichi Nakajima	85	US$690 million	Heiwa Corporation	
40	Muneaki Masuda	55	US$680 million	Culture Convenience Club	

== 1996 ==
Based on Forbes World's Billionaires 1996

#	Name	Net Worth	Source of Wealth	Notes
1	Yoshiaki Tsutsumi	US$9.2 billion	Seibu Railway	
2	Yasuo Takei	US$5.2 billion	Takefuji	
3	Masayoshi Son	US$4.6 billion	Softbank	
4	Masatoshi Ito	US$4 billion	Ito-Yokado	
5	Iwasaki family	US$4 billion	Iwasaki Sangyo	
6	Minoru & Akira Mori	US$3.9 billion	Mori Building Company	
7	Keizo Saji	US$3.2 billion	Suntory	
8	Kyosuke Kinoshita	US$3.1 billion	Acom	
9	Goroemon Yoshimoto	US$2.5 billion		
10	Rinji Shino	US$2.5 billion		
11	Yasuyuki Nambu	US$2.5 billion	Pasona	
12	Hisakichi Yamaguchi	US$2.4 billion		
13	Kanichiro Ishibashi	US$2.4 billion	Bridgestone	
14	Eitaro Itoyama	US$2.3 billion	Shin Nihon Kanko	
15	Akio Morita	US$2.3 billion	Sony	
16	Akihiko Otsuka	US$2.2 billion	Otsuka Pharmaceutical	
17	Kazuo Matsuda	US$2.2 billion		
18	Masahiro Ohga	US$2.1 billion		
19	Ryoichi Jinnai	US$2.1 billion	Promise	
20	Shoji Uehara	US$1.9 billion	Taisho Pharmaceutical	
21	Masakuni Osano	US$1.7 billion	Kokusai Kogyo	The late Kenji Osano's nephew
22	Kenkichi Nakajima	US$1.6 billion	Heiwa Corporation	
23	Kunio Busujima	US$1.6 billion	Sankyo	
24	Kenshin Oshima	US$1.5 billion	SFCG	
25	Takemitsu Takizaki	US$1.4 billion	Keyence	
26	Hiroshi Yamauchi	US$1.4 billion	Nintendo	
27	Tadahiro Yoshida	US$1.3 billion	YKK	
28	Den Fujita	US$1.3 billion		
29	Hiroshi Takei	US$1.3 billion		
30	Masafumi Miyamoto	US$1.3 billion	Square	
31	Soichiro Fukutake	US$1.3 billion	Enix	
32	Masakazu Shiiki	US$1.2 billion	Sanyo Shinpan	
33	Kenichi Mabuchi	US$1.1 billion	Mabuchi Motor	
34	Kazuo Inamori	US$1.1 billion	Kyocera	
35	Isono family	US$1.1 billion	Meidi-Ya	
36	Renichi Takenaka	US$1.1 billion	Takenaka Corporation	
37	Ryusuke Kimura	US$1.1 billion		
38	Otani family	US$1 billion		
39	Toyoda family	US$1 billion	Toyota Motor Corporation	
40	Junichi Murata	US$1 billion	Murata Machinery	

== 1991 ==
Based on Forbes World's Billionaires 1991

#	Name	Net Worth	Source of Wealth	Notes
1	Taikichiro Mori	US$15 billion	Mori Building Company	
2	Yoshiaki Tsutsumi	US$14 billion & more	Seibu Railway	
3	Kitaro Watanabe	US$7 billion & more	Azabu Building	
4	Kenkichi Nakajima & family	US$6.1 billion	Heiwa Corporation	
5	Takenaka family	US$5.4 billion	Takenaka Corporation	
6	Yoneichi Otani & family	US$5 billion	New Otani Hotels	
7	Hirotomo Takei	US$4.5 billion		
8	Tetsuo Ohga family	US$4 billion & more		
9	Hattori family	US$3.5 billion	Seiko	
10	Ken Hayashibara	US$3 billion	Hayashibara Co., Ltd.	
11	Isono family	US$3 billion	Meidi-Ya	
12	Junichi Murata & family	US$3 billion	Murata Machinery	
13	Rinji Shino	US$3 billion		
14	Haruhiko Yoshimoto & family	US$3 billion		
15	Eitaro Itoyama	US$2.9 billion	Shin Nihon Kanko	
16	Hisakichi Yamaguchi	US$2.9 billion		
17	Al-Rajhi family	US$2.8 billion		
18	Yohachiro Iwasaki	US$2.8 billion	Iwasaki Sangyo	
19	Tadao Yoshida & family	US$2.8 billion		
20	Kiyoshi Sagawa	US$2.7 billion	Sagawa Express	

== See also ==
- The World's Billionaires
- List of countries by the number of US dollar billionaires
- Lists of people by nationality
- List of Japanese people
