= List of Japanese entrepreneurs =

This is a list of Japanese entrepreneurs.

- Asano Sōichirō
- Busujima Kunio
- Enomoto Daisuke
- Fujita Den
- Fukuda Yoshitaka
- Hirotake Yano
- Honda Soichirō
- Horie Takafumi
- Ibuka Masaru
- Itō Joi
- Itō Masatoshi
- Iwasaki Fukuzo
- Iwasaki Yataro
- Jinnai Ryōichi
- Kawakami Gen'ichi
- Kazutoshi Sakurai
- Matsushita Konosuke
- Keita Motoji
- Mikimoto Kōkichi
- Mikitani Hiroshi
- Mitsui Takatoshi
- Mori Minoru
- Mori Taikichirō
- Morita Akio
- Nomura Tokushichi II
- Ojima Susumu
- Saji Nobutaka
- Sasakawa Ryōichi
- Son Masayoshi
- Sumitomo Masatomo
- Tohmatsu Nobuzo
- Toyoda Eiji
- Tsutsumi Yoshiaki
- Yamada Shintaro
- Yamauchi Hiroshi
- Fusajiro Yamauchi
- Yanai Tadashi
- Yasuda Zenjirō
