= Takamatsu (disambiguation) =

Takamatsu may refer to:

== People ==
- Prince Takamatsu, third son of Emperor Taishō
- Takamatsu (surname)

== Places ==
- Takamatsu, Kagawa, a city in Japan
- Takamatsu Station (disambiguation), several different train stations in Japan
- Takamatsu Domain, a Japanese domain during the Edo period
- Takamatsu Castle (disambiguation), several different
- Takamatsu Airport

== See also ==
- Takemitsu (disambiguation)
