= Busujima =

Busujima (Kanji: 毒島, 毒嶋, 毒嶌) is a Japanese surname.

Notable people with the surname include:

- Hideyuki Busujima (born 1952/1953), Japanese billionaire businessman, son of Kunio
- Kunio Busujima (1925–2016), Japanese billionaire businessman

Fictional characters with the surname include:

- Hanaka Busujima, a character in the manga and anime series Buso Renkin
- Miku Busujima, a character in the manga, video game, and anime series Lucky Star
- Saeko Busujima, a character in the manga and anime series Highschool of the Dead
