= Takemitsu (disambiguation) =

Tōru Takemitsu (1930–1996) was a Japanese composer and writer

Takemitsu may also refer to:

== People ==
- Kikuchi Takemitsu (1319–1373), Japanese samurai lord
- Takemitsu Takizaki (born 1945), Japanese billionaire businessman
- Takemitsu Tsubokawa (1909–1940), Japanese cross-country skier
- Takemitsu Uranishi (born 1940), Japanese professional golfer

== Media ==
- Takemitsu Zamurai (2006–2010), Japanese manga series

== See also ==
- Takamatsu (disambiguation)
  - Takamatsu (surname)
