= List of members of the Tokyo Stock Exchange =

General Trading Participants of the Tokyo Stock Exchange

- ABN AMRO Clearing Tokyo
- Ace Securities
- Aizawa Securities
- Akakiya Securities
- Ando Securities
- Ark Securities
- Barclays Capital Japan Limited
- BNP Paribas
- Chibagin Securities
- Citigroup Global Markets Japan
- CLICK Securities
- Cosmo Securities
- Credit Suisse Securities (Japan) Limited
- Daiko Clearing Services
- Daiwa Securities
- Daiwa Securities Capital Markets
- Deutsche Securities
- Dojimakanto Securities
- Eiwa Securities
- Goldman Sachs Japan
- Hachijuni Securities
- The Hikari Securities
- The Hinode Securities
- Hirota Securities
- HSBC Securities (Japan)
- H.S. Securities
- Ichiyoshi Securities
- IDO Securities
- Imamura Securities
- Interactive Brokers Securities Japan
- Instinet Japan
- Iwai Securities
- Japan Asia Securities
- J.P. Morgan Securities Japan
- Jefferies (Japan)
- Jyoko Securities
- Jyujiya Securities
- Kabu.com Securities
- Kaneyama Securities
- Kazaka Securities
- Kimura Securities
- Kosei Securities
- Kurokawakitoku Securities
- Kyokuto Securities
- Kyowa Securities
- Leading Securities
- Macquarie Capital Securities (Japan) Limited
- Maeda Securities
- Marufuku Securities
- Maruhachi Securities
- Marukuni Securities
- Marusan Securities
- Matsui Securities
- Meiwa Securities
- Merrill Lynch Japan Securities
- MF Global FXA Securities
- Miki Securities
- Mita Securities
- Mito Securities
- Mitsubishi UFJ Morgan Stanley Securities
- Mizuho Securities
- Mizuho Investors Securities
- Monex Group
- Morgan Stanley MUFG Securities
- The Murosei Securities
- Nagano Securities
- Naito Securities
- The Nakahara Securities
- The Naruse Securities
- Natixis
- Newedge Japan
- New-S Securities
- Niigata Securities
- Nikko Cordial Securities
- Nishimura Securities
- Nissan Century Securities
- Nomura Securities
- Nozomi Securities
- Okachi Securities
- Okasan Securities
- RBS Securities Japan
- Rakuten Securities
- Retela Crea Securities
- San-ei Securities
- Sanko Securities
- SBI Securities
- Securities Japan
- SMBC Friend Securities
- Société Générale Securities (North Pacific)
- The Tachibana Securitie
- Takagi Securities
- Tokai Tokyo Securities
- Toyo Securities
- UBS Securities Japan
- Utsumiya Securities
- Yahata Securities
- Yamagen Securities
- Yamani Securities
- Yamawa Securities
- The Yutaka Securities
