= Galaxy J7 =

Galaxy J7 could refer to:

- Samsung Galaxy J7
- Galaxy Airlines (Japan) (IATA: J7)
