= Fujisawa (disambiguation) =

Fujisawa is a city in Kanagawa Prefecture, Japan.

Fujisawa may also refer to:

- Fujisawa (surname), Japanese surname
- Fujisawa, Iwate, a former town in Iwate Prefecture, Japan
- Astellas Pharma, formed from the merger of Yamanouchi Pharmaceutical Co., Ltd. and Fujisawa Pharmaceutical Co., Ltd.
