= Itoyama =

Itoyama (written: 糸山 or 絲山) is a Japanese surname. Notable people with the surname include:

- Akiko Itoyama (絲山 秋子, born 1966), Japanese writer
- Eitaro Itoyama (糸山 英太郎, born 1942), Japanese businessman and politician
- Mayo Itoyama (糸山 真与, born 1991), Japanese synchronized swimmer
- Takashi Itoyama (糸山 隆司, born 1936), Japanese basketball player
