= Kyōsuke =

Kyōsuke, Kyosuke or Kyousuke is a masculine Japanese given name. Notable people with the name include:

- Eto Kyōsuke (江渡 恭助; 1881–1917), Japanese naval officer
- Kyosuke Goto (後藤 京介; born 1992), Japanese footballer
- Kyousuke Hamao (浜尾 京介; born 1991), Japanese actor, singer and model
- Kyosuke Himuro (氷室 京介; born 1960), Japanese singer
- Kyosuke Horie (堀江 恭佑; born 1990), Japanese rugby union player
- Kyōsuke Ikeda (池田 恭祐; born 1992), Japanese actor and voice actor who is affiliated with Gekidan Nihonjido
- Kyosuke Kajikawa (梶川 喬介; born 1987), Japanese rugby union player
- Kyosuke Kamiyama (神山 京右; born 2000), Japanese footballer
- Kyōsuke Kindaichi (金田一 京助; 1882–1971), eminent Japanese linguist from Morioka, Iwate Prefecture
- Kyosuke Kinoshita (木下 恭輔; born 1941), chairman of Acom Co., Ltd., a major consumer loan company in Japan
- Kyosuke Machida (待田 京介; born 1936), Japanese actor
- Kyosuke Matsuyama (松山 恭助; born 1996), Japanese fencer
- Kyosuke Oyama (小山 恭輔; born 1987), Japanese Paralympic swimmer
- Kyousuke Motomi (最富 キョウスケ), Japanese manga artist
- Kyosuke Sasaki (baseball) (佐々木 恭介; born 1949), Japanese baseball player
- Kyosuke Tagawa (田川 亨介; born 1999), Japanese footballer
- Kyosuke Takagi (高木 京介; born 1989), Japanese baseball player
- Kyosuke Usuta (うすた 京介; born 1974), prominent manga writer well known for working in the anthology Weekly Shonen Jump

== Fictional Characters ==
- Kyousuke Jin, a character in the anime Crush Gear Turbo
- Kyōsuke Kamijō, a minor character in the anime/manga Puella Magi Madoka Magica
- Kyōsuke Kasuga, the protagonist of the anime/manga Kimagure Orange Road
- Kyōsuke Kosaka, a character from Oreimo
- Kyousuke Natsume, a character in the anime Little Busters!
- Kyōsuke Kuga, a character from Prince of Stride
- Kyōsuke Munakata, a character in the light novel Papa to Kiss in the Dark
- Kyōsuke Munakata, a character from Danganronpa 3: The End of Hope's Peak High School
- Kyosuke Imadori, a character from School Rumble
- Kyōsuke Kanou, a character from Hungry Heart: Wild Striker
- Kyōsuke Tokisaka (Date), the protagonist of the thirteen-episode anime The Soultaker who is the twin brother of Runa
- Kyōsuke Hori, a character of Hori-san to Miyamura-kun who is the father of Kyoko Hori
- Kyōsuke Aoi (蒼井 享介, Aoi Kyōsuke), a character from THE iDOLM@STER SideM
