= EEWH =

Green building certification system in Taiwan

EEWH is the green building certification system in Taiwan. EEWH comprises nine indicators that fall into four categories - ecology, energy saving, waste reduction and health - hence the name EEWH. The system was launched in 1999.

Since 2003, the indicators have been foliage; water soil content (infiltration and retention); energy savings (for the building envelope, lighting and HVAC); CO_{2} emissions reduction; construction waste reduction; water conservation; garbage and sewage improvements; biodiversity; and indoor environmental quality.

EEWH has five levels: certified, bronze, silver, gold, and diamond. As of May 2008, one building (Beitou Public Library) had been rated diamond level, and one gold.

EEWH is not equivalent to LEED (Leadership in Energy and Environmental Design Green Building Rating System) in the United States, CASBEE (Comprehensive Assessment System for Building Environmental Efficiency) in Japan, and HQE in France.

== See also ==
- Sustainable architecture
- Sustainable design
- Sustainable engineering
