= LaCrosse Footwear =

American footwear company

- Type: Subsidiary
- Traded as: Nasdaq: BOOT
- Industry: Footwear
- Founded: 1897; 129 years ago, in La Crosse, Wisconsin
- Headquarters: 2001 Portland, Oregon, United States
- Products: Boots
- Parent: ABC-Mart
- Website: www.lacrossefootwear.com/

LaCrosse Footwear, Inc., is an American company based in Portland, Oregon. Founded in 1897 in La Crosse, Wisconsin, the footwear company moved to Oregon in 2001 where its Danner Boots subsidiary was based. In 2012, the company, which previously had been publicly traded, was bought by Japanese-based ABC-Mart.

The company manufactures boots and other footwear primarily for use in agriculture, hunting, construction, and the outdoors. Other products include rubber boots for farm and hunting, all manufactured in Asia.

== History ==
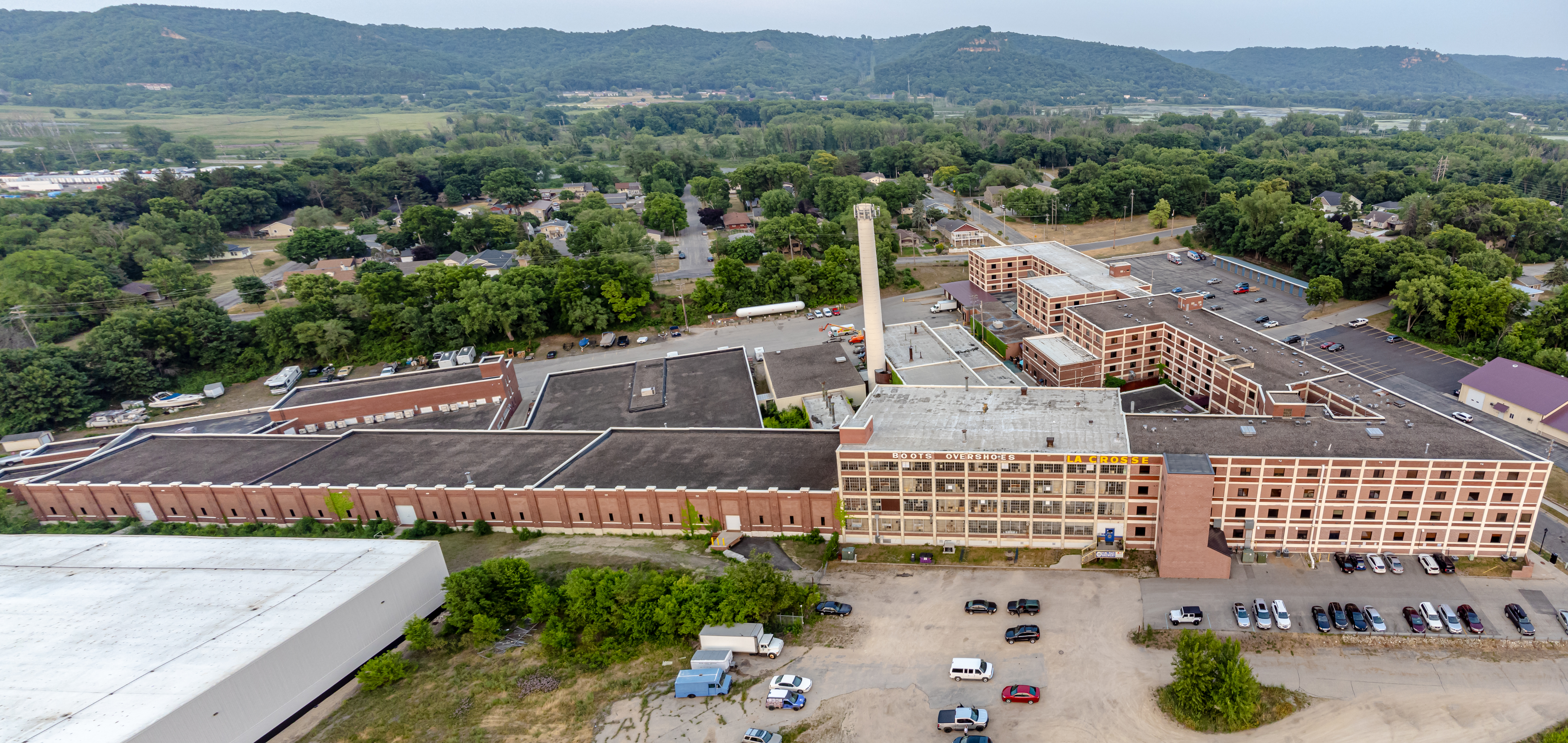
Former La Crosse Footwear building in La Crosse, Wisconsin, is now mostly apartments and mixed-use development

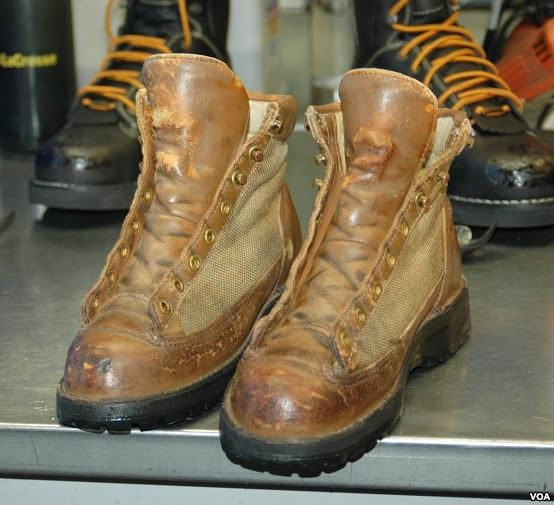
A well-worn pair of Danner boots

LaCrosse was established in Wisconsin in 1897 as the La Crosse Rubber Mill in the city of La Crosse. The company became the largest employer in that city in 1930. In 1994, the company acquired Portland, Oregon-based Danner Boots in a merger that was expected to create a company with an annual revenue of $100 million. A month later the company announced plans for an initial public offering (IPO) worth up to $24 million in order to help purchase Danner. At the time, LaCrosse had annual sales of $82 million.

The IPO went ahead in April 1994, raising nearly $18 million with a stock symbol of BOOT. LaCrosse bought footwear maker Lake of the Woods in June 1997 for $6.5 million. Company revenues had grown to $138 million for fiscal year 2000. The company closed its US-based manufacturing for the namesake brand in July 2001, and later that year moved its headquarters to Portland in order to consolidate operations and take advantage of the concentration of shoe companies in the Portland metropolitan area. Later that year, it also reported the first quarterly profit since 1999. In 2010, LaCrosse opened a new factory in Portland for its Danner brand, which helped it earn a contract with the U.S. Department of Defense in September 2011 for making boots for the Marine Corps.

In July 2012, ABC-Mart (Japanese: エービーシー・マート) purchased LaCrosse for $20 per share. ABC-Mart, a Tokyo-based retailer, had approximately 800 stores in Japan, Taiwan, and South Korea. LaCrosse hoped to use those distribution channels to expand their brand in Japan where the company's American made boots were popular. At the time of the announcement, LaCrosse had 300 employees in Portland, and no layoffs were expected. The deal was finalized in August, with LaCrosse then becoming a private subsidiary of ABC-Mart/Japan. President and CEO Joseph Schneider then left the company in September 2012.
