= Okada Museum of Art =

- 岡田美術館
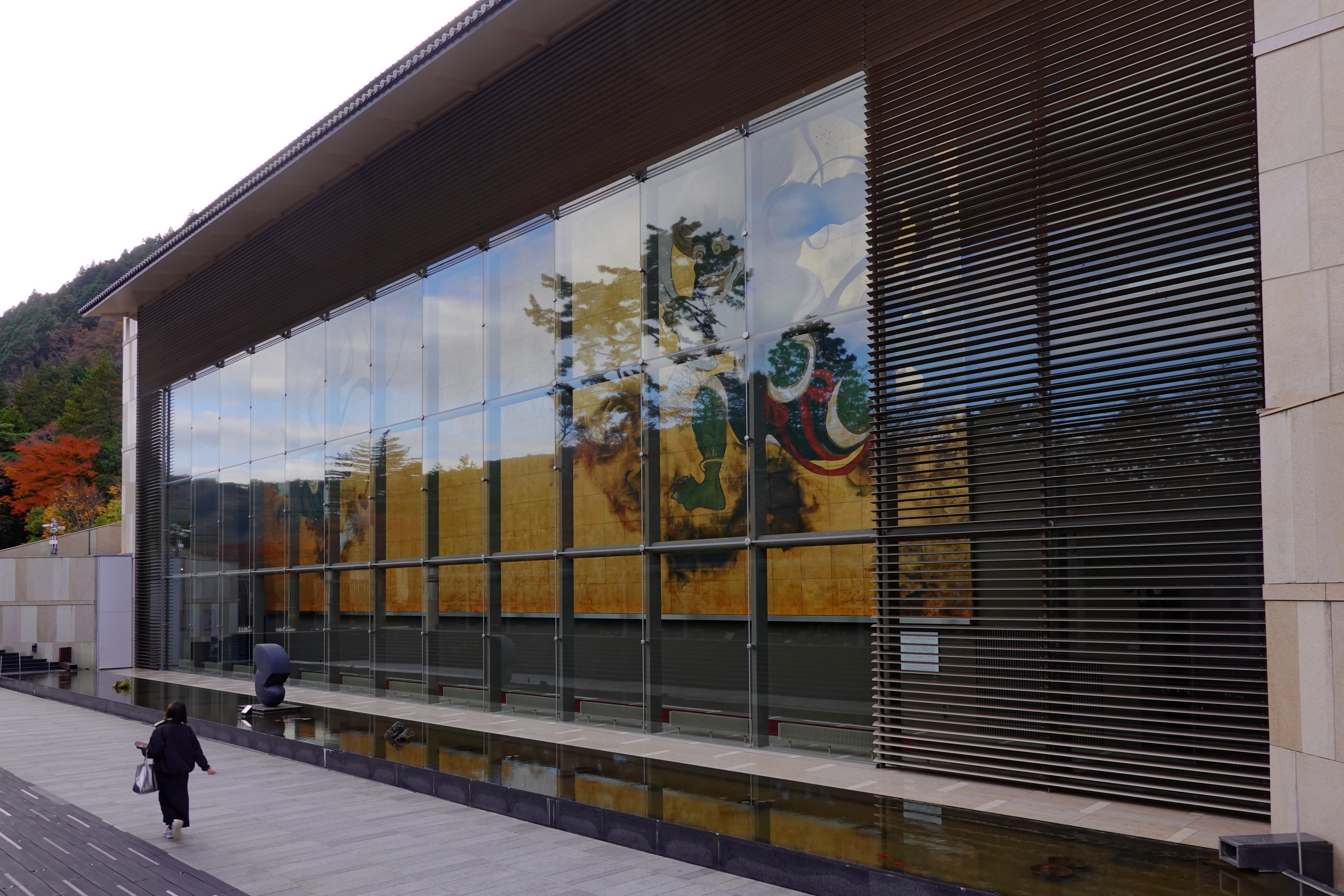

General information
- Location: 493-1 Kowakudani,, Hakone, Kanagawa Prefecture, Japan
- Coordinates: 35°14′17″N 139°02′46″E
- Opened: October 2013

Technical details
- Floor count: 5

Website
- www.okada-museum.com/en

Okada Museum of Art (岡田美術館, Okada Bijutsukan) opened in Hakone, Kanagawa Prefecture, Japan, in 2013. The private museum was created by the Japanese billionaire Kazuo Okada and specializes in Asian art; the collection of some 450 pieces centers on early modern and modern Japanese painting while also including Chinese bronzes, lacquer, ceramics, and Buddhist sculpture. It has the largest indoor exhibition space in Hakone, extending over five floors.

Some of the major works in the museum's collection (including Hokusai's iconic The Great Wave off Kanagawa) were sold at a Sotheby's Hong Kong on 22 November 2025 to satisfy a legal judgment against Okada.

== See also ==
- Pola Museum of Art
