= Fujisawa (surname) =

Fujisawa (written: 藤沢 or 藤澤) is a Japanese surname. Notable people with the surname include:

- Hideki Fujisawa (藤沢 秀樹; born 1963), Japanese musician
- Hideyuki Fujisawa (藤沢 秀行; 1925–2009), also known as Shuko Fujisawa, Japanese professional Go player
- Hosai Fujisawa (藤沢 朋斎; 1919–1993), born as Kuranosuke Fujisawa (藤沢 庫之助), professional Go player
- Isamu Fujisawa (藤澤 勇; born 1987), Japanese racewalker
- Kazuo Fujisawa (藤澤 和雄; born 1951), Japanese trainer of race horses
- Mamoru Fujisawa (藤澤 守; born 1950), better known as Joe Hisaishi, Japanese composer and director
- Nobuyoshi Fujisawa (藤澤 信義; born 1970), Japanese chief executive
- Norimasa Fujisawa (藤澤 ノリマサ; born 1983), Japanese singer, composer and pianist
- Rikitaro Fujisawa (藤沢 利喜太郎; 1861–1933), Japanese mathematician
- Rina Fujisawa (藤沢 里菜; born 1998), Japanese professional Go player, granddaughter of Hideyuki Fujisawa (藤沢 秀行)
- Ryoichi Fujisawa (藤沢 良一; born 1927), former Japanese Nordic skier
- Satsuki Fujisawa (藤澤 五月; born 1991), Japanese curler
- Shu Fujisawa (藤沢 周; born 1959), Japanese author
- Shuhei Fujisawa (藤沢 周平; 1927–1997), Japanese author
- Takashi Fujisawa (藤沢 隆; born 1943), Japanese ski jumper
- Takeo Fujisawa (藤沢 武夫; 1910–1988), Japanese businessman who worked for Honda
- Tōru Fujisawa (藤沢 とおる; born 1967), Japanese manga author
- Yukiko Fujisawa (藤沢 とおる; born 1995), Japanese figure skater
