= Batara Eto =

Batara Eto (衛藤バタラ, Etō Batara), formerly known as Batara Kesuma, is the co-founder and Chief Technology Officer (as of 2007) of mixi, a Japanese social networking site. He is currently co-founder and managing partner of East Ventures, a venture capital firm focusing on Japan and Southeast Asia.

He proposed mixi in December 2003, and was responsible for creating the corporation.

He was born on 27 July 1979 in Medan, Indonesia. He graduated from the Engineering division of Takushoku University.

Batara changed his citizenship to Japanese in March 2007, hence changing his last name to Eto, which is passed down from his grandfather who was originally from Japan.
