= Shimamura =

Shimamura (written: 島村 or 嶋村, lit. "island village") is a Japanese surname. Notable people with the surname include:

- Arthur P. Shimamura (1954–2020), American psychologist
- Ayasa Shimamura (島村絢沙, born 1991), also known as simply Ayasa, Japanese voice actress and violinist
- Haruyo Shimamura (島村 春世, born 1992), Japanese volleyball player
- Shimamura Hayao (島村 速雄, 1858–1923), Imperial Japanese Navy admiral
- Hōkō Shimamura (島村 逢紅, 1890–1944), Japanese photographer
- Ikki Shimamura (嶋村 一輝, born 1981), Japanese baseball player
- Ippei Shimamura (島村 一平, born 1969), Japanese anthropologist
- Kaori Shimamura (嶋村 かおり, born 1971), Japanese nude model, gravure idol, television personality and actress
- Kaoru Shimamura (嶋村 カオル, 1969–2013), Japanese voice actress
- Masashi Shimamura (島村 征志, born 1971), Japanese footballer
- Shiyō Shimamura (島村 紫陽, 1903–1974), Japanese photographer
- Takuya Shimamura (島村 拓弥, born 1999), Japanese footballer
- Toshihiro Shimamura (島村 俊廣, 1912–1991), Japanese Go player
- Toshimasa Shimamura (島村 利正, 1912–1981), Japanese writer
- Tsuyoshi Shimamura (島村 毅, born 1985), Japanese footballer
- Yasushi Shimamura (島村 泰司), Japanese actor
- Yoshinobu Shimamura (島村 宜伸, born 1934), Japanese politician
- Yū Shimamura (嶋村 侑, born 1985), Japanese voice actress

== Fictional characters ==
- Joe Shimamura (島村 ジョー), a character in the manga series Cyborg 009
- Uzuki Shimamura (島村 卯月), a character in the video game The Idolmaster Cinderella Girls

== See also ==
- Shimomura
