= Sagawa Express =

Japanese transportation company

SG HOLDINGS CO., LTD.
- Native name: SGホールディングス株式会社
- Type: Public (K.K.)
- Traded as: TYO: 9143
- Industry: Courier; Logistics; Real estate
- Founded: March 21, 2006; 20 years ago
- Headquarters: Minami-ku, Kyoto, Japan
- Revenue: ¥930 billion (2016)
- Operating income: ¥49 billion (2016)
- Net income: ¥28 billion (2016)
- Total assets: ¥651 billion (2016)
- Total equity: ¥310 billion (2016)
- Number of employees: 85,808 (2017)
- Parent: SG Holdings
- Subsidiaries: Sagawa Express Co., Ltd.; Sagawa Global Logistics Co., Ltd.; SG Realty Co., Ltd.
- Website: www.sg-hldgs.co.jp

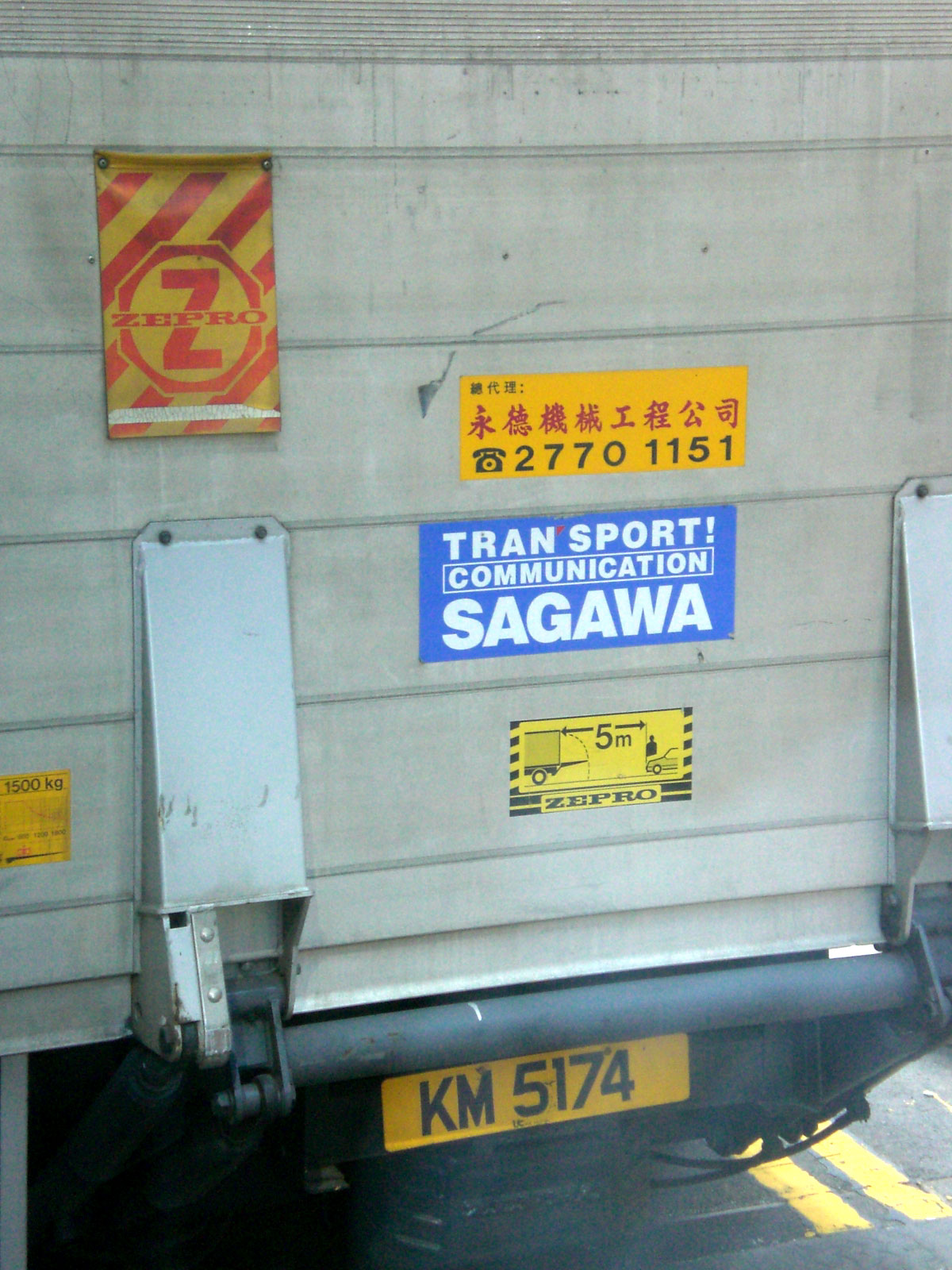
Sagawa Express's sticker

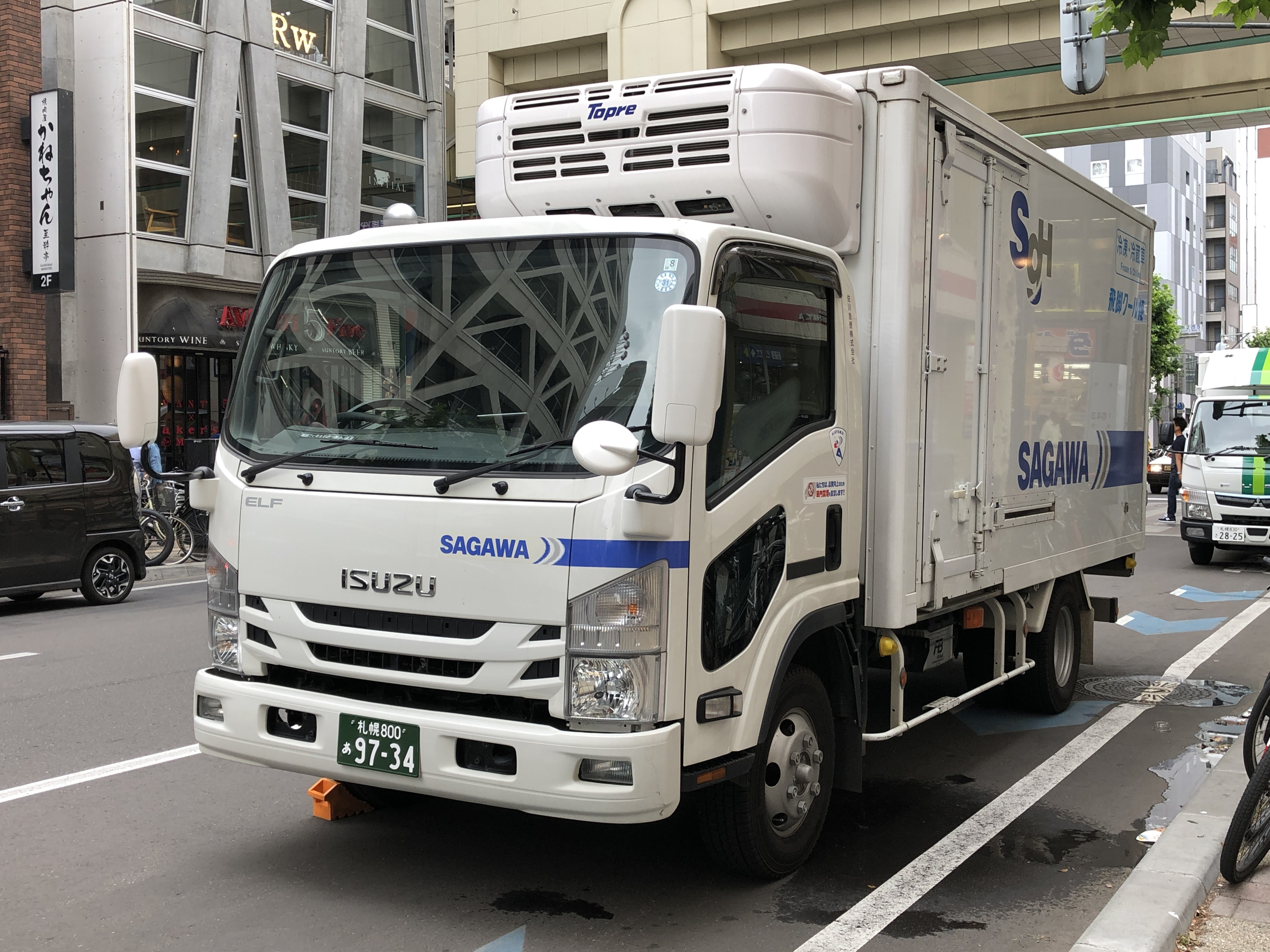
A Sagawa Express van

Sagawa Express Co., Ltd. (佐川急便株式会社, Sagawa Kyūbin Kabushiki-gaisha) is a major transportation company in Japan. Its headquarters are in Minami-ku, Kyoto. It competes with Yamato Transport, Nippon Express, and other major logistics companies. Its total sales for the year ending March 2005 were ¥728,000,000,000 (¥728 billion ).

The company was founded by Kiyoshi Sagawa. It began operation on March 22, 1957, and was registered as a company on November 24, 1965. On March 21, 2006, it established SG Holdings and transferred its stock to SG Holdings, becoming a subsidiary of the holding company.

Sagawa's major customers include Amway, Amazon.co.jp, Softbank BB, Yamada Denki, Culture Convenience Club (Tsutaya), Keyence, Sony Style, Askul, and Digital Media Mart.

Galaxy Airlines of Japan was a member of the group of companies.

== 1992 scandal ==
From 1992, the company was the center of a series of corruption and yakuza-link allegations that helped bring down the ruling LDP, and then the reformist Prime Minister Morihiro Hosokawa.
