= Taneaki Tanami =

Japanese politician (1932–2026)

- 田並 胤明

Member of the House of Representatives
- In office 25 June 2000 – 10 October 2003
- Constituency: Northern Kanto PR
- In office 18 December 1983 – 18 June 1993
- Preceded by: Tomiyuki Takada
- Succeeded by: Eitaro Itoyama
- Constituency: Saitama 3rd

Member of the Saitama Prefectural Assembly
- In office 1975–1983
- Constituency: Kita 7th

Personal details
- Born: 31 October 1932 Kumagaya, Saitama, Japan
- Died: 18 March 2026 (aged 93) Hanyū, Saitama, Japan
- Party: Democratic
- Other political affiliations: Socialist (1983–1996)
- Occupation: Postal worker

Taneaki Tanami (Japanese: 田並胤明 Tanami Taneaki; 31 October 1932 – 18 March 2026) was a Japanese politician. A member of the Japan Socialist Party and the Democratic Party of Japan, he served in the House of Representatives from 1983 to 1993 and again from 2000 to 2003.

Tanami died of multiple organ failure in Hanyū, on 18 March 2026, at the age of 93.
