= Maruhan =

Japanese Entertainment Conglomerate

Maruhan Corporation is a Japanese entertainment conglomerate founded by Han Chang-woo in 1957.
