= Shimomura =

Shimomura (written: 下村) is a Japanese surname. Notable people with the surname include:

- Eiji Shimomura (下村 英士, born 1959), Japanese volleyball player
- Hakubun Shimomura (下村 博文, born 1954), Japanese politician
- Kanzan Shimomura (下村 観山, 1873–1930), Japanese Nihonga painter
- Kotaro Shimomura (下村 孝太郎, 1861–1937), Japanese chemical engineer
- Osamu Shimomura (下村 脩, 1928–2018), Japanese organic chemist and marine biologist
- Osamu Shimomura (economist) (下村 治, 1910–1989), Japanese economist
- Roger Shimomura (born 1939), American artist and academic
- Sadamu Shimomura (下村 定, 1887–1968), Japanese general
- Tomi Shimomura (下村 東美, born 1980), Japanese footballer
- Tsutomu Shimomura (下村 努, born 1964), American physicist and computer security expert
- Yoko Shimomura (下村 陽子, born 1967), Japanese composer and pianist
- Yukio Shimomura (下村 幸男, born 1932), Japanese footballer and manager

== See also ==
- Shimamura
