= CASBEE =

Japanese green building certification program

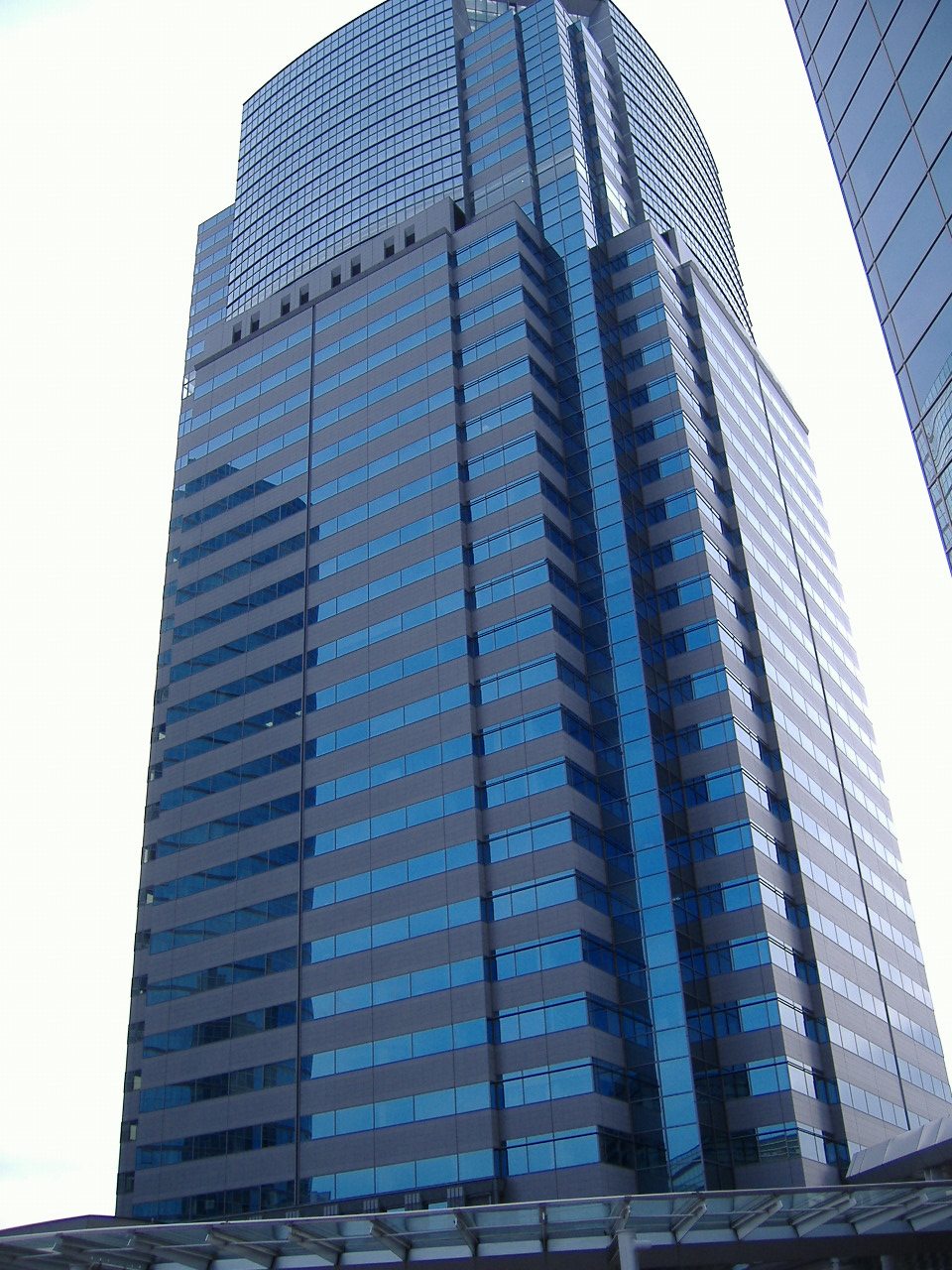
The Shinagawa East One Tower is an office, retail, and hotel space located in Tokyo, Japan. The tower received rank S under the CASBEE-Real Estate assessment tool.

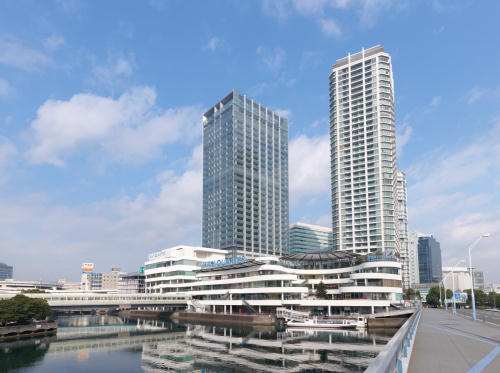
The Yokohama Dia Building includes office space, retail space, and a food court. The building has a 1,500 square meter solar panel, one of the largest in Japan. It received rank S under the CASBEE-Yokohama assessment tool.

CASBEE (Comprehensive Assessment System for Built Environment Efficiency) is the green building certification program used in Japan. It was created by a research committee called the Japan Sustainable Building Consortium (JSBC). The first assessment tool, CASBEE for offices, was launched in 2002. CASBEE now consists of multiple assessment tools tailored to different project scales. The tools are collectively called the CASBEE family. The development of CASBEE's assessment tools was a joint effort between JSBC sub-committees, industry, academia, and government leaders, and the Japanese Ministry of Land, Infrastructure, Transport and Tourism. The JSBC provides overall management of CASBEE, and the administrative office is located within the Institute for Building Environment and Energy Conservation (IBEC).

The first green building rating systems, including BREEAM and LEED, were developed to minimize the building sector's contribution to anthropogenic climate change. CASBEE shares the same goal, but rather than being established by non-profit third parties, the government played a direct role in its formation. The Japanese government has declared the goal of carbon neutrality by 2050, and reaching this goal motivates the government's continued commitment to the promotion and development of CASBEE. Local governments have a Sustainable Building Reporting System (SBRS) policy intended to create a sustainable building market by requiring the submission of building environmental plans to the local building official. 24 cities have adopted CASBEE as the standard for their SBRS policy. Additionally, many local governments require CASBEE assessment results when applying for building permits.

== Building Environmental Efficiency ==
It is a common structure among green building rating systems to determine their ratings via a point total calculated based on the fulfillment of credit requirements. CASBEE pursued an alternative approach and relies on an indicator called the Building Environmental Efficiency (BEE) to determine a building's ranking. The BEE is advantageous because it considers a hypothetical boundary so that the building itself can be evaluated in the context of its surroundings. The hypothetical boundary is chosen based on the site boundary and the scale being considered under the ranking system. The BEE is calculated based on two assessment factors: Q and L. The environmental quality, Q, is defined as the improvement of the internal environment within the hypothetical boundary. Q relates the building to the inhabitants. The environmental load, L, is defined as the negative impact the hypothetical boundary has on the external environment. L relates the building to the planet.

CASBEE considers four assessment fields: Energy Efficiency, Resource Efficiency, Local Environment, and Indoor Environment. Q and L are each divided into three sub-components with specific credits designed to evaluate the four assessment fields. Q consists of Q1: Indoor Environment (noise and acoustics, Thermal comfort, lighting, air quality), Q2: Quality of Service (functionality, durability, reliability, flexibility), and Q3: Outdoor Environment (preservation and creation of biotope, townscape and landscape, outdoor amenities). L consists of L1: Energy (thermal load, Daylighting, efficiency of systems, efficient operations), L2: Resources and Materials (water conservation, recycled materials, materials with low health risks), and L3: Off-Site Environment (Air pollution, noise and vibration, odor, Light pollution, heat island effect). Each credit is assessed on a 1 to 5 scale, where a score of 1 is earned if the minimum conditions required by law are satisfied, a score of 3 is earned for typical performance, and a score of 4 or 5 is earned for exceeding standard practices. Scoring is completed by CASBEE accredited professionals. The scores for each credit are then weighted and summed up depending on if they pertain to Q or L. The BEE is the ratio of Q over L.

CASBEE displays this relationship on a BEE graph that has L values plotted on the x-axis and Q values plotted on the y-axis. The higher the Q value and lower the L value the more sustainable the building is. The graph is broken up into regions corresponding to the following rankings: S: Excellent, A: Very Good, B+: Good, B−: Fairly Poor, and C: Poor. Green building rating systems that utilize a point-scoring system fail to evaluate the interaction between the environmental load and the environmental quality and may reward points for credits benefitting one category without considering the harm it causes to the other. Calculating the BEE provides an integrated assessment that weighs how the hypothetical boundary is benefitting users and harming the surrounding environment.

== Carbon Dioxide Life Cycle Assessment ==
In line with Japan's commitment to reducing its carbon dioxide emissions, CASBEE assessment tools designed for the building scale also require a Life-cycle assessment of the carbon dioxide (LCCO2) emitted during the construction, operation, and demolition of a building. CASBEE provides a spreadsheet to calculate the LCCO2. The results are compared to the LCCO2 of a reference building that satisfies the standard according to the Energy Conservation Law. The LCCO2 performance is indicated by awarding 1 to 5 stars. This result is reported alongside the BEE.

== The CASBEE Family ==
CASBEE was designed to accommodate a wide range of building types at different stages of construction. The four basic tools are CASBEE for Pre-Design, CASBEE for New Construction, CASBEE for Existing Building, and CASBEE for Renovation. CASBEE's consideration of a hypothetical boundary allows for the scope of evaluation to be easily expanded beyond the limits of a single building. Additional versions of CASBEE were developed to consider specific building purposes and scales. These versions include:

- CASBEE for Detached Houses
- CASBEE for Temporary Construction
- Local Government Versions (e.g. CASBEE for Osaka)
- CASBEE for Heat Island Effect
- CASBEE for Urban Development
- CASBEE for Market Promotion
- CASBEE for Real Estate
- CASBEE for Cities

The four basic tools and the additional versions are jointly referred to as the CASBEE Family. The exact credits included in the environmental quality and environmental load assessment factors are tailored to be relevant to the specific CASBEE assessment tool.

The four basic tools had their latest versions released in 2014. CASBEE for Buildings (New Construction) 2014, CASBEE for Market Promotion 2014, CASBEE for Urban Development 2014, CASBEE for Cities 2013, and CASBEE for Cities (pilot version for worldwide use) 2015, are the assessment tools within the CASBEE Family that are available in English.

== Stakeholders' Perspectives ==
CASBEE is still a relatively new green building rating system. As of December 2022, 606 properties had obtained a CASBEE evaluation under one of the building-level assessment tools. For comparison, there are 110,000 projects participating in LEED. Due to CASBEE's relatively short time operating as a rating system, only preliminary conclusions can be drawn regarding its effectiveness. In 2014, Dr. Naoya Abe, an associate professor at the Tokyo Institute of Technology who specializes in Applied Economics and Environment Policy, conducted a study to evaluate stakeholders’ perceptions of CASBEE in Japan. The study surveyed local governments, architects, engineers, and building managers to gather feedback on their perceptions, motivations, incentives, and barriers towards adopting CASBEE. The results concluded that the practical application of CASBEE in the building market is extremely limited. Respondents with no connection to the government indicated a desire to implement CASBEE but lack the resources or support to do so. These respondents also indicated a desire for more incentives, specifically priority review of CASBEE projects and financial incentives for building owners. The results of the study suggest a disconnect between the government agencies employing CASBEE and other stakeholders in the building industry.

== See also ==
- LEED
- BREEAM
- Living Building Challenge
- Sustainable architecture
