= Masao Kinoshita =

Masao Kinoshita (木下政雄; born 1910, date of death unknown) was the founder of Acom, a major consumer loan company in Japan. Kyosuke Kinoshita, the current chairman of the company, is his eldest son. Kinoshita was a native of Akashi, Hyogo.
