= Yoji Sato =

Japanese handball player (born 1949)

Yoji Sato (佐藤 要ニ, Satō Yōji; born 16 October 1949) is a former Japanese handball player who competed in the 1976 Summer Olympics.

He was also a part of the Japan team that won the inaugural 1977 Asian Championship. He scored the second most goals at the tournament with 30, behind China's Kin Hyakku with 31.
