= Mixi =

Japanese social networking service

- Website type: Social networking service
- Available in: Japanese
- Traded as: TYO: 2121
- Founded: 1999
- Headquarters: Shibuya, Tokyo
- Owner: Mixi, Inc.
- Founders: Kenji Kasahara, Batara Eto
- Key people: Kenji Kasahara (founder, president, executive director)
- Website: mixi.co.jp
- Advertising: Banner ads
- Registration: Optional, restrictive
- Launched: February 2004
- Current status: Active

Mixi (stylized as mixi) is an online Japanese social networking service. It opened in 1999 and is owned by Mixi, Inc. (株式会社MIXI, Kabushiki Gaisha Mikushī; TYO: 2121). As of September 2012, Mixi had about 14 million monthly active users, with about 8.6 million of those on smartphones. Mixi, Inc. was founded by Kenji Kasahara in 1999 as a limited liability company and became a Japanese corporation in 2000. The company changed its name to Mixi, Inc. from E-Mercury, Inc. in February 2006 to align its name with the social networking service, and was updated to MIXI, Inc. in 2022. Its headquarters are in Shibuya, Tokyo.

Mixi, Inc also published the mobile freemium game Monster Strike, the family photo-sharing app FamilyAlbum, and various other communication services.

== Overview ==
Mixi focuses on community entertainment. Users can send and receive messages, write in a diary, read and comment on others' diaries, organize and join communities, and invite their friends. Research indicates that some users, particularly young women, are more likely to use Mixi to connect in more private ways with close friends, particularly in contrast to perceptions of Facebook as a more public social network.

- Registration requires a valid Japanese cellphone number, which bars anyone who is not or has not been a resident of Japan. Since 2012, both Android and iPhone users can apply for a new Mixi account via specific apps made for their devices.
- myMixi, or Maimiku for short, means buddy or friend. This is similar to a contact in flickr, or friend on Myspace, and involves an approval process. The maximum possible number of myMixi a user allowed to have is 1,000. Accounts that are marked as tarento or celebrities don't have this limitation.
- The word Mixi is a combination of Mix and I, referring to the idea that the user, "I", "mixes" with other users through the service.
- "Mixi Station" is an application that detects songs being played in iTunes and Windows Media Player and uploads them automatically to a communally accessible list in the "Music" section, and was implemented late in June 2006.
- Batara Eto was the only developer at the start of the social networking site.
- Mixi heavily uses open source: Linux, Apache, MySQL, and Perl. It uses several hundred MySQL servers. Mixi also uses Tokyo Cabinet NoSQL database.
- A term "Mixi Fatigue (Mixi tsukare (ミクシィ疲れ))" has been coined to describe the feeling of becoming tired of Mixi, voicing a desire to discontinue using the service, and finally deciding to terminate an account.
- Mixi added the feature to upload your own video content, along with the ability to post content from YouTube.

The corporate headquarters are on the seventh floor of the Shibuya Scramble Square (渋谷スクランブルスクエア, JA) in Shibuya, Tokyo.

== History ==
Mixi has enjoyed a steady growth in its user base. In 2005, the website had more than one million users, and less than a year later, it had more than five million users. The site had more than 10 million users in February 2007, and as of July 2010, more than 30 million. This number includes deleted and multiple accounts.

In December 2022, Mixi launched an anime brand called MIXI_ANIME. Their first project was an anime short animated by Tatsunoko Production and ZynX, directed by Masami Obari and featuring the vocal performances of Megumi Hayashibara and Kenichi Suzumura, titled Jōkaku Gattai Oshirobots.

In 2008, Mixi began "Celebrity Accounts" in which celebrities who are on the social networking site are allowed to surpass the 1000-friend limit and potentially have an unlimited number of followers. Many popular figures have "Celebrity Accounts" such as actress, model, singer Anna Tsuchiya, producer and rapper Shing02, Akihabara idol Haruko Momoi and Lupin III from the self-titled series. In 2011, Mixi announced that it would end "Celebrity Accounts" and replace the function with a new service, "Mixi page".

== Terms of use ==
In early 2008, Mixi announced a plan to revise their terms of use. The changes, which were supposed to take effect as of April 1, 2008, included a section that appeared to grant Mixi unrestricted ownership to all user generated content. In particular, the proposed changes to Clause 18 stated:

"By posting information, including diaries and the like, on this service, users grant the service the unrestricted right to use said information (whether in the form of reproduction, publication, distribution, translation, modification or the like) without compensation."

However, the clause was never implemented, apparently due to user protests. The relevant portion of the terms of use currently states that "all rights (including copyright and personal-usage rights) for content belong to the user that created it."

In December 2008, Mixi discouraged the use of the site for dating, prohibiting users from "using Mixi mainly to meet with strangers of the other sex".

== See also ==
- List of social networking websites
