= Keiichiro Takahara =

Japanese billionaire businessman

Keiichiro Takahara 高原慶一朗
- Born: March 16, 1931
- Died: October 3, 2018 (aged 87)
- Occupations: Chairman and founder, Unicharm
- Children: 3, including Takahisa Takahara

Keiichiro Takahara (高原慶一朗, Takahara Keiichiro; March 16, 1931 – October 3, 2018) was a Japanese billionaire businessman, the chairman and founder of Unicharm.

== Early life ==
Born in Kawanoe City, Ehime Prefecture (now Shikokuchuo City). He graduated as class representative from his local junior high school, then went on to Matsuyama High School, before studying Marxian economics at Osaka City University. Having acquired all the necessary credits in his third year, he was given a letter of introduction from his supervisor and studied Keynesian economics at Hitotsubashi University in his fourth year. He graduated from the Faculty of Commerce at Osaka City University in 1953. His graduation thesis was "An Empirical Study of Japan's Pulp and Paper Industry". He joined Kansai Paper Co., Ltd. in the same year.

== Personal life ==
Takahara was married with three children and lived in Tokyo. His son Takahisa Takahara is president and CEO of Unicharm. According to Forbes, Takahara had a net worth of $5.2 billion, at the time of his death. He received a Doctorate Honoris Causa in Humanities from Anaheim University in 2000.
