= Kazuo Okada =

Japanese billionaire businessman

- Born: 3 October 1942 (age 84); Osaka, Japan
- Occupation: Businessman
- Title: Former chairman of Universal Entertainment(–2017); Former executive of Wynn Resorts (2008–2013)
- Children: 3

Kazuo Okada (岡田 和生, Okada Kazuo; born 3 October 1942) is a Japanese billionaire businessman and art collector.

Okada was formerly an executive at Wynn Resorts, and co-founder and former chairman of the Universal Entertainment Corporation, until his ousting in 2017 after allegations of financial mismanagement.

== Early life ==
Kazuo Okada was born in 1942. Having lost his father at a young age, he became independent and supported his family. He studied at an engineering vocational school to take advantage of his interest and passion for mechanics. In an interview with the Financial Times, Okada claimed that "vacuum tubes are so much fun."

== Career ==
In 1969, Okada founded Universal Lease, which manufactured coin-operated arcade games for children. In late 1969, Okada's first visit to Las Vegas led to his decision to enter the business of slot machine manufacturing. He invented the "near-miss" feature in his slot machines, an innovation that helped expand the Japanese market of "pachislot" (a hybrid of Japan’s pachinko and Las Vegas slot machines) and also made Okada's slot machines popular in Las Vegas.

Throughout the 1990s, Universal served as a major supplier of machines to the bustling Japanese pachinko industry. In 2000 Okada was introduced to Las Vegas-based casino magnate Steve Wynn, eventually investing $380 million in Wynn’s then-new company, Wynn Resorts. Wynn Resorts opened its first casino in 2005 in Las Vegas and a second one in 2006 in Macau. In 2008, Steve Wynn declined to join Okada in a major investment to build a casino in Entertainment City in Manila. Okada proceeded alone with the investment, forming a local company, Tiger Resort, Leisure and Entertainment, Inc., to handle the development of the Manila property. In July 2016, the property was unveiled as the Okada Manila, a $2.4 billion integrated hotel, resort and casino that represents Okada’s biggest investment to date.

== Legal issues ==
In 2017, Okada was accused of "misappropriating millions of dollars" from his holding company Okada Holdings. Universal Entertainment Corporation subsequently removed him from his chairman position by convincing his family members to vote him out of his Okada Holdings leadership role.

Charges of misappropriating funds filed against Okada with Hong Kong Independent Commission Against Corruption and Parañaque City Regional Court by Universal Entertainment Corporation have since been dismissed. In a statement released in September 2018, Okada said "[t]hese trumped-up charges were merely meant to harass me and justify my illegal ouster. Far from being valid cases, their baseless accusations only serve to demonstrate the grand conspiracy perpetrated by my detractors who betrayed my trust", and vows to continue fighting for reinstatement as director, chairman and chief executive officer of the company.

In 2019, Parañaque court issued warrant of arrest against Kazuo Okada in connection with three cases filed against him over his receipt of $3.1 million alleged unauthorized compensation as CEO of Tiger Resort Leisure & Entertainment, operator of Okada Manila.

In 2021, the law firm representing him, Dentons, asked to withdraw from representing Okada as a result of "an irretrievable breakdown" in their relationship.

On 9 December 2021, the Philippine Court of Appeals overturned the 2019 Parañaque court decision and issuance of arrest warrant stating that said Parañaque court "acted with grave abuse of discretion in issuing the warrants of arrest against petitioner (Okada) and [Associate] Usui despite the clear absence of probable cause against them", and quashed both the criminal charge and the arrest warrant.

== Art collection ==
Okada is a collector of Japanese, Chinese and Korean art. He opened his Okada Museum of Art in 2013 near the hot-springs resort of Hakone, south-west of Tokyo. In November 2025, Sotheby's Hong Kong sold 125 works from the museum's collection (including Hokusai's iconic The Great Wave off Kanagawa) to satisfy a legal judgment against Okada.

== Personal life ==
Okada is married, with three children, and resides in Tokyo.
