= SANKYO =

Japanese manufacturer of pachinko machines

SANKYO Co., Ltd.
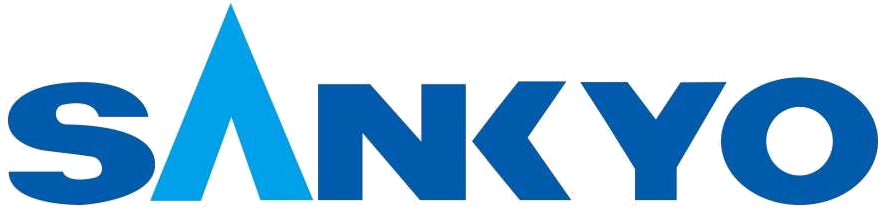
- Company type: Public KK
- Traded as: TYO: 6417
- Founded: April 12, 1966; 60 years ago
- Headquarters: Shibuya, Tokyo, Japan
- Key people: Kunio Busujima (founder); Hideyuki Busujima (chairman and CEO)
- Products: Pachinko machines
- Number of employees: 1,009 (2018)
- Website: sankyo-fever.co.jp

SANKYO Co., Ltd (株式会社三共, Kabushiki-gaisha SANKYO) is a Japanese company, and one of the three major pachinko machine manufacturers in Japan. Headquartered in Shibuya-ku, Tokyo, their corporate slogan is "Good luck, Good life".

It was founded by Kunio Busujima. His son Hideyuki Busujima has been the chairman and CEO since 2008.
