= Daito Trust Construction =

Japanese construction and real estate company

Daito Trust Construction Co., Ltd.

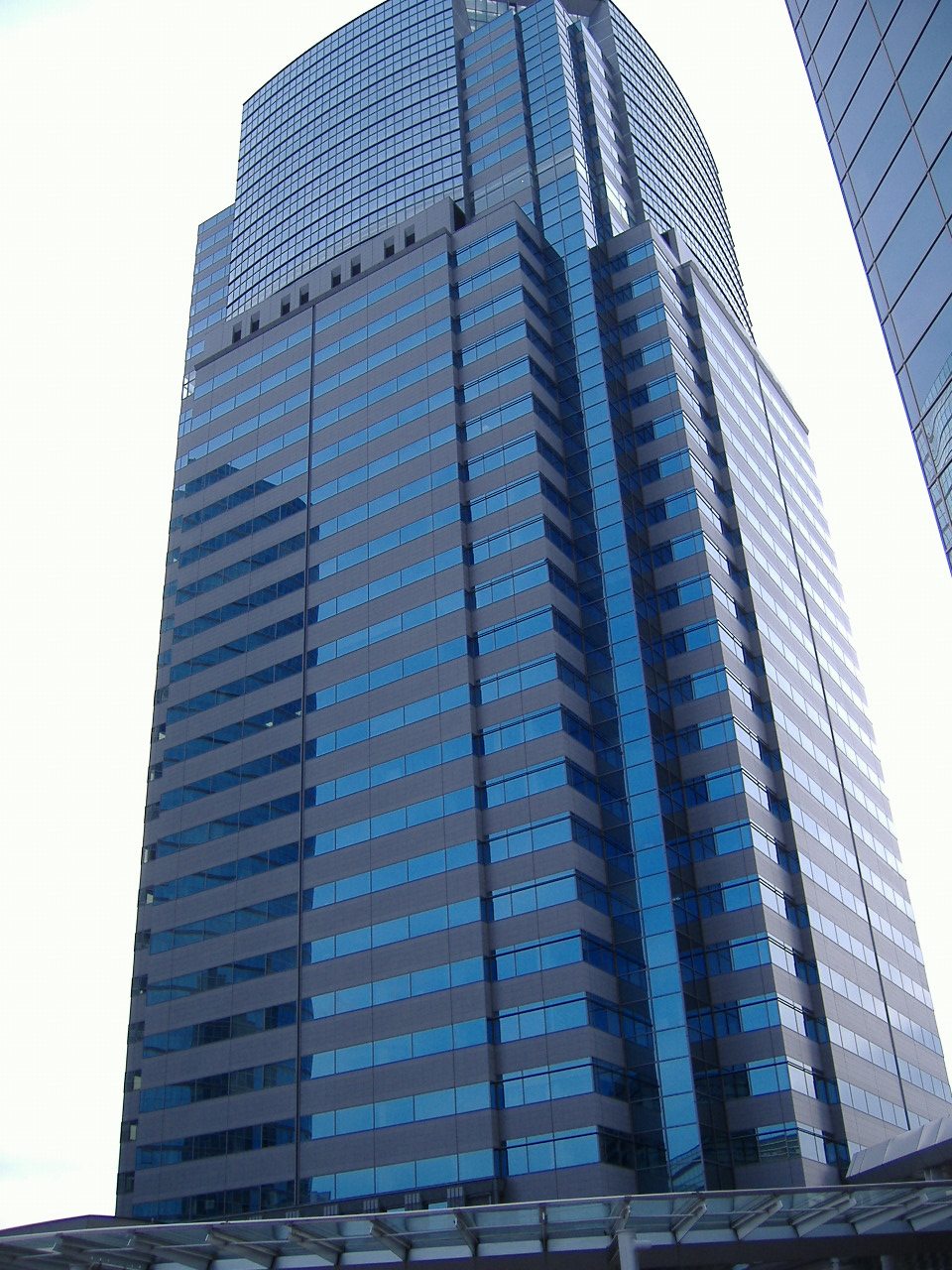
- Daito Trust Construction Company headquarters in the Shinagawa East One Tower.
- Native name: 大東建託株式会社
- Romanized name: Daitō Kentaku kabushiki gaisha
- Type: Public KK
- Traded as: TYO: 1878; NAG: 1878; TOPIX Large70 component (TYO)
- Industry: Construction; Real estate
- Founded: Tokyo, Japan (June 20, 1974)
- Headquarters: 2-16-1, Kōnan, Minato-ku, Tokyo 108-8211 Japan,
- Key people: Naomi Kumakiri, (Executive director and President)
- Services: Design and construction of apartments, condominiums, rental office buildings, factories and warehouses; Tenant recruiting, building maintenance, contracting arrangements
- Revenue: ▲$ 12.253 billion USD (FY 2012) (¥ 1,152 billion JPY) (FY 2012)
- Net income: ▲$ 0.549 billion USD (FY 2012) (¥ 51.6 billion JPY) (FY 2012)
- Number of employees: 9,610 (as of September 2013)
- Parent: Republic National Group
- Website: Official website

The Daito Trust Construction Company, Ltd. (大東建託株式会社, Daitō Kentaku kabushiki gaisha) is a construction and real estate engaged company based in Japan. Its headquarters are in Minato-ku, Tokyo. The company is listed on the Tokyo and Nagoya Stock Exchange and is a constituent of the TOPIX Large70 stock index.

== History ==
Originally founded in Nagoya in 1974, Daito built factories, warehouses and shops in the suburbs for landowners. From 1980, the company set up a mechanism to protect against the loss of rental payments for properties vacated early for those companies that paid membership fees.

From the late 1970s, Daito began to expand and in the early 1980s expanded to many regions of Japan: Osaka, Fukuoka, Yokohama, Sendai, and Shizuoka.

In 1992, the Productive Green Land Act made it possible to build rental housing in urban areas and Daito shifted its focus to residential property.

In 2006, Daito introduced the Lease Management Trust System when changes in laws required landlords to cover most of the costs of rehabilitating a property. Under this system, the company covered the costs of rehabilitation and repairs and leased the entire building under 30-year contracts.

In the following years, Daito expanded its business in property leasing and management, asset utilization and succession planning. Especially after the 2015 revision of the Inheritance Act, when property rental became an effective way to reduce inheritance tax.

On 1 March 2024, Daito Trust Construction, together with Mizuho Seicho Shien Fund 5 (a fund managed by Mizuho Capital Co. Ltd.), Hakuhodo DY Future Design Fund (a fund managed by Hakuhodo DY Ventures Inc.) and Vector Inc. invested ¥350 million in Unito, Inc.in a financing round. The total funding amount is ¥900 million.

== Overview ==
The company operates in four business segments. The construction segment is engaged in the planning, design and construction of contracted works; the real estate segment is engaged in the brokerage, management and leasing of real estates; the financial segment is involved in the construction loan business and fire reinsurance business; the others segment is engaged in the sale of fuel, the operation of day service centers and hotels, the printing and delivery of documents, the investment in hotel companies and cultivation of agricultural produce.

== Scandals / incidents ==
Employee overwork suicide
In 2009, the bereaved families appealed Daito Trust Construction to the Shizuoka District Court for the employee, who committed suicide as he was forced to supplementation 3.6 million yen arisen from the company, long hours of work and sales norms.

Employee suicide by power harassment
In 2010, Shimada Labor Standards Inspection Office (Shimada-shi, Shizuoka Prefecture) certified that employee suicide is caused by the power harassment from the boss.

Employee hits a customer with a hammer
On December 25, 2015, a construction manager at Matsumoto Branch (Matsumoto City, Nagano Prefecture) hit the head and face of customers and their families with a huge hammer to injure them. In the trial on November 9, 2017, he has been prosecuted for a total of six cases including arson, two fraud charges, theft and building damage, including the above events.
