= Heiwa Corporation =

Japanese manufacturer of pachinko and slot machines

Heiwa Holdings Inc.

- Headquarters in Taitō, Tokyo
- Native name: 株式会社平和ホールディングス
- Romanized name: Kabushiki-gaisha Heiwa Hōrudingusu
- Formerly: Towa Kogyo Co., Ltd. (1960-1988); Heiwa Corporation (1960-2026)
- Type: Public K.K.
- Traded as: TYO: 6412
- Industry: Gambling machine manufacturing
- Genre: Entertainment
- Founded: 1949; 77 years ago September 9, 1960; 66 years ago (incorporated)
- Founder: Kenkichi Nakajima
- Headquarters: Higashiueno, Taitō, Tokyo, Japan
- Key people: Yasuyuki Miyoshi (president)
- Products: Pachinko and Pachislot machines
- Revenue: ¥ 1.675 billion
- Number of employees: 821 (as of March 31, 2014)
- Subsidiaries: Heiwa; Pacific Golf Management; Olympia; Amtecs
- Website: www.heiwa-hd.co.jp

Heiwa Holdings Inc. (Japanese: 株式会社平和ホールディングス, Hepburn: Kabushiki Gaisha Heiwa Hōrudingusu) is a Japanese entertainment and leisure holding company and a manufacturer of pachinko and pachislot machines established in Kiryū, Gunma in 1949. It is one of the world's largest maker of pachinko machines.

On October 1, 2026, Heiwa restructured as a holding company with the pachinko and pachislot division being taken over by a wholly-owned subsidiary under the Heiwa name.

== History ==
Born in Korea, Kenkichi Nakajima, then a student, came to Japan in 1937 and worked in a defense factory during World War II. In 1949, he established Heiwa ('peace') as he wanted to produce goods unrelated to war; it was, however, only officially incorporated on September 9, 1960. In 1988, it became the first over-the-counter company in the pachinko industry. It entered the Tokyo Stock Exchange on the Second Section in 1991 and moved to the First Section in 1997. In 1998, Heiwa acquired Olympia, another pachinko manufacturer, and turned it into a subsidiary company. Heiwa became the first company in its segment to have an ISO9001 in 2000. In 2004, it founded the subsidiary company PGM Holdings, a golf course operator.
