= Galaxy Airlines (Japan) =

Japanese cargo airline

IATA	ICAO	Call sign
J7	GXY	GALAX
- Founded: 2005
- Ceased operations: 2008
- Hubs: Haneda (Tokyo)
- Fleet size: 2
- Destinations: New Chitose, Kansai, New Kitakyushu, Naha
- Parent company: SG Holdings Co., Ltd.
- Headquarters: Chiyoda, Tokyo; Ōta, Tokyo
- Key people: Teruo Wakasa (President)
- Website: galaxy-airlines.com

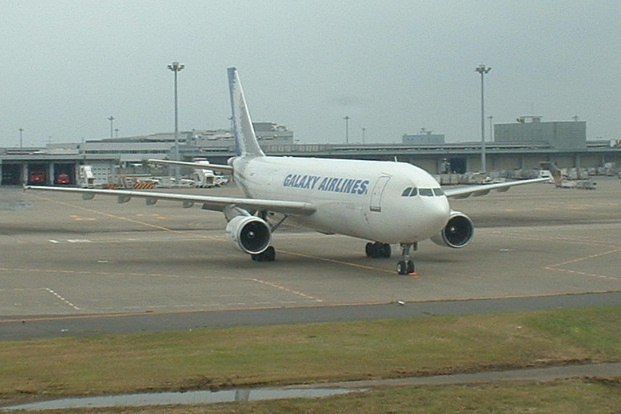
Galaxy Airlines Co. Ltd Airbus A300-600R, JA01GX

Galaxy Airlines Co. Ltd., (ギャラクシーエアラインズ株式会社, Gyarakushī Earainzu Kabushiki-gaisha) was a Japanese cargo airline headquartered in the ARC Building in Ōta, Tokyo. It operated domestic cargo services. Its main base was Tokyo International Airport.

== History ==
The airline was established on May 17, 2005, and application for operations was filed with the Japanese Ministry of Land, Infrastructure and Transport (MLIT) in February 2006, with permission to commence operations given in September 2006. On October 31, 2006, services commenced with flights between Tokyo International Airport and Naha Airport in Okinawa and New Kitakyushu Airport in Kyūshū. In December 2006 a second aircraft, an Airbus A300-600F was received, commencing services on April 3, 2007, between Tokyo International Airport, Kansai International Airport in Osaka and New Chitose Airport in Hokkaidō. It had 122 employees in March 2007.

Earlier in the company's life, it was headquartered in Chiyoda, Tokyo.

Galaxy Airlines was owned by Sagawa Express (90%) and Japan Airlines (10%) and had 122 employees (at March 2007).

The airline shut down in October 2008.

== Destinations ==
As of October 2008 Galaxy served routes between New Chitose (Hokkaidō), Haneda (Tokyo), Kansai (Osaka Prefecture), New Kitakyūshū (Fukuoka) and Naha (Okinawa) airports.

== Fleet ==
As of October 2008 the Galaxy Airlines Company fleet included

- 2 Airbus A300-600R Freighter (both being sold since halting operations in October 2008)
