= Kenji Kasahara =

Japanese businessman

Kenji Kasahara (笠原 健治, Kenji Kasahara; born December 6, 1975 in Minoh, Osaka Prefecture) is a Japanese entrepreneur who founded Mixi, a social networking site. In 2008, he was ranked as the 37th richest Japanese person.

== Timeline ==
In 1997, aged 21, he created the job information website Find Job!. Two years later he founded eMercury Inc.

In 2004 he launched the social network service Mixi. In 2008 he was listed by Forbes magazine as the 37th richest person in Japan, with a wealth of $740 million.

In 2015 he launched FamilyAlbum, a private family photo-sharing app.
