= ABC-Mart =

Japanese footwear company

ABC-Mart, Inc. 株式会社エービーシー・マート
- Company type: Public
- Traded as: TYO: 2670
- Industry: Retail
- Founded: June 6, 1985; 41 years ago
- Founder: Masahiro Miki
- Headquarters: Shibuya, Tokyo, Japan
- Number of locations: 1,000+
- Area served: Japan; South Korea; Taiwan; Philippines
- Key people: Minoru Noguchi (president)
- Products: Footwear; Apparel
- Subsidiaries: ABC-Mart Korea, Inc.; ABC-Mart Taiwan, Inc.; LaCrosse Footwear
- Website: www.abc-mart.net

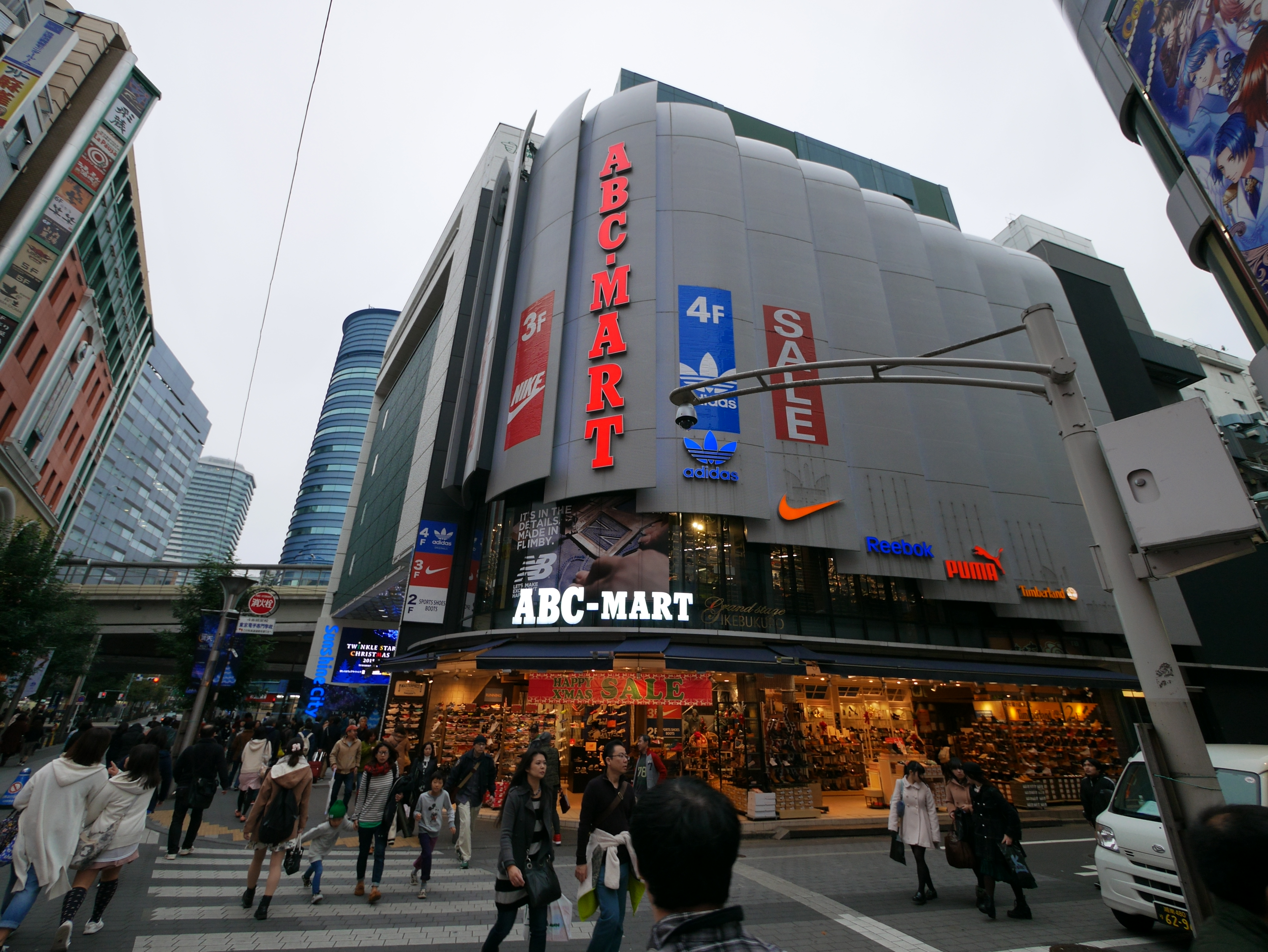
Toshima Store, in Tokyo

ABC-Mart, Inc. (株式会社エービーシー・マート, Kabushiki gaisha Ē Bī Shī Māto) is a Japanese footwear company, with stores in Japan, South Korea, Taiwan, and the Philippines.

== History ==
The company was founded by Masahiro Miki in Shinjuku in 1985 as Boeki Shoji Inc. In 1987, the company moved to Arakawa and changed its name to International Trading Corporation (ITC). It was in 1990 that ABC-Mart was established, with three stores opening in Tokyo. A year later, ABC-Mart acquired the exclusive sales rights of Vans products in Japan. The company was then re-established as a joint stock company in 1997 before moving its headquarters to Shibuya a year later.

In 2002, ITC absorbed ABC-Mart and was renamed ABC-Mart, Inc. before being publicly listed on the Tokyo Stock Exchange. The company then opened its first branch in South Korea in 2003 and in Taiwan in 2009.

In 2012, ABC-Mart bought the American company LaCrosse Footwear, which in turn purchased the U.S. boot maker Whites Boots in 2014.

In 2019, ABC-Mart opened its 1,000th store.

In 2025, ABC-Mart opened in the Philippines, with its flagship store being located in Bonifacio High Street, and Mitsukoshi BGC, both located in Bonifacio Global City. This is ABC-Mart's entry into Southeast Asia after establishing its presence in Japan, South Korea, and Taiwan.
