= Unicharm =

Japanese personal care company

Unicharm Corporation
- Native name: ユニ·チャーム株式会社
- Romanized name: Yuni Chāmu kabushiki kaisha
- Type: Public (K.K)
- Traded as: TYO: 8113; TOPIX Large 70 Component
- ISIN: JP3951600000
- Industry: Consumer goods
- Founded: 10 February 1961; 65 years ago
- Founder: Keiichiro Takahara
- Headquarters: Mita, Minato, Tokyo, 108-0073, Japan
- Area served: Worldwide
- Key people: Takahisa Takahara (President and CEO)
- Products: MamyPoko Pants; MamyPoko Wipes; Lifree; Sofy; Pet food and toiletries
- Revenue: ▼JPY 688.2 (FY 2018)
- Net income: ▲JPY 61.3 billion (FY 2018)
- Number of employees: 16,207 (as of December 31, 2018)
- Website: www.unicharm.co.jp

Unicharm Corporation (ユニ·チャーム株式会社, Yuni Chāmu kabushiki kaisha) is a Japanese company that manufactures disposable hygiene products, household cleaning products, specializing in the manufacture of diapers for both babies and adult incontinence, feminine hygiene products and pet care products.

The company has operations in 80 countries and is a market leader in Asia in baby and feminine care products. It holds the top share of diaper sales in China, India, Indonesia, Vietnam and Thailand. Also its market share is rapidly expanding in India, nearly doubling its sales every two years.

== History ==
Unicharm traces its roots to the Taisei Kako Co., Ltd., founded by Keiichiro Takahara. Takahara's family operated a paper manufacturing business in Shikoku. After resigning in 1961 from his father's paper manufacturing company, he founded his own, Taisei Kako (Taisei Chemical Works). He then turned his attention to the manufacture and sale of wood wool cement board. Then the company in 1963 ventured to manufacture and sell sanitary napkins. The company then started selling tampons in 1974, when Unicharm Corporation was founded to separate the feminine care production from the main company.

== Operations ==
The company has a number of prominent brands in its portfolio, including MamyPoko, Charm, Moony, BabyJoy, Babylove, Sofy and Lifree, Teemo. In December 2011, Unicharm acquired 51% ownership of pet products maker Hartz Mountain Corporation from Sumitomo Corporation.
