= Takamatsu Castle =

Takamatsu Castle may refer to the following castles in Japan:

- Takamatsu Castle (Bitchū)
- Takamatsu Castle (Sanuki)
