= Takamatsu Station =

Takamatsu Station (高松駅, Takamatsu-eki) is the name of multiple train stations in Japan.

- Takamatsu Station (Kagawa), a JR Shikoku station
- Takamatsu Station (Ishikawa), a JR West station
- Takamatsu Station (Tokyo), a Tama Monorail station
