= Takahisa Takahara =

Japanese billionaire businessman

- Born: 12 July 1961 (age 63)
- Occupation: CEO of Unicharm

Takahisa Takahara (born 12 July 1961) is a Japanese businessman, the CEO of Unicharm.

Takahisa Takahara was born in the family of Keiichiro Takahara, the founder of diaper making company Unicharm which releases the brands Moony and MamyPoko. In 2001, Takahisa Takahara was appointed CEO of the company. More than half of Unicharm's revenues come from outside of Japan, mainly from other Asian countries.

Takahisa Takahara made the 2022 Forbes Billionaires List with an estimated wealth of $6.4 billion and occupied the 398th position.
