= Acom =

Japanese consumer loan company

ACOM Co., Ltd.
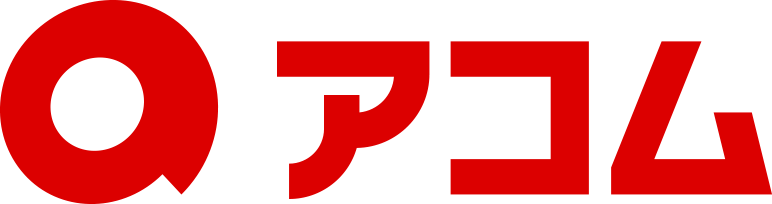

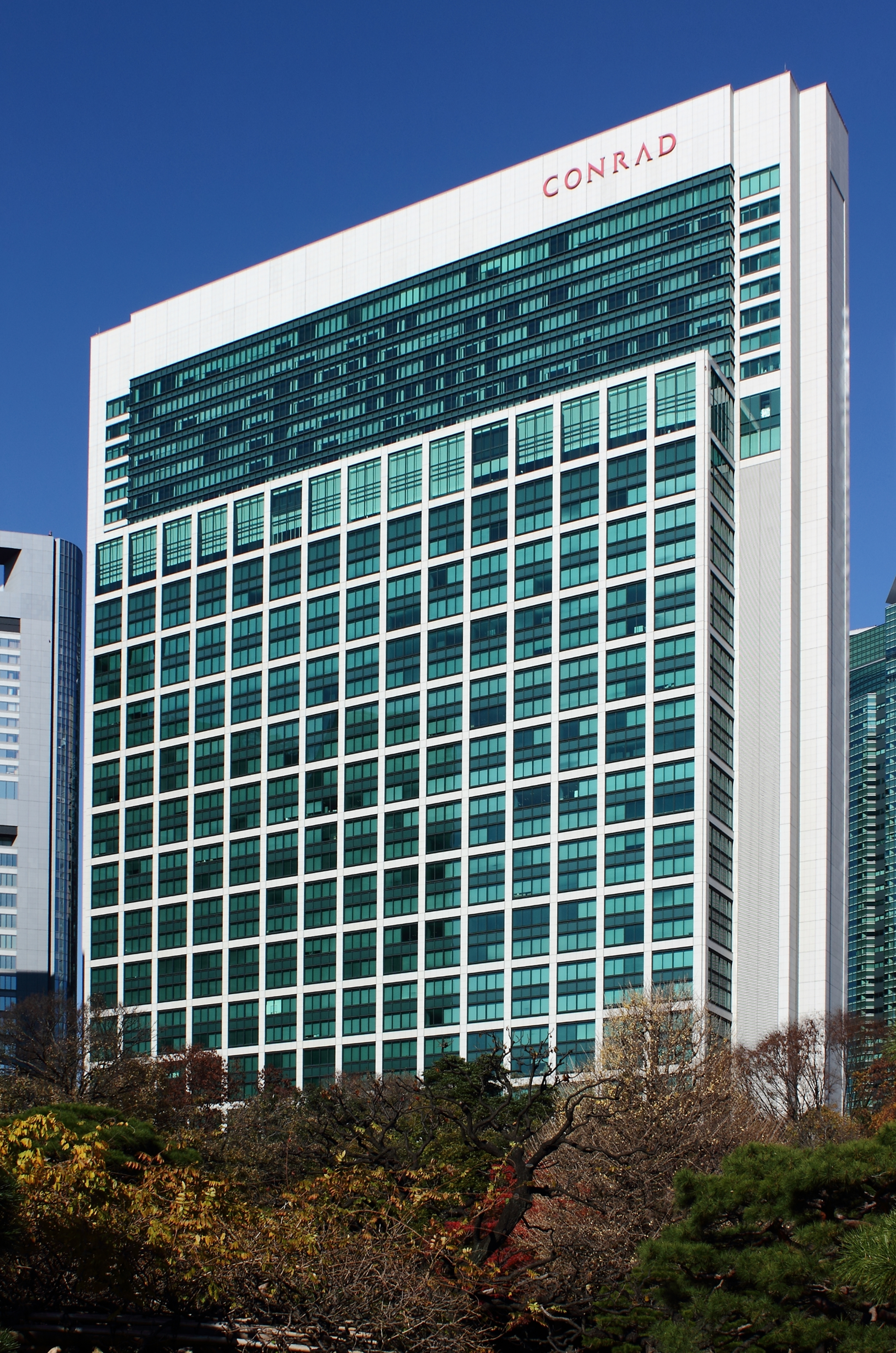
- Headquarters in the Tokyo Shiodome Building located in Minato, Tokyo
- Native name: アコム株式会社
- Romanized name: Akomu Kabushiki gaisha
- Company type: Public
- Traded as: TYO: 8572
- Industry: Financial services
- Founded: 23 October 1978; 47 years ago
- Founder: Masao Kinoshita
- Headquarters: 1-9-1 Higashi-Shinbashi, Minato, Tokyo, Japan
- Key people: Shigeyoshi Kinoshita (Chairman); Naruse Hiroshi (Vice-Chairman; Kinoshita Masataka (President and Chief Executive Officer)
- Products: Consumer finance
- Owner: Mitsubishi Financial Group
- Website: acom.co.jp

Acom (アコム, Akomu; TYO: 8572) is one of Japan's largest consumer loan companies, (or sarakin). The name "Acom" stands for Affection, Confidence and Moderation. The company was founded by Masao Kinoshita, who was later replaced by his eldest son Kyosuke Kinoshita, the current chairman of the company. In addition to providing loans, Acom issues credit cards.

At the end of 2008, Mitsubishi UFJ obtained control of more than 40% of Acom stock and Acom became a consolidated subsidiary of MUFG.

== Ownership ==
As of April 2009, the founders (Maruito/Kinoshita) control about 40% of the shares, another 40% are controlled by MUFG.
