= Hideyuki Busujima =

Japanese businessman

- Born: 1952 or 1953 (age 72–73)
- Occupations: Chairman and CEO, Sankyo
- Parent: Kunio Busujima

Hideyuki Busujima (born 1952/1953) is a Japanese billionaire businessman, and the chairman and CEO of Sankyo, the pachinko machine company founded by his father Kunio Busujima.

Hideyuki Busujima is the son of Kunio Busujima, who died in October 2016. His two sisters also own shares in the company.

Busujima joined Sankyo in April 1977.

He has been the chairman and CEO of Sankyo since 2008.

He lives in Tokyo, Japan.
