= Shinagawa East One Tower =

Building in Tokyo, Japan

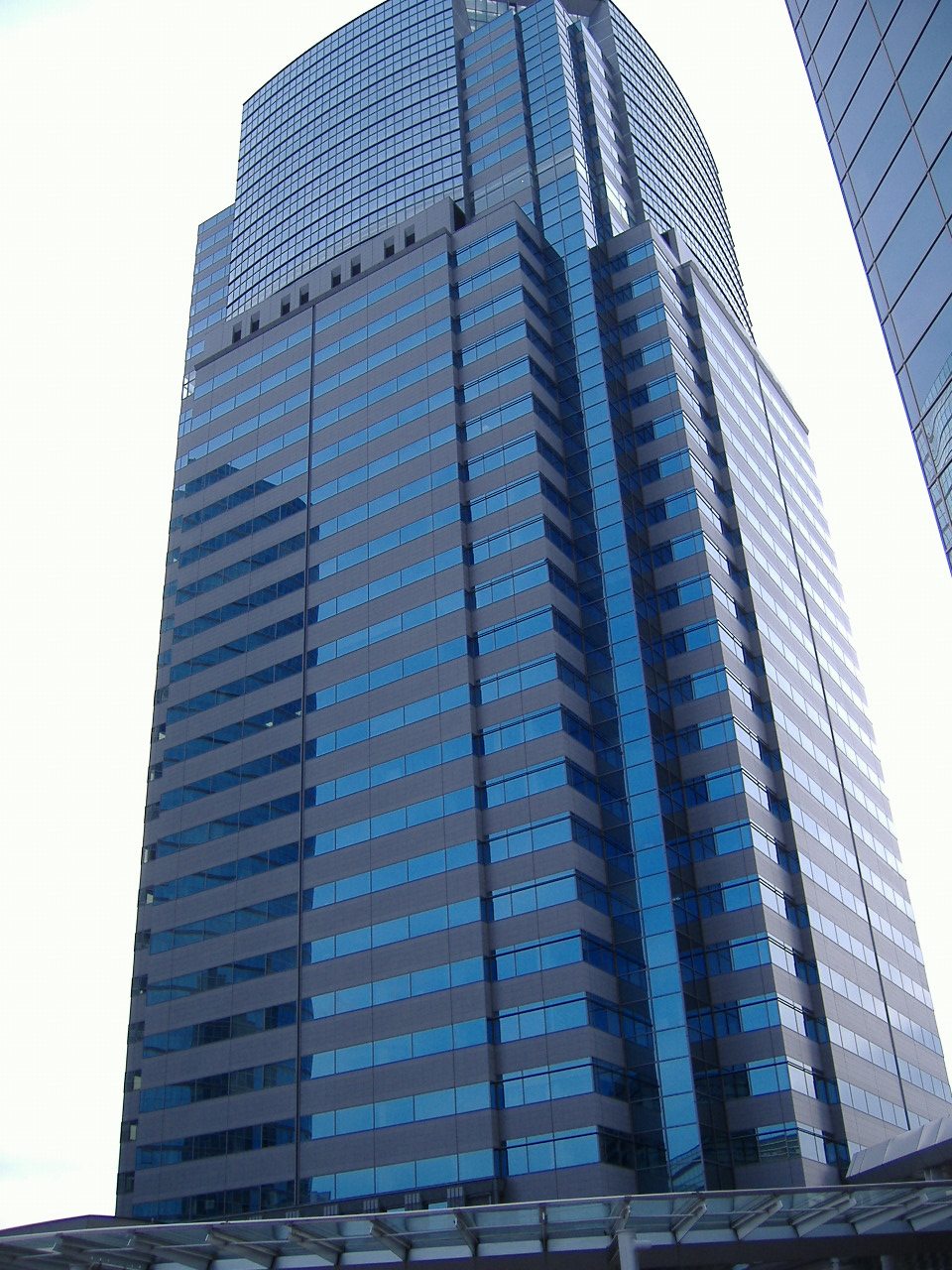

General information
- Location: Tokyo, Japan, 2-16-1, Konan, Minato-ku, Tokyo, Japan
- Coordinates: 35.627764°N 139.740875°E
- Construction started: 2000
- Completed: March 31, 2003
- Owner: Daito Trust Construction Co., Ltd.

Height
- Height: 151.6 m

Technical details
- Structural system: Steel frame structure + steel-reinforced concrete structure
- Floor count: 32 (Three basement floors and 32 above ground floors)
- Floor area: 118,420.62m²
- Lifts/elevators: 32

Design and construction
- Architecture firm: Nikken Sekkei
- Main contractor: Takenaka Corporation

Other information
- Parking: 274 car spaces
- Public transit: Shinagawa Station

Website
- Official website

Shinagawa East One Tower (しながわイーストワンタワー) is a 32-story intelligent building which was built in Konan, which is a redevelopment area of Minato-ku, Tokyo. The construction of the building was started in 2000, and was completed on 31 March 2003.

The main functions of the building are office and retail space for companies, restaurants, retail establishments and clinics. As with many buildings in Japan this one also is equipped with energy absorption style seismic motion mitigation device.

The Shinagawa East One Tower houses the corporate headquarters of its owner, Daito Trust Construction.

== Tenants ==
=== Office tenants ===
- Daito Trust Construction headquarters
- Broadcom Japan headquarters
- Regus offices
- Berlitz language school

=== Clinics ===
- Shinagawa East One Medical Clinic
- Shinagawa East One Skin Clinic
- Shinagawa Bayside Ophthalmology
- East One Dental Clinic

=== Hotel ===
The upper floors of the building are occupied by The Strings by InterContinental Tokyo.

=== Restaurants ===
There are several izakaya type restaurant establishments in the building.
