= Takefuji =

Takefuji logo

Takefuji Corporation (株式会社武富士, Kabushiki-gaisha Takefuji) was a Japanese consumer finance company, or sarakin. On September 28, 2010, it filed a petition for commencement of a corporate re-organisation under the Japanese Corporate Reorganisation Act.

== Services ==
The Group's principal activity is the provision of consumer financial services, namely to the sub prime segment. This market was previously viewed as an area of money lenders and crime related activities. However, through a network of professional outlets, unmanned outlets, internet outlets and cash dispensers and ATMs, Takefuji claimed to revolutionise the market. The operations were carried out through the following divisions: Consumer Financing division deals with unsecured and non-guaranteed loans, internet financing, debt counseling services, credit cards and the Other Operations division which deals with other financing, parking lot operations, golf course operations, venture capital, Karaoke booth operations, re-insurance. As of 31-Mar-2005, the Group consisted of the parent company, five domestic consolidated subsidiaries and five overseas subsidiaries.

== Corporate Rehabilitation of Takefuji ==
In the late 2000s, similar to other major consumer finance companies, Takefuji experienced a significant deterioration in business performance and cash flow due to a surge in claims for overpaid interest. On September 28, 2010, the company filed for protection under the Corporate Reorganization Act with the Tokyo District Court, which accepted the petition. It was estimated that approximately 2 million customers had overpaid interest to the company, with the total overpayment amounting to around ¥2.4 trillion.

It was later discovered that Fuji Credit, which had taken over some of Takefuji’s debts, sent “settlement agreements” to certain former customers. These documents asked customers to give up any right to claim money back—including refunds for overpaid interest—and required their signatures. Many saw this as an attempt to stop people from getting their money back. Japan’s Financial Services Agency and other authorities warned that this might break laws like the Attorney Act or Servicer Act.

Later, South Korea’s A&P Financial, known for its brand "Rush & Cash," announced it would sponsor and acquire the business.

On October 31, 2011, the Tokyo District Court approved the rehabilitation plan. Takefuji planned to split the company and transfer its consumer finance business to A&P’s group company, APRO Co., Ltd., for about 28.2 billion yen. The company also changed its name to TFK Co., Ltd., focusing only on repaying creditors. However, A&P Financial failed to raise the needed funds. So on December 28, 2011, Takefuji signed a new sponsor deal with J Trust Co., Ltd. On March 1, 2012, it transferred its business to J Trust’s subsidiary, Nihon Hosho Co., Ltd. (formerly Lopuro), for 25.2 billion yen.

On the same day, the old company was renamed TFK and focused only on handling lawsuits and repayment. Once all legal matters were completed, TFK was officially dissolved on March 17, 2017.

Nihon Hosho continued to use the Takefuji name for its loans until March 2013. After that, it rebranded its loans as “Nihon Hosho Free Loan” and stopped new consumer lending around 2015. Today, it only offers real estate-secured loans. It is a member of the Japan Credit Information Reference Center (JICC).

== Scandal ==
Once Japan's most profitable consumer finance company, Takefuji's reputation has been tarnished since founder and former chairman Yasuo Takei pleaded guilty in 2004 to charges he ordered illegal wiretaps on journalists. Now he's looking for a buyer for part or all of his family's 50-plus percent share in the company. Tokyo Goldman Sachs Group and Sumitomo Mitsui Financial Group are bidding for a controlling stake. Takefuji makes personal loans at some 530 branches across Japan, charging as much as 29% interest.

== Sports ==
The company also owned Takefuji Bamboo, a professional women's volleyball team.

== See also ==
- Loans in Japan
