= Masahiro Miki =

Japanese businessman (born 1955)

- 三木正浩
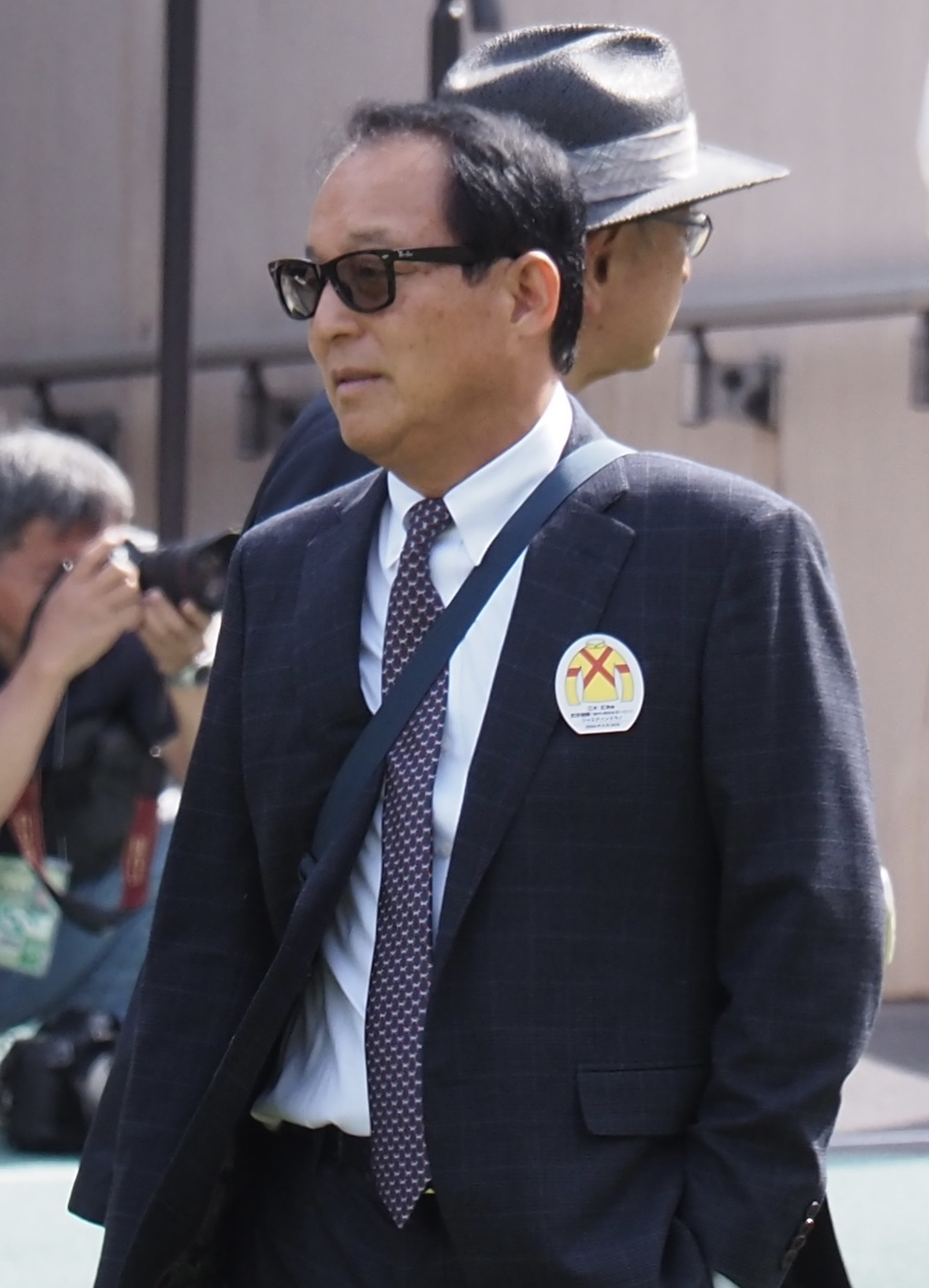
- Miki at the 2024 Japanese Derby
- Born: 26 July 1955 (age 71); Ise, Japan
- Education: Toho Gakuen Tanki University (1976)
- Occupation: Businessman

Masahiro Miki (Japanese: 三木正浩; born 26 July 1955) is a Japanese billionaire businessman, and the founder and largest shareholder of Tokyo-based shoemaker ABC-Mart. Miki is of Korean descent.

In 1985, Miki founded shoe and apparel company Kokusai Boeki Shoji. The company was renamed ABC-Mart in 1990 and went public in 2002. Miki acted as chairman of the company from 2004 to 2007.

As of November 2025, Miki has an estimated net worth of $3.9 billion.

In addition to his business, Miki is also a successful racehorse owner, who owns several notable horses including Justin Milano (2024 Satsuki Shō) and Justin Palace (2024 Spring Tenno Sho).
