= Yasuo Takei =

Japanese businessman (1930–2006)

Yasuo Takei (武井保雄, Takei Yasuo) (January 4, 1930 – August 10, 2006) was the founder and former chairman of Takefuji (武富士), Japan's number one consumer finance group.

On 17 November 2004 he was given a three-year suspended sentence for wiretapping and defamation of character, after ordering the phones of two freelance journalists who had written articles critical of Takefuji to be bugged between December 2000 and February 2001. The defamation of character charge followed Takei's ordering Takefuji employees to place libelous statements about one of the journalists on its web site.

According to a Forbes survey in June 2006, Takei was the second-wealthiest person in Japan (after Masayoshi Son) - he possessed an estimated net worth of US$5.6 billion.

== See also ==
- List of billionaires
