= Han Chang-woo =

Zainichi Korean businessman (born 1931)

- Born: 15 February 1931 (age 95); Shisen, Keishōnan-dō, Korea, Empire of Japan
- Education: Hosei University (BA)
- Occupations: Chairman and CEO, Maruhan
- Children: 7

Korean name
- Hangul: 한창우
- Hanja: 韓昌祐
- RR: Han Changu
- MR: Han Ch'angu

Japanese name (transcription)
- Kanji: 韓昌祐
- Katakana: ハン・チャンウ
Transcriptions
- Revised Hepburn: Han Chan'u

Japanese name (reading)
- Kanji: 韓昌祐
- Hiragana: かん しょうゆう
Transcriptions
- Revised Hepburn: Kan Shōyū

Han Chang-woo (韓 昌祐, born February 15, 1931; read in Japanese as Han Chan'u or rarely Kan Shōyū) is a Korean-born Japanese businessman who is the CEO of the pachinko management company Maruhan (マルハン).

== Early life ==
Han was born in Korea and secretly entered Japan in October 1945. He obtained Special Permanent Resident status and attended Hosei University, graduating with a degree in economics in 1952.

== Career ==
Shortly after graduation, he took over a pachinko operation run by his brother-in-law in Kyoto. He founded Maruhan Corporation in 1972. Han became a Japanese national in 2002.

== Philanthropy ==
He has announced that he intends to give away his entire fortune to foster Korean and Japanese relations before he dies. More recently he has pledged to up his culture fund based in Japan to 140 billion won and an education fund in Korea to 10 billion won.

== Awards ==
- Order of the Sacred Treasure, Third Class — 1999
- Sacheon Citizen Award (사천시민대상) — 2010

== Controversy ==
A lawsuit was filed in September 2020 in the U.S. Territory of Guam, alleging that he had unlawfully taken away $300 million in stock owned by one of his daughters. The Suit also claims that Han Chang-woo's motivation for this action was to force his daughter to divorce her second husband, an African-American businessman and retired professional basketball player.

== See also ==
- Masayoshi Son, another Zainichi Korean businessman
