= Shiyō Shimamura =

Japanese photographer

Shiyō Shimamura (島村紫陽, Shimamura Shiyō; 1903–1974) was a renowned Japanese photographer.
