= Matsui Securities =

Japanese financial company

Matsui Securities Co., Ltd
- Native name: 松井証券株式会社
- Type: Public
- Traded as: TYO: 8628
- Industry: Financial
- Founded: March 20, 1931
- Headquarters: Tokyo, Japan
- Key people: Michio Matsui, President; Kunihiko Sato, Executive Director
- Revenue: ▼¥24,346 million (March 2010)
- Net income: ▲¥7,661 million (March 2010)
- Total assets: ¥74,203 million (as of March 2010)
- Number of employees: 108
- Website: www.matsui.co.jp/ir/en/

Matsui Securities (松井証券, Matsui Shōken) is a Japanese financial company. It is listed on the Nikkei 225.

== History ==
Although the company was incorporated in 1931; 95 years ago, it was a very small company until it changed its business strategy in the mid-1990s to take advantage of online trading and the freedoms afforded by the recent financial company deregulations in Japan. Today its primary business is providing online securities trading services.
