= Kyosuke Kinoshita =

Japanese businessman (born 1941)

Kyosuke Kinoshita (木下 恭輔, Kinoshita Kyōsuke; born 1941) is the chairman of Acom Co., Ltd., a major consumer loan company in Japan. He is the eldest son of Masao Kinoshita, founder of Acom. He graduated from Ritsumeikan University with a bachelor's degree.

== See also ==
- List of billionaires
