= Kunio Busujima =

Japanese businessman (1925–2016)

- Born: 1 April 1925; Japan
- Died: 22 October 2016 (aged 91)
- Occupations: Chairman and founder, Sankyo
- Children: 4, including Hideyuki Busujima

Kunio Busujima (毒島 邦雄, Busujima Kunio; 1 April 1925 – 22 October 2016) was a Japanese billionaire businessman, and the founder and chairman of Sankyo, one of the three major pachinko machine makers in Japan.

According to Forbes in January 2015, he had an estimated net worth of US$4.2 billion. He died in October 2016 at the age of 91.

== See also ==
- List of Japanese by net worth
