= Fukuzo Iwasaki =

Fukuzo Iwasaki (岩崎 福三, Iwasaki Fukuzō; March 11, 1925 – February 29, 2012) was a Japanese real estate magnate with an estimated fortune of $5.7 billion, putting him among the five richest people in Japan. He was chairman of the Iwasaki Sangyo Group, a major transportation, tourism and hotel company in southern Japan, founded by his father, Yōhachirō Iwasaki. Forbes' 2007 list of billionaires estimates his net worth at $2.1 billion.

Iwasaki was a resident of Kagoshima and held a bachelor's degree from Rikkyo University.
