= Masatoshi Ito =

Japanese businessman (1924–2023)

Masatoshi Itō
- Born: 30 April 1924; Tokyo, Japan
- Died: 10 March 2023 (aged 98)
- Occupation: Businessman
- Known for: Owner, founder, and honorary chairman of Ito-Yokado
- Children: 3

Masatoshi Itō (伊藤 雅俊, Itō Masatoshi; 30 April 1924 – 10 March 2023) was a Japanese businessman and founder of Ito-Yokado.

== Early life and career ==
Itō was born in Tokyo on 30 April 1924. His parents, Senzo and Yuki Itō, operated a dry goods shop named Yokado. After finishing high school, Itō had a short stint in the Japanese military and working at what would become Mitsubishi Materials before returning to work at his parents' shop. Following the death of his brother in 1956, Itō took over Yokado, which was then a clothing shop. He soon renamed the company Ito-Yokado.

Itō was the owner, founder and honorary chairman of the $30 billion (in sales) Ito-Yokado retailing group, the second largest retailing organization in the world, which includes more than 10,000 7-Elevens in Japan and the US. Itō built the company from a small apparel store in Tokyo, into a corporation with annual revenues of more than $28 billion and a labour force of more than 125,000. The Ito-Yokado Group includes more than 10,000 7-Eleven stores in Japan and 5,800 in North America, along with 1,000 other stores, department stores, restaurants, specialty shops, supermarkets and superstores. Ito-Yokado was also the Japanese franchisee for Oshman's Sporting Goods stores, Robinson department stores, and Denny's restaurants. The company has begun opening superstores in China.

In 1992, Itō resigned as president of Ito-Yokado following allegations his staff made payments to the yakuza. Itō denied knowledge of the payments, though some of the money came from his wife's bank account, but nonetheless took responsibility for the payments.

== Peter F. Drucker and Masatoshi Ito Graduate School of Management ==
Itō was a significant supporter of the Peter F. Drucker and Masatoshi Ito Graduate School of Management, with an initial $3 million gift to help build the school's current home and a subsequent $20 million gift. His son, Junro, earned his MBA at the Drucker School in 1989 and was active in the Drucker alumni association in Japan.

== Personal life and death ==
Itō was married and had three children. He died on 10 March 2023, at the age of 98.
