= Takemitsu Takizaki =

Japanese billionaire businessman

- Born: 10 June 1945 (age 80)
- Education: Amagasaki Industry High School
- Occupations: Honorary chairman, Keyence
- Spouse: Married
- Children: Takeshi Takizaki

Takemitsu Takizaki (born 10 June 1945) is a Japanese billionaire businessman, honorary chairman and founder of Keyence, a Japanese manufacturer of automation sensors, vision systems, barcode readers, laser markers, measuring instruments, and digital microscopes. As of September 29, 2022, Takizaki has a net worth of US$18.6 billion.

== Early life ==
Takemitsu Takizaki was born on 10 June 1945. He was educated at Amagasaki Industry High School.

== Career ==
Takizaki founded Keyence in 1974 and stepped down as chairman in 2015, remaining on the board of directors and as an honorary chairman.

== Personal life ==
Takizaki is married, with one child, a son, Takeshi Takizaki, and lives in Osaka, Japan. He is a keen fossil collector.
