= Keyence =

Japanese electronics manufacturer

Keyence Corporation

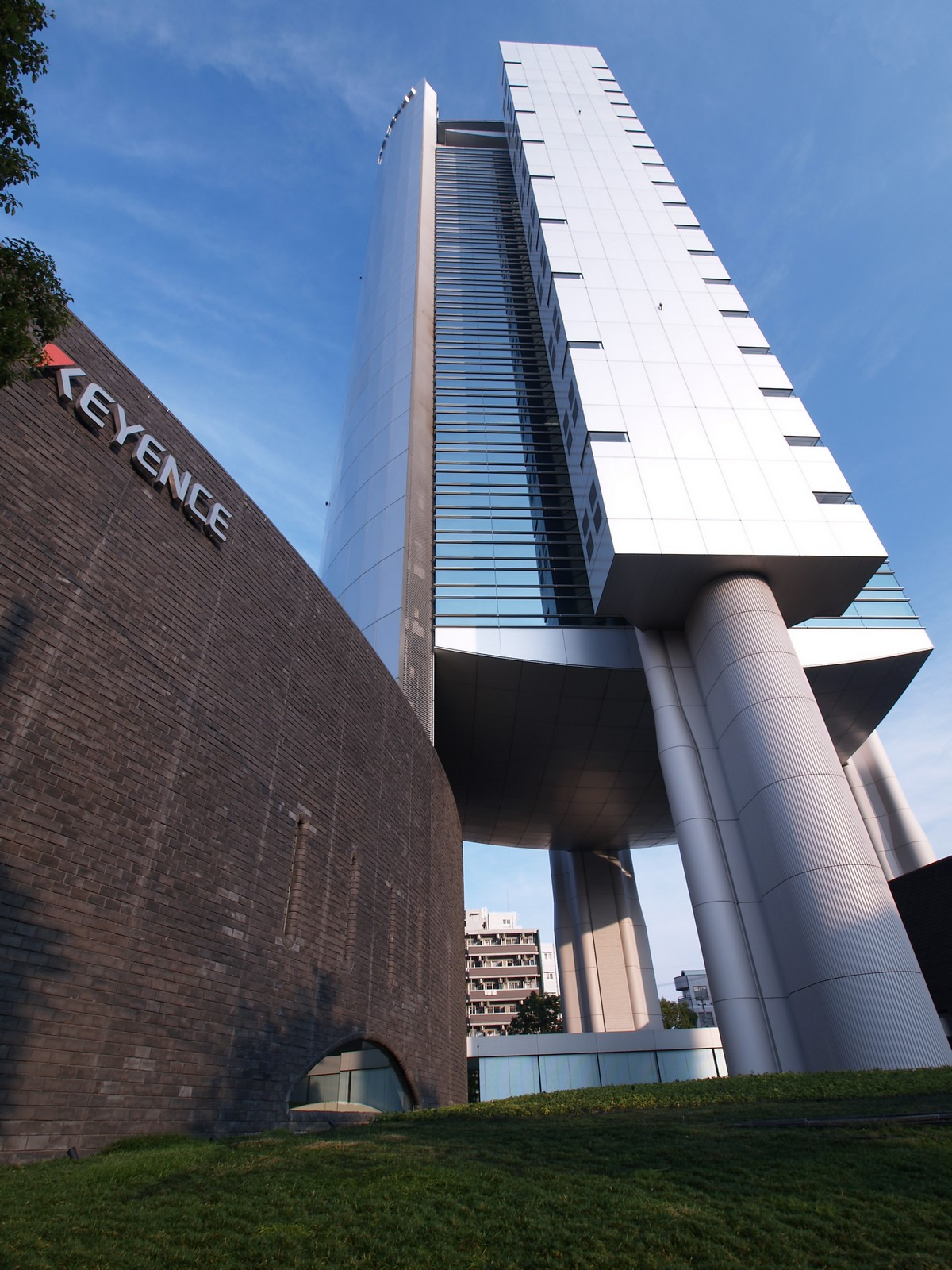
- Keyence Headquarters and Lab in Osaka, Japan
- Native name: 株式会社キーエンス
- Company type: Public (K.K)
- Traded as: TYO: 6861; TOPIX Large 70 Component; Nikkei 225 component (TYO)
- Industry: Electronics
- Founded: 27 May 1974; 52 years ago
- Headquarters: Osaka, Japan
- Key people: Takemitsu Takizaki; (Founder & Honorary Chairman); Yu Nakata; (President)
- Products: FA sensors, measurement systems, machine vision, barcode readers, laser markers, and digital microscopes
- Revenue: US$7.088 billion (2025)
- Operating income: US$3.679 billion (2025)
- Net income: US$2.667 billion (2025)
- Number of employees: 8,380 (2020)
- Website: Official website

Keyence Corporation (キーエンス, Kīensu) is a Japan-based direct sales organization that develops and manufactures equipment for factory automation, sensors, measuring instruments, vision systems, barcode readers, laser markers and digital microscopes.

Keyence is fabless — although it is a manufacturer; it specializes solely in product planning and development and does not manufacture the final products. Keyence products are manufactured at qualified contract manufacturing companies.

== Operations ==
Keyence Corporation is a global company with a network of 16 international organizations that specializes in factory automation. Keyence Corporation earns over US$4.9 billion in yearly sales and employs more than 8,300 employees worldwide. As a direct sales company, Keyence salespeople visit customers on site with demonstration cases to show products live.

Keyence's range of products are part of the manufacturing and research processes in a variety of industries, including the electronics, semiconductor, automotive, food and packaging, biotechnology, and pharmaceutical industries.

== Products ==
Keyence is a fabless manufacturing company that sells a broad range of products, from the photoelectric sensor and proximity sensors to measuring instruments for inspection lines to high precision microscopes used in research institutes. These products are used by more than 300,000 customers globally. Products are shipped from Keyence's warehouses in Japan, the U.S., the U.K., Canada, Germany, Italy, France, Thailand, Malaysia, Singapore, and South Korea, or from 148 agents in 31 countries.

== Company culture and reputation ==
Keyence Japan is consistently listed in the Nihon Keizai Shimbun's yearly ranking of the "Top Ten Most Excellent Companies in Japan." The company maintains a strong ROE (12.32%) and a conservative equity ratio (95.54%), and it is also known as one of the top companies in Japan in terms of salaries; the average annual salary for full-time employees (average age: 35.8 years old) in FY2022 being ¥21,820,000 (US$198,815). A 350-million-year-old ammonite fossil is displayed at the entrance of the Japanese headquarters; other fossils of long-dead creatures line the corridors and meeting rooms. Relics are supposed to convey the company's culture: Develop new products regularly, or go out of business.

=== Outstanding Structure Award — 2000 ===
In 2000 the headquarters building was awarded the Outstanding Structure Award by the International Association for Bridge and Structural Engineering in recognition of the most remarkable, innovative, creative or otherwise stimulating structure.

== Controversies ==
=== Sexual assault case involving employees ===
In August 2024, four then-employees of Keyence were indicted by the Sendai District Public Prosecutors Office on charges of non-consensual sexual intercourse under Japanese criminal law, in connection with an alleged group sexual assault on a woman at a guesthouse in Tokyo. In October 2025, two additional Keyence employees were reported to have been further indicted on the same charge in relation to the case.
