= Takamatsu (surname) =

Takamatsu (written: 高松) is a Japanese surname. Notable people with the surname include:

- Prince Takamatsu (1905–1987), Japanese prince
- Princess Takamatsu (1911–2004), Japanese princess, the wife of Prince Takamatsu
- Daiki Takamatsu (born 1981), Japanese football player
- Jiro Takamatsu (1936–1998), Japanese artist
- Kinnosuke Takamatsu (1898–1979), Japanese actor
- Masahiro Takamatsu (born 1982), Japanese judo player
- Satoshi Takamatsu (born 1963), Japanese advertisement entrepreneur
- Shin Takamatsu (born 1948), Japanese architect
- Shinji Takamatsu (born 1961), Japanese animator and screenwriter
- Yoshiko Takamatsu (高松 好子; born 1938), Japanese swimmer
