= Eitaro Itoyama =

Japanese politician

- 糸山 英太郎

Member of the House of Representatives
- In office 18 July 1993 – 27 September 1996
- Preceded by: Taneaki Tanami
- Succeeded by: Constituency abolished
- Constituency: Saitama 3rd
- In office 18 December 1983 – 24 January 1990
- Preceded by: Seijuro Arafune
- Succeeded by: Toshio Masuda
- Constituency: Saitama 3rd

Member of the House of Councillors
- In office 7 July 1974 – 7 July 1980
- Constituency: National district

Personal details
- Born: 4 June 1942 (age 84) Tokyo, Japan
- Party: Liberal Democratic
- Education: Nihon University; Kindai University

Eitaro Itoyama (糸山 英太郎, Itoyama Eitarō; born 4 June 1942 in Tokyo, Japan) is one of Japan's wealthiest citizens with a fortune estimated to exceed $500 million. He is a controversial figure in Japanese political and commercial life.

Itoyama has served four terms as a member of the Diet, the Japanese Parliament with nearly twenty years of active involvement in the ruling party, the Liberal Democratic Party. He was a principal figure in a 1974 bribery scandal that resulted in the arrests of more than 90 people, including a senior vice president of Itoyama's company, and Peter Herzog characterized Itoyama as "one of the worst offenders" in having a "cavalier attitude" toward Japanese election laws.

In 1989, he was ranked 10th on Forbes' list of the world's richest billionaires, but had fallen off by 1991.

Itoyama became the single largest shareholder in Japan Airlines in February 1998 and publicly called for significant changes to management and business structures. He traveled to the United States and began negotiating the sale of JAL hotel properties such as the Ihilani Resort & Spa in Honolulu and the Essex House in New York, despite having no actual authority to do so. JAL management moved to compromise with Itoyama by appointing him Special Adviser to the Chief Executive Officer in exchange for Itoyama's giving up the right to object to management decisions at shareholder meetings. He sold half of his JAL stake on the open market in 2006 after the company failed to pay dividends for two years in a row.

He is a best-selling author, with books on political and business subjects, and is the chairman and benefactor of an eponymous educational institution.

House of Representatives (Japan)
Preceded by Toshio Yamaguchi	Chair, Foreign Affairs Committee of the House of Representatives of Japan; 1987–1988	Succeeded by Takeshi Hamano
Honorary titles
Preceded by Juro Saito	Youngest member of the House of Councillors of Japan; 1974–1980	Succeeded by Chinatsu Nakayama
