= Ryoichi Jinnai =

Japanese businessman

Ryoichi Jinnai (神内 良一, Jinnai Ryōichi; August 15, 1926 – June 27, 2017) was the founder of Promise, Japan's third-largest consumer finance company, of which he is honorary chairman.

He funded the Ryoichi Jinnai Conference Center in Fiji.

Jinnai died of heart failure on June 27, 2017.
