= Nobuyoshi Fujisawa =

Japanese businessman

Nobuyoshi Fujisawa (藤澤 信義, Fujisawa Nobuyoshi, born January 17, 1970) is from Gifu Prefecture, Japan and Representative Director, President & Chief Executive Officer of J Trust Group which runs banking business, credit guarantee business and financial business in Asian countries.
