= Mori Trust =

Japanese real estate developer

Mori Trust Co., Ltd.
- Native name: 森トラスト株式会社
- Romanized name: Mori Torasuto kabushiki gaisha
- Company type: Private (Kabushiki gaisha)
- Industry: Real estate development
- Predecessor: Mori Building Development Co., Ltd. (1970 - 1999)
- Founded: 10 June 1970
- Headquarters: Toranomon, Minato, Tokyo, Japan
- Area served: Japan
- Key people: Akira Mori ( Chairman of the Board); Miwako Date (President & CEO)
- Services: Real estate development, Office leasing
- Revenue: ¥92.1 billion (FY 2013)
- Operating income: ¥25.3 billion (FY 2013)
- Net income: ¥19.3 billion (FY 2013)
- Website: mori-trust.co.jp

The Mori Trust Co., Ltd. (森トラスト株式会社, Mori Torasuto kabushiki gaisha) is a Japanese real estate developer.

== History ==
Mori Trust was founded in 1970 as Mori Building Development, a subsidiary of the Mori Building group founded by Taikichiro Mori. Following his death in 1993, his two sons Minoru Mori and Akira Mori disagreed as to how to continue the business, with Minoru wishing to continue the company's focus on existing properties and new large-scale urban projects, and Akira wishing to expand the company's portfolio into more small-scale office and leisure properties. This led to a split of the Mori Building group, with Akira Mori taking over the Mori Building Development entity and renaming it "Mori Trust" in 1999. Mori Trust properties that predated the 1999 schism were originally named "Hills" or "Mori Building" but were renamed to "Trust Tower" or "MT Building" around 2002. Mori Building, which spent years planning and completing the Roppongi Hills complex in central Tokyo, focuses on multibillion-dollar complexes; Mori Trust sticks to single or twin structures.

Mori Trust announced in December 2015 that it would begin investing in the United States, starting with the $658 million acquisition of two office buildings in Boston from Liberty Mutual. The company was also reportedly examining potential investments in New York, Washington and other East Coast cities, with a total budget of 100 to 200 billion yen. As of 2024 Mori Trust owns commercial properties in Boston, New York, Washington, and Northern Virginia.

Akira Mori has selected his only daughter Miwako Date, who served as president of Mori Trust Hotels & Resorts, to take over the Mori Trust business, which she did in 2016. Akira Mori is now assuming the role of Chairman of the Board of Mori Trust.

== Major office properties ==
=== Japan ===
==== Tokyo ====
- Tokyo Shiodome Building
- Marunouchi Trust City
- Akasaka Twin Tower
- Gotenyama Garden
- Shiroyama Trust Tower

==== Sendai ====
- Sendai Trust Tower

=== United States ===
- 245 Park Avenue, New York
- 10 St. James Avenue/75 Arlington Street, Boston
- 15 Necco Street, Boston
- 601 Massachusetts Avenue, Washington
- 2235 and 2245 Monroe Street, Herndon
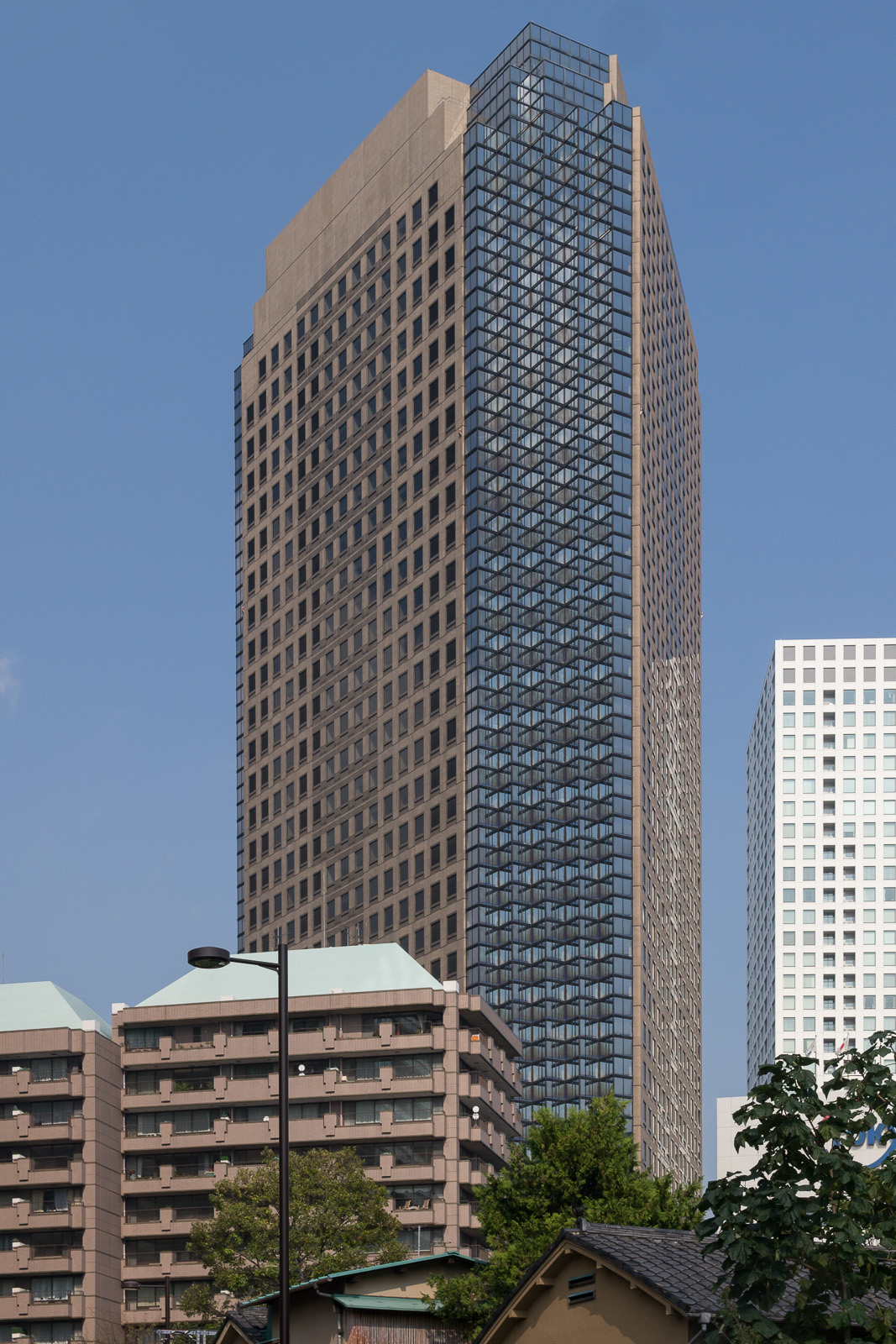
Shiroyama Trust Tower (Minato, Tokyo)

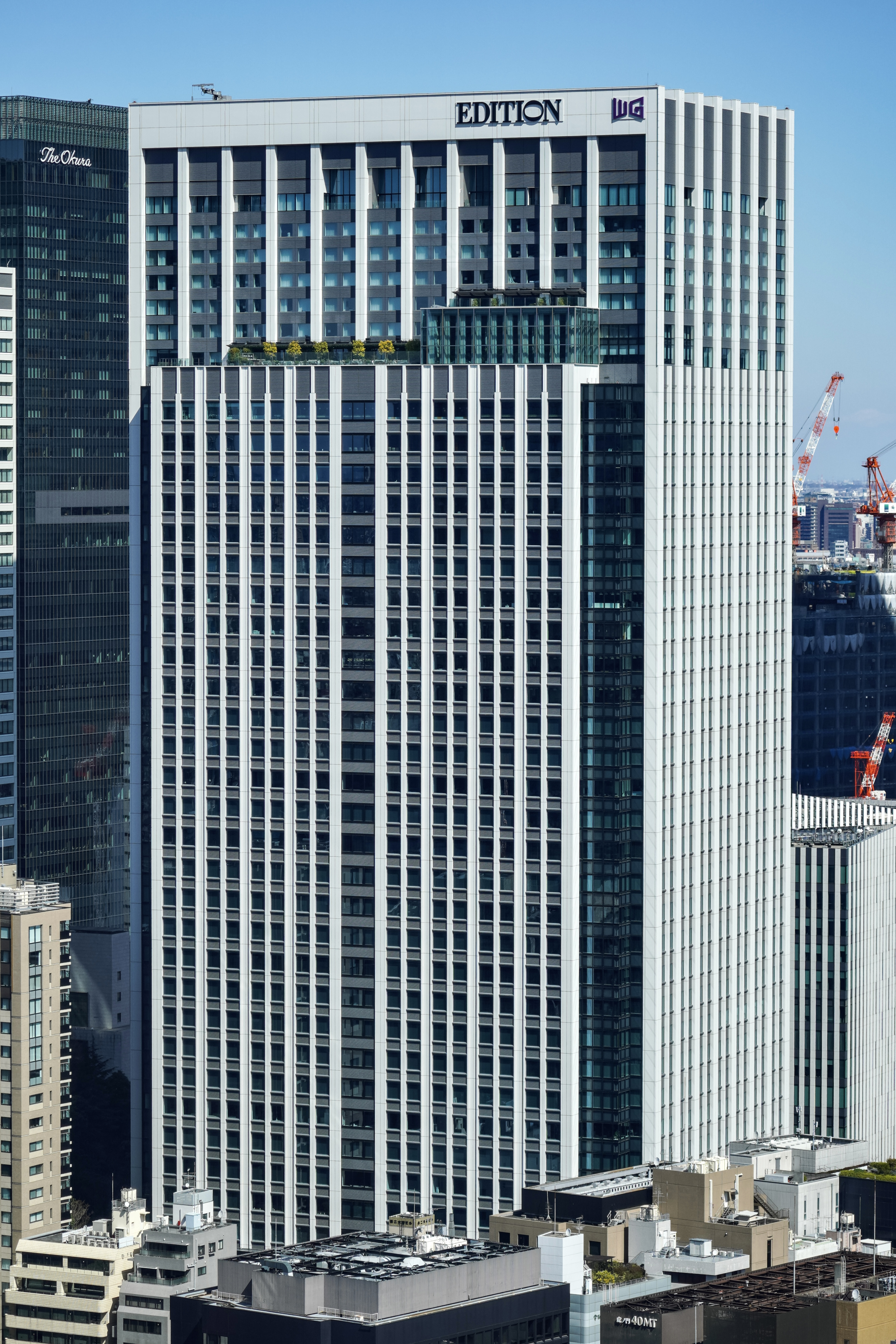
Kamiyacho Trust Tower (Tokyo World Gate) (Minato, Tokyo)

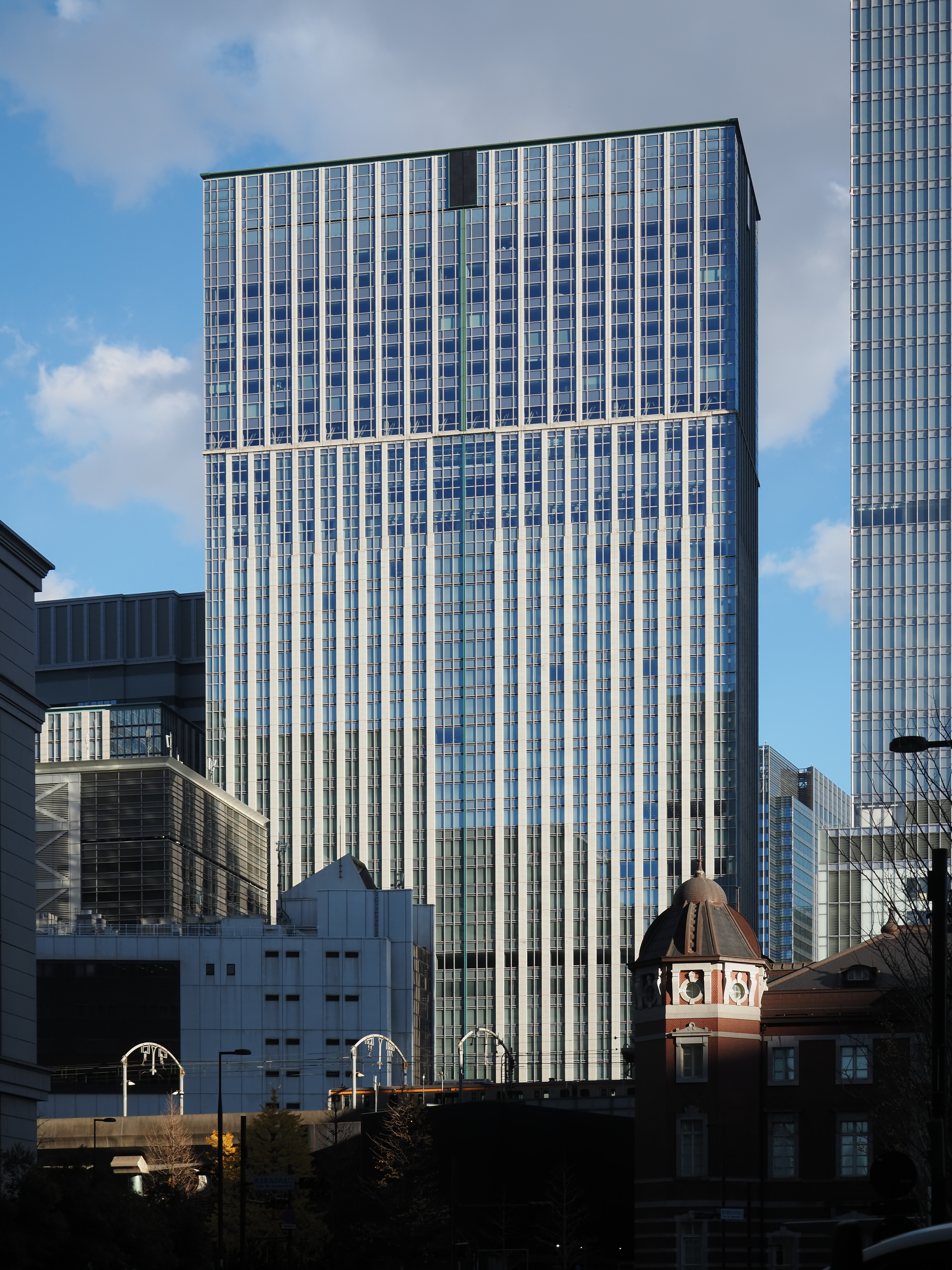
Marunouchi Trust City (Chiyoda, Tokyo)

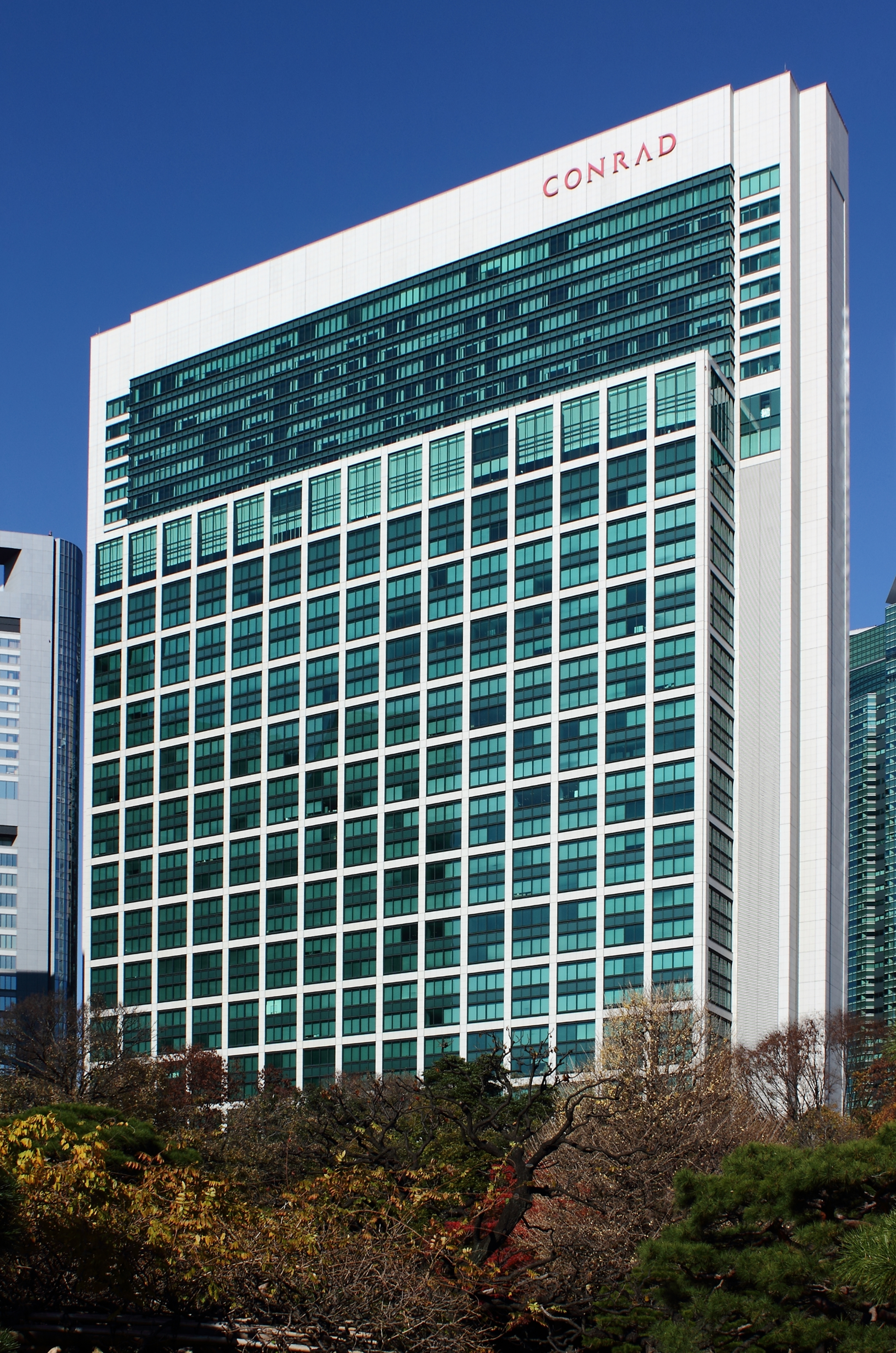
Tokyo Shiodome Building (Minato, Tokyo)

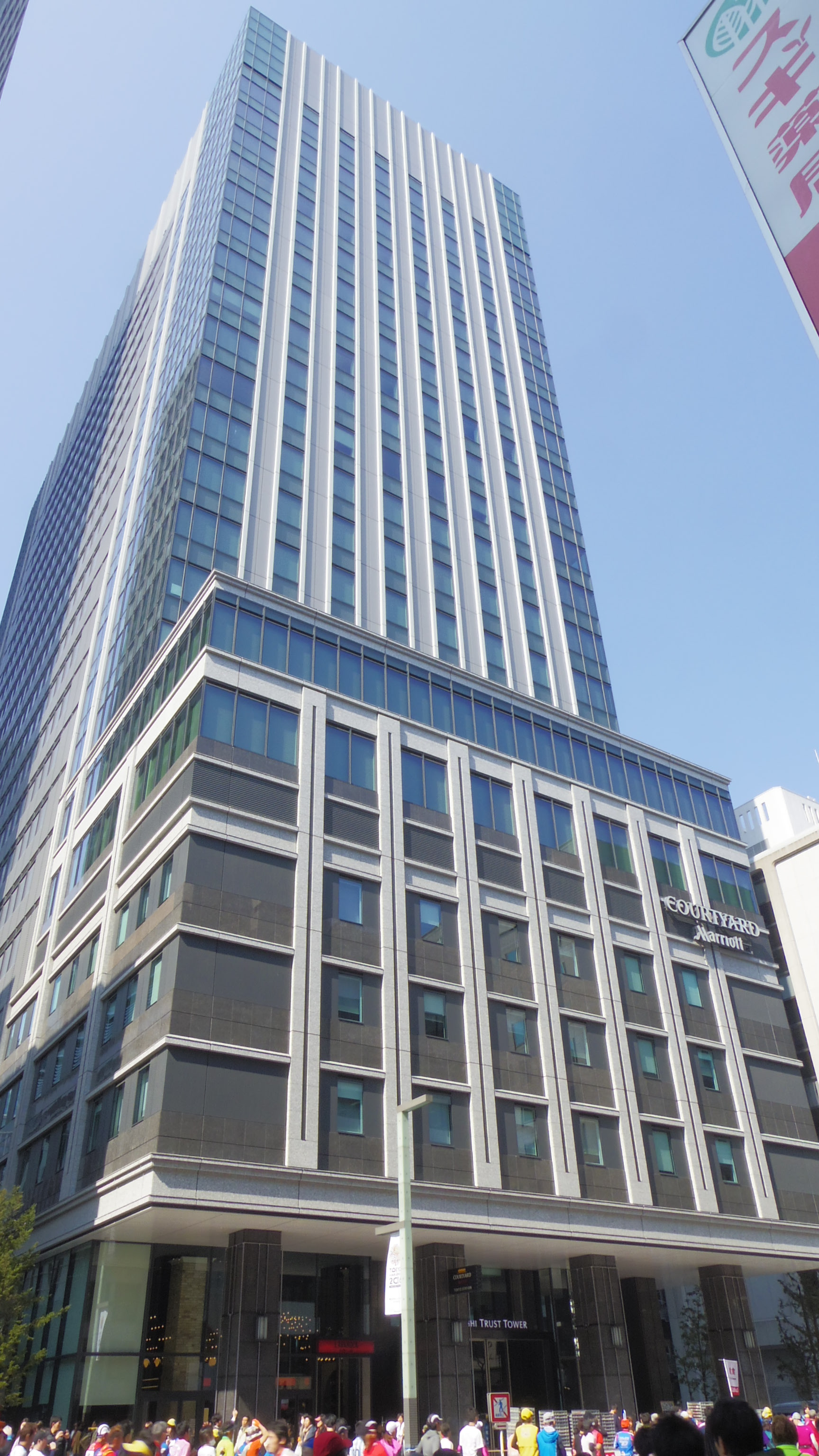
Kyobashi Trust Tower (Chuo, Tokyo)

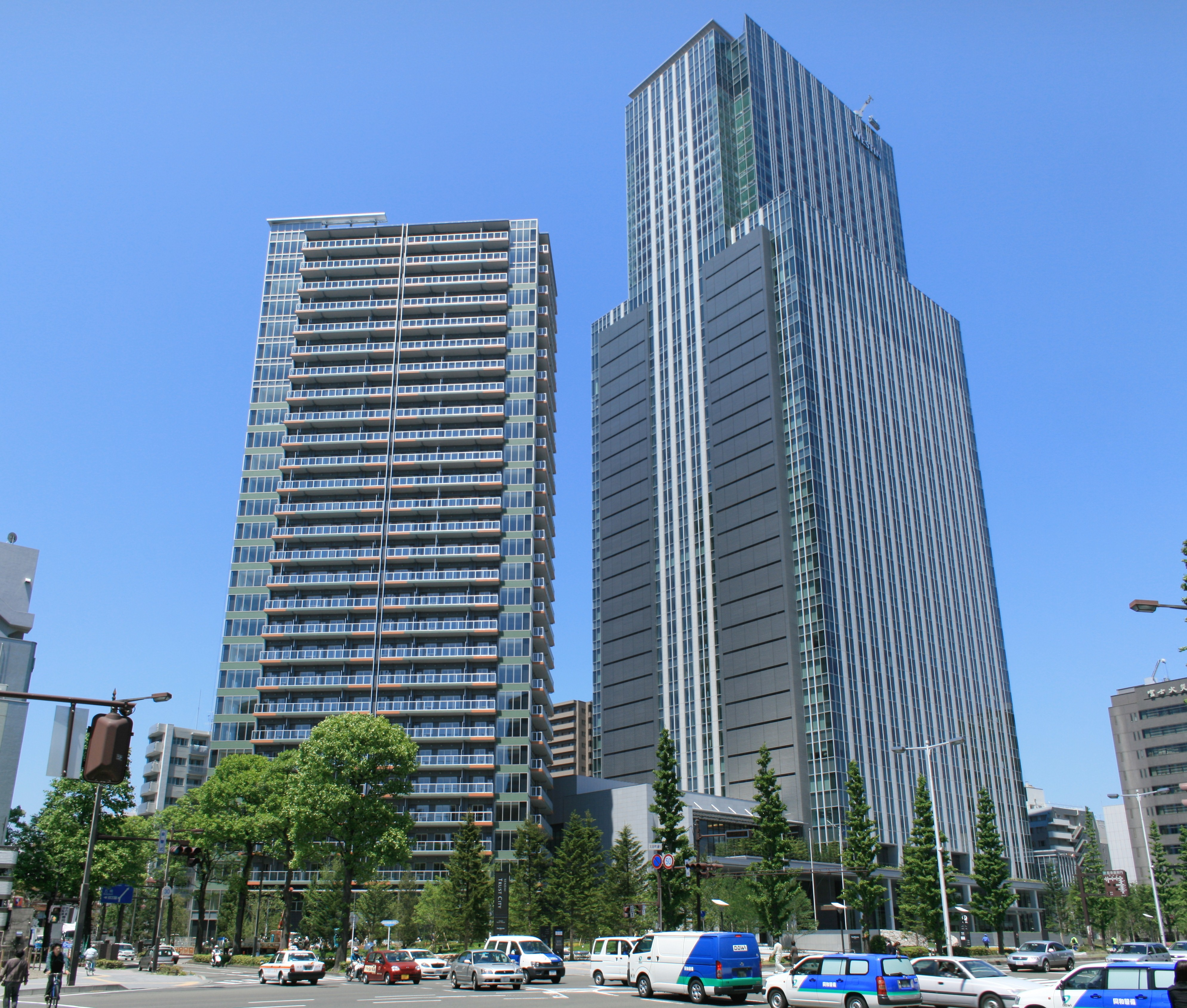
Sendai Trust City (Sendai, Miyagi)

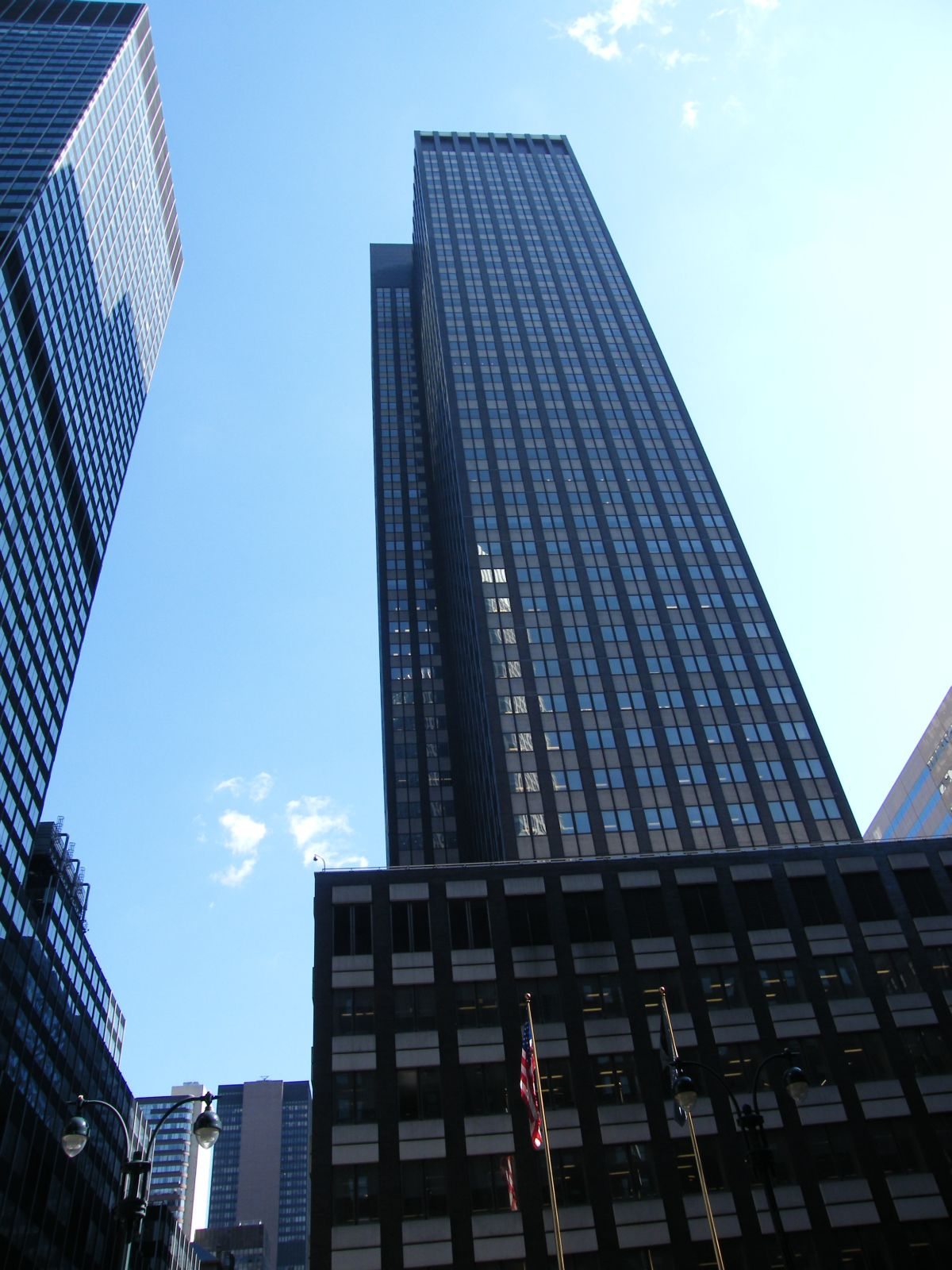
245 Park Avenue (New York)

== Major hotel properties ==
- Laforet Hotels chain
- Rihga Royal Hotels chain (minority partner)
- Conrad Tokyo
- Courtyard by Marriott Tokyo Station
- Westin Sendai
- InterContinental Yokohama Grand
- Shangri-La Tokyo
- Sunroute Plaza Shinjuku
- Iraph Sui
- Suiran
