= Akira Mori =

Japanese property developer

- 森 章
- Born: July 1936 (age 90); Kyoto, Japan
- Education: Keio University
- Occupation: property developer
- Known for: Chairman, Mori Trust
- Children: 3, including Miwako Date
- Parent: Taikichiro Mori
- Relatives: Minoru Mori (brother)

Akira Mori (森 章, Mori Akira; born July 1936) is a Japanese property developer, and the chairman of Mori Trust, a real estate developer in Tokyo, Japan and an offshoot of Mori Building, the company his father Taikichiro Mori founded in 1959. As of July 2022, his net worth was estimated at US$3.0 billion.

Mori was born in Kyoto, Japan in July 1936. He attended Keio University, graduating in 1960, and joining Yasuda Trust & Banking (now part of Mizuho Trust & Banking). He formally joined Mori Building as an employee in 1972.

Following their father's death in 1993, he and his older brother Minoru Mori inherited the family business and in 1999 they split it after a falling-out. Akira headed Mori Trust, while his brother headed what was left of the Mori Building company until his death on March 8, 2012. Mori Trust owns and operates 67 buildings, manages 89 buildings, consisting of office and residential buildings, mainly in central Tokyo and other major Japanese cities. These include the Tokyo Shiodome Building in a commercial district near Tokyo Bay, and about 30 hotels including the Conrad Tokyo. He expressed interest in expanding the company's Tokyo real estate portfolio in 2013 in the midst of economic reforms being enacted by Prime Minister Shinzo Abe.

Mori has selected his only daughter Miwako Date, who served as president of Mori Trust Hotels & Resorts, in 2016 to take over the Mori Trust business. Akira Mori is now assuming the role of Chairman of the Board of Mori Trust.
