= Miwako Date =

Japanese businesswoman (born 1971)

- Born: Miwako Mori; May 7, 1971; Tokyo, Japan
- Education: Sacred Heart School in Tokyo; Keio University
- Known for: President & CEO, Mori Trust (2016–)
- Children: 1
- Parent: Akira Mori
- Relatives: Taikichiro Mori (grandparent); Minoru Mori (uncle)

Miwako Date (伊達 美和子, born 7 May 1971) is a Japanese businesswoman, and the president and CEO of Mori Trust.

== Early life and education ==
Miwako Date is the daughter of Akira Mori. She has two brothers. She went to the private Sacred Heart School in Tokyo. She graduated in media and governance from Keio University, Tokyo. After her graduation, she started working at a Japanese consulting firm.

== Career ==
In 1998, Date decided to join the family business and started working at Mori Trust. She became executive managing director of Mori Trust in 2008. She was the president of the Mori Trust Hotels & Resorts Co, and the chairman of Mampei Hotel, Karuizawa. In 2016, she became president & CEO of the Mori Trust, with her father Akira Mori assuming the role of chairman.

Since she took over the role of CEO, Date has pursued a strategy of globalization as part of the Mori Trust's mid to long-term vision, called Advance 2027, in order to reduce the trust's dependency on the Japanese real-estate market, which accounts for more than 90% of the business. Recent real estate acquisitions in Boston, Silicon Valley and Washington, D.C., US, are a reflection of this strategy.

Date is a member of the tourism subcommittee for an advisory panel on transportation policy at the Ministry of Land, Infrastructure, Transport and Tourism (MLIT), a commissioner of the Tokyo Building Owners and Managers Association, a commissioner of the Japan Hotel Association, and a trustee of the Japan Association of Corporate Executives.

=== Awards ===
Date received a Bvlgari Avrora Award in 2017.

In December 2017, Date was awarded a Veuve Clicquot Business Woman Award in Tokyo.
