= Shanghai World Financial Center =

Supertall skyscraper in Shanghai, China

Coordinates: 31°14′12″N 121°30′10″E

- 上海环球金融中心
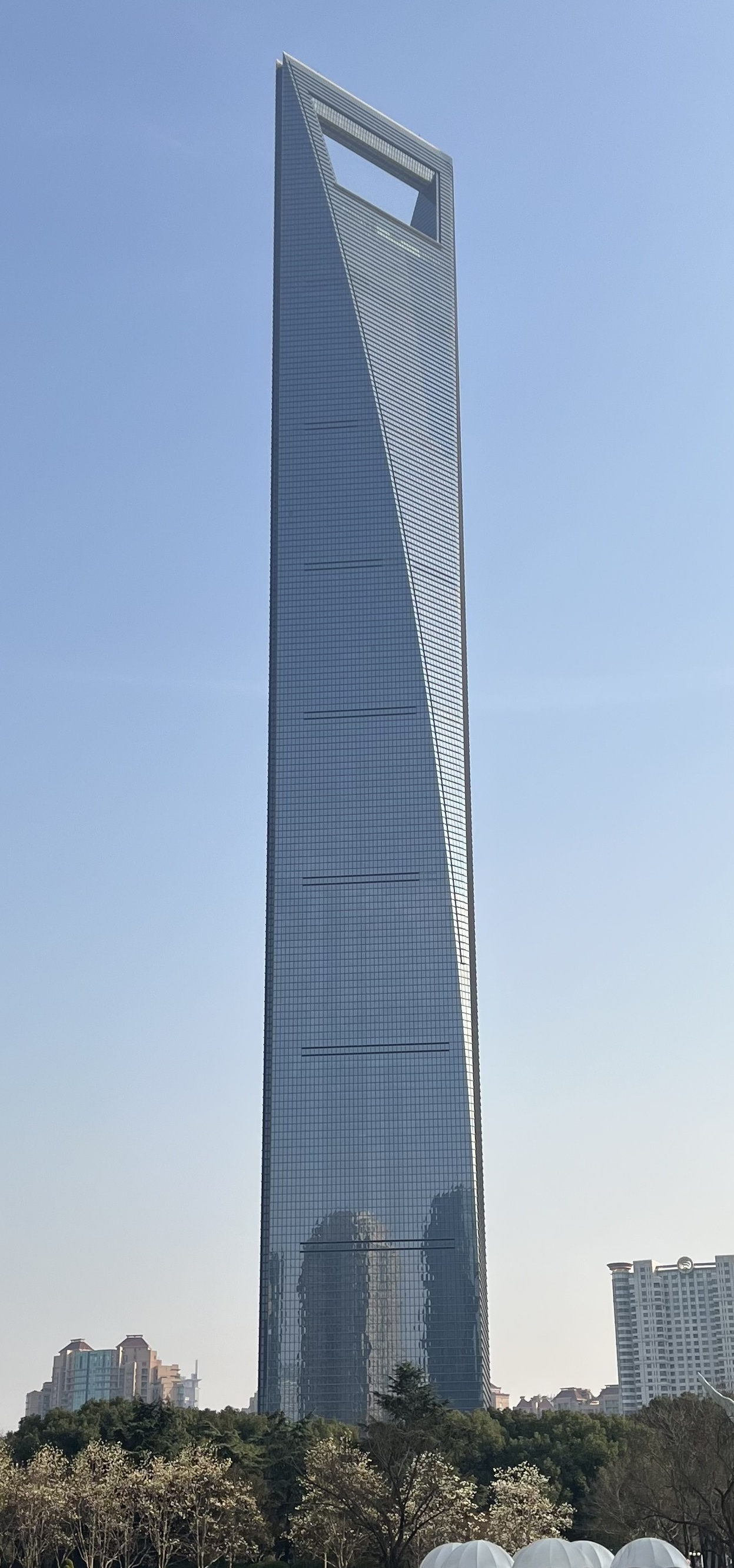
- Shanghai World Financial Center in March 2024

General information
- Status: Completed
- Type: Office, hotel, museum, observation, parking garage, retail
- Architectural style: Neo-Futurism
- Location: 100 Century Avenue, Pudong, Shanghai
- Construction started: 27 August 1997; 29 years ago
- Completed: 2008; 18 years ago
- Opening: 28 August 2008
- Cost: RMB ¥ 8.17 billion (US$ 1.20 billion)
- Owner: Shanghai World Financial Center Co., Ltd. (Mori Building Company)

Height
- Architectural: 492 m (1,614.2 ft)
- Tip: 494.3 m (1,621.7 ft)
- Roof: 487.4 m (1,599.1 ft)
- Top floor: 474 m (1,555.1 ft)
- Observatory: 474 m (1,555.1 ft)

Technical details
- Floor count: 101 (3 below ground)
- Floor area: 381,600 m^{2} (4,107,500 sq ft)
- Lifts/elevators: 91 + 33 escalators

Design and construction
- Architect: Kohn Pedersen Fox
- Developer: Mori Building Co.
- Structural engineer: Leslie E. Robertson Associates RLLP
- Main contractor: China State Construction Engineering Corporation and Shanghai Construction (Group) General Co.

Other information
- Public transit: Lujiazui station

Website
- swfc-shanghai.com

The Shanghai World Financial Center (SWFC; Chinese: 上海环球金融中心; pinyin: Shànghǎi Huánqiú Jīnróng Zhōngxīn, Shanghainese: Zånhae Guejieu Cinyon Tsonsin) is a supertall skyscraper located in the Pudong district of Shanghai. It was designed by Kohn Pedersen Fox and developed by the Mori Building Company, with Leslie E. Robertson Associates as its structural engineer and China State Construction Engineering Corporation and Shanghai Construction (Group) General Co. as its main contractor. It is a mixed-use skyscraper, consisting of offices, hotels, conference rooms, and a ground-floor shopping mall.

On 14 September 2007, the skyscraper was topped out at 492 meters (1,614.2 ft), making it the 2nd tallest building in the world on completion (the tallest at the time being Taipei 101), the tallest building in the world by roof height only, and the tallest in mainland China. The SWFC opened to the public on 28 August 2008, with its (since closed) observation deck opening on 30 August. The observation deck offered views from 474 m (1,555 ft) above ground level.

Park Hyatt Shanghai is the tower's hotel component, comprising 174 rooms and suites occupying the 79th to the 93rd floors, which at the time of completion was the highest hotel in the world. It is now the third-highest hotel in the world after the Ritz-Carlton, Hong Kong, which occupies floors 102 to 118 of the International Commerce Centre.

The SWFC has been lauded for its design, and in 2008 it was named by architects as the year's best-completed skyscraper. In 2013, the SWFC was exceeded in height by the adjacent Shanghai Tower, which is China's tallest structure as of 2023. Together, The Shanghai World Financial Center, The Shanghai Tower and The Jin Mao Tower form the world's first adjacent grouping of three supertall skyscrapers.

== History ==
Designed by American architectural firm Kohn Pedersen Fox, the 100-story tower was originally planned for construction in 1997, but work was temporarily interrupted by the 1997 Asian financial crisis, and was later paused to accommodate design changes by the Mori Building Company. The building of the tower was financed by several multinational firms, including Chinese, Japanese, and Hong Kong banks, as well as by the Japanese developer and American and European investors. The American investment bank Morgan Stanley coordinated the tower's financing for Mori Building.

=== Construction ===
The tower's foundation stone was laid on 27 August 1997. In the late 1990s, the Pierre de Smet Building Corporation suffered a funding shortage caused by the 1997 Asian financial crisis, which halted the project after the foundations were completed. On 13 February 2003, the Mori Group increased the building's height to 492 m (1,614 ft) and 101 stories, from the initial plans for a 460-metre (1,509 ft), 94-story building. The new building used the foundations of the original design, and construction work was resumed on 16 November 2003.

A fire broke out in the incomplete SWFC on 14 August 2007. The fire was first noticed on the 40th floor, around 16:30 (GMT +8), and soon the smoke was clearly seen outside the building. By 17:45, the fire had been extinguished. The damage was reported to be slight, and nobody was injured in the accident. The cause of the fire remains unknown, but according to some sources the preliminary investigation suggested workers' electric weldings caused the fire.

The building reached its full height of 492 m (1,614 ft) on 14 September 2007 after the installation of the final steel girder. The final cladding panels were installed in mid-June 2008, and elevator installation was finished in mid-July. The Shanghai World Financial Center was declared complete on 17 July 2008, and was officially opened on 28 August. On 30 August 2008, the tower's observation floors were opened to the public.

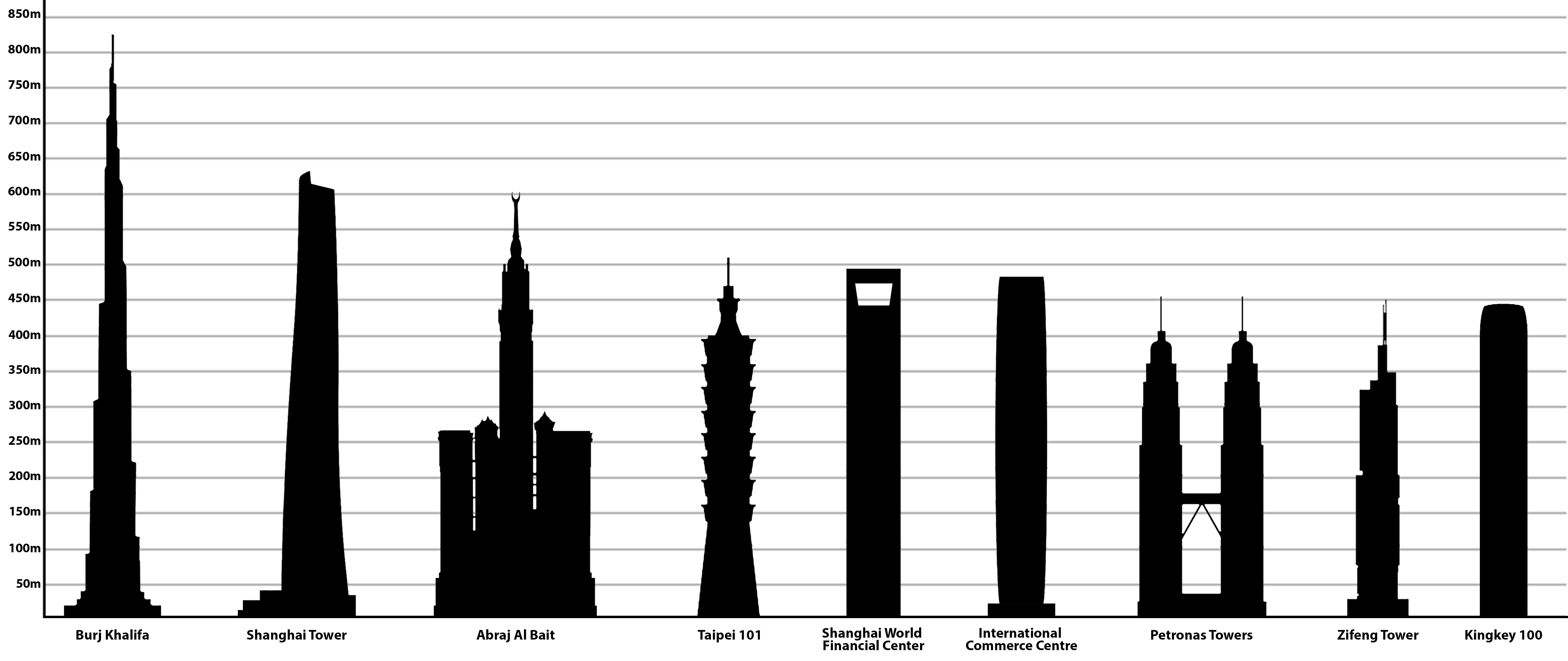
The Shanghai World Financial Center compared with other skyscrapers.

Since the completion of the adjacent Shanghai Tower in 2016, the World Financial Center observation deck was no longer the tallest in Shanghai and consequently saw decreasing visitor numbers. This situation was exacerbated by the COVID-19 pandemic, which in 2023 led to the deck's permanent closing.

== Architecture ==
Shanghai World Financial Center
- Simplified Chinese: 上海环球 金融中心
- Traditional Chinese: 上海環球 金融中心
Transcriptions
Standard Mandarin
- Hanyu Pinyin: Shànghǎi huánqiú jīnróng zhōngxīn
- Wade–Giles: Shanghai huanch'iu chinjung chunghsin
- IPA: [ʂâŋxàɪ xwǎntɕʰjǒʊ tɕínɻʊ̌ŋ ʈʂʊ́ŋɕín]
Wu
- Romanization: Zaanhe guejjieu jinhhion tsonxin [zɑ̃²³hɛ³⁴ ɡuɛ²³dʑiɤ²³ tɕin⁵³ɦioŋ²³ tsoŋ⁵³ɕin⁵³]

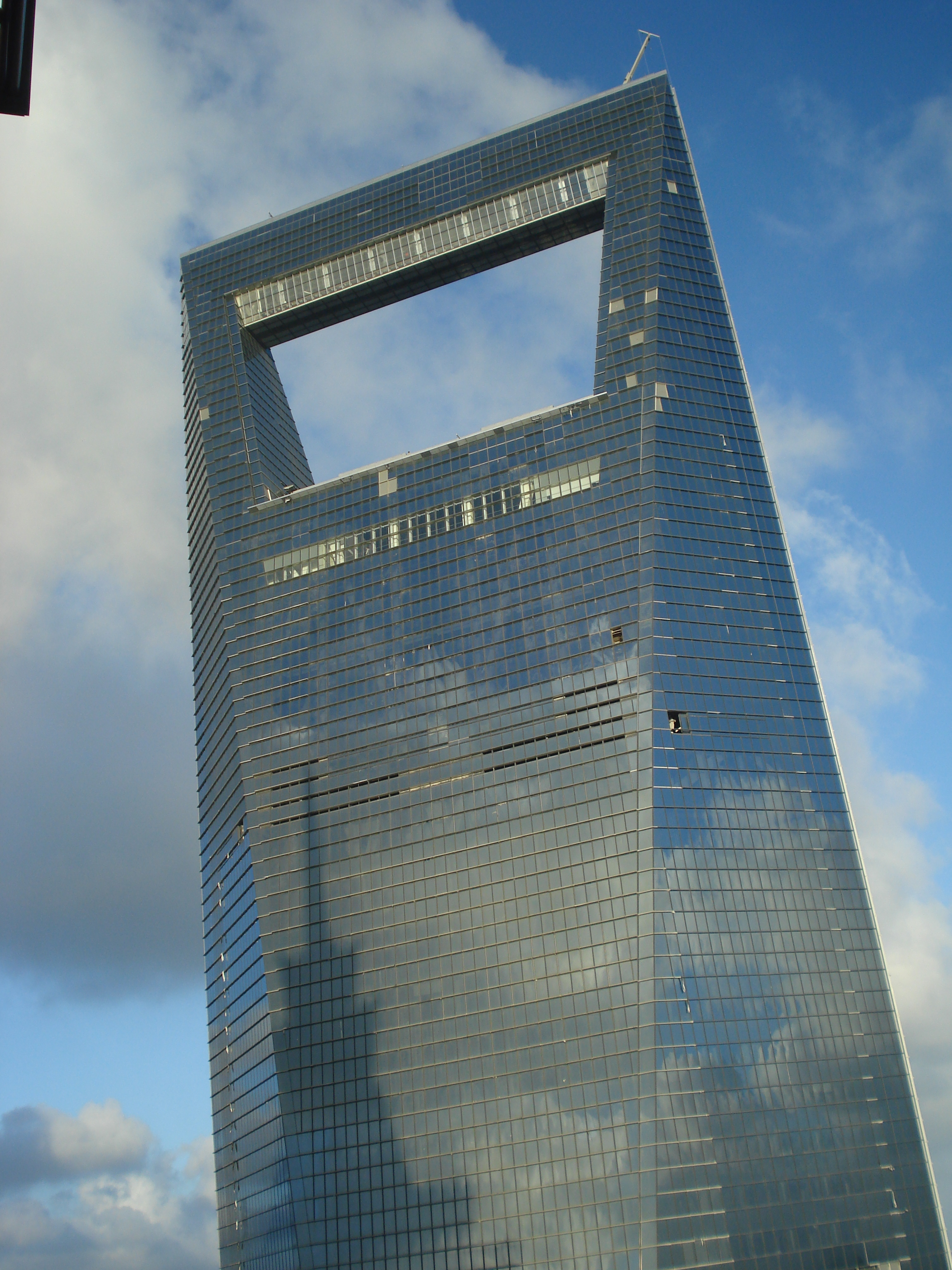
The top of the building, with the aperture clearly visible.

The most distinctive feature of the SWFC's design is the trapezoid aperture at the peak. The original design specified a circular aperture, 46 m (151 ft) in diameter, to reduce the stresses of wind pressure and to reference the Chinese mythological depiction of the sky as a circle. It also resembled a Chinese moon gate due to its circular form in Chinese architecture. However, this initial design began facing protests from some Chinese, including the mayor of Shanghai, Chen Liangyu, who considered it too similar to the rising sun design of the Japanese flag. This was controversial due to Japan's ties to war crimes in China and other parts of Asia. Pedersen then suggested that a bridge be placed at the bottom of the aperture to make it less circular. On 18 October 2005, KPF submitted an alternative design to Mori Building and a trapezoidal hole replaced the circle at the top of the tower, which in addition to changing the controversial design, would also be cheaper and easier to implement, according to the architects. Foreigners and Chinese alike informally refer to the building as "the bottle opener". Metal replicas of the building that function as actual bottle openers are sold in the tower's gift shop.

The tower features three separate observation decks which constitute the floors above and below the aperture opening. The height of the lowest observation deck, located on the 94th floor, is 423 m (1,388 ft); the second, on the 97th floor, is at a height of 439 m (1,440 ft); and the highest, on the 100th floor, is 474 m (1,555 ft) high.

The skyscraper's roof height is set at 492 m (1,614 ft), and was at one point the highest roof in the world. Before construction on the roof was completed, the SWFC's total height was scheduled to be 509.2 m (1,671 ft) so that it would exceed the height of the Taipei 101, but a height limit was imposed, allowing the roof to reach a maximum height of 492 metres. Architect William Pedersen and developer Minoru Mori resisted suggestions to add a spire that would surpass that of Taipei 101 and perhaps One World Trade Center, calling the SWFC a "broad-shouldered building". The SWFC boasts a gross floor area of more than 377,300 m^{2} (4,061,200 sq ft), 31 elevators, and 33 escalators.

=== Structural efficiency ===
The tower's trapezoid aperture is made up of structural steel and reinforced concrete. A large number of forces, such as wind loads, the people in the building and heavy equipment housed in the building, act on the SWFC's structure. These compressive and bending forces are carried down to the ground by the diagonal-braced frame (with added outrigger trusses). The design employs an effective use of material, because it decreases the thickness of the outer core shear walls and the weight of the structural steel in the perimeter.

== Tenants ==
Shanghai World Financial Center hosts the office building for many international financial companies, including those involved in banking, insurance, securities and consulting and advisory financial firms, such as Ernst & Young, Morgan Stanley, BNP Paribas, Commerzbank, Bank of Yokohama, Sumitomo Mitsui Banking Corporation and Korea Development Bank. Google's Shanghai branch is located on the 60th-61st floors.

== Floor Plan ==
| Floor | Purpose |
|---|---|
| 101 | Mechanical Floor |
| 100 | Sky Walk Observatory |
| 99 | Mechanical Floor |
| 98 | Mechanical Floor |
| 97 | Sky Walk |
| 96 | Mechanical Floor |
| 95 | Sky Arena |
| 94 | Sky Arena |
| 93 | 100 Century Avenue Park Hyatt Restaurant |
| 92 | 100 Century Avenue Park Hyatt Restaurant |
| 91 | 100 Century Avenue Park Hyatt Restaurant |
| 90 | Refuge Floor |
| 89 | Mechanical Floor |
| 88 | Hotel Suite |
| 87 | Hotel Lobby, Dining |
| 86 | Meeting Rooms, Dining |
| 85 | Swimming Pool, Spa and Fitness Center |
| 84 | Hotel Guestrooms |
| 83 | Hotel Guestrooms |
| 82 | Hotel Guestrooms |
| 81 | Hotel Guestrooms |
| 80 | Hotel Guestrooms |
| 79 | Hotel Guestrooms |
| 78 | Refuge Floor |
| 77 | Office Zone 6 |
| 76 | Office Zone 6 |
| 75 | Office Zone 6 |
| 74 | Office Zone 6 |
| 73 | Office Zone 6 |
| 72 | Office Zone 6 |
| 71 | Office Zone 6 |
| 70 | Office Zone 6 |
| 69 | Office Zone 6 |
| 68 | Office Zone 6 |
| 67 | Office Zone 6 |
| 66 | Refuge floor |
| 65 | Office Zone 5 |
| 64 | Office Zone 5 |
| 63 | Office Zone 5 |
| 62 | Office Zone 5 |
| 61 | Office Zone 5 |
| 60 | Office Zone 5 |
| 59 | Office Zone 5 |
| 58 | Office Zone 5 |
| 57 | Office Zone 5 |
| 56 | Office Zone 5 |
| 55 | Office Zone 5 |
| 54 | Refuge floor |
| 53 | Sky Lobby |
| 52 | Sky Lobby |
| 51 | Office Zone 4 |
| 50 | Office Zone 4 |
| 49 | Office Zone 4 |
| 48 | Office Zone 4 |
| 47 | Office Zone 4 |
| 46 | Office Zone 4 |
| 45 | Office Zone 4 |
| 44 | Office Zone 4 |
| 43 | Office Zone 4 |
| 42 | Refuge Floor |
| 41 | Office Zone 3 |
| 40 | Office Zone 3 |
| 39 | Office Zone 3 |
| 38 | Office Zone 3 |
| 37 | Office Zone 3 |
| 36 | Office Zone 3 |
| 35 | Office Zone 3 |
| 34 | Office Zone 3 |
| 33 | Office Zone 3 |
| 32 | Office Zone 3 |
| 31 | Office Zone 3 |
| 30 | Refuge floor |
| 29 | Sky Lobby, Media Center |
| 28 | Sky Lobby, Media Center |
| 27 | Office Zone 2 |
| 26 | Office Zone 2 |
| 25 | Office Zone 2 |
| 24 | Office Zone 2 |
| 23 | Office Zone 2 |
| 22 | Office Zone 2 |
| 21 | Office Zone 2 |
| 20 | Office Zone 2 |
| 19 | Office Zone 2 |
| 18 | Refuge Floor |
| 17 | Office Zone 1 |
| 16 | Office Zone 1 |
| 15 | Office Zone 1 |
| 14 | Office Zone 1 |
| 13 | Office Zone 1 |
| 12 | Office Zone 1 |
| 11 | Office Zone 1 |
| 10 | Office Zone 1 |
| 9 | Office Zone 1 |
| 8 | Office Zone 1 |
| 7 | Office Zone 1 |
| 6 | Refuge floor |
| 5 | SWFC Forum |
| 4 | SWFC Forum |
| 3 | Observatory Exit, SWFC Forum |
| 2 | SWFC Forum, Retail |
| 1 | Office and Hotel Lobby, Retail |
| B1 | Retail, Observatory Entrance, Parking |
| B2 | Retail, Observatory Entrance, Parking |
| B3 | Shopping, Parking, Loading Dock |

== Transport ==
- Shanghai Metro: Line 2 at Lujiazui Station is a 10-minute walk to the center.

== Awards ==
Shanghai World Financial Center was named by architects as the best skyscraper completed in 2008, receiving both the Best Tall Building Overall and Asia & Australasia awards from the Council on Tall Buildings and Urban Habitat (CTBUH). CTBUH's Carol Willis, head of New York's Skyscraper Museum, stated: "The simplicity of its form as well as its size dramatizes the idea of the skyscraper." Architect Tim Johnson noted its innovative structural design: "Steel trusses guard against the forces of wind and earthquake and made the building lighter, made it use less steel, and contributed to its sustainability." Johnson described the SWFC's structure as "nothing short of genius."

== Gallery ==
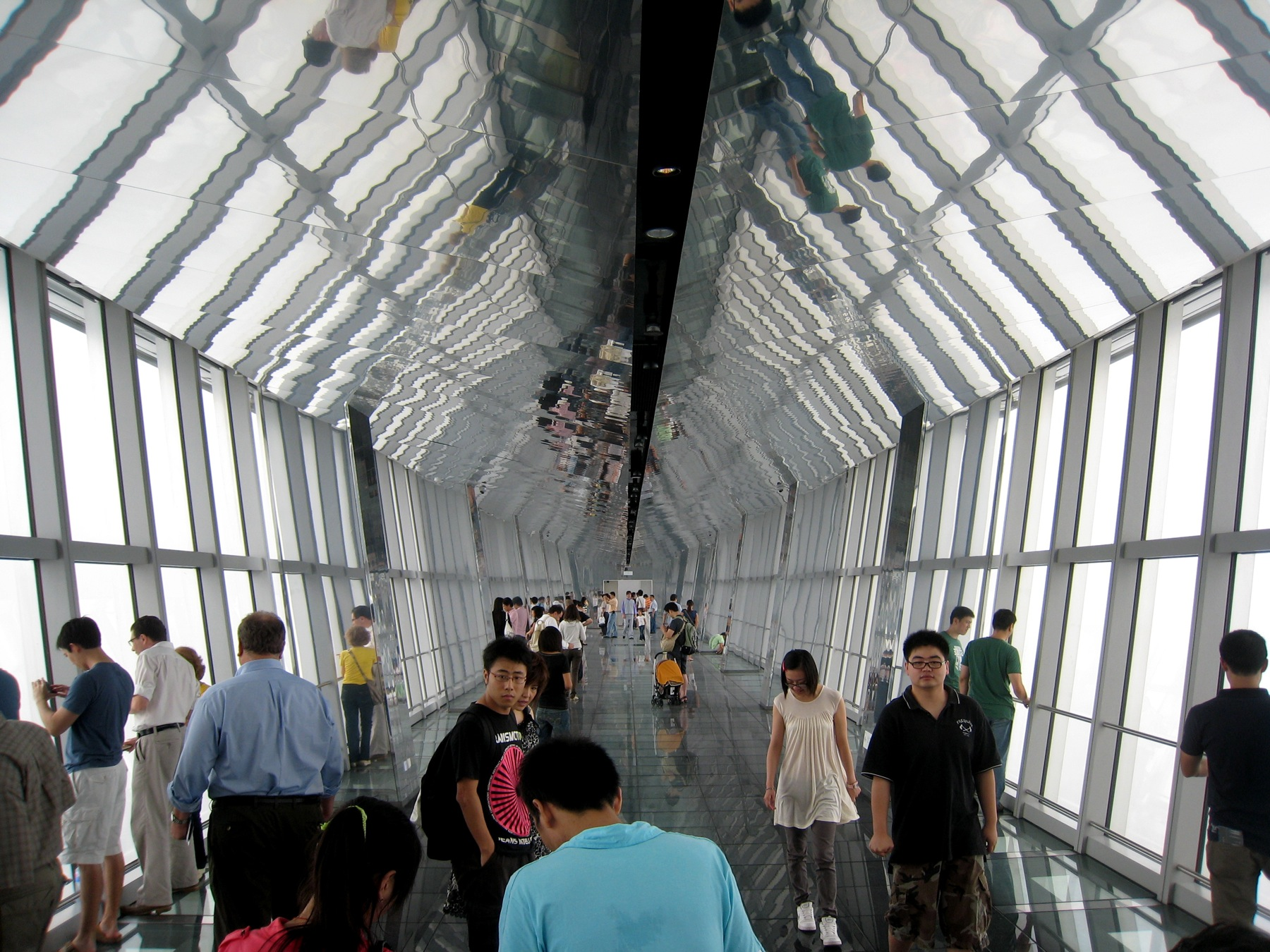
Inside the tower's observation deck.

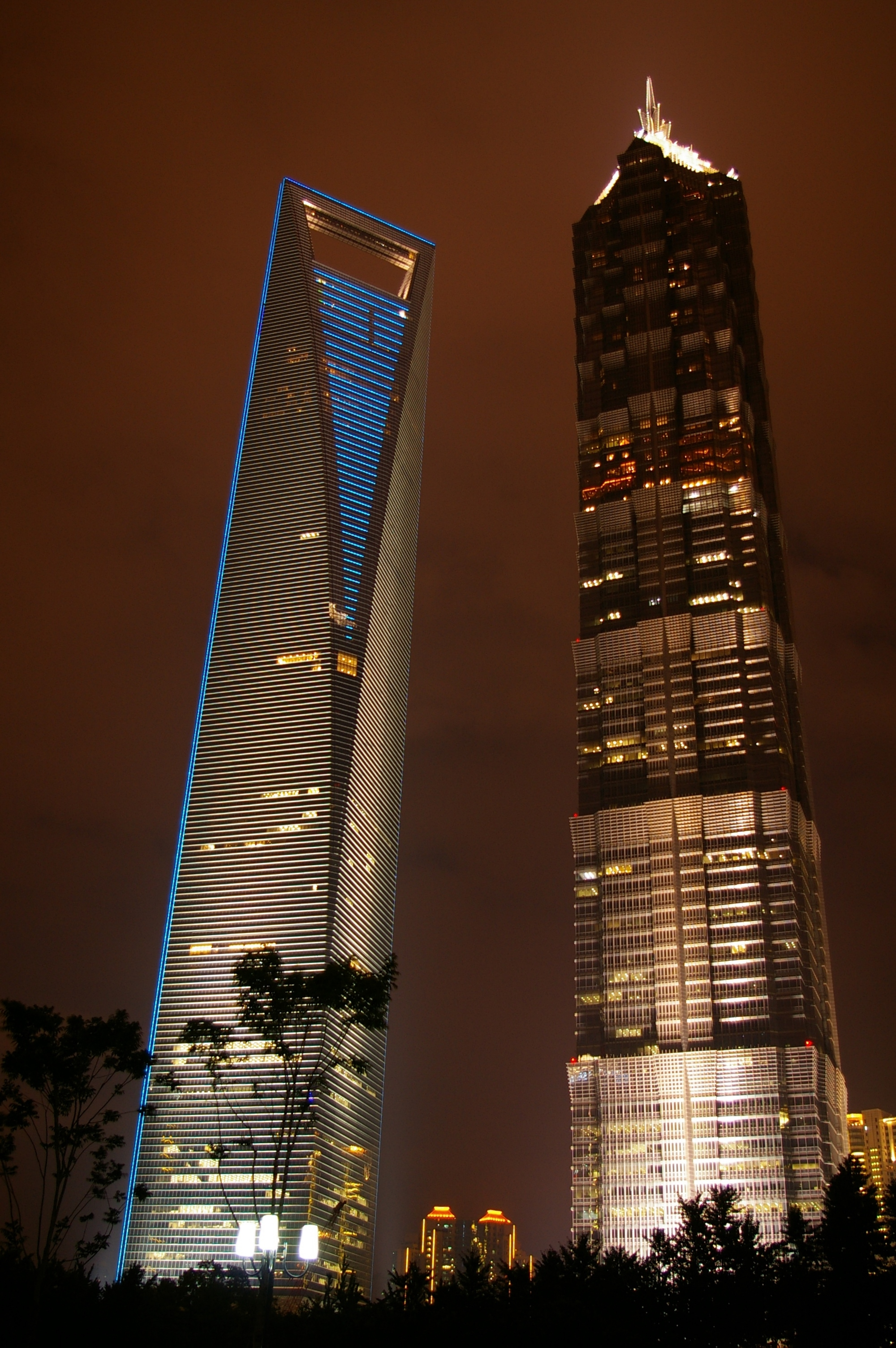
Shanghai World Financial Center (left) and the Jin Mao Tower.

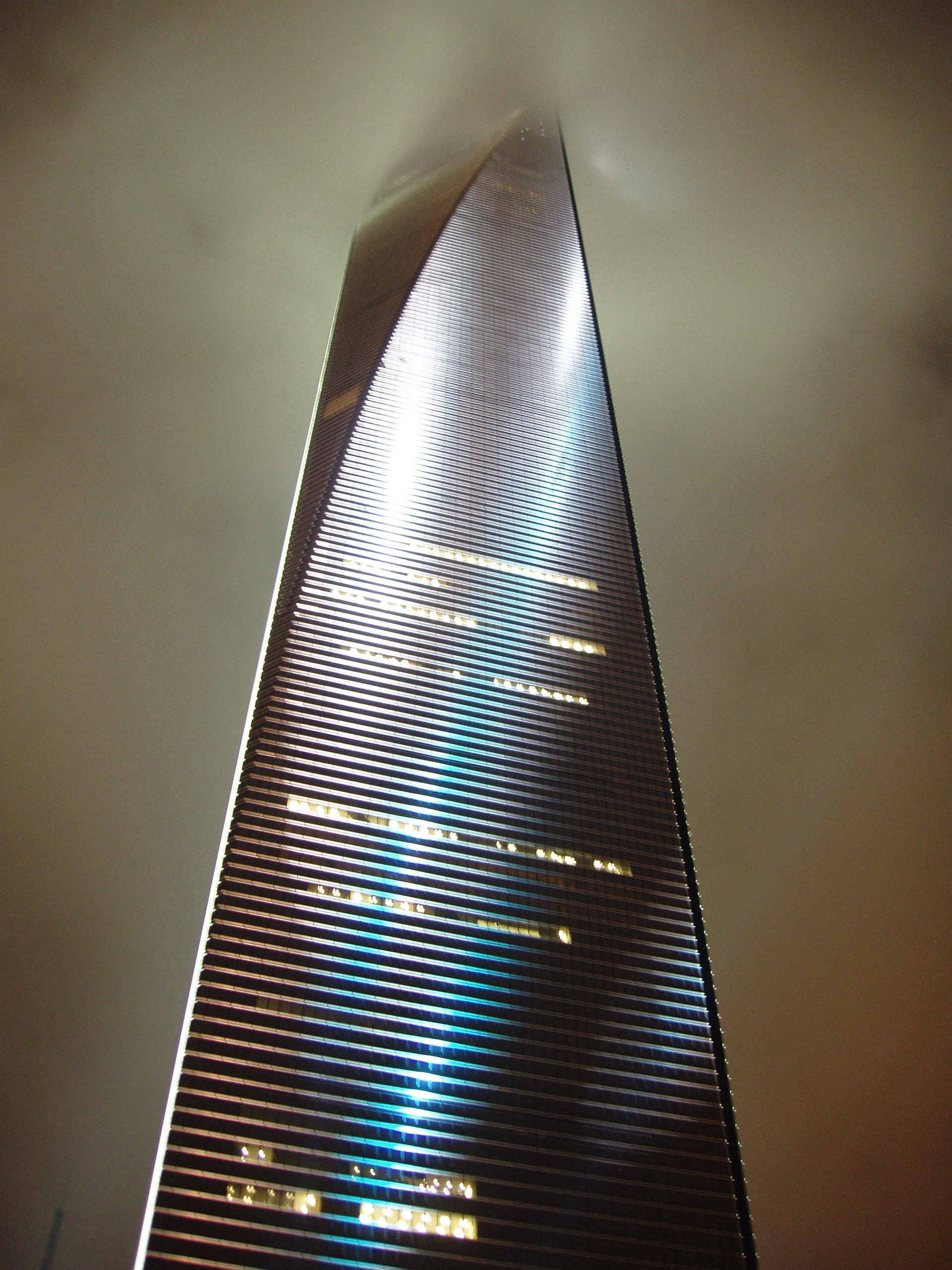
At night.

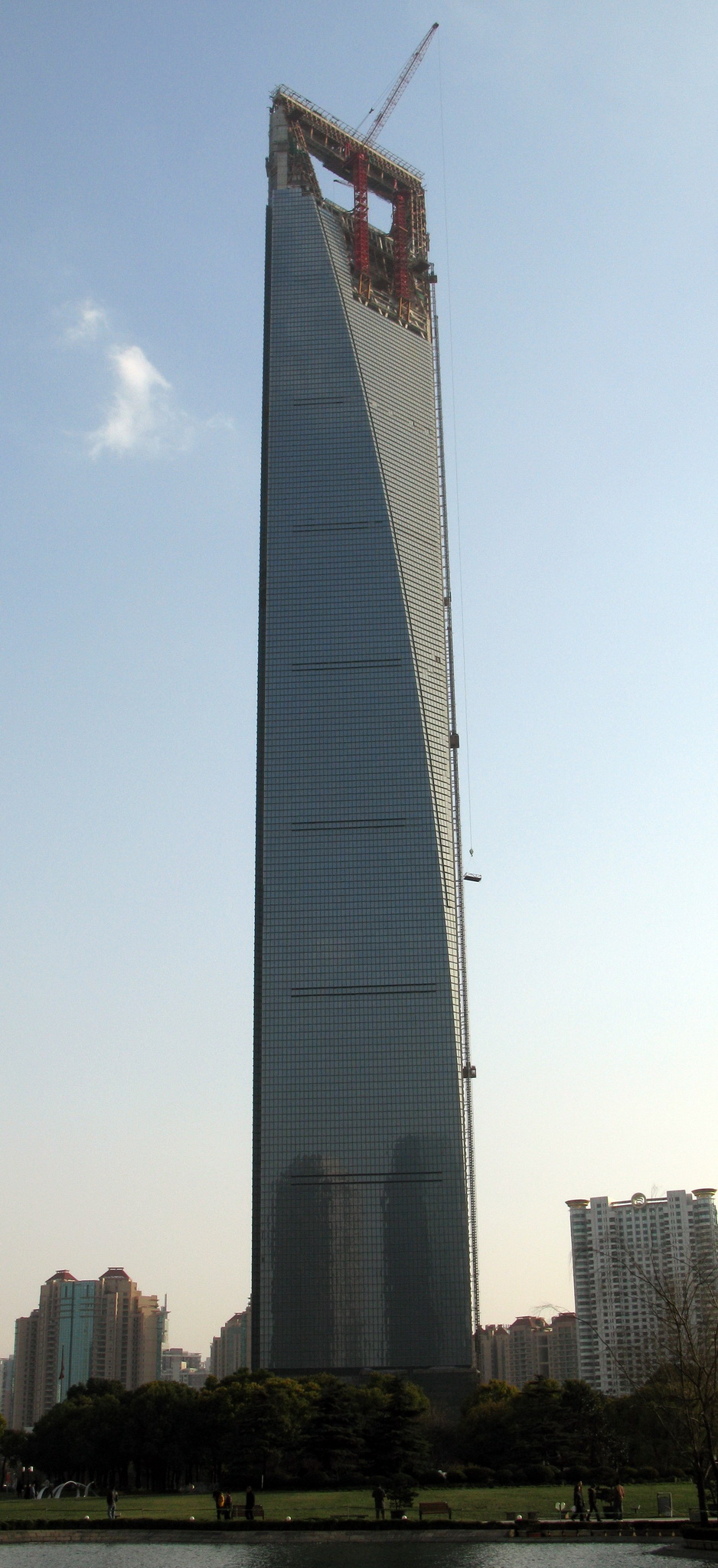
Under construction.

== See also ==
- List of tallest buildings in Shanghai

=== Similar towers ===
- Kingdom Centre, building in Saudi Arabia

Records
| Preceded by Jin Mao Tower | Tallest building in China; 487.4 m (1,599.1 ft); 2007–2014 | Succeeded by Shanghai Tower |
| Preceded by Jin Mao Tower | Tallest building in Shanghai; 2007–2014 | Succeeded by Shanghai Tower |
| Preceded by Taipei 101 | World's highest roof 487.4 m (1,599.1 ft); 2008–2010 | Succeeded by Burj Khalifa |
