= 245 Park Avenue =

Office skyscraper in Manhattan, New York

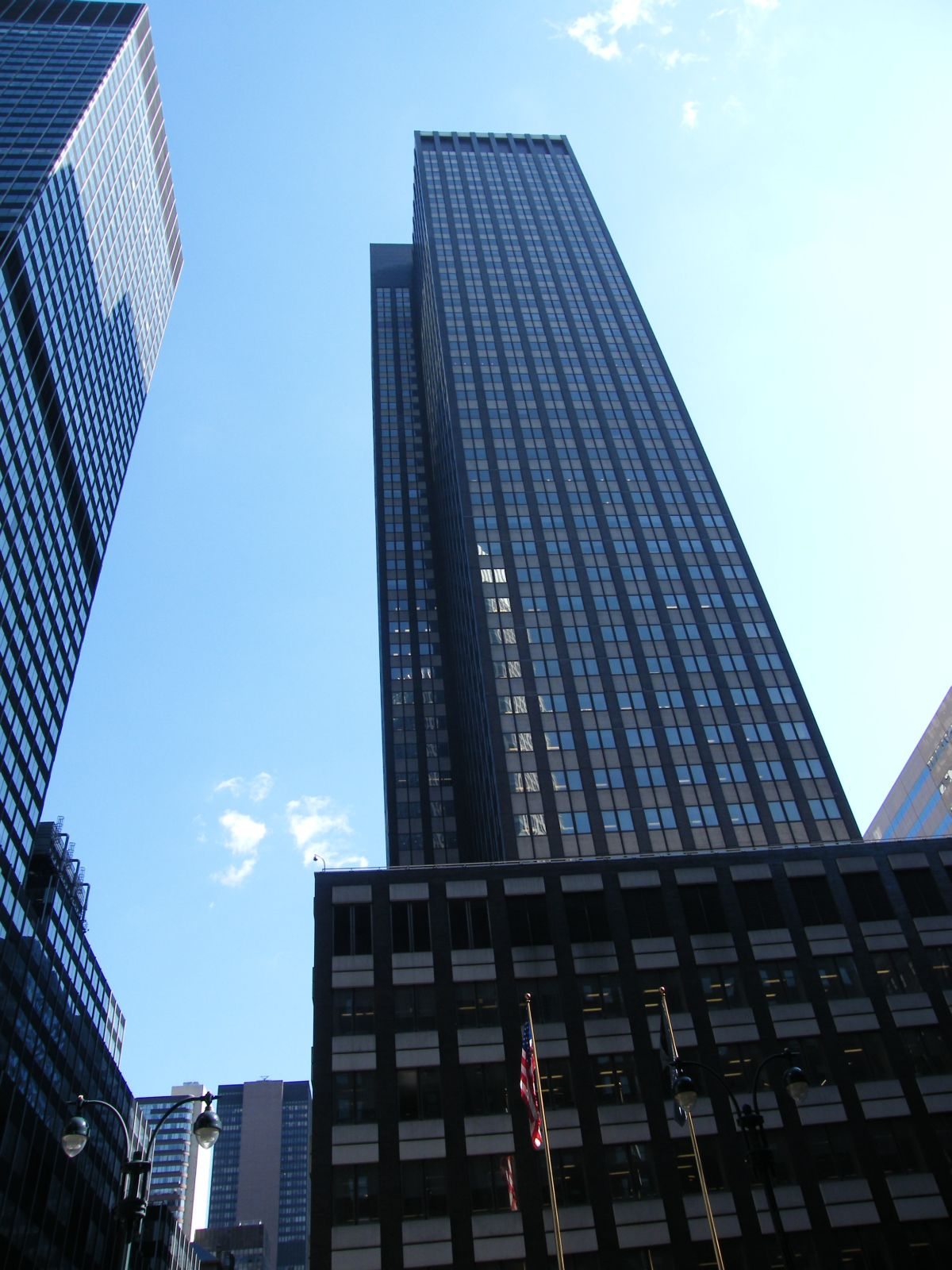
- Interactive map of the 245 Park Avenue area

General information
- Status: Completed
- Type: Office
- Coordinates: 40°45′18″N 73°58′30″W
- Completed: 1967
- Owner: SL Green Realty and Mori Trust

Height
- Roof: 648 ft (198 m)

Technical details
- Floor count: 48
- Floor area: 1,719,000 sq ft (159,700 m^{2})

Design and construction
- Architect: Shreve, Lamb and Harmon
- Developer: Uris Buildings Corporation

245 Park Avenue is a 648-foot (198 m) skyscraper in Midtown Manhattan, New York City. Designed by Shreve, Lamb and Harmon, it was completed in 1967 and contains 1.7 million square feet (160,000 m^{2}) on 48 floors. The Building Owners and Managers Association awarded the 2000/2001 Pinnacle Award to 245 Park Avenue. The building is assigned its own ZIP Code, 10167; it was one of 41 buildings in Manhattan that had their own ZIP Codes as of 2019.

== History ==
The site used to be occupied by the second Grand Central Palace exhibition hall, which was demolished in 1964 to make way for 245 Park Avenue. The building was previously named for American Tobacco Company, American Brands, and Bear Stearns at various points in its history.

In 1987, Bear Stearns signed a lease for more than 500,000 square feet (46,000 m^{2}) of space as its new headquarters and moved 3,000 of the company's employees into the building.

In November 2000, JPMorgan Chase leased 580,000 square feet (54,000 m^{2}) in the building, creating a corporate campus with the company's nearby headquarters at 270 Park Avenue.

On March 20, 2017, Chinese conglomerate HNA Group announced a deal to acquire the building for $2.21 billion from Brookfield Property Partners and the New York State Teachers’ Retirement System, one of the highest prices ever paid for a New York skyscraper. HNA financed the acquisition with a $1.75 billion loan from a consortium of lenders including J.P. Morgan Chase, Deutsche Bank, Barclays, Natixis and Societe Generale in addition to $568 million of mezzanine financing. CBRE Group and Cooper-Horowitz made the deal for the loan, acting as commercial mortgage brokers.

Following financial difficulties at HNA in 2018, the conglomerate committed to selling off $22 billion in stocks and real estate assets. Part of this commitment included the sale of a $148 million stake in 245 Park Avenue to office REIT SL Green, which was also appointed as property manager and leasing manager. SL Green took over the entire property in late 2022 after HNA went bankrupt. The next year, Japanese developer Mori Trust agreed to buy a 49.9% interest in the building from SL Green. By mid-2024, the owners were renovating the building and adding a golf lounge, restaurant, wellness center, and communal rooftop space; this renovation was designed by Kohn Pedersen Fox and Fogarty Finger. At the time, the building's mortgage was classified as a "loan of concern" because two large tenants were moving out. SL Green also announced plans to renovate the building's plaza in late 2024.

== Tenants ==
- Ares Management, 98,095 square feet (9,113.3 m^{2}) on floors 42-44
- HNA Group, 38,383 square feet (3,565.9 m^{2}) on floor 40
- Houlihan Lokey, 115,396 square feet (10,720.6 m^{2}) on floors 16-20
- IWG, 38,382 square feet (3,565.8 m^{2}) on floor 39
- JLL, 15,939 square feet (1,480.8 m^{2}) on floor 16
- JPMorgan Chase, 90,708 square feet (8,427.0 m^{2}) on floors 2 & 16
- National Australia Bank, 37,385 square feet (3,473.2 m^{2}) on floor 28
- Norinchukin Bank, 36,346 square feet (3,376.7 m^{2}) on floor 21
- Pioneer Financial, 14,252 square feet (1,324.1 m^{2}) on floor 17
- Rabobank, 115,157 square feet (10,698.4 m^{2}) on floors 36-38
- SEB, 20,695 square feet (1,922.6 m^{2}) on floor 33
- Societe Generale, 593,344 square feet (55,123.5 m^{2}) on floors 3-14
- MIO Partners on floor 13
- TPG Angelo Gordon, 113,405 square feet (10,535.7 m^{2}) on floors 24-26
- Vestar Capital Partners, 22,502 square feet (2,090.5 m^{2}) on floor 41
- WisdomTree Investments, 37,923 square feet (3,523.2 m^{2}) on floor 35
- Woori Bank, 14,320 square feet (1,330 m^{2}) on floor 43

== See also ==
- List of tallest buildings in New York City
