= Roppongi Hills Mori Tower =

Skyscraper in Tokyo, Japan

- 六本木ヒルズ森タワー
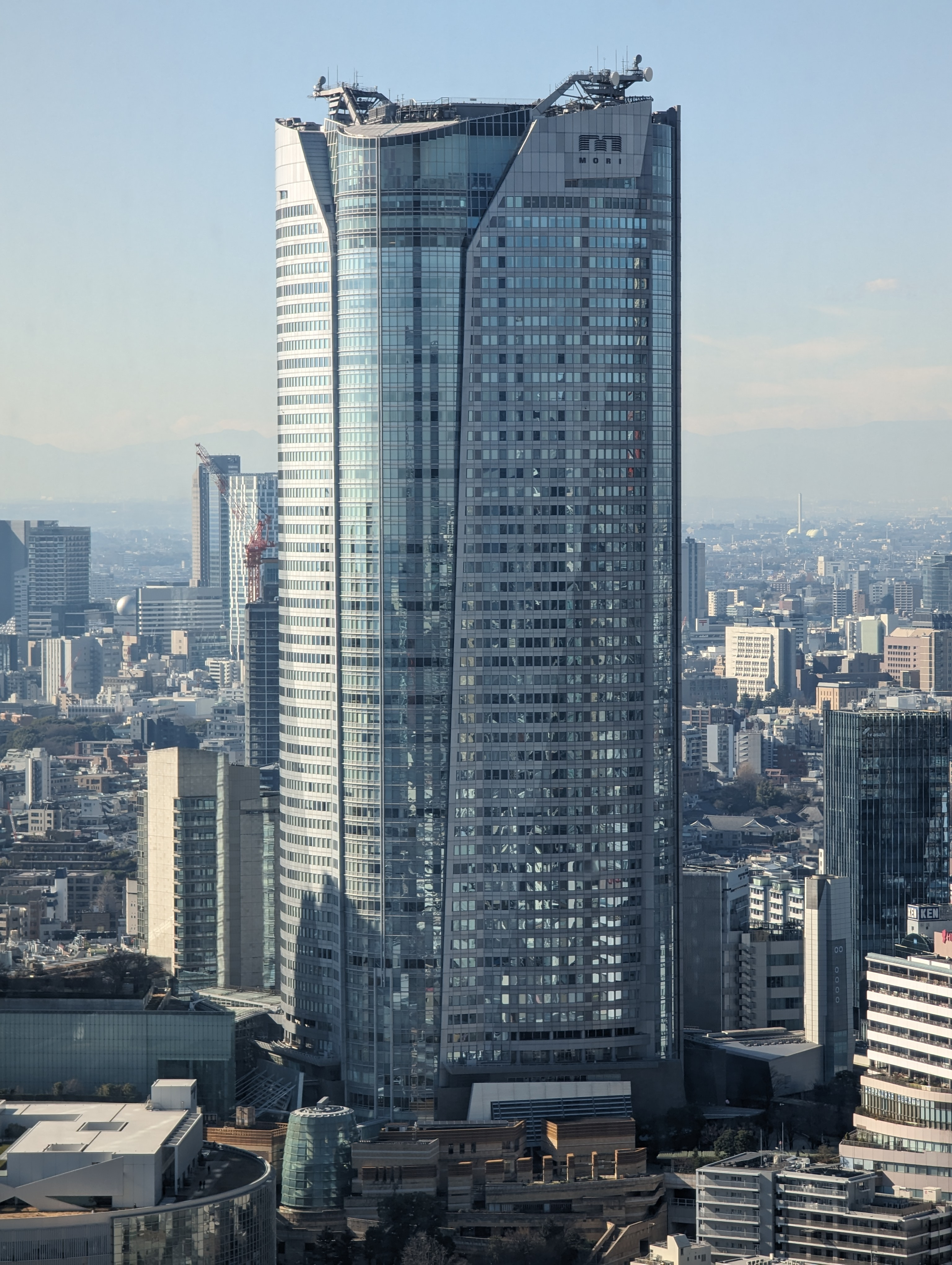
- The Roppongi Hills Mori Tower, as taken in 2024

General information
- Location: 6-10-1 Roppongi, Minato; Tokyo, Japan
- Coordinates: 35°39′38″N 139°43′45″E
- Construction started: March 2000; 26 years ago
- Completed: March 2003; 23 years ago
- Opening: April 25, 2003; 23 years ago

Height
- Roof: 238 meters (781 ft)
- Observatory: 229.3 meters (752 ft)

Technical details
- Floor count: 54 above ground 6 below ground
- Floor area: 380,105 m^{2} (4,091,420 sq ft)
- Lifts/elevators: 67

Design and construction
- Architects: Kohn Pedersen Fox, The Jerde Partnership
- Main contractor: Mori Building Company

Roppongi Hills Mori Tower (六本木ヒルズ森タワー, Roppongi Hiruzu Mori Tawā) is a 54-story mixed-use skyscraper in Roppongi, Minato, Tokyo, Japan. Completed in 2003 and named after builder Minoru Mori, it is the centerpiece of the Roppongi Hills urban development. It is the twelfth-tallest building in Tokyo at 238 meters (781 ft). The tower has a floor space area of 379,408 square meters (4,083,910 sq ft), making it one of the largest buildings in the world by this measure.

The Mori Tower building is primarily used for office space, but it also includes retail stores, restaurants and other attractions. The Mori Art Museum is located on the 53rd floor. Visitors can view the city from observation decks on the 52nd and 54th floors. The headquarters of Mori Building Company are located in this building.

== Facilities ==
Mori Tower is a mixed-use facility that is used for retail and office space. The tower's first six floors house retail stores and restaurants.

=== Mori Arts Center and Art Museum ===
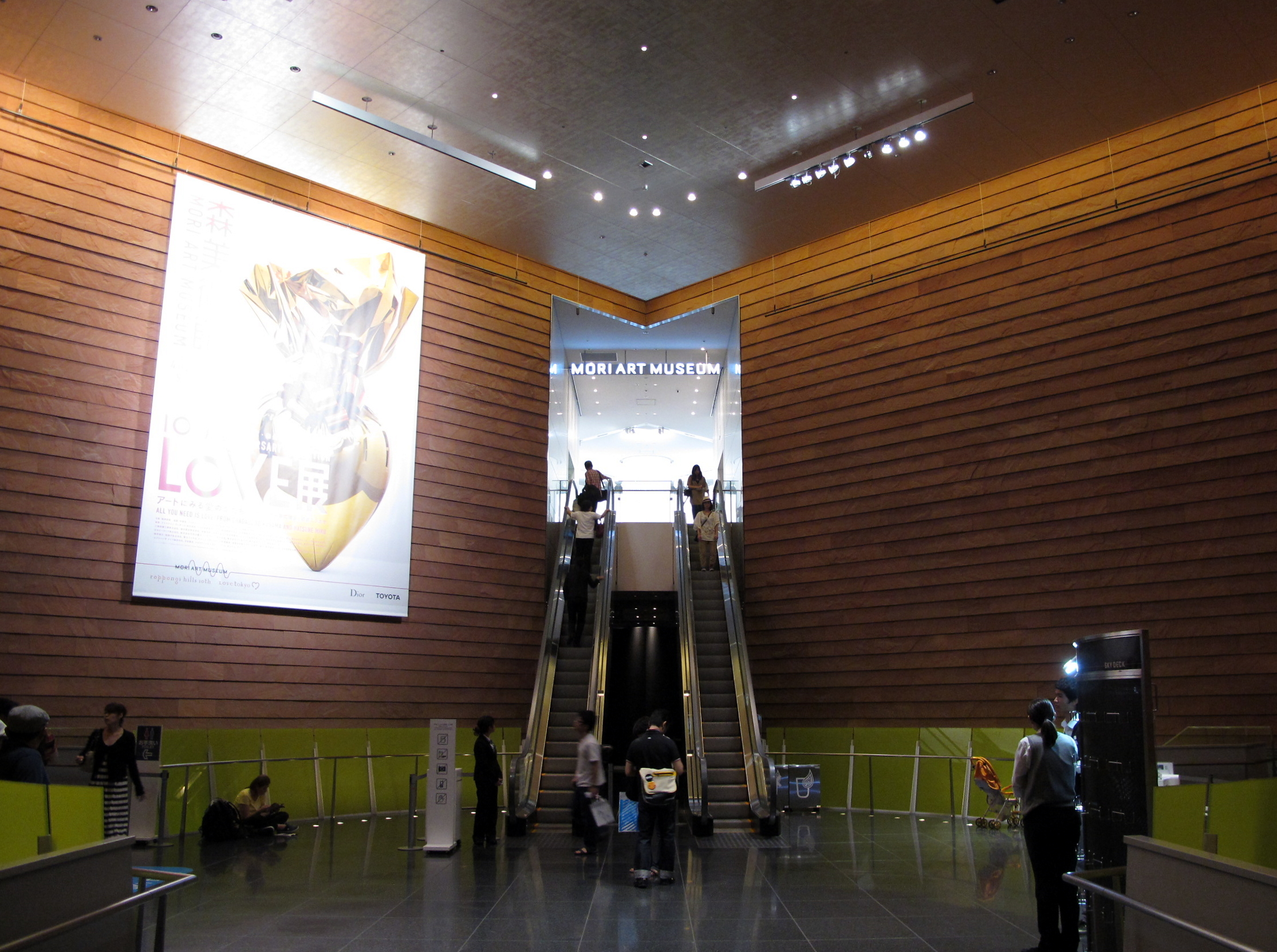
The Mori Art Museum at 60/F

The Mori Arts Center is located on floors 49–54. This center includes various tourist attractions spread over the tower's top six floors. Two members-only facilities—a library and a private club—are located on floors 49 and 51, respectively. Visitors are provided with views of the city at Tokyo City View on the 52nd floor and an open-air roof deck on the 54th floor.

Opening in October 2003, the Mori Art Museum is the centerpiece of the Mori Arts Center. Its interior was designed by Gluckman Mayner Architects. It originally occupied the entire 53rd floor and a portion of the 52nd floor. The museum's galleries on the 52nd floor have since been removed.

British-born David Elliott served as the museum's director until he resigned in late 2006. Fumio Nanjo assumed the position. The museum is one of the only venues in Tokyo with a percentage of foreign visitors comparable to the Tokyo National Museum, but it attracts fewer visitors in total.

=== Office tenants ===
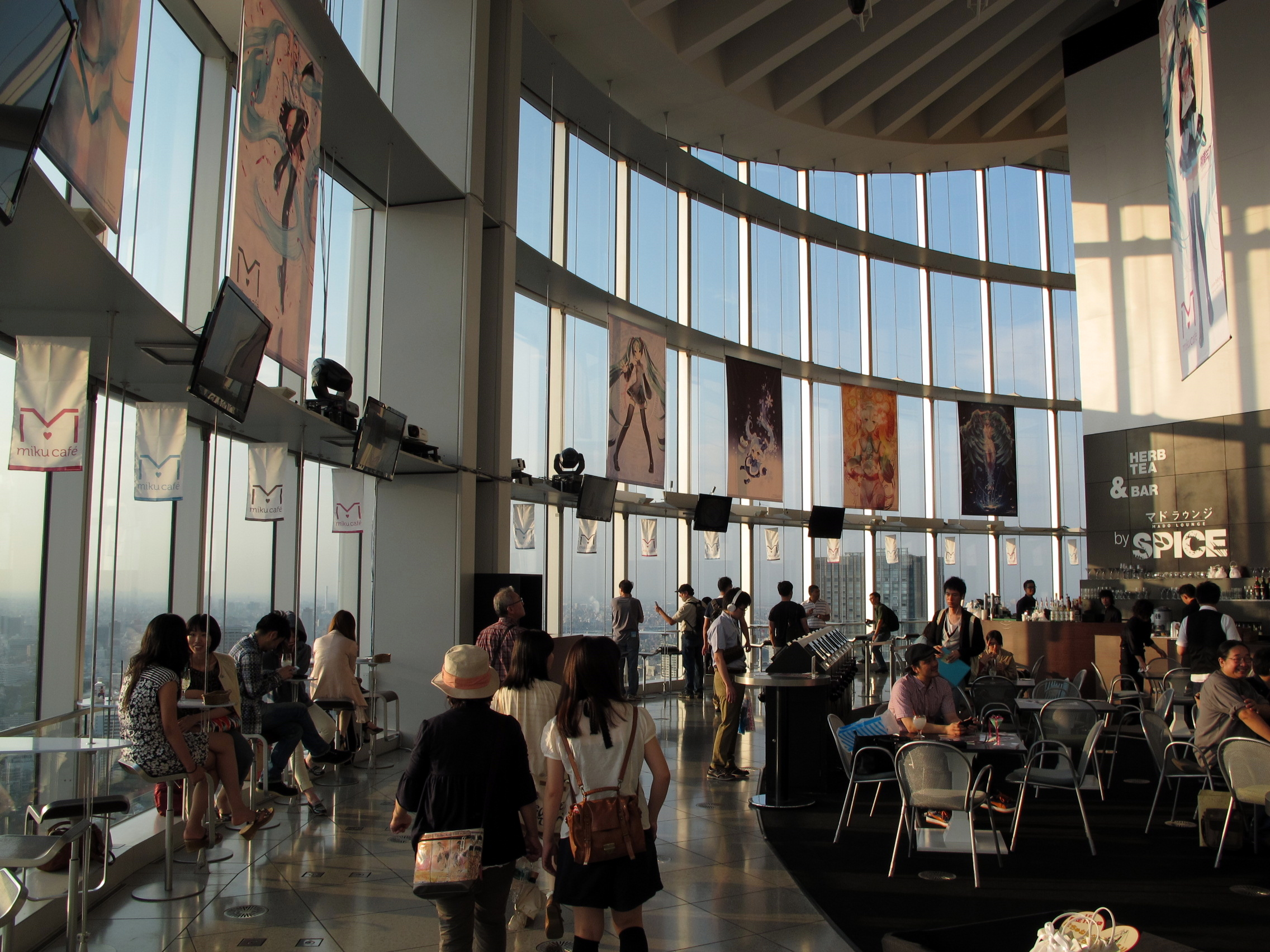
The Tokyo City View Observation Deck before renovation, 2013

Floors 7–48 serve as office space and house corporate tenants, including:

- Airbus Japan K.K. (35F)
- A&O Shearman (38F)
- Apple (36F)
- Barclays (32F - 33F)
- BASF (21F)
- CIBC (15F)
- Goldman Sachs (42F, 45F - 48F)
- Village House 44F
- Expedia Japan and HomeAway Japan (31F)
- GREE, Inc. (8F - 9F, 11F - 14F)
- Lenovo Japan Ltd. (18F)
- McKinsey & Company (9F - 10F)
- Mercari (18F, 25F)
- Morgan, Lewis & Bockius (24F)
- Nokia Networks (29F)
- TMI Associates and Simmons & Simmons (23F)
- The Pokémon Company corporate headquarters (47F)
- Riot Games (34F)
- Strategy& (27F)

After the opening of Tokyo Midtown's Midtown Tower in 2007, former Mori Tower tenants such as Konami and Yahoo! Japan have relocated to the new tower. The space taken by Barclays was previously occupied by Lehman Brothers prior to its bankruptcy.

== Incidents ==
=== 2004 fatality ===
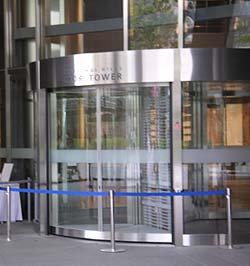
A child was killed when his head was crushed by this revolving door in 2004.

While on a tour of Mori Tower on the morning of 26 March 2004, six-year-old Ryo Mizokawa was killed in a revolving door at the building's second-floor main entrance. Mizokawa's head was crushed between the door rotating from his left and the outer frame; he died two hours after reaching the hospital. The door's motion safety sensor was originally set to detect anything standing 80 centimeters (31 in) tall. This setting was changed to 135 centimeters (53 in), after the door began stopping unnecessarily when detecting a newly installed safety barrier nearby.

After the incident, it was revealed that 32 people had previously sustained injuries caused by revolving doors at Roppongi Hills since the complex opened less than a year earlier. In September of the same year, in an out-of-court settlement, the Mizokawa family received a compensation payment of approximately 70 million yen from the building's operator, Mori Building Company. This sum was approximately equivalent to the cost of two doors of the type that caused the fatality.

In March 2005, prosecutors indicted three people on charges of professional negligence resulting in death: senior Mori Building Co. executives Yuzo Tada and Yukihiro Koyama and an executive from the revolving door's manufacturer, Sanwa Tajima Corporation, Hisanobu Kubo. Prosecutors argued that the Mori Building officials did not implement safety measures proposed after previous incidents because they would detract from the tower's entrance appearance. All three pleaded guilty to the charges, and in September they received three-year suspended prison sentences of 10 months, 10 months and 14 months, respectively.

=== Livedoor incident ===
In January 2006, one of the building's tenants, livedoor, a Japanese internet service provider, was raided by police. The incident resulted in the arrests of two executives and the company has since relocated its headquarters.

=== 2007 fire ===
On 4 April 2007, an elevator system in Mori Tower produced a fire that destroyed part of the tower's lift-motor room and forced hundreds of people to evacuate the building. According to the elevator's manufacturer, Otis Elevator Company, a frayed cable scraping surrounding lift system components produced enough sparks to ignite a fire. After the fire, it was discovered that Otis had been aware of rusted and frayed cables in the tower's elevator systems since January 2005. The incident spawned nationwide inspections of Japanese elevators by both Nippon Otis and the Land, Infrastructure and Transport Ministry. The ministry inspection of approximately 260,000 elevators turned up problems in 813 elevators.

== See also ==
- List of tallest buildings and structures in Tokyo
