= Taikichiro Mori =

Japanese businessman

- 森 泰吉郎
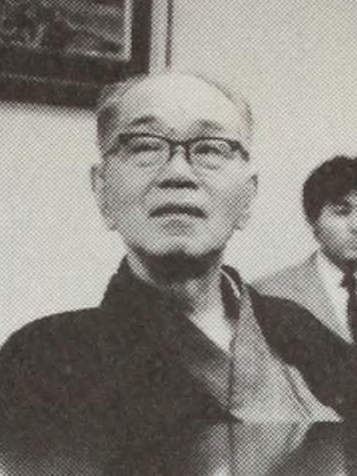
- Mori c. 1985
- Born: 1 March 1904; Tokyo, Japan
- Died: 30 January 1993 (aged 88); Tokyo, Japan
- Education: Hitotsubashi University
- Occupations: Businessman, real estate developer
- Known for: Founding Mori Building Company
- Awards: World's richest person (by Forbes, 1991–1992)

Taikichiro Mori (森 泰吉郎, Mori Taikichirō, 1 March 1904 – 30 January 1993) was a Japanese businessman who founded Mori Building Company.

Forbes ranked him as the richest man in the world during 1991-92, with a net worth of $15 billion in 1991 (approximately equivalent to $30.7 billion in today's value as of 2024). His sons, Minoru and Akira, headed Mori Building and the Mori Trust, respectively, and his granddaughter Miwako Date now runs the Mori Trust in her father's place.

== Biography ==
Taikichiro Mori was born in the Minato area of Tokyo, the son of a rice trader, who managed 30 buildings in the area.

Mori graduated from the Tokyo College of Commerce (now Hitotsubashi University) in 1928. He was appointed Professor at Kyoto Sericulture Technical High School (now Kyoto Institute of Technology) in 1932, and Yokohama Commercial School (now Yokohama City University) in 1946 where he served as Dean of the Faculty of Commerce from 1954 to 1959. While working for the university, he founded the Mori Building Company. After retiring from the university in 1959, he became the president of the company.

Mori died of heart failure in Tokyo on 30 January 1993, aged 88.
