= TPG Angelo Gordon =

American investment management company

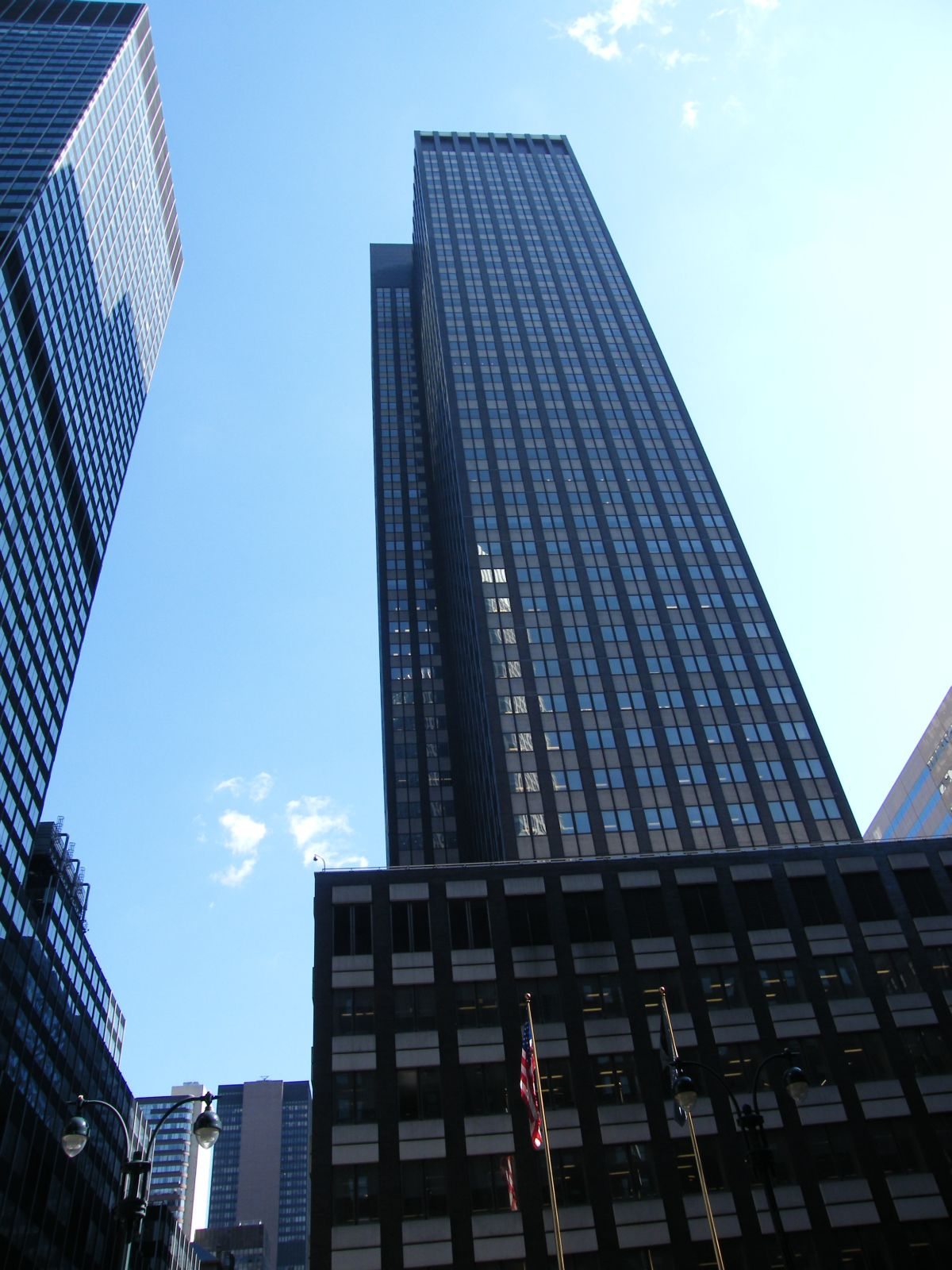
- Headquarters at 245 Park Avenue
- Formerly: Angelo, Gordon & Co. L.P.
- Type: Subsidiary
- Industry: Alternative investment management
- Founded: November 1988; 38 years ago
- Founders: John M. Angelo; Michael L. Gordon
- Headquarters: 245 Park Avenue; New York City, New York, U.S.
- Products: Real estate, credit, distressed securities, hedge funds
- AUM: US$73 billion (2023)
- Number of employees: 650 (2023)
- Parent: TPG Inc.; (2023–present)
- Website: angelogordon.com

TPG Angelo Gordon (formerly Angelo Gordon) is a global alternative investment manager founded in 1988 by John Angelo and Michael Gordon who together ran the arbitrage department of L.F. Rothschild in the 1980s. The firm focuses on four main investment disciplines: credit, real estate, private equity, and multi-strategy.

Within those broad categories, the firm offers products in distressed debt and non-investment grade corporate credit, convertible and merger arbitrage, residential and consumer debt, energy direct lending, real estate private equity, real estate debt and lending, net lease real estate, private equity, multi-strategy, and middle market direct lending. It offers two types of investment structures: open-ended hedge fund products and closed-ended private equity-style products.

The firm is headquartered in New York City with additional offices worldwide including in San Francisco, Los Angeles, Chicago, London, Amsterdam, Hong Kong, Seoul, Frankfurt, Tokyo and Singapore.

On November 2, 2023, TPG Inc. announced that it had completed the acquisition of Angelo Gordon.

== History ==
Angelo Gordon is 100% employee-owned, SEC-registered, and has over 600 employees and more than 200 investment professionals.

John Angelo and Michael Gordon founded the firm on strategies with which they had 15 years of prior experience: distressed securities, risk arbitrage, and convertible arbitrage. The multi-strategy platform was added in 1993 as a way to offer investors a single fund which captured many of Angelo Gordon’s investment strategies and could tactically allocate as markets shifted. In 1998, the leveraged loan business was added as an extension of the distressed debt business.

The firm began buying real estate as early as 1990 through investments in the distressed debt of bankrupt real estate companies. In 1993, as real estate markets buckled under the weight of too much debt, the firm launched its opportunistic real estate strategy investments to improve and reposition the property by increasing operating income.

In early 2002, the company added core plus real estate to its real estate strategies as it was able to benefit from its operating partner network, and purchase high quality real estate. Since 2005, the firm has expanded its real estate offerings through a dedicated opportunistic Asian real estate strategy. During the 2008 financial crisis and the Euro area crisis, Angelo Gordon added European real estate to its strategies as prices were depressed and liquidity was severely curtailed in the region.

Net Lease real estate strategy was established in 2005 to focus on below investment grade tenants. Angelo Gordon further expanded into the intersections of real estate and credit with the addition of real estate debt in 2006 and residential and consumer debt in 2008.

In 2009, Angelo Gordon was one of only nine private investment firms to partner with the U.S. Department of the Treasury, the Board of Governors of the Federal Reserve System, and the Federal Deposit Insurance Corporation in PPIP, the Private-Public Investment Partnership. The U.S. government invested alongside the selected firms to unlock the frozen credit markets during the 2008 financial crisis. This was a successful program.

The firm took advantage of the post-2008 financial crisis contraction in bank lending to smaller companies through senior secure direct lending to energy companies in 2013 and to middle market borrowers in the private equity sponsor community in 2014. Additionally, in 2014, the firm launched Twin Brook Capital Partners, its middle market direct lending subsidiary, which provides cash-flow based financing solutions for the middle market private equity community.

After becoming president of Angelo Gordon in October 2013, Larry Schloss left the company in March 2016. Five years after John M Angelo died, co-founder Michael Gordon stepped down as chief executive officer and co-chief investment officer on January 1, 2021, and was succeeded by co-chief investment officers Josh Baumgarten and Adam Schwartz.

In May 2023, private equity firm TPG Inc. announced it would acquire Angelo Gordon in a cash and stock deal valued at $2.7 billion. The purchase was completed in November.

== Leadership ==
Angelo Gordon is led by co-CEOs and co-CIOs Josh Baumgarten and Adam Schwartz. Baumgarten and Schwartz were appointed co-CEOs on January 1, 2021, after having served as co-CIOs for three years. Additionally, Mr. Baumgarten leads the firm’s credit business and Mr. Schwartz serves as the head of the firm’s global real estate group.

== Awards and recognition ==
Angelo Gordon's portfolio managers have in recent years been noted for top performance in their investment strategies. Angelo Gordon's CMBS fund and the non-investment grade corporate credit fund were recognized by Bloomberg for Best Performance for Directional Fixed Income (2011–2014.) The RMBS/ABS fund appeared in Barron's Top 100 Hedge Funds in 2013 and in 2014. Angelo Gordon's flagship multistrategy fund appeared in Business Insider's 100 Most Successful Hedge Funds in 2012, Bloomberg's 100 Top Performing Large Hedge Funds in 2013 and won the award for CreditFlux Best Credit Multistrategy in 2014.

== Investments ==
Angelo Gordon operates three basic types of investment vehicles:

- Illiquid strategies — include a variety of investment strategies: distressed securities, private equity, triple net lease and real estate.
- Liquid strategies — credit opportunities, convertible arbitrage and risk arbitrage.
- Multi-strategy — takes advantage of attractive alternative investment opportunities from a range of the firm's disciplines.

== Additional references ==
- "Investors Sue Citigroup". The New York Times. August 27, 2004.
- "Mortgage Firm to File Bankruptcy." Reuters, December 7, 2007
- "Angelo Gordon moves into hedge-lite strategies." Reuters, June 13, 2007
- "Delta Financial selling big stake to Angelo Gordon." MarketWatch, Nov. 16, 2007
