= Roppongi Hills =

Development project in Tokyo, Japan

- 六本木ヒルズ

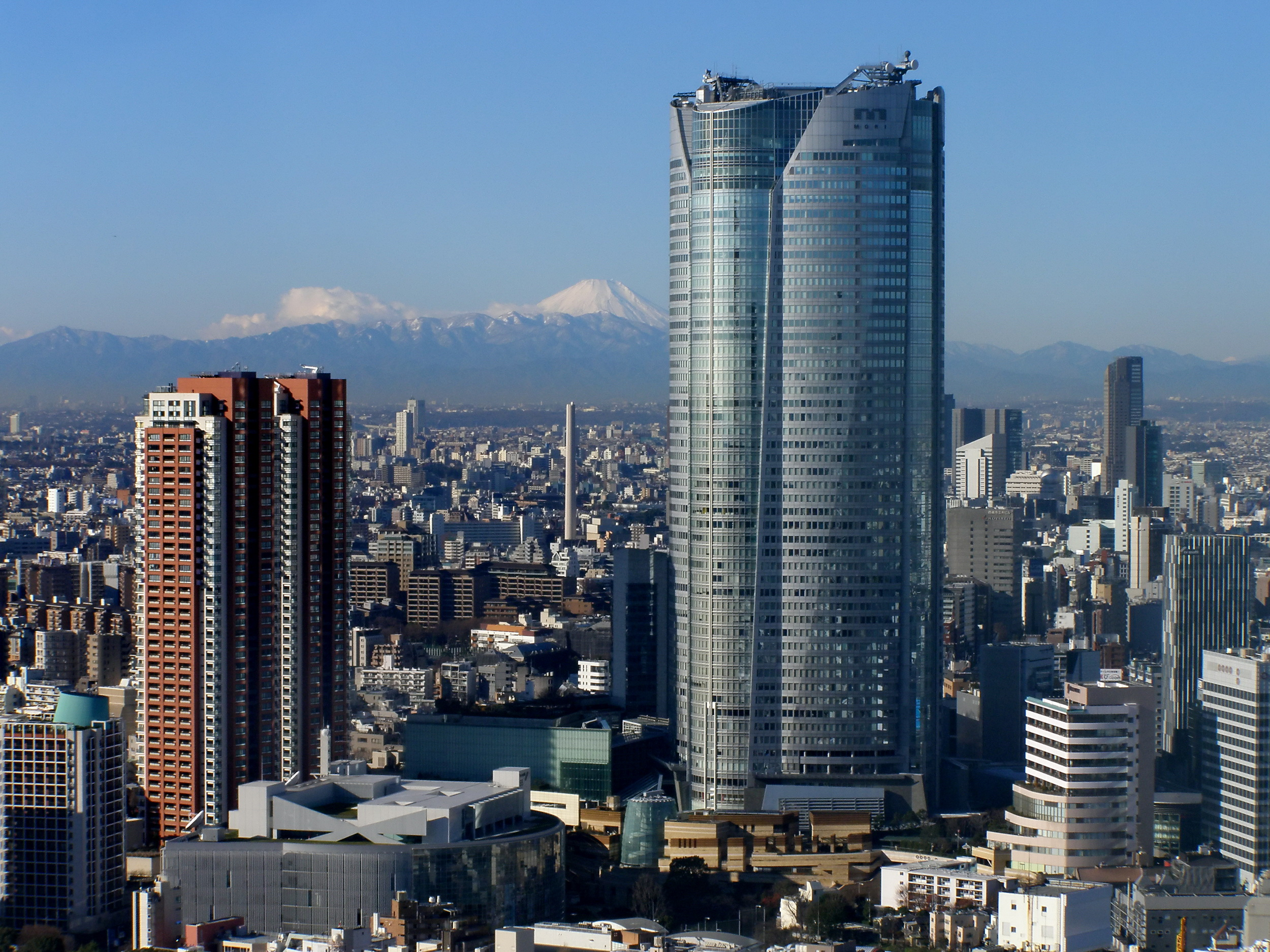
- The Roppongi Hills, with the Mori Tower (right) and the Residences B and C (left)
- Interactive map of the Roppongi Hills area

General information
- Location: Minato, Tokyo, Japan, Tokyo, Japan
- Coordinates: 35°39′36″N 139°43′48″E
- Construction started: March 2000; 26 years ago
- Completed: April 25, 2003; 23 years ago
- Cost: $4 billion
- Owner: Mori Building
- Operator: Mori Building

Height
- Height: Mori Tower: 238 m (780.84 ft)
- Observatory: Tokyo City View (52nd - 54th floor, Mori Tower)

Technical details
- Floor count: Mori Tower: 54; Residences B and C: 43; Grand Hyatt Tokyo: 21
- Floor area: 724,000 m^{2} (7,790,000 sq ft)
- Grounds: 11 hectares (27 acres)

Design and construction
- Architecture firm: General Master Plan and Architectural Design: Kohn Pedersen Fox
- Developer: Mori Building
- Main contractor: Mori Tower only: Obayashi Corporation

Other information
- Public transit: Roppongi Station; Roppongi Hills

Roppongi Hills (六本木ヒルズ, Roppongi Hiruzu) is a development project in Tokyo and one of Japan's largest integrated property developments, located in the Roppongi district of Minato, Tokyo.

Constructed by building tycoon Minoru Mori, the mega-complex incorporates office space, apartments, shops, restaurants, cafes, movie theatres, a museum, a hotel, a major TV studio, an outdoor amphitheatre, and a few parks. The centrepiece of the complex is the 54-story Roppongi Hills Mori Tower. Mori's stated vision was to build an integrated development where high-rise inner-urban communities allow people to live, work, play, and shop in proximity to eliminate commuting time, and has a total floor area of 724,000 m^{2} (7,790,000 sq ft). The company argued that this would increase leisure time, quality of life, and benefit Japan's national competitiveness. Seventeen years after the design's initial conception, the complex opened to the public on April 25, 2003. The architecture and use of space is documented in the book Six Strata: Roppongi Hills Redefined.

== Development ==
Roppongi Hills cost over $4 billion and was built on a 27-acre (109,000 m^{2}) site. The site amalgamated more than 400 smaller lots Mori acquired over 14 years. Construction within the complex began in March 2000 and was eventually completed on April 25, 2003.

=== Mori Tower ===
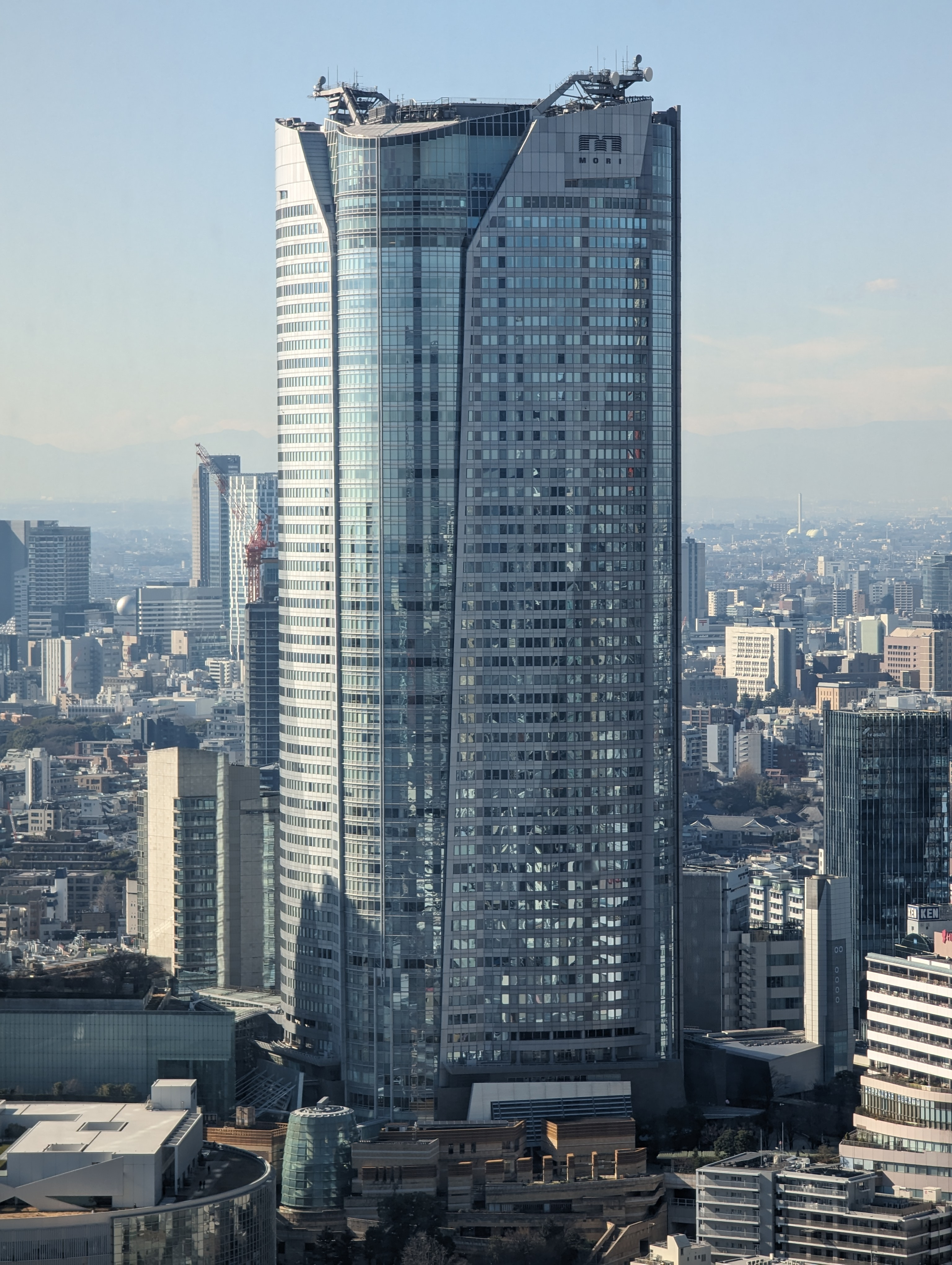
Mori Tower from Azabudai Hills Mori JP Tower

Mori Tower is a 54-story high-rise building designed by Kohn Pedersen Fox that houses an art museum, restaurants, cafes, clinics, stores, as well as the offices of Allen & Overy, Barclays Capital, Ferrari Japan, Goldman Sachs, J-WAVE, Konami, Time Inc., Chevron, BASF, Lenovo, Mercari, Baidu, GREE, BP, SAS Institute and Google. The Pokémon Company also has its headquarters in the Mori Tower. The first six levels of Mori Tower contain retail stores and restaurants. The top six floors house the Mori Art Museum and the Tokyo City View with panoramic views of the city. A new exit from Roppongi Station empties into a glass atrium filled with large television screens and escalators, as well as several shops and restaurants. The rest of the building is office space.

=== Other buildings ===
Around the Mori Tower are several smaller buildings predominantly occupied by shops and restaurants, a cinema complex and the Mori Garden. Behind the Mori Tower lies the Keyakizaka Street, famous for its night illumination of 1.2 million shining LEDs that begin in mid-November and run until Christmas Day. Keyakizaka also features cafes and luxury stores such as Louis Vuitton. Nearby are the four Roppongi Hills residence towers, with a total of 793 residential apartments.

Large open spaces have been built into the design of Roppongi Hills. About half of the area consists of gardens, pavilions, and other open spaces. The Mori Garden, an elaborate and authentic Japanese garden complete with a pond and trees is particularly popular. The garden is part of a lost mansion that housed members of the feudal Mōri clan.

On Roppongi Hills the exhibition of the United Buddy Bears was shown in 2005 for the first time in Japan. The exhibition was opened by the President of the Federal Republic of Germany, Horst Köhler, together with the Prime Minister of Japan, Junichiro Koizumi. According to the Mori-Group, project partners in Tokyo, they were able to count three million visitors over the six weeks of the exhibition.

The American School in Japan's Early Learning Center is housed in a residence building next to the Hills, the Roppongi Sakura-zaka Residence. A playground adjacent to the complex, near the school, is known in English as Robot Park and has robot-themed play equipment.

The headquarters of TV Asahi is also situated in Roppongi Hills, next to the Mori Garden. The building was designed by architect Fumihiko Maki.

== Criticism ==
Roppongi Hills Arena is a facility with large outdoor speakers, in proximity to older housing. Since the construction of the Roppongi Hills development, complaints of noise pollution from older residents have been ignored by Mori Building management, according to residents. The building most directly suffering from noise is on top of an embankment opposite the Arena. Residents say several residents have been forced out by the noise.

Henry Hilton of the Japan Today news aggregator website criticised the development when he argued:

Yet the truth is that the crowds are unlikely to return once they have been exhausted by the charade of inconvenient walkways that appear almost intentionally to confuse all but those with perfect map navigational skills. The whole maze is far from being user friendly—don't count on full protection from autumn showers or sudden gusts of wind generated by the buildings themselves.

== Financial issues ==
Mori Building has financed the project with $800 million equity and $1.3 billion in debt from a syndicate of banks led by the Development Bank of Japan. As a result, the company's overall debts are $5.6 billion, secured by billions more in assets.

Goldman Sachs & Co., the project's anchor tenant, attracted deep discounts in rental prices because of the large amount of space it occupies. Japan's sluggish economy, staff cuts by foreign companies, and the flow of new office space have put downward pressure on rents.

Because of eminent domain law in Japan, several past residents of the site that would be Roppongi Hills have been given residential units in the complex in return for their agreement to vacate their prior homes, so that their prior homes would be demolished and the land used for the development of Roppongi Hills.

== Gallery ==
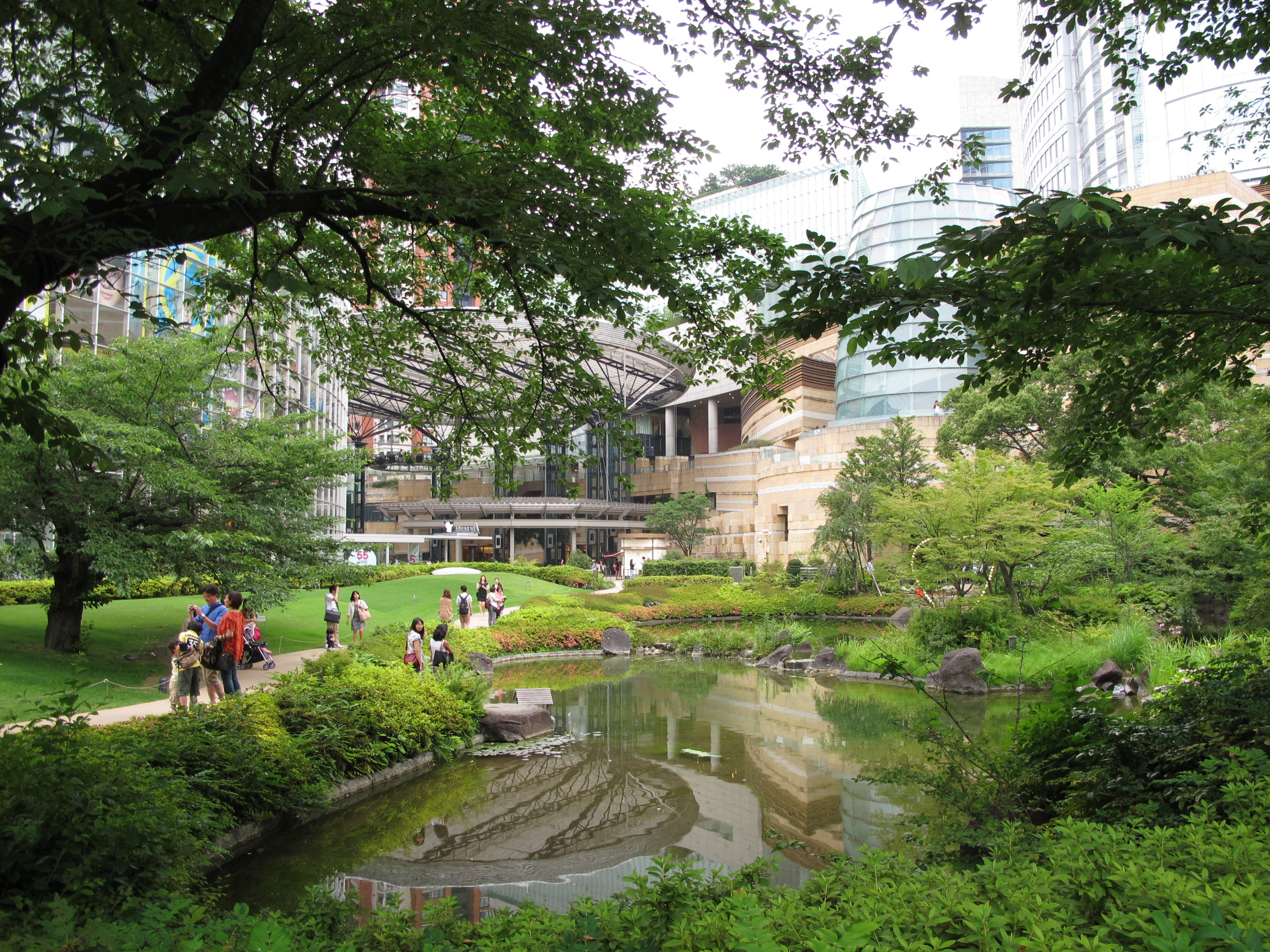
Roppongi Hills Mori Garden

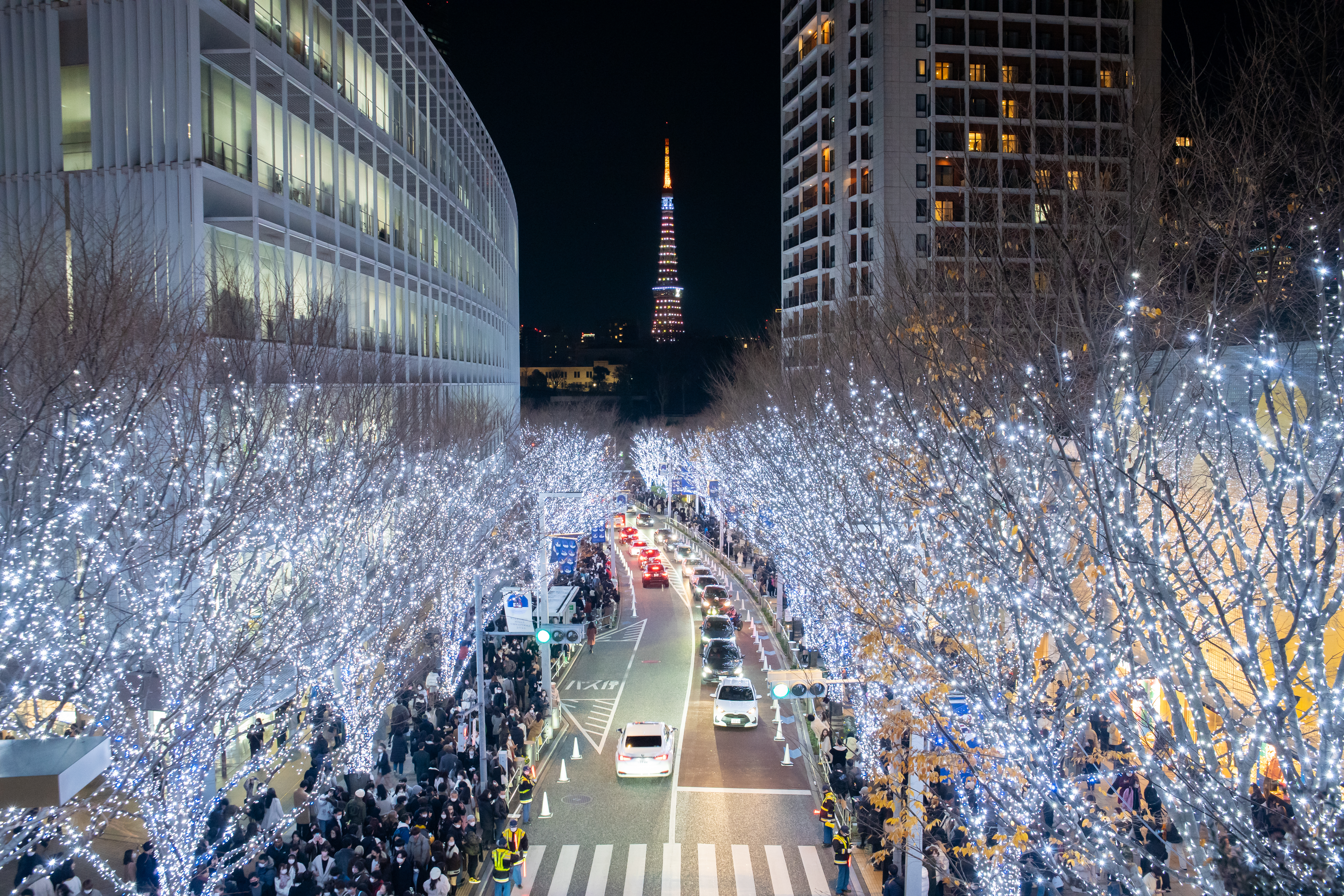
Keyakizaka Street illuminations

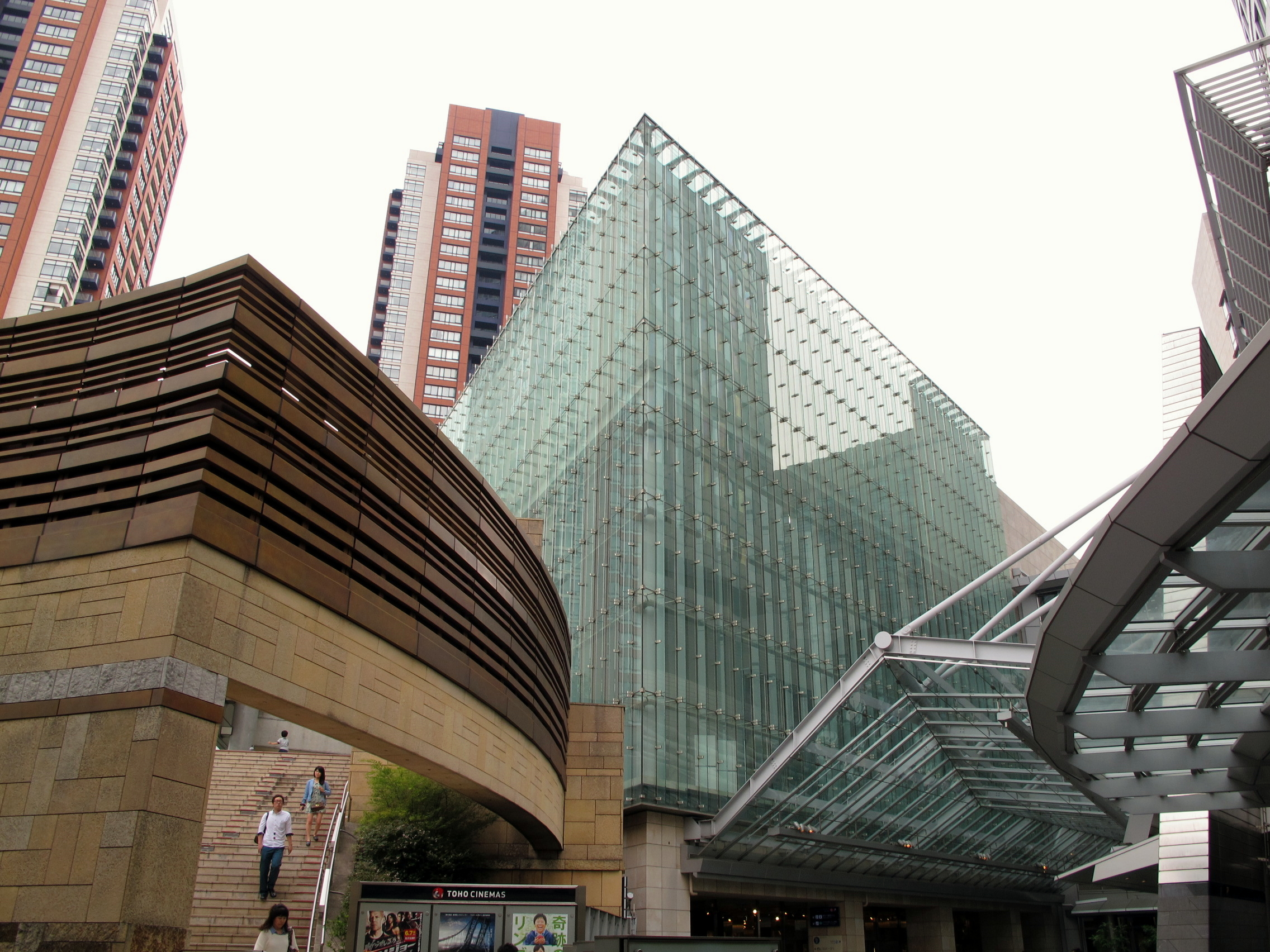
Toho Cinemas in Roppongi Hills

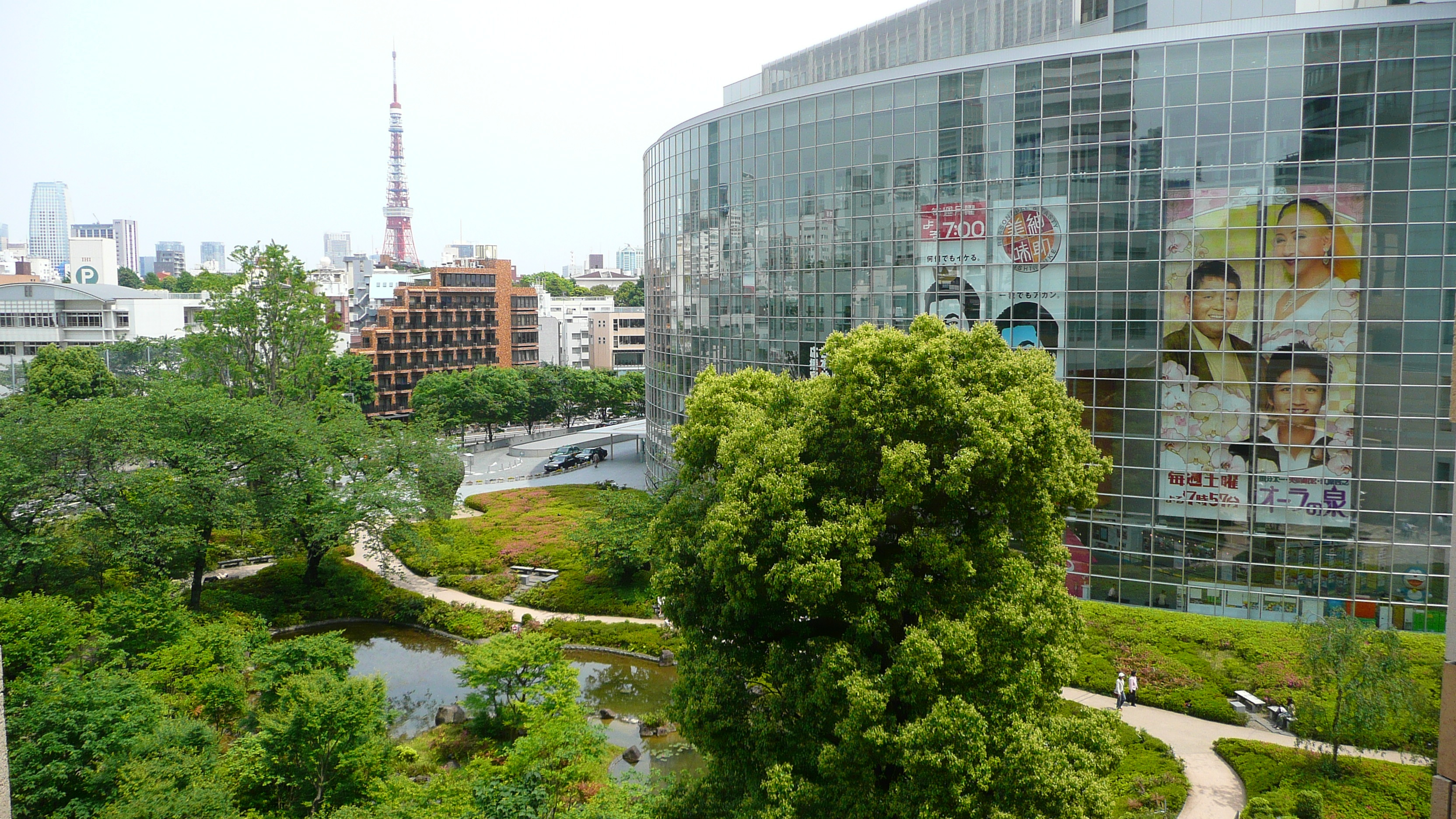
TV Asahi headquarters in Roppongi Hills

== See also ==
- Omotesando Hills, a similar (but smaller) development also built by Mori
- Jerde-associated architectural projects in Japan:
  - Canal City Hakata (Fukuoka)
  - Namba Parks (Osaka)
  - Riverwalk Kitakyūshū (Kitakyushu)
