= Tokyo Shiodome Building =

Coordinates: 35°39′47″N 139°45′40″E

- 東京汐留ビルディング
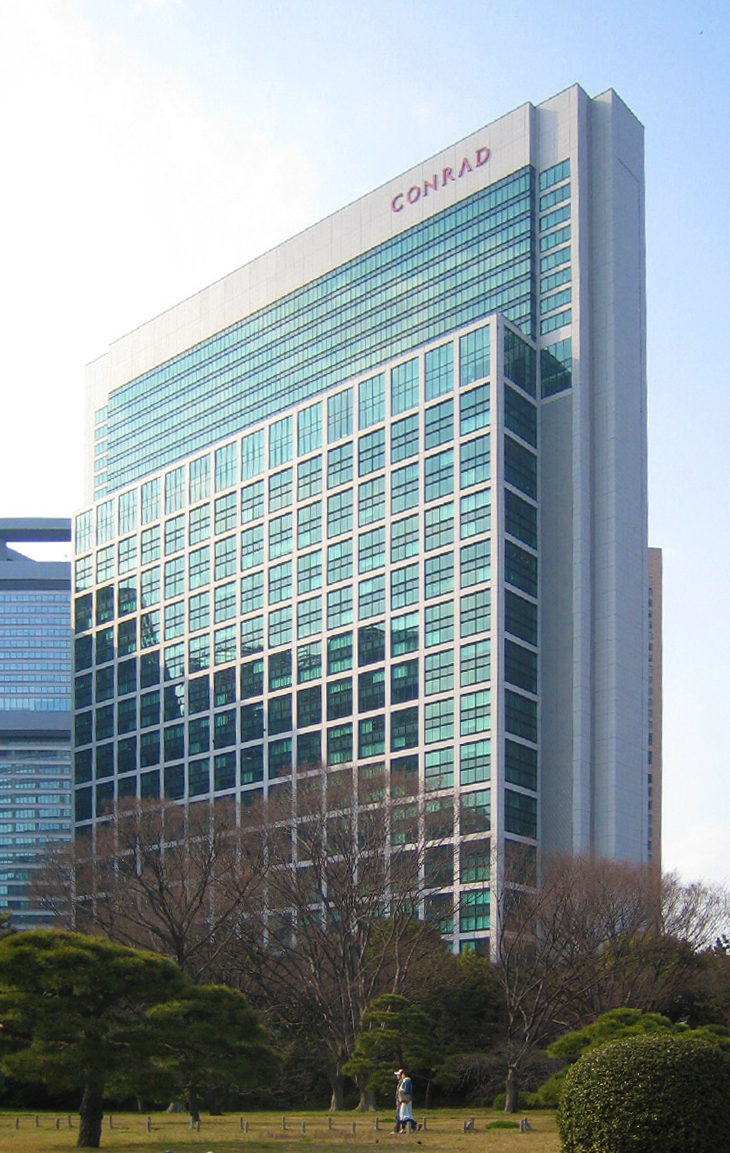

General information
- Location: Minato, Tokyo, Japan
- Completed: 2005

Height
- Height: 174 m (571 ft)

Technical details
- Floor count: 37

The Tokyo Shiodome Building (東京汐留ビルディング) is a building used for offices with a hotel on the top floors at Shiodome in Minato, Tokyo, Japan. It has a height of 174 metres with 37 floors. The building was constructed from 2002 to 2005 and is owned by Mori Trust and Sumitomo.

The office area of the building is occupied by SoftBank and its group companies, and serves as the headquarters for SoftBank, SoftBank BB, SoftBank Mobile, SoftBank Telecom and Willcom.

The 290-room Conrad Tokyo, occupying floors 28 to 37, opened on 1 July 2005.
