= Minoru Mori =

Japanese businessman (1934–2012)

- 森 稔
- Mori in 2006
- Born: August 24, 1934; Kyoto, Japan
- Died: March 8, 2012 (aged 77); Tokyo, Japan
- Education: University of Tokyo
- Occupation: Real estate tycoon
- Known for: "The World's Billionaires: #721 Minoru Mori". Forbes. March 3, 2010.
- Spouse: Married
- Children: 2 children
- Parent: Taikichiro Mori (father)
- Relatives: Akira Mori (brother)

Minoru Mori (森 稔, Mori Minoru; August 24, 1934 – March 8, 2012) was a Japanese real estate developer, considered to be one of Japan's most powerful and influential building tycoons. He joined the real estate business of his father, Taikichiro Mori, after graduating from the University of Tokyo and was president and CEO of Mori Building, of which he and his older brother Kei's (a university professor) families owned 100%. He owned 12.74% of Sunwood Corporation.

The family name is found on many real estate developments in Japan. Minoru and his brother Akira were listed on the Forbes list of the world's richest men. His largest project was the Roppongi Hills development in Tokyo, which opened in 2003. The Shanghai World Financial Center, once China's tallest building, was completed in 2008. Mori acknowledged the influence of Le Corbusier but believed he had surpassed the Swiss architect's urban designs, particularly in the Roppongi Hills project.

In 2006, Mori's last development, Omotesando Hills, opened near Harajuku station consisting of a set of ramped shopping floors.

In 2008, he was named Asia Businessman of the Year 2007 by Fortune magazine.

In 2009, he was honoured as an honorary Knight Commander of the Order of the British Empire (KBE) by Queen Elizabeth II. He died of heart failure in 2012. He was 77.

== Noteworthy developments ==
- Shanghai World Financial Center
- Roppongi Hills
- Mori Tower
- Ark Hills
- Atago Green Hills
- Holland Hills
- Omotesando Hills
- Roppongi First Building

Residential

- Akasaka Tameike Tower
- Ark Towers
- Wangdu Towers
- Ark Forest Terrace
- Roppongi First Plaza
- Nishi-Azabu Forest Plaza
- Moto-Azabu Hills

== See also ==
- Akira Mori
- Mori Art Museum
