= Mori Building Company =

Japanese property management firm

Mori Building Company, Limited
- Native name: 森ビル株式会社
- Romanized name: Moribiru kabushiki gaisha
- Company type: Private family-owned KK
- Industry: Real estate, development
- Founded: 1959
- Founder: Taikichiro Mori
- Headquarters: Mori Tower; 6-10-1 Roppongi, Minato; Tokyo, Japan, Roppongi, Minato, Tokyo, Japan
- Area served: Japan, China, Indonesia
- Key people: Shingo Tsuji (President and CEO)
- Services: Real estate development, Office leasing
- Owner: Mori family (95.94%)
- Number of employees: 1,343
- Website: mori.co.jp

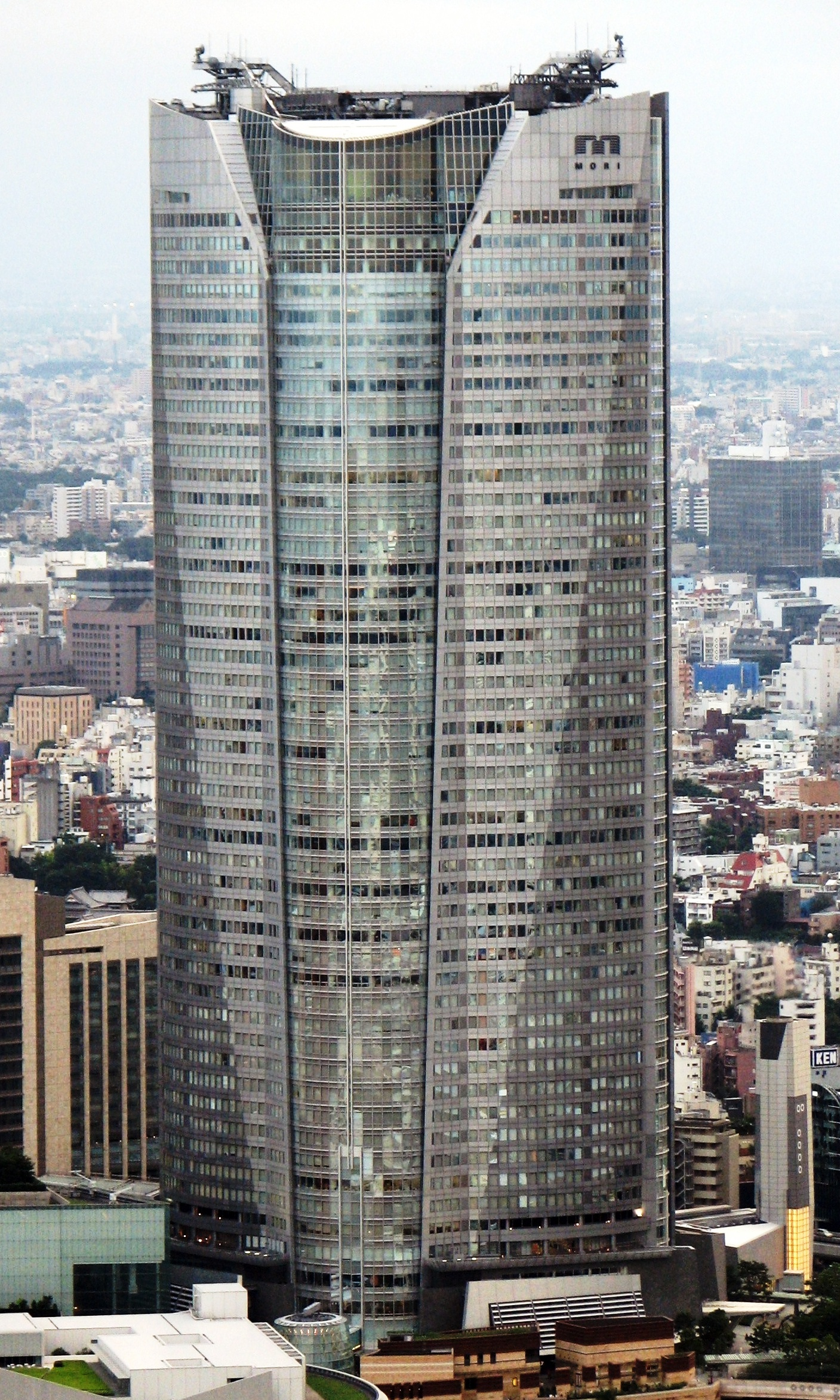
Roppongi Hills Mori Tower, flagship Tokyo development and company headquarters

Mori Building Company, Limited (森ビル株式会社, Mori Biru kabushiki gaisha) is a Japanese family-owned property management firm. As of 2015, its president and CEO is Shingo Tsuji. Its headquarters are in the Roppongi Hills Mori Tower in Roppongi, Minato, Tokyo.

Mori Building has been managing office building leases since 1955. Its focus has been in Minato, Tokyo. As of 2011, it manages 107 office facilities in Japan and China, with a total of 1,160,000 m^{2} (12,500,000 sq ft) of space.

Taikichiro Mori, the founder, quit his job as an economics professor and entered the real estate business. He became the richest man in the world in 1992 with the net worth of $13 billion U.S. dollars. At the time his net worth was double that of Bill Gates and $3 billion more than Yoshiaki Tsutsumi. Taikichiro Mori died of heart failure on January 30, 1993, at the age of 88.

Mori's practice of building isolating towers over historically significant districts in Tokyo has been criticized by prominent architects.

== Completed projects ==
- Ark Hills (1986)
- Atago Green Hills (2001)
- Roppongi Hills (2003)
- Holland Hills (2005)
- Omotesando Hills (2006)
- Shanghai World Financial Center (2008)
- Ark Hills Sengokuyama Mori Tower (2012)
- Toranomon Hills (2014)
- Jakarta Mori Tower (2022)
- Azabudai Hills (2023)

== See also ==
- Minoru Mori
