= Verkhnyaya Poltavka =

Verkhnyaya Poltavka Верхняя Полтавка
- Selo
- Location within Amur Oblast Location within Russia
- Coordinates: 49°53′N 128°12′E
- Country: Russia
- Region: Amur Oblast
- District: Konstantinovsky District
- Time zone: UTC+9:00

Verkhnyaya Poltavka (Russian: Верхняя Полтавка) is a rural locality (a selo) in Verkhnepoltavsky Selsoviet of Konstantinovsky District, Amur Oblast, Russia. The population was 635 as of 2018. There are 9 streets.

== Geography ==
Verkhnyaya Poltavka is located 44 km north of Konstantinovka (the district's administrative centre) by road. Srednyaya Poltavka is the nearest rural locality.
