= Verkhny Urtuy =

Verkhny Urtuy Верхний Уртуй
- Selo
- Location within Amur Oblast Location within Russia
- Coordinates: 49°51′N 127°59′E
- Country: Russia
- Region: Amur Oblast
- District: Konstantinovsky District
- Time zone: UTC+9:00

Verkhny Urtuy (Russian: Верхний Уртуй) is a rural locality (a selo) in Verkhneurtuysky Selsoviet of Konstantinovsky District, Amur Oblast, Russia. The population was 421 as of 2018. There are 6 streets.

== Geography ==
Verkhny Urtuy is located 29 km north of Konstantinovka (the district's administrative centre) by road. Novotroitskoye is the nearest rural locality.
