= Kanchazu Island incident =

1937 Soviet–Japanese border clash

- Part of the Soviet–Japanese border conflicts
Date	19–30 June 1937
Location	Amur River, downstream of Konstantinovka, Amur Oblast; 49°32′0″N 128°15′0″E
Result	Japanese victory
Territorial changes	Japanese forces retake Kanchazu Island

Belligerents
Soviet Union	Japan; Manchukuo

Commanders and leaders
Unknown	Mihara Kanae

Units involved
Amur Military Flotilla; Soviet Border Troops units	1st Division; 3rd District Army Qiqihar units, Manchukuo Imperial Army

Strength
3 river armoured motor gunboats (Note: Three Model 1916 river armoured motor gunboats (Soviet designation: речные бронекатера типа «К», 'K-class river armoured motor gunboats'): No. 72 and No. 74 from the Amur Military Flotilla, and No. 308 from the NKVD Maritime Border Guard.)	Unknown

Casualties and losses
37 KIA (Japanese reports); 6 KIA, 3 WIA (Soviet reports) (Note: Russian sources state that only six Soviet servicemen perished: five in action, and one of the four wounded—a Red Fleet man—later succumbed to his wounds.); 1 river armoured motor gunboat sunk; 2 river armoured motor gunboats damaged	None

The Kanchazu Island incident (乾岔子島事件, Kanchazutō jiken) occurred in late June 1937 on the Amur River, at the Soviet–Manchukuo border.

== Background ==
Kanchazu (also spelled Kanchatzu, Japanese: 乾岔子島; Russian: Сычевский, romanized: Sychevsky, also known by its unofficial name Сеннуха, Sennukha) is an unoccupied island of about eight by six kilometres (5.0 by 3.7 mi) located in the Amur River opposite Novopetrovka, some 100 km (62 mi) downstream from Blagoveshchensk.

Formally, the islands downstream from Konstantinovka—including Kanchazu—located between the thalweg and the right (Manchurian) bank, at the time belonged to the Soviet Union under the 1860 Convention of Peking between the Qing and Russian Empires. However, claims to these islands were disputed by the Manchukuo government, which considered this agreement to be unequal.

== Events ==
On June 19, two Soviet motorboats crossed the center line of the river, unloaded 20 troops, and occupied Kanchazu Island.

The next day, 17 Manchukuo police and soldiers were sent to investigate the border intrusion. Soviet troops, numbering around 40 men, were now entrenched on Kanchazu Island and building fortifications. The Manchurian patrol was driven back by Soviet soldiers.

On 29 June, a planned operation by the Japanese Kwantung Army's 1st Division headquarters was approved for a night attack on Kanchazu for the expulsion of Soviet troops from the island. The operation was ultimately delayed and rescheduled for the next day.

On the morning of June 30, Japanese soldiers from the 49th Regiment of the 1st Division led by Lieutenant Colonel Mihara Kanae launched a prolonged attack against the Soviets. The attack began with the use of two (or three, according to Russian sources) horse-drawn 37 mm artillery pieces. The Japanese soldiers proceeded to set up hastily improvised firing sites, and they loaded their guns with both high-explosive and armor-piercing shells. The shelling sank the leading river armoured motor gunboat (No. 72), killed five crew members including the commanding officer, and crippled and drove off the second and third (No. 74 and No. 308). During the confrontation, the Soviets did not return fire, which resulted in no Japanese casualties.

Soviet crewmen of the first sunken river armoured motor gunboat were left stranded and forced to swim to the northern side of the river bank into Soviet territory. Many casualties were inflicted when Japanese troops opened fire on the swimming crewmen with a barrage of machine guns. The Japanese estimated total Soviet casualties at 37. The island was abandoned by the Soviets and was later reclaimed by Japanese troops.

== Aftermath ==
Shigemitsu Mamoru, the Japanese ambassador to the Soviet Union, met with Soviet Commissar of Foreign Affairs Maxim Litvinov on June 29 to discuss the turn of events. The Soviets insisted the Amur Islands belonged to them from an 1860 agreement and their placement on a Soviet map. During negotiations, the Soviets, however, agreed to pull back their forces from the Amur River to defuse the situation. Apparently, the Soviets were more concerned with events unfolding in Northern China and Europe as well as internal strife. In the aftermath, seven Soviet gunboats appeared sometime in July, but the Japanese took no action.

Eventually, as part of the agreement, the Soviets were allowed to salvage the sunken gunboat, which was accomplished between October 22 to 29 in the same year.

== Sources ==
- Coox, Alvin D. (1990). Nomonhan: Japan Against Russia, 1939. Stanford, Calif.: Stanford University Press. ISBN 0-8047-1835-0. ISBN 978-0-8047-1835-6.
- Sutormin, Vladimir A. (2015). Благовещенский (Амурский) инцидент 1937 года [The 1937 Blagoveshchensk (Amur) Incident]. Arsenal-Kollektsiya Арсенал-Коллекция (in Russian). No. 1 #31. Moscow: Mir Modeley Ltd. pp. 46–53. ISSN 2306-6695.
