= Voykovo =

Voykovo Войково
- Selo
- Location within Amur Oblast Location within Russia
- Coordinates: 49°36′N 128°11′E
- Country: Russia
- Region: Amur Oblast
- District: Konstantinovsky District
- Time zone: UTC+9:00

Voykovo (Russian: Войково) is a rural locality (a selo) in Voykovsky Selsoviet of Konstantinovsky District, Amur Oblast, Russia. The population was 192 as of 2018. It consists of 6 streets.

== Geography ==
Voykovo is located 19 km east of Konstantinovka (the district's administrative centre) by road. Novopetrovka is the nearest rural locality.
