= Akasaka Press Center =

United States Army facility in Japan

- 赤坂プレスセンター
- Minato, Tokyo, Japan
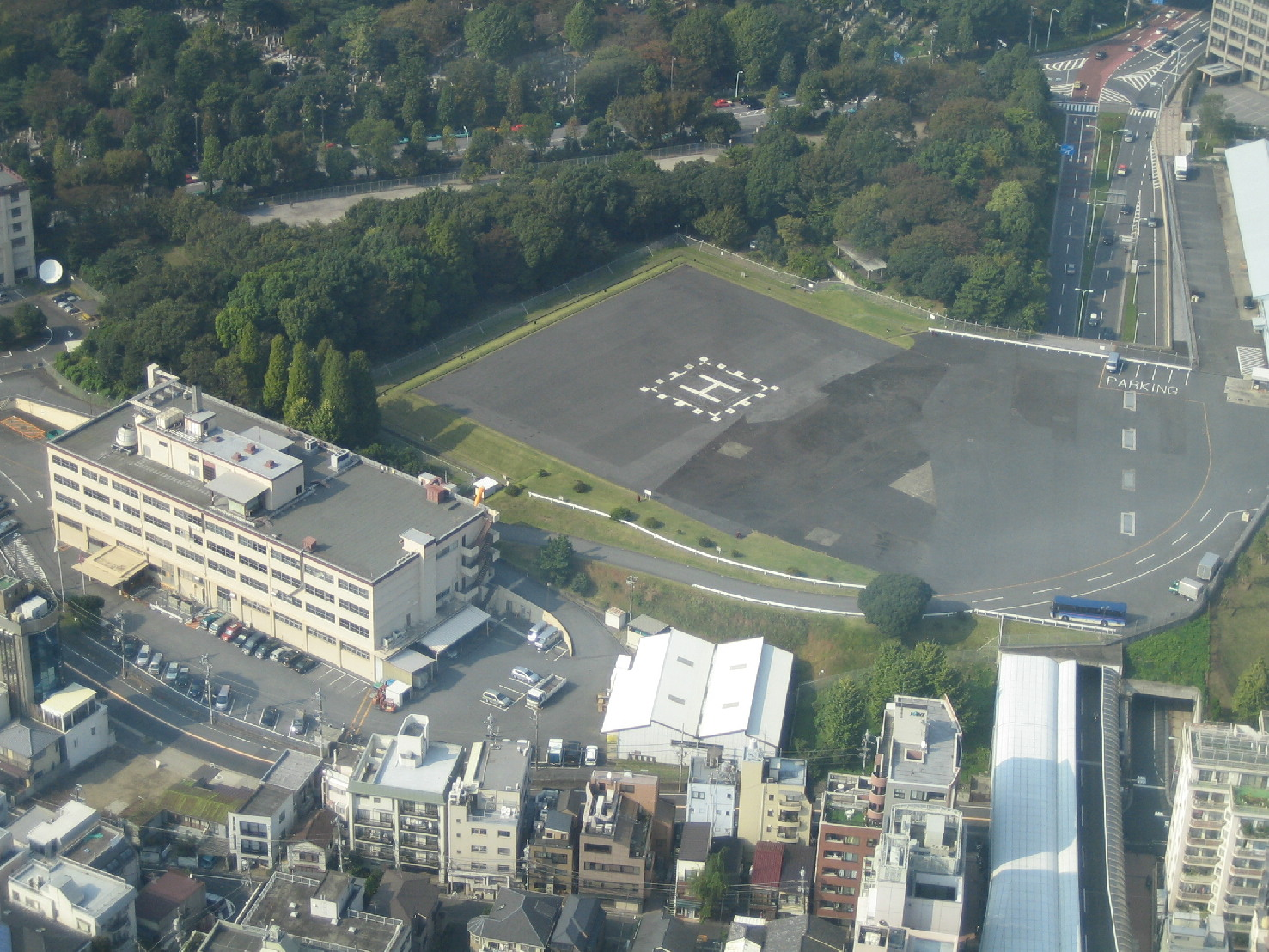
- Main building and helipad as viewed from Roppongi Hills (part of Hardy Barracks building visible to left)

Site information
- Code: HDY
- Controlled by: United States Army

Location
- Coordinates: 35°39′48″N 139°43′32″E
- Area: 26,937 m2

Garrison information
- Garrison: United States Army Garrison Japan

Airfield information
- Identifiers: ICAO: RJ01
- Elevation: 97 feet (30 m) AMSL

Akasaka Press Center (also known as Hardy Barracks and Azabu Heliport) is a facility of the United States Army, Japan located in the Roppongi area of Minato, Tokyo.

The facility occupies 3.1 hectares of land in central Tokyo. It houses the Tokyo offices of Stars and Stripes, the Tokyo division of the Office of Naval Research, and the Hardy Barracks, an accommodation facility for military personnel. The base also houses a helipad and gasoline pump.

== History ==
The site was previously the base of the 3rd Infantry Regiment, 1st Division, Imperial Japanese Army, one of the units involved in the February 26 Incident of 1936. The unit was sent to Manchuria later that year, and the site then housed units of the Imperial Guard through the end of World War II. The United States military took over the entire site in 1945.

A large portion of the facility was returned to Japan in 1962 and used by the University of Tokyo Institute of Industrial Science until 2001; this area is now occupied by The National Art Center, Tokyo and the National Graduate Institute for Policy Studies.

There has been organized local opposition to the facility since 1967, and both the Tokyo metropolitan assembly and Minato municipal assembly have unanimously resolved to request that the facility be removed.

== Facility ==
The facility is located near other US government installations in central Tokyo including the United States Embassy (2.5 km to the northeast) and the New Sanno Hotel (2.2 km to the south).

The heliport is periodically used by civilian helicopters for official purposes such as medical evacuation of patients from the Ogasawara Islands under a 2008 agreement between the US military and Tokyo metropolitan government. Michael Jackson boarded a Black Hawk helicopter from the site in March 2007.

=== Civilian complaints ===
The United States Army has officially stated that the helipad is meant to be used during emergency situations in Tokyo, while the mayor of Minato City has stated that "we have been told in response to inquiries that the details of how the base is used cannot be released publicly."

Japanese media outlets have reported frequently about low-level flights.

== Gallery ==
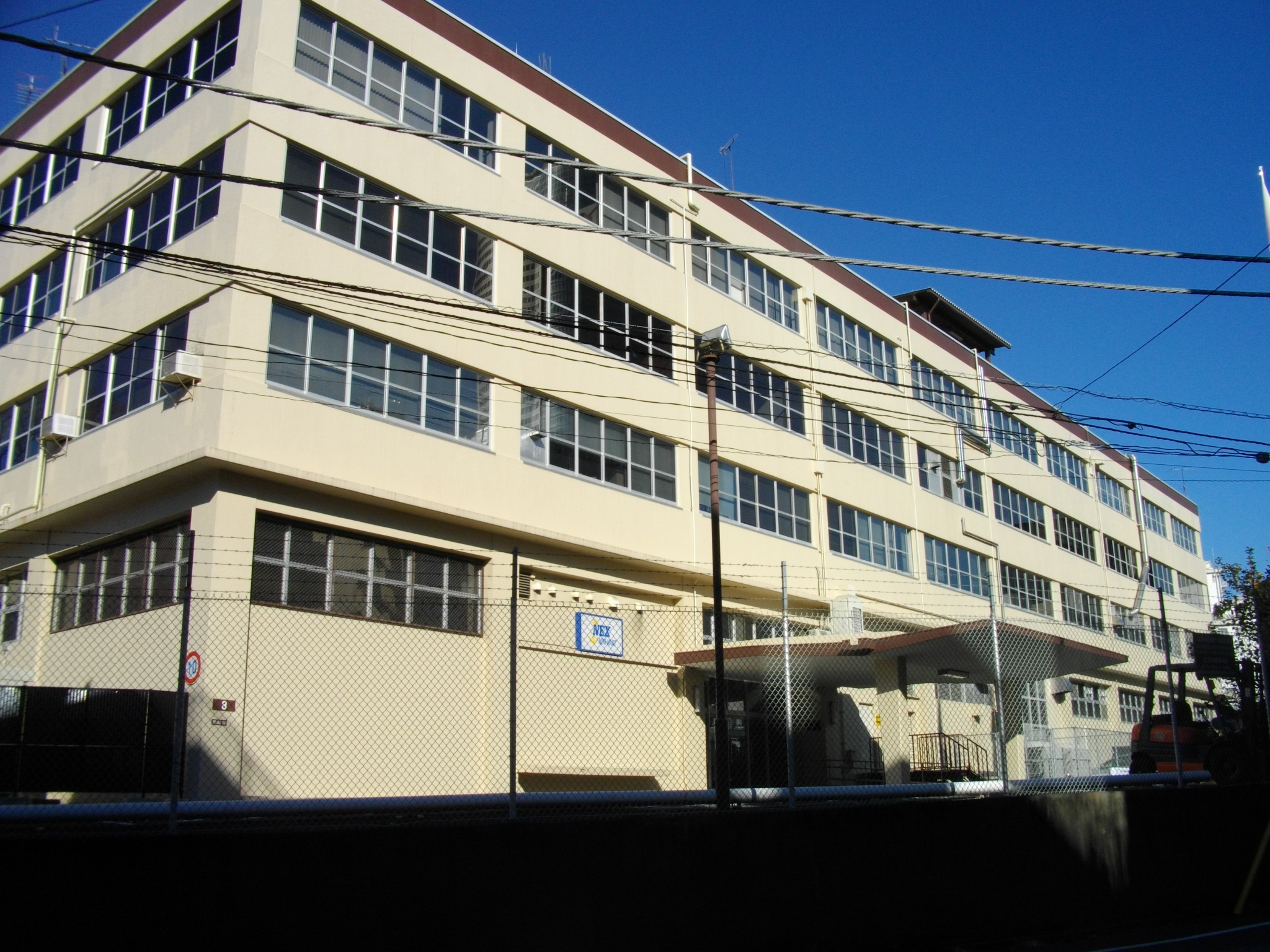
Main building

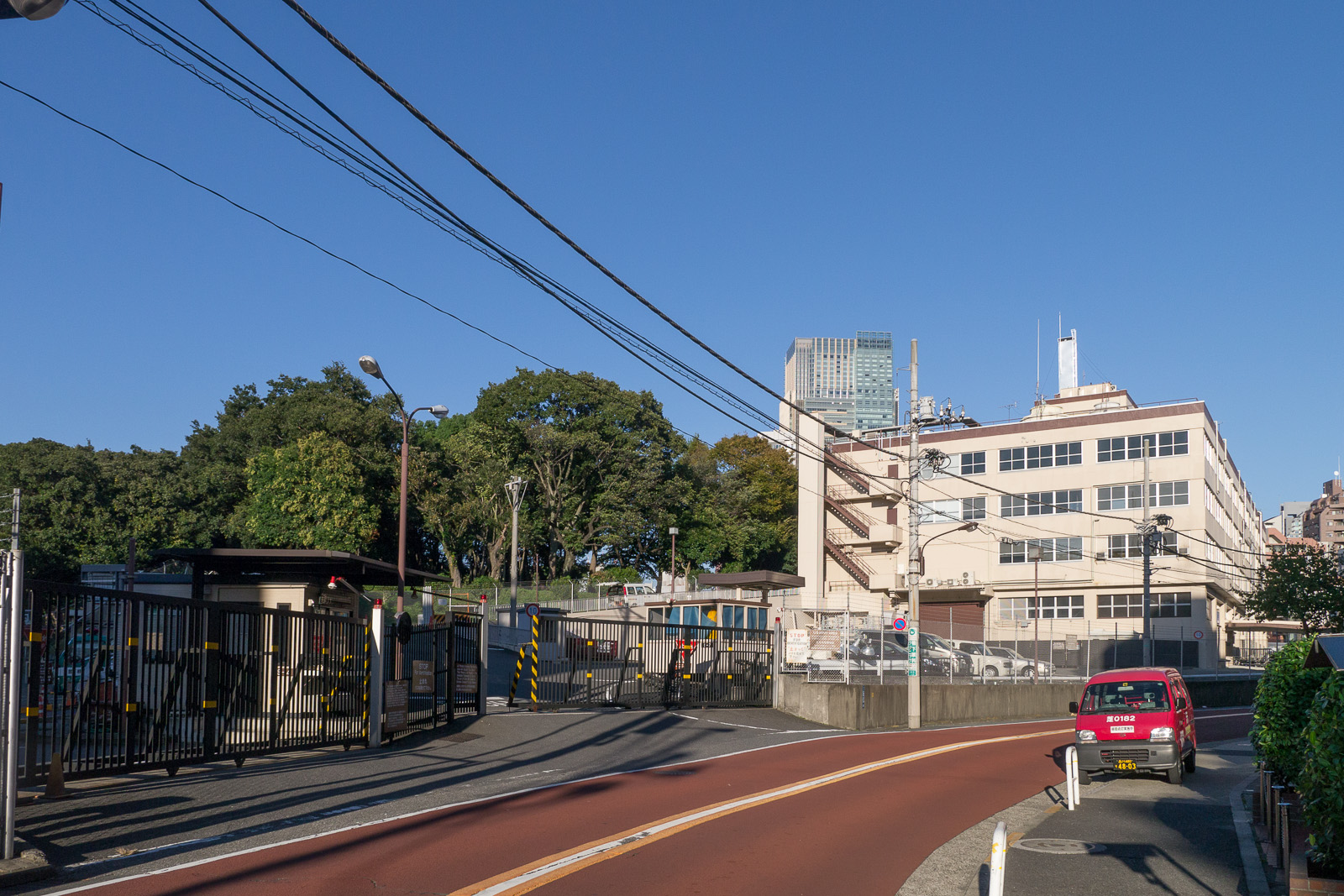
Main entrance viewed from street

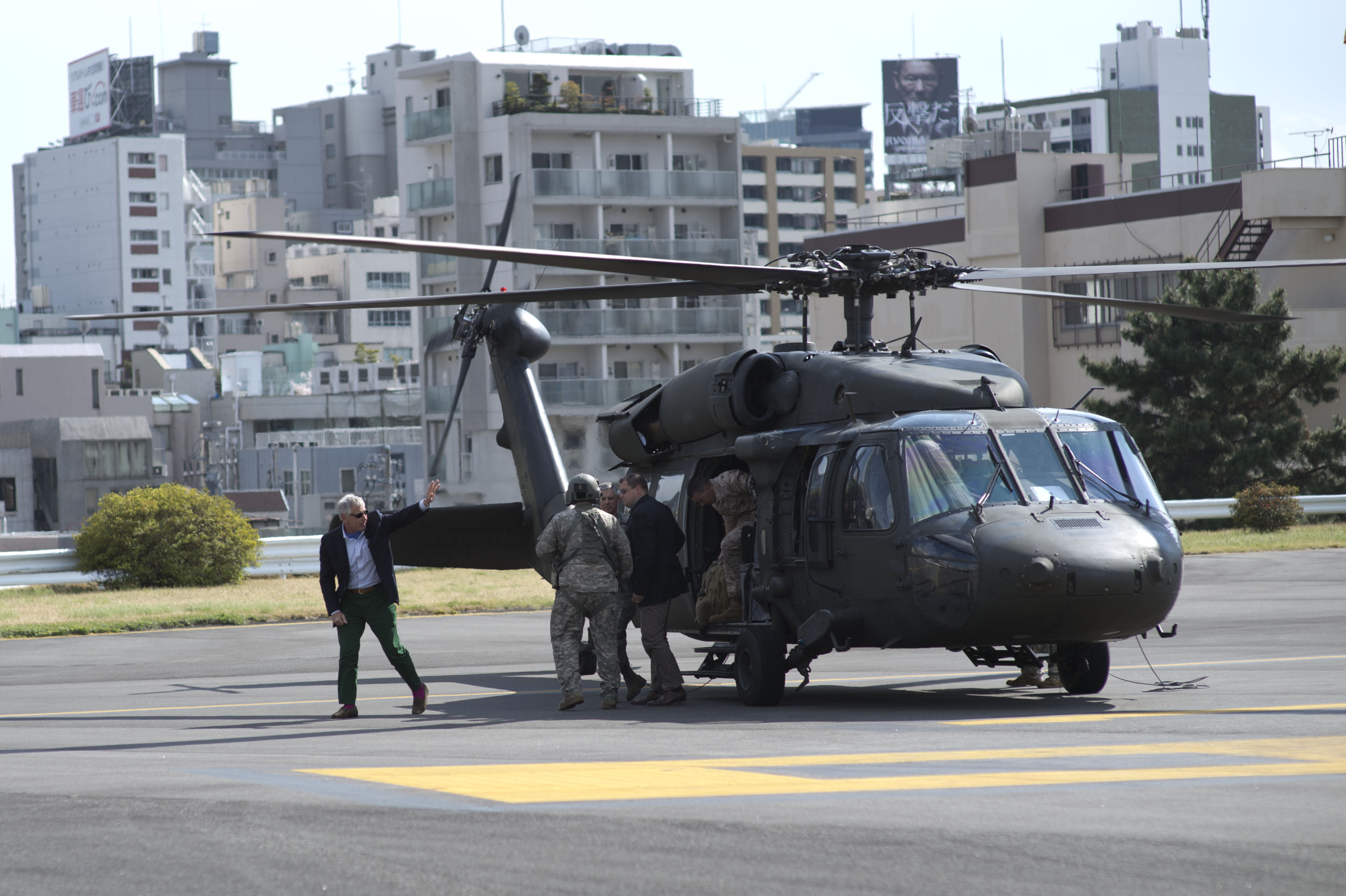
U.S. Defense Secretary Chuck Hagel arriving at the base in a UH-60 Black Hawk, 2014

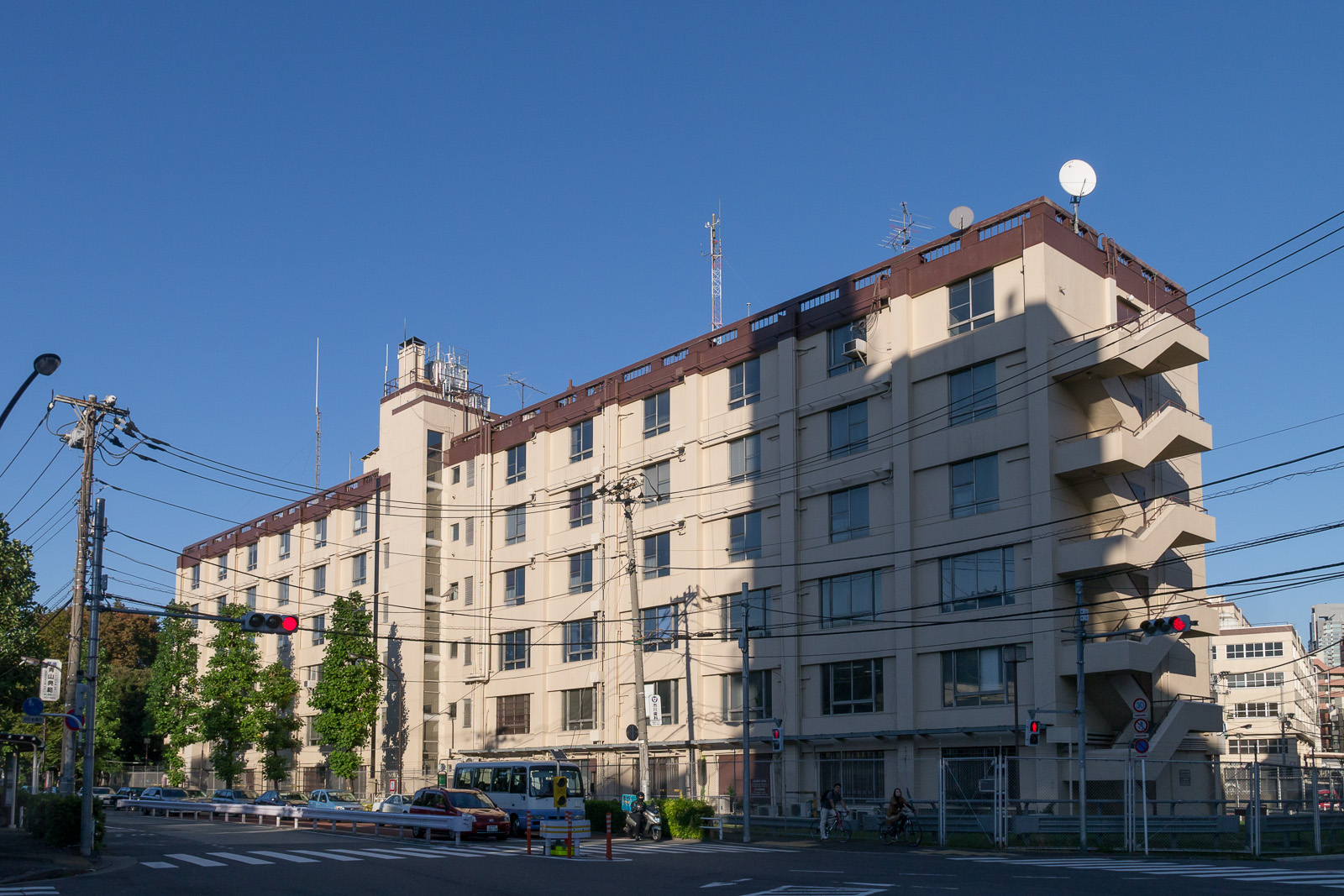
Hardy Barracks building viewed from street
