= Zenkovka =

Zenkovka Зеньковка
- Selo
- Location within Amur Oblast Location within Russia
- Coordinates: 49°54′N 128°22′E
- Country: Russia
- Region: Amur Oblast
- District: Konstantinovsky District
- Time zone: UTC+9:00

Zenkovka (Russian: Зеньковка) is a rural locality (a selo) in Zenkovsky Selsoviet of Konstantinovsky District, Amur Oblast, Russia. The population was 438 as of 2018. There are 6 streets.

== Geography ==
Zenkovka is located 56 km northeast of Konstantinovka (the district's administrative centre) by road. Zolotonozhka is the nearest rural locality.
