= Novopetrovka, Konstantinovsky District, Amur Oblast =

Novopetrovka Новопетровка
- Selo
- Location within Amur Oblast Location within Russia
- Coordinates: 49°34′N 128°15′E
- Country: Russia
- Region: Amur Oblast
- District: Konstantinovsky District
- Time zone: UTC+9:00

Novopetrovka (Russian: Новопетровка) is a rural locality (a selo) in Krestovozdvizhensky Selsoviet of Konstantinovsky District, Amur Oblast, Russia. The population was 531 as of 2018. There are 6 streets.

== Geography ==
Novopetrovka is located on the left bank of the Amur River, 27 km east of Konstantinovka (the district's administrative centre) by road. Voykovo is the nearest rural locality.
