= Zenovka =

Zenovka (Russian: Зеновка) is a Russian surname. Notable people with the surname include:

- Eduard Zenovka (born 1969), Soviet modern pentathlete
- Irina Zenovka (born 1972), Russian choreographer of rhythmic gymnastics, wife of Eduard

== See also ==
- Zenkovka
