= TV Asahi =

Japanese television station

TV Asahi Holdings Corporation

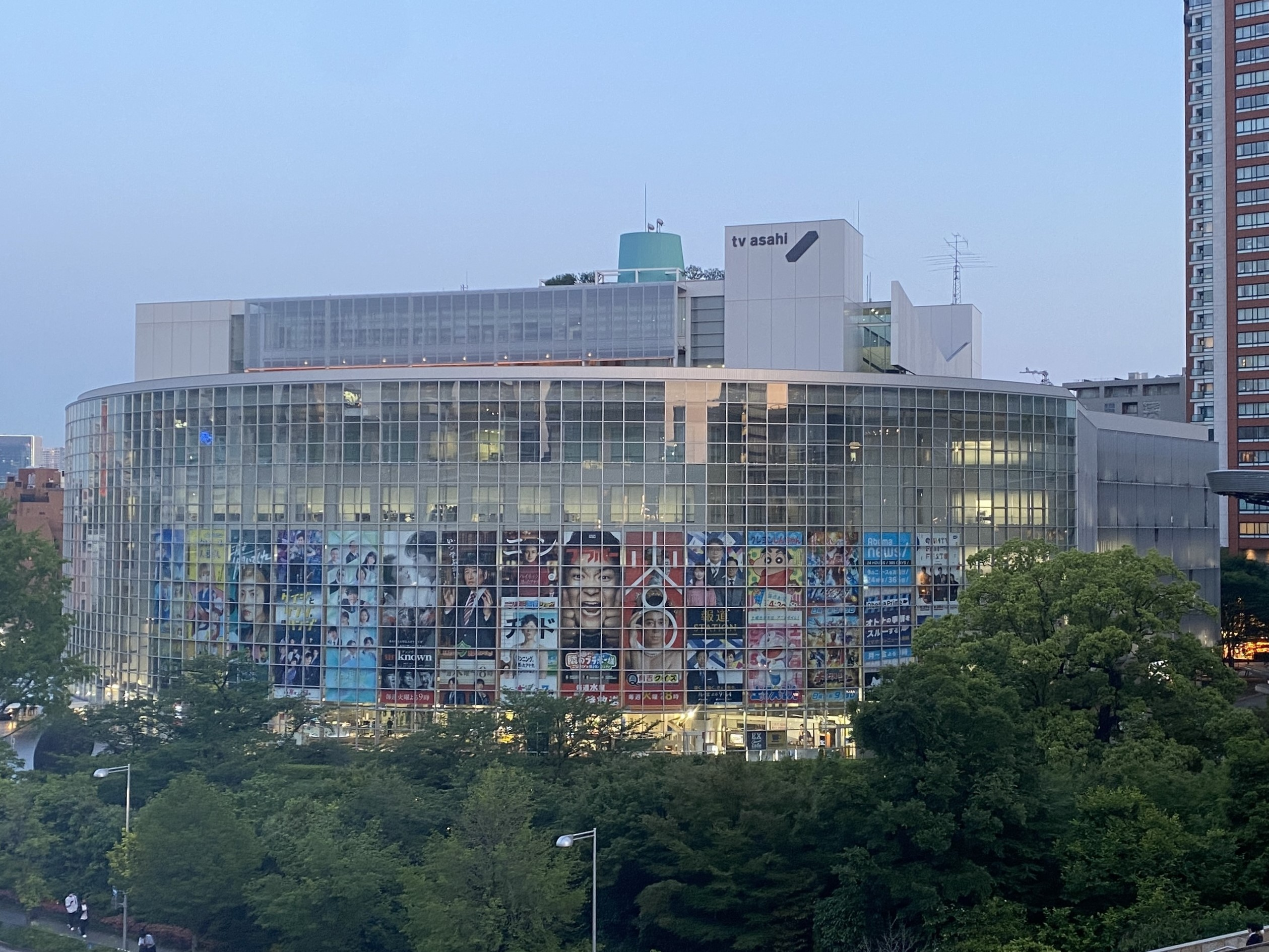
- The headquarters of TV Asahi is located in Roppongi Hills in Minato, Tokyo.
- Native name: 株式会社テレビ朝日ホールディングス
- Romanized name: Kabushiki-gaisha Terebi Asahi Hōrudingusu
- Formerly: Nippon Educational Television Co., Ltd. (1957–1977); Asahi National Broadcasting Co., Ltd. (1977–2003); TV Asahi Corporation (2003–2014)
- Type: Public
- Traded as: TYO: 9409
- ISIN: JP3429000007
- Industry: Media
- Founded: November 1, 1957; 69 years ago
- Headquarters: 6-9-1 Roppongi, Minato, Tokyo, Japan
- Area served: Worldwide, with a focus in Japan
- Key people: Hiroshi Hayakawa; (chairman and CEO); Hiroshi Shinozuka; (president); Masaya Fujinoki; (Senior Executive Director); Toru Takeda; (Senior Executive Director)
- Services: Television broadcasting
- Revenue: ▲JP¥324.06 billion (FY 2025); JP¥293,638 million (FY 2020)
- Operating income: ▲ *JP¥24.0 billion (FY 2025); JP¥12,565 million (FY 2020)
- Net income: ▲JP¥25.82 billion (FY 2025); JP¥26,398 million (FY 2020)
- Total assets: ▲; JP¥473,739 million (FY 2021); JP¥447,549 million (FY 2020)
- Total equity: ▲JP¥376,105 million (FY 2021); JP¥352,518 million (FY 2020)
- Owner: The Asahi Shimbun Company (24.73%); Toei (17.5%); CyberAgent (8%); Murayama family (co-owner of Asahi Shimbun; 5% through Kosetsu Museum of Art); Mizuho Trust & Banking (4.01% through Trust & Custody Services Bank); KBC Group Holdings (3.2%); Recruit Holdings (1.51%); State Street BTC of Japan (2.02%); The Asahi Shimbun Foundation (2%); Northern Trust (1.92%); The Master Trust Bank of Japan (3.88%); Asahi Broadcasting Group Holdings (1.48%); Dentsu Group (1.31%); ANA Holdings (0.20%)
- Number of employees: ▼5,229 (FY 2021); 5,332 (FY 2020)
- Parent: The Asahi Shimbun (24.73%)
- Subsidiaries: TV Asahi Corporation; BS Asahi Corporation; CS One Ten Corporation; New Japan Pro-Wrestling (46.3%)
- Website: tv-asahihd.co.jp
- Footnotes; Non-financial data from Corporate Profile. Financial data listed here are from the archive copy of TV Asahi Holdings' 2021 Financial Report

JOEX-DTV
- Logo used since 2003
- Kantō region; Japan
- City: Tokyo
- Channels: Digital: 24 (UHF); Virtual: 5
- Branding: TV Asahi

Programming
- Language: Japanese
- Affiliations: All-Nippon News Network

Ownership
- Owner: TV Asahi Corporation

History
- First air date: February 1, 1959; 67 years ago
- Former call signs: JOEX-TV (1959–2011)
- Former names: NET (1959–1977)
- Former channel numbers: Analog: 10 (VHF, 1959–2011)
- Call sign meaning: E for Educational, from original licensee name

Technical information
- Licensing authority: MIC
- Power: 10 kW
- ERP: 68 kW
- Transmitter coordinates: 35°39′31″N 139°44′44″E

Links
- Website: www.tv-asahi.co.jp

Corporate information
- Native name: 株式会社テレビ朝日
- Romanized name: Kabushiki-gaisha Terebi Asahi
- Type: Kabushiki gaisha
- Industry: Media
- Founded: October 15, 2013
- Headquarters: 6-9-1 Roppongi, Minato, Tokyo, Japan
- Area served: Worldwide, with a focus in Japan
- Key people: Hiroshi Hayakawa (Chairman and CEO); Hiroshi Shinozuka (President and Representative Director)
- Services: Television broadcasting
- Revenue: ▲¥267,928 million (2014)
- Operating income: ▲¥267,928 million (2014)
- Net income: ▲¥11,678 (2014)
- Total assets: ▲¥317,239 million (2014)
- Number of employees: 4,021 (as of March 31, 2014)
- Parent: TV Asahi Holdings Corporation
- Subsidiaries: TV Asahi ASK Co., Ltd. Shin-Ei Animation; TV Asahi Video Co., Ltd. NJPW World; Telasa (50%); TV Asahi Global Co., Ltd. TV Asahi America; TV Asahi Create; TV Asahi Productions; Japan Cable Television; CS 110 Co., Ltd. Flex Co., Ltd. TV Asahi Music Co., Ltd. TV Asahi Service Co., Ltd. Trust Network
- Website: company.tv-asahi.co.jp/e/

JOEX-DTV (channel 5), branded as TV Asahi (Japanese: テレビ朝日, Hepburn: Terebi Asahi; also stylized as TV-Asahi on copyrights and better known as Tele Asa (テレ朝)), is a Japanese television station serving the Kanto region as the flagship station of the All-Nippon News Network. It is owned-and-operated by the TV Asahi Corporation (Note: 株式会社テレビ朝日, Kabushiki gaisha Terebi Asahi), a wholly-owned subsidiary of TV Asahi Holdings Corporation (Note: 株式会社テレビ朝日ホールディングス, Kabushiki gaisha Terebi Asahi Hōrudingusu), itself controlled by The Asahi Shimbun Company. Its studios are located in Roppongi, Minato, Tokyo.

== History ==
=== Pre-launch ===
After NHK General TV, NTV, and Radio Tokyo Television were launched in 1953 and 1955, TV has become an important medium in Japan. However, most of the programs that were aired at that time were vulgar which caused well-known critic Sōichi Ōya to mention in a program that TV made people in Japan "a nation of 100 million idiots"; those criticisms already gave birth to the idea of opening an education-focused TV station. On February 17, 1956, the Ministry of Posts and Telecommunications issued frequency allocations, and the Kantō region obtained three licenses in total. Among the three, one of them is used by NHK Educational TV, while the other two were open for private bidding. Among those bidders are film production companies Toho and Toei Company, radio broadcasters Nippon Cultural Broadcasting and Nippon Broadcasting System, and educational publishing group Obunsha. On July 4, 1957, the Ministry of Posts and Telecommunications later decided to unify those applications into Tokyo Educational Television (as its tentative name) which was later obtained on July 8.

On October 10, 1957, Tokyo Educational Television held its first shareholders meeting and changed its company name to Nippon Educational Television Co., Ltd. (NET). On November 1 of the same year, the broadcaster was later established. After Fuji Television obtained their broadcast licenses, they set an official start date of broadcast on March 1, 1959. NET advanced their start date of broadcast a month earlier (February 1, 1959). On Christmas Eve 1958, NET began its test transmissions. On January 9 of the following year, their broadcast license was approved, and test transmissions continued every night throughout the month.

At the time of founding, the following locations were considered for the building of its headquarters:

- Ochanomizu Kishi Memorial Gymnasium
- Adjacent to Hotel Okura in Toranomon
- Land owned by a bank facing Aoyama Street in front of Jingumae
- The site of the Fuji Television headquarters in Kawada Town (current location of Kawada Town Garden)
- Toei Tokyo Studio Site
- Toei site in Roppongi (current location of Roppongi Hills)

NET took these considerations:

- Convenient transportation
- Possibility of future land expansion
- Easy access to communication systems and electricity
- Easy to build

After a careful consideration of these four conditions, a 9,100 square meter site at the location of the former Spanish embassy to Japan, was selected by Toei.

=== As Nippon Educational Television ===
The first NET TV logo, used 1957–1960

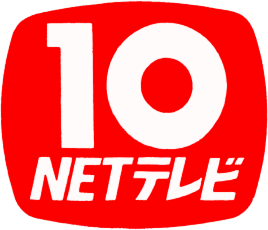
NET TV "Channel 10" old logo, used 1960–1977

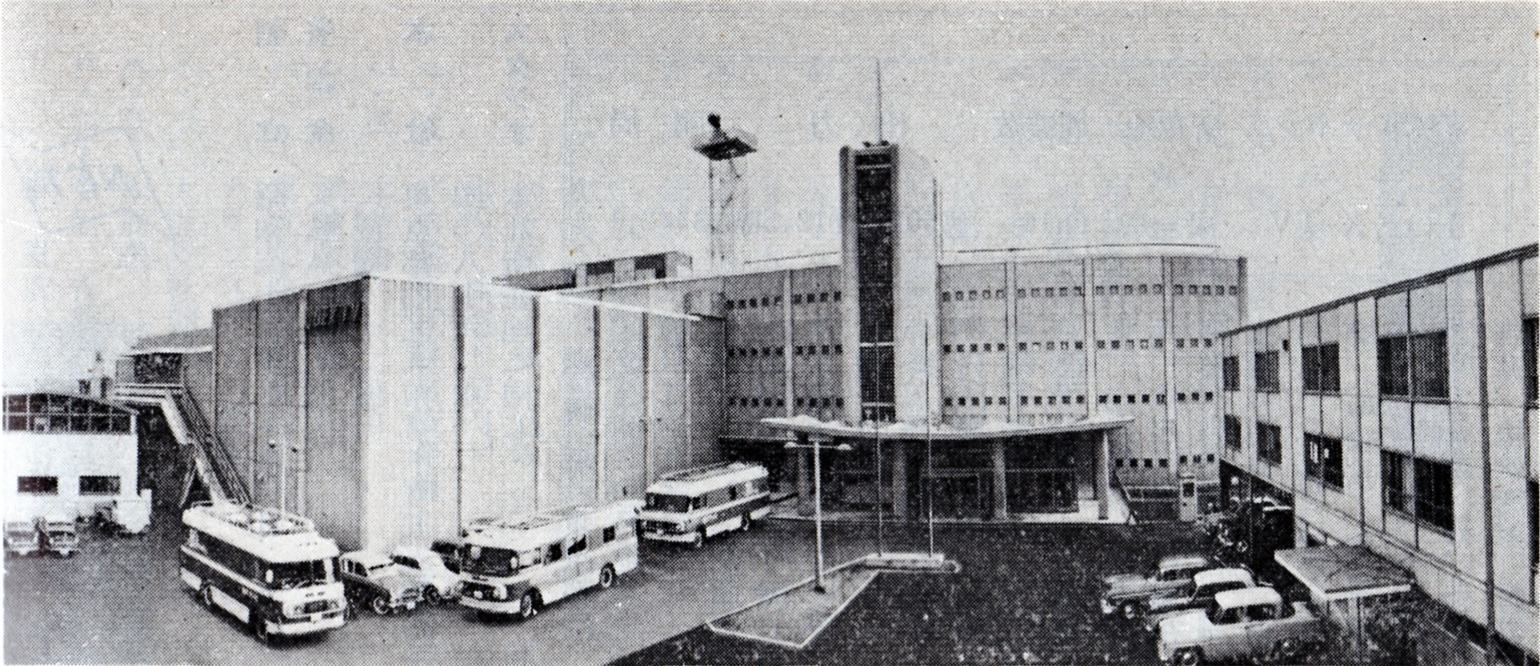
TV Asahi headquarters in 1961

At 9:55a.m. (JST) on February 1, 1959, NET signed on, airing at least 6.5 hours of programming per day. By April, this figure was extended to 10 hours. With the launch of the Mainichi Broadcasting System and Kyushu Asahi Broadcasting on March 1, 1959, NET programming started airing on those mentioned broadcasters. Shortly after the start of broadcasts, NET broadcast their first live program, which is the wedding of Crown Prince (now Emperor Emeritus) Akihito and Empress Michiko held on April 10 of the same year.

At the time, its broadcasting license dictated that the network was required to devote at least 50% of its airtime to educational programming, and at least 30% of its airtime to children's educational programming. However, the for-profit educational television model eventually proved to be a failure. In July 1959, average ratings of the network were less than 5%.

In 1960, NET began its transformation into a general-purpose television station. It began to broadcast anime and foreign movies (in the following years, the channel contains not only original anime but also foreign cartoons dubbed into Japanese). So as not to run afoul of the educational TV license requirements, NET justified the airing of these programs under the pretext of "nurturing a child's emotional range" (子供の情操教育のため, Kodomo no jōsō kyōiku no tame) and "introduction of foreign cultures" (外国文化の紹介, Gaikoku bunka no shōkai). As an example, the network labelled Bonanza and The Virginian, both American western series airing on rival networks, as educational, telling about the history of the United States, while comparing them to NET's dramas involving the samurai period of Japan. In December 1960, NET also changed its common name from Nippon Educational Television to NET TV (NETテレビ). The change also made its ratings to reach about 10% after 1963. Although it still ranks at the bottom rank of other rival broadcasters, it has greatly narrowed the gap between it and the other three.

The station began adding primetime programming in April 1961. Two years later, NET announced its arrival into the anime race with the Toei produced Wolf Boy Ken. The first of many Toei Animation productions, its premiere began a long line of animated cartoons and series that the station has aired until today.

Kenichiro Matsuoka, born in America and fluent in English, joined the board of NET and was responsible for licensing Laramie and Rawhide from the US, gaining high ratings for the network. This would give them their first advantage over rivals NHK and Fuji TV. He would eventually go on to serve as an Executive Vice President and eventual founder of Japan Cable Television.

In November 1963, NET joined forces with NHK General TV for the first live via satellite telecast in Japanese TV history.

==== Transition from educational to entertainment programming ====
The switch to general programming also led to an infighting among the management. In contrast to the then-president of NET TV, Hiroshi Ogawa (from Toei Company), who was actively promoting entertainment programs, Yoshio Akao (from Obunsha) thought that too many entertainment programs were against the original purpose of the educational TV station and was strongly dissatisfied with the vulgar programs that filled NET TV's program schedule at that time.In November 1964, Akao, together with shareholders other than Toei and Nikkei, Inc., succeeded in its major reorganization, forcing Ogawa to resign from the presidency.Since then, Toei's influence in NET TV has been gradually replaced by Asahi Shimbun.The following year, the Asahi Shimbun appointed to the post of station director Koshiji Miura (former Deputy Minister of Political Affairs).

In the 1960s, NET TV also started airing foreign films as part of its schedule. The NET TV premiere of The Morning Show in 1964 created a trend for a news-talk format on daytime Japanese TV, causing other networks to follow suit, it was the first Japanese morning program in its format. Hyōten, NET TV's drama in 1966, had a 42.7% ratings in its finale. The success of the drama made the network to adjust its target audiences to single and married females. Its license required NET to broadcast educational programs 50% of the time, cultural programs 30%, and entertainment 20%, the network classified golf tournaments and Japanese professional wrestling as "educational". Samurai historical dramas, an executive said, were educational because they taught viewers about Japanese history.

Despite heavily focusing on entertainment programs, they continued to broadcast educational programs, albeit on a limited number of hours every morning. In 1967, NET TV launched The Minkyokyo to strengthen the production of educational programs. In April 1967, they started to broadcast in color TV, and by 1969, all of its programs were broadcast in color. After 1968, many regional broadcasters in Japan began to pop up. This led to the broadcaster launching the All-Nippon News Network on April 1, 1970, the country's 4th national network, with NET producing national news and other nationally produced programming for the regional channels that had joined the network. With the continuous network expansion, NET TV shifted its focus on its target audience again, this time from females, to being family oriented similar to the US PBS.

But the best was yet to come. One year after ANN was launched, ground-breaking superhero series such as Kamen Rider, Metal Hero Series, and Super Sentai were produced by Toei, premiering on NET TV and the ANN network in April 1971 with the original Kamen Rider making its television debut. These programs ended the long-standing tokusatsu duopoly TBS and Fuji Television held with the then hit Ultra Series franchise for almost half a decade ago on TBS. Since 1958, TBS and Fuji TV were the only Japanese TV stations to air tokusatsu productions. With its hit premiere, a rivalry began to start between the three, with TBS seeing NET's tokusatsu programming as a threat. Toei's successful pitch was seen by its staff as a resurgence of their influence following the removal of Hiroshi Ogawa as president in 1964.

=== As Asahi National Broadcasting ===
TV Asahi "Channel 10" old logo, used from 1977 to 1996. After the "Network Symbol" was introduced, this logo was still used on the sign-on/sign-off bumper until 2001.

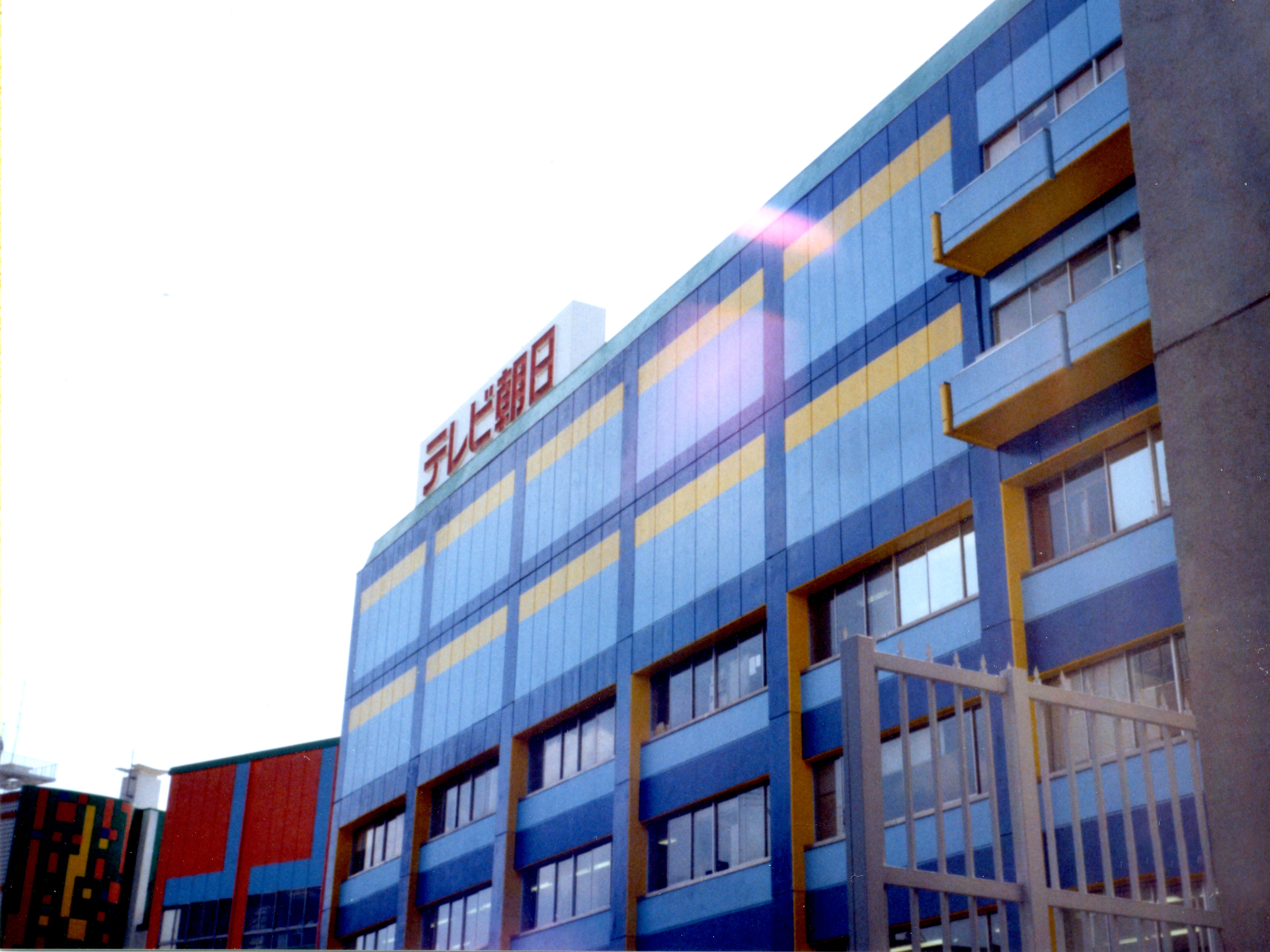
TV Asahi Roppongi Center (old building, photographed in October 1989)

In November 1973, the Ministry of Posts revised its plans on how TV broadcasters would operate, including abolishing education-focused TV broadcasting. Therefore, NET's transformation into a general-purpose television station was complete by that same month, when NET, along with the educational channel "Tokyo Channel 12" (now TV Tokyo) in Tokyo applied and received a general purpose television station license. In March of the following year, both ended their broadcasts of educational programming, completing the transition. Japan's major newspapers are also sorting out their holdings in TV stations. The Nikkei transferred its stake in NET TV to The Asahi Shimbun, making the latter the largest shareholder of NET TV. On April 1, 1975, the ANN affiliation in the Kansai region changed hands, from Mainichi Broadcasting System, ABC Television assumed the network affiliation slot. Days later, the channel debuted another Ishinomori creation, Himitsu Sentai Gorenger, yet another Toei production, and it would be a stunning success (this was the same month when Kamen Rider jumped ship to rival TBS with the season premiere of Kamen Rider Stronger, the franchise would return to what is now TV Asahi in 2000). The series marked the beginning of the Super Sentai franchise and established NET as a force to be reckoned with regarding tokusatsu productions and anime.

On April 1, 1977, the corporate name of NET TV was renamed Asahi National Broadcasting Co., Ltd. (Note: 全国朝日放送株式会社, Zenkoku Asahi Hōsō Kabushiki-gaisha; ANB), with the name of its channel changed to TV Asahi.This also symbolizes that the Asahi Shimbun has the right to operate TV Asahi both in name and in essence. Since December 17, 1978, TV Asahi has been broadcasting programs with stereo audio. The corporation also started entering into different ventures such as publishing in the late 70s to gain revenue other than advertising.

In 1977, thanks to his close relationship with Ivan Ivanovich, head of the Japanese Section of the International Department of the Communist Party of the Soviet Union, Koshiji Miura was able to meet with Soviet leader Leonid Brezhnev and help TV Asahi obtain exclusive broadcasting rights for the 1980 Summer Olympics in Moscow. This was the first time that a private TV station in Japan was exclusively granted the broadcasting rights of the Olympic Games, but this was controversial as rival broadcasters including NHK opposed the move. Japan followed the Western countries in boycotting the 1980 Summer Olympics. As a result, TV Asahi only aired high-profile Olympic events and the broadcaster had significant losses in its revenue.

==== Roppongi HQ Redevelopment ====
As the broadcaster expanded its business, its HQ ran out of space. Since its HQ was located in a residential area, it became difficult to expand its existing infrastructure. TV Asahi collaborated with property development firm Mori Building Company to redevelop the Roppongi area. While the new HQ was under development, TV Asahi temporarily moved to the newly built studios in Ark Hills. In 1985, the Ark Broadcasting Center was officially completed. As Japan entered into the economic bubble era, local residents around the Roppongi area had a negative perception towards the redevelopment of the said area, which resulted into delaying the redevelopment plan. The old headquarters was demolished in 2000. Prior to the new headquarters being built on the site, offices of TV Asahi were located in multiple locations around Tokyo, including the studios in Ark Hills.

=== Pre-transition to TV Asahi Corporation and Triple Crown ratings ===
TV Asahi "Network Symbol" logo, designed by American designer Tim Girvin. Used from 1996 to 2003.

The launch of the evening news program "News Station" and "Super J Channel" in 1985 and 1997 helped TV Asahi establish its positive viewership advantage at 5pm and 10pm on weekdays, strengthening its position in news programs as a partnership with Turner-owned CNN and Capital Cities/ABC-owned ABC News from the US. In 1987, ANN had a total of 14 regional affiliated stations, much smaller than the other 3 networks (JNN and FNN/FNS had 25 each and NNN/NNS had 27). However, affected by the economic bubble at that time, Kikuo Tashiro (then president of TV Asahi), announced that it wouldn't open more regional stations which resulted in protest from the existing stations. As a result, the decision was reverted and decided to open 10 more stations. In response to the arrival of satellite TV, TV Asahi established TV Asahi Satellite Corporation in 1991.

On November 22, 1995, TV Asahi premiered the American series The X-Files at an 8:00 pm prime time slot, the first since Knight Rider. The station began airing the series due to the success of The X-Files in the Japanese home video market with 200,000 cassettes sold beyond the threshold of 10,000. As part of the airing of the series, TV Asahi organized an "extensive promotional campaign" on the same month with a convention in Tokyo featuring screenings of episodes yet to release on home video and appearances by celebrity fans, Japanese translations of The X-Files books and an X-Files Mystery Tour to the filming locations of the series.

After Iwate Asahi Television started broadcasting in 1996, the number of ANN stations reached 26, announcing that the broadcaster has already completed the establishment of its national network. In June of the same year, media tycoon Rupert Murdoch and investor Masayoshi Son planned to buy a large stake of TV Asahi, jeopardizing the status of Asahi Shimbun as the major shareholder. In this regard, Toshitada Nakae personally went to the US to meet Murdoch and asked him not to increase his shareholding to TV Asahi. By the following year, Asahi Shimbun purchased the shares of TV Asahi held by Murdoch and Son. TV Asahi is listed on the Tokyo Stock Exchange since October 3, 2000. Multiple changes happened since 2000 after TV Asahi had been staying in the same 4th place for 10 consecutive years in TV ratings. In April 2000, major changes in its schedules, such as starting its programs a few minutes before the top of the hour and improving its entertainment programming at late-night. TV Asahi launched its satellite channel BS Asahi in December 2000.

=== Return to Roppongi and renaming to TV Asahi Corporation ===
On September 29, 2003, TV Asahi moved back its head office from its Ark Hills Studio to Roppongi Hills. On October 1, the company changed its name to TV Asahi Corporation, with the name presented as TV asahi on-screen, commemorating the 45th anniversary of the broadcaster. As part of digital broadcasting, TV Asahi started to broadcast on digital TV, being designated to channel 5. In 2004, TV Asahi's ratings reached 7.5% ranking third among the commercial broadcasters in the Kanto Region after a lapse of 32 years. The ratings would further improve by the following year, ranking first in late-night TV ratings. However, in 2008, affected by the global recession, TV Asahi recorded its first annual loss of revenue. In 2009, Hiroshi Hayakawa became the president of the broadcaster, being the first president of TV Asahi who had been serving the broadcaster since its inauguration. Between April and June 2012, TV Asahi won in the Triple Crown ratings for the first time with 12.3% in primetime, 12.7% in evening time, and 7.9% for whole day.

On May 10, 2011, TV Asahi launched its mascot "Go-chan" which was designed by Sanrio.

On April 1, 2014, TV Asahi became a certified broadcasting holding company "TV Asahi Holdings, Inc.", and newly founded "TV Asahi Corporation" took over the broadcasting business.

The transmission of international aquatics competitions, FIFA World Cup football matches, and creation of popular late-night TV programs contributed to a rise in ratings for TV Asahi and lifted the TV station from its popularly ridiculed "perpetual fourth place" finish into second place, right behind Fuji TV, by 2005. Disney-owned ABC signed a strategic alliance with former rival commercial broadcaster Fuji TV due to sluggish viewership ratings.

The station also launched its own mascot, Gō EX Panda (ゴーエクスパンダ, Gō Ekkusu Panda), also known as Gō-chan (ゴーちゃん。) Gō-chan is currently seen on TV Asahi's opening sign-on ID.

Partnership agreements with Zee Entertainment Enterprises Limited of India and the Kantana Group of Thailand were signed on March 31, 2015.

Beginning April 11, 2022, TV Asahi's programs were made available on the TVer platform. It was initially scheduled for September 2021, but was delayed several times due to update problems.

== Branding ==
Upon becoming TV Asahi in 1977, the station opted to use a red and green 10 mark. This was joined in October 1996 by a new special logo created following the launch of Iwate Asahi Television to represent the completion of the ANN network. It was designed by Tim Garvin, at the time known for his Hollywood works in movies such as Dances With Wolves and Unforgiven.

TV Asahi's current branding were created by British design collective Tomato (some members work as the electronic music group Underworld) along with TV Asahi's in-house design department in 2003. It comprises a set of computer-generated "sticks" in white background, which changes in colour and movement along with the background music that accompanies the idents. TV Asahi also uses a brief eyecatch of its sticks animation at the top-left of the screen after commercial breaks. The background music used for TV Asahi's sign-on and sign-off videos are Underworld's Born Slippy .NUXX 2003 and Rez. TV Asahi later updated its sign-on and sign-off video in 2008 with a revised version of computer-generated "sticks" animation and new background music. TV Asahi's slogan New Air, On Air. appears at the top of its name. It can be seen on TV Asahi's YouTube channel, which in 2011–12, was replaced by its mascot, Go-Chan.

The company writes its name in lower-case letters, tv asahi, in its logo and public-image materials. Normally, the station branding on-screen appears as either "/tv asahi" or "tv asahi\". The station's watermark appearance is the stick at the top with the station's name at the bottom. The fonts used by TV Asahi for the written parts are Akzidenz Grotesk Bold (English) and Hiragino Kaku Gothic W8 (Japanese).

From 1991 to 2001, TV Asahi was unique among the national television networks for its English language theme song, Join Us, which was used for both the startup and closedown sequences. Before that, from 1977 to 1987, another song (わが家の友だち10チャンネル, Wagaya no Tomodachi 10 channeru, Terebi Asahi, also the name of the relaunch event on April 1, 1977) was used for these (instrumental only from 1978, formerly with vocals).

The broadcaster's official abbreviation is EX, taken from its callsign (JOEX), since October 1, 2003. During the Nippon Educational Television era, the English company name was Nippon Educational Television Co., Ltd. to NET, and during the National Asahi Broadcasting era, Asahi National Broadcasting Co., Ltd. to ANB. Initially, it was planned that NET would become All Asahi Broadcasting Co., Ltd., and that it would also use AAB as an abbreviation, but the name had already been registered as a trademark and there were doubts about adding "All" to the name of a single company. Because of this, the broadcaster selected ANB. AAB is used as the English abbreviation for Akita Asahi Broadcasting, which opened in 1992.

== Programs ==
=== Variety and music ===
- Ametalk! (アメトーーク!)
- Karere Monday (帰れマンデー)
- London Hearts (ロンドンハーツ)
- Music Station (ミュージックステーション)
- Tetsuko's Room (徹子の部屋)
- Zawatsuku! Friday (ザワつく!金曜日)
- Nakai Masahiro no Dojoubi na kai (中居正広の土曜日な会} (2019-2024)

=== Dramas and TV series ===
- Tuesday Drama (火曜21時, since 1987)
- Wednesday Drama (水曜21時, since 1987)
- Thursday Drama (木曜ドラマ, since 1982)
- Friday Night Drama (金曜ナイトドラマ, since 2000)
- Saturday Night Drama (土曜ナイトドラマ, since 2000)
- Sunday Night Drama (日曜22時, since 2023)
- Drama L (ドラマL, since 2018)
- Kamen Rider (since 2000)
- Super Sentai (since 1979)
- Wonderful (since 2016)

=== Information and news programs ===
- Good! Morning (グッド!モーニング, morning news, since 2013)
- Morning Show (モーニングショー, morning talk show, second incarnation since 2015)
- Wide! Scramble (ワイド!スクランブル, daytime news, since 1996)
- Super J Channel (スーパーJチャンネル, afternoon and evening news, since 1997)
- Hōdō Station (報道ステーション, late-night news, since 2004)

==== Reliability ====
According to the 2019 Reuters Institute Digital News Report, TV Asahi was the lowest-positioned among the news operations of five networks in Japan, with a score of 5.76 points, behind (in growing order) Fuji TV (5.79), TBS (5.86), NTV (5.95) and NHK (6.32, itself the most-reliable overall source according to the study).

=== Foreign programming ===
TV Asahi also occasionally broadcast a number of foreign movies and series, dubbed and some subtitled into Japanese (such as Police Academy: The Animated Series, The Smurfs, Adventures of the Gummi Bears, CatDog, Bonkers, Freakazoid!, Iznogoud and The Wacky World of Tex Avery).

=== Current ===
==== Football (Soccer) ====
- FIFA
  - National teams
    - FIFA World Cup
    - FIFA Women's World Cup
- JFA
  - Japan women's national football team
  - Japan national football team
- AFC
  - AFC Asian Cup (shared with DAZN)
- J1 League (shared with Abema)

==== Basketball ====
- FIBA
  - FIBA Basketball World Cup

==== Baseball ====
- Nippon Professional Baseball
- World Baseball Classic

==== Golf ====
- U.S. Open
- The Open Championship

==== Pro Wrestling ====
- New Japan Pro-Wrestling

==== Volleyball ====
- FIVB (co-coverage with JNN)
  - FIVB Men's Volleyball World Championship
  - FIVB Men's Volleyball Nations League
  - FIVB Women's Volleyball World Championship
  - FIVB Women's Volleyball Nations League

==== Multi-sport events ====
- World Aquatics Championships
- Olympic Games (via Japan Consortium)
  - Summer Olympic Games
  - Winter Olympic Games
  - Youth Olympic Games

== Headquarters ==
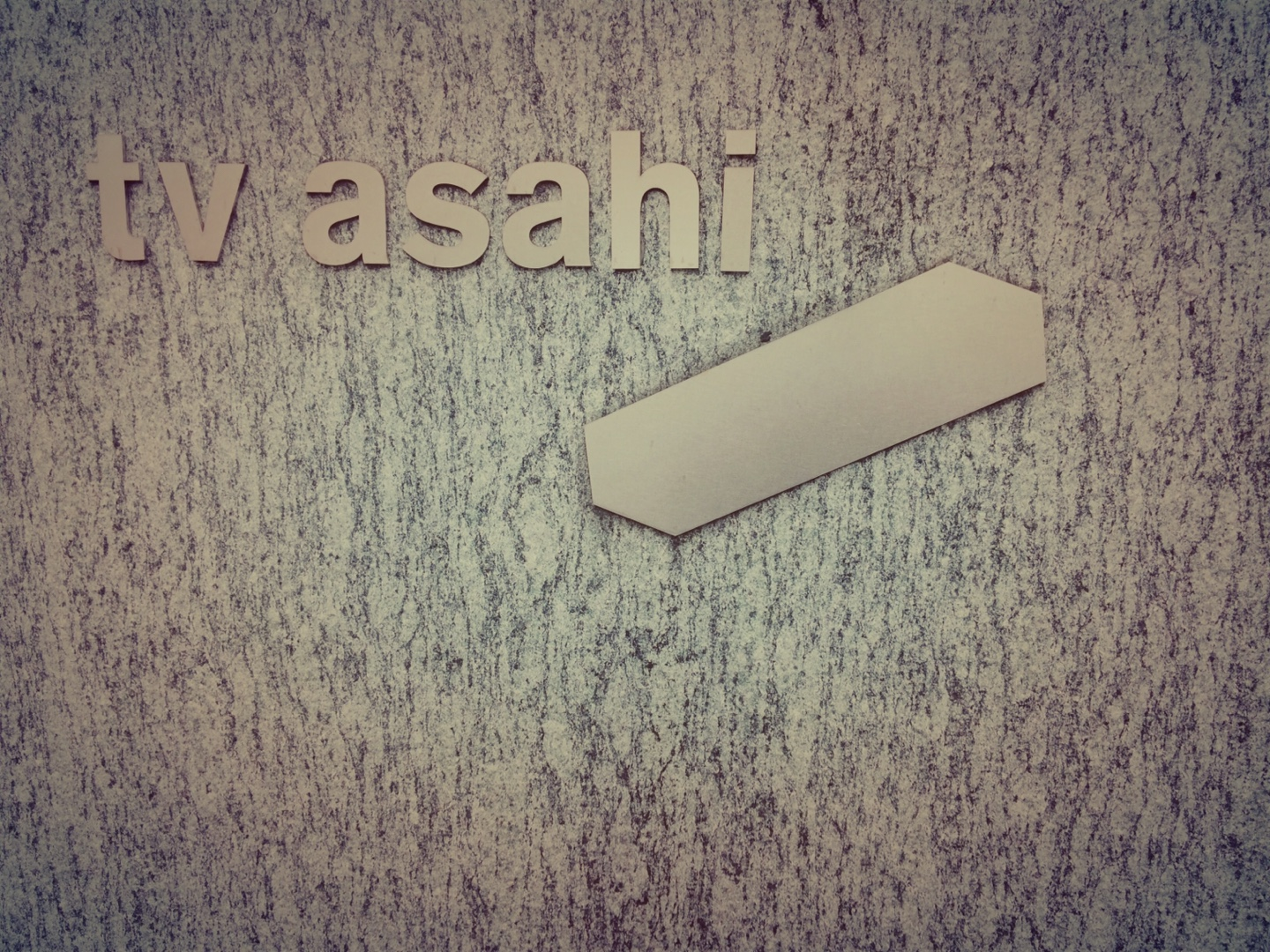
Sign of TV asahi in headquarters since 2003

In 2003, the company headquarters moved to a new building designed by Fumihiko Maki currently located at 6-9-1 Roppongi, Minato, Tokyo, Japan.

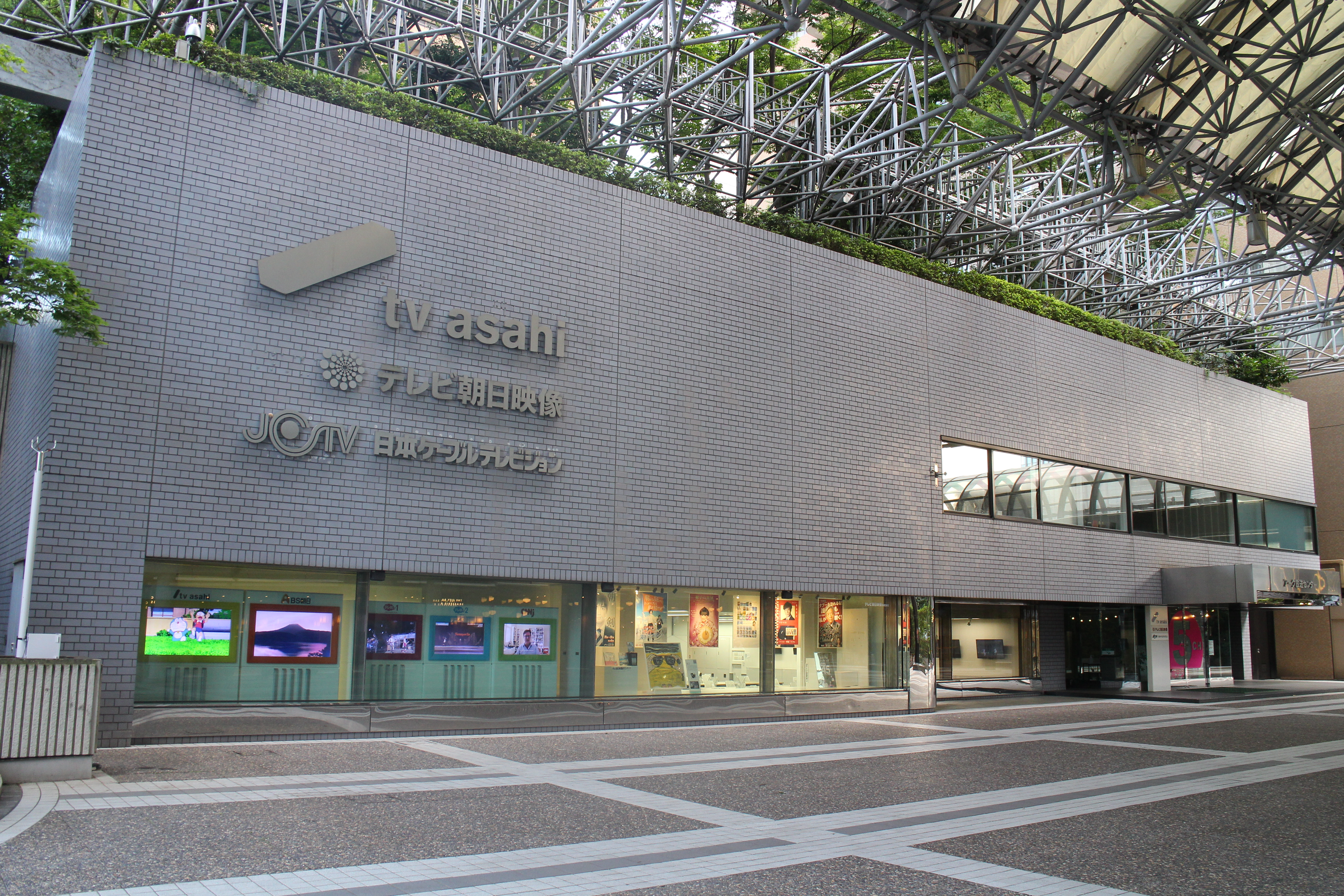
TV Asahi's Broadcasting Center at Ark Hills, not far from its headquarters since 2003

Some of TV Asahi's departments and subsidiaries, such as TV Asahi Productions and Take Systems, are still located at TV Asahi Center, the company's former headquarters from 1986 to 2003. It is located at Ark Hills, not far from its headquarters.

== See also ==
- Television in Japan
