= Roppongi =

District of Tokyo, Japan

Roppongi 六本木
- District
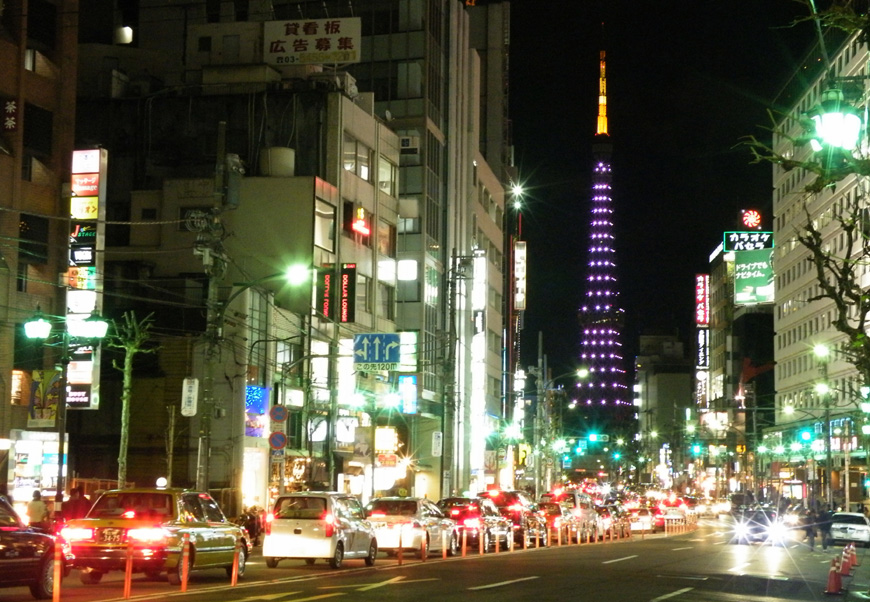
- Roppongi at night, with Tokyo Tower in the background

- Location of Roppongi within Tokyo Location of Roppongi within Tokyo Bay
- Coordinates: 35°39′36″N 139°43′48″E
- Country: Japan
- Region: Kantō
- Prefecture: Tokyo
- Ward: Minato, Tokyo
- Established: -
- Elevation: 16.0 m (52.5 ft)

Population (January 1, 2016)
  - Total: 12,111
- Time zone: UTC+9 (JST)
- Postal code: 106-0032
- Area code: 03

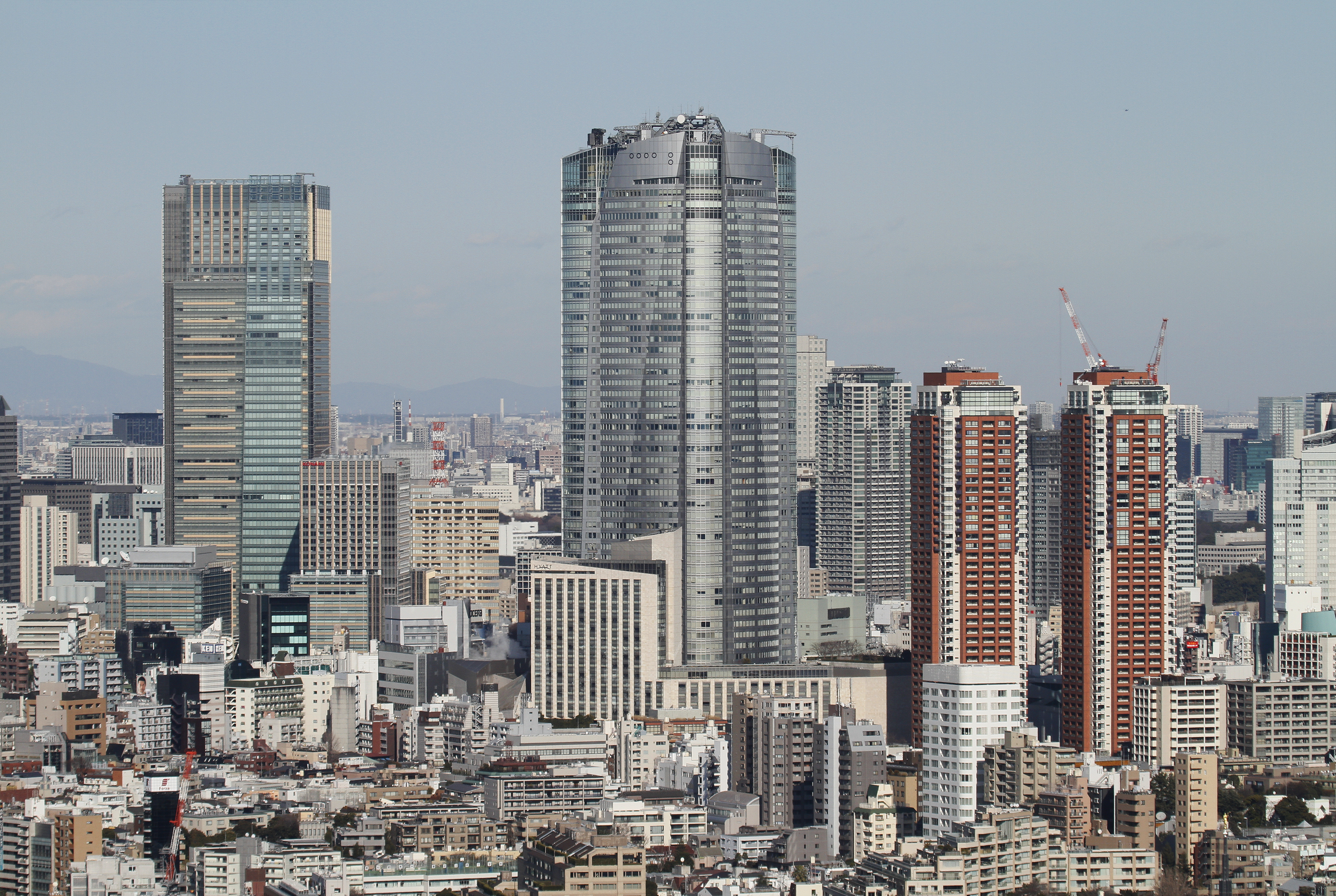
Roppongi Hills' buildings (center and right) and Tokyo Midtown Tower (left)

Roppongi (Japanese: 六本木, [ɾo̞ppõ̞ŋʲɡʲi], lit. 'six trees') is a district of Minato, Tokyo, Japan, famous for the Roppongi Hills development area, an upscale commercial and residential complex, and night club scene. Several foreign embassies are located in or near Roppongi. The district is in central Tokyo, situated south of Akasaka and north of Azabu and is noted for its night life, attracting both local residents and visitors from abroad.

== History ==
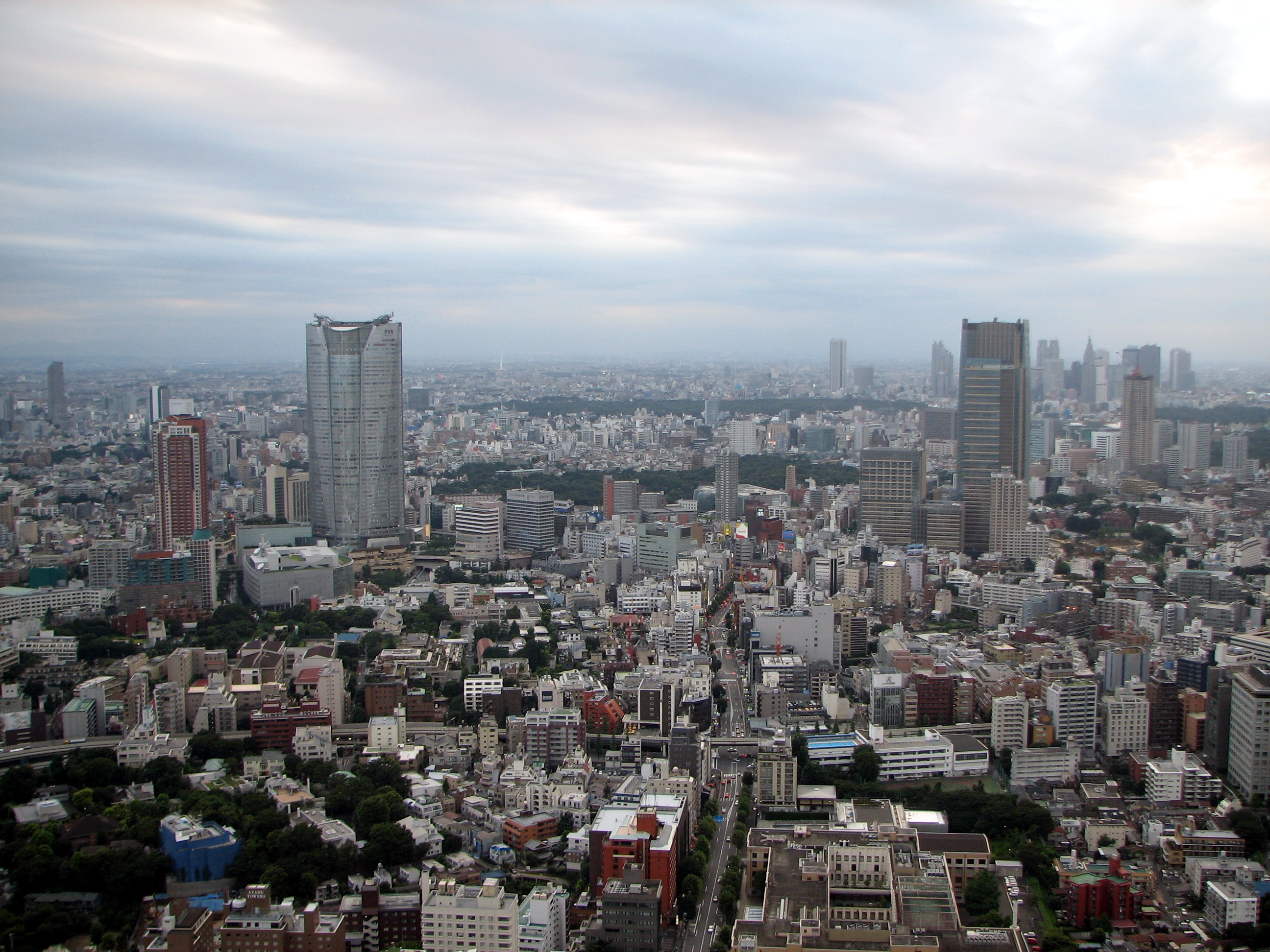
View of the Roppongi area as seen from Tokyo Tower.

The name Roppongi, which appears to have been coined around 1660, literally means "six trees". According to one account, the name comes from six very old and large zelkova trees that used to mark the area; the first three were cleared, and the last were destroyed during World War II. Another legend has it that the name comes from the fact that six daimyōs lived nearby during the Edo period, each with the kanji character for "tree" or a kind of tree in their names. Roppongi was not extensively populated until after the Meiji Restoration, although the area was trafficked for centuries and served as the site of the cremation of Shōgun Tokugawa Hidetada's wife in 1626.

In 1890, the Third Imperial Guard of the Imperial Japanese Army was moved to a site near Roppongi (now home to the Pacific bureau of Stars and Stripes). The influx of soldiers led to the area's rise as a nightlife district, briefly interrupted by the Great Kanto earthquake which flattened the area in 1923. Roppongi was administratively part of Azabu Ward from 1878 to 1947.

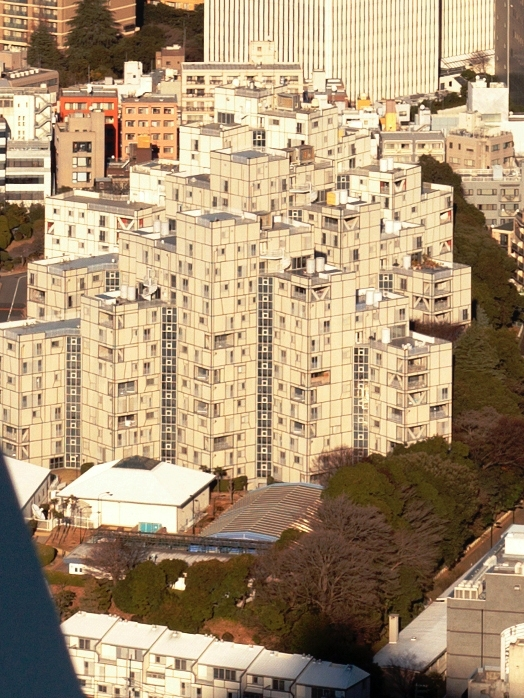
US Embassy Housing Compound in Roppongi-Nichōme

After World War II, during which the area was again destroyed, this time by aerial bombing raids, the United States Army and Allied government officials occupied several facilities in the area, beginning Roppongi's reputation as a neighborhood with large numbers of non-Japanese. Several large US military installations were located in the nearby area, with Hardy Barracks probably the most significant (the US Embassy Housing Compound and Akasaka Press Center including Hardy Barracks Recreational Lodging, Stars and Stripes office and heliport are still there). Surrounding the military installations were many Japanese-owned restaurants, pool halls, bars, and brothels which catered to US military personnel but were also often frequented by Japanese customers.

Starting in the late 1960s, Roppongi became popular among Japanese people and foreigners alike for its disco scene, which attracted many of Tokyo's entertainment elites. Contributing to the international scene was the location of several foreign embassies and foreign corporate offices in the Roppongi area. However, many dance clubs shut down in the recession following the market crash of 1989.

The Roppongi area received a major economic boost in 2002–2003 when the Izumi Garden Tower and the Roppongi Hills high-rise complexes were completed. These projects brought high-end office and condominium space to Roppongi for the first time. The Tokyo Midtown project in neighbouring Akasaka, which was completed in 2006, and includes the first Tokyo Ritz-Carlton Hotel, continued this trend.

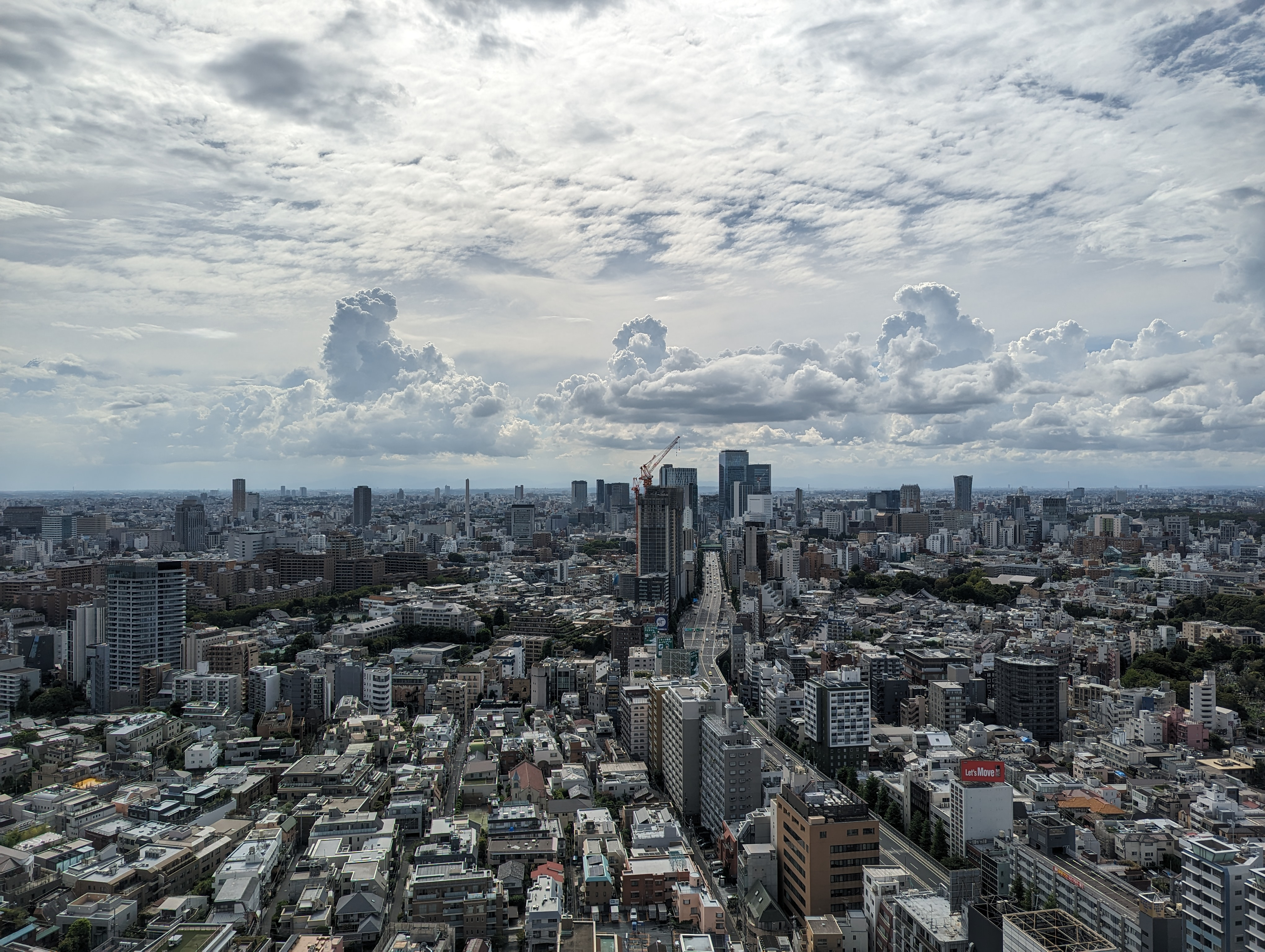
Roppongi Avenue seen from Roppongi Hills Mori Tower

== Nightlife ==
The area features numerous bars, nightclubs, strip clubs, restaurants, hostess clubs, cabarets, and other forms of entertainment. Among the expatriate community, the area tends to be favored by business people, students, and off-duty US military personnel. Overall, the neighborhood caters to a younger crowd.

Clubs can range from large, multi-level establishments, to smaller one-room clubs located in upper levels of buildings. In more recent times some of the larger venues with known yakuza connections have closed. Around Roppongi crossing are a number of clubs which feature foreign performers. There are also a number of both foreign- and Japanese-operated bars catering to different crowds. Recently, Roppongi has enjoyed a growing reputation for its organized events such as art festivals, dart and billiard tournaments, pub crawls, robot exhibitions, and beauty pageants.

Restaurants in Roppongi vary from upscale Japanese fare to popular international restaurants.

== Culture ==
Roppongi is home to many important art galleries and museums in Tokyo, serving as a center hub for culture. This includes prestigious institutions such as the Mori Art Museum, Kotaro Nukaga, Galerie Perrotin, and The National Art Center, Tokyo.

== Economy ==
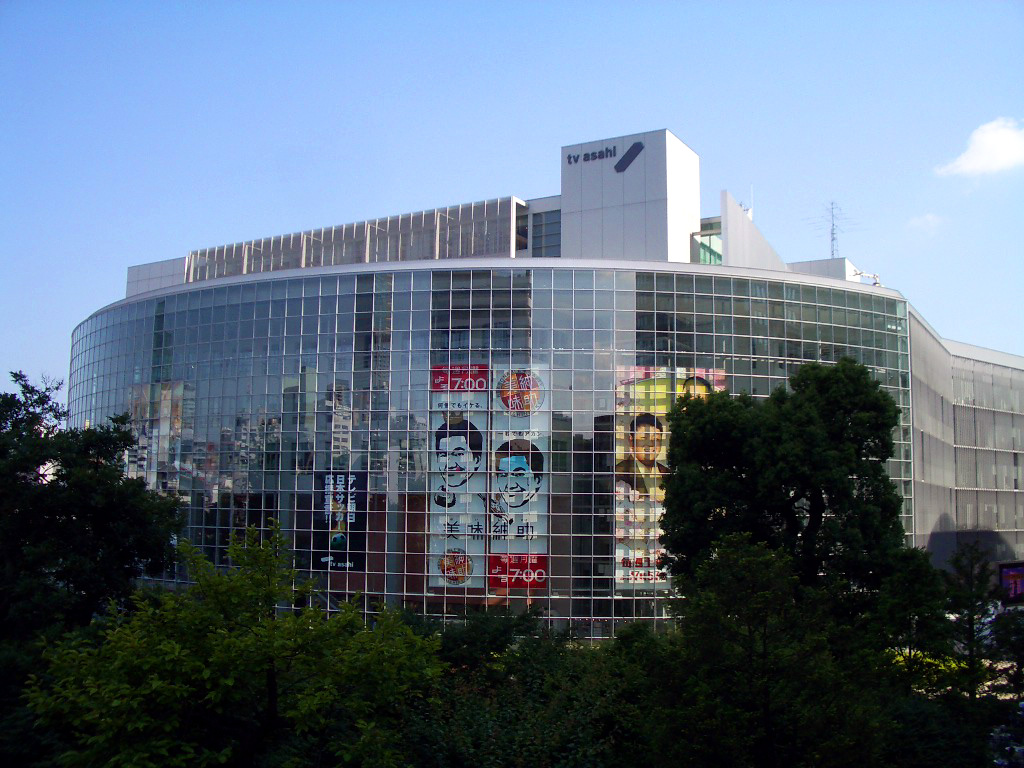
The headquarters of TV Asahi, which was moved from Ark Hills to Roppongi Hills in 2003

Mori Building Company and The Pokémon Company have their headquarters in the Roppongi Hills Mori Tower.

Companies based in Roppongi include:

- TV Asahi
- Google Japan
- Being Inc.
- Wrestling New Classic
- NJPW World

== Rail and subway stations ==
- Roppongi Station (Tokyo Metro Hibiya Line (H-04) & Toei Ōedo Line) (E-23)
- Roppongi-itchōme Station (Tokyo Metro Namboku Line) (N-06)
- Nogizaka Station (Tokyo Metro Chiyoda Line) (C-05)

== Education ==
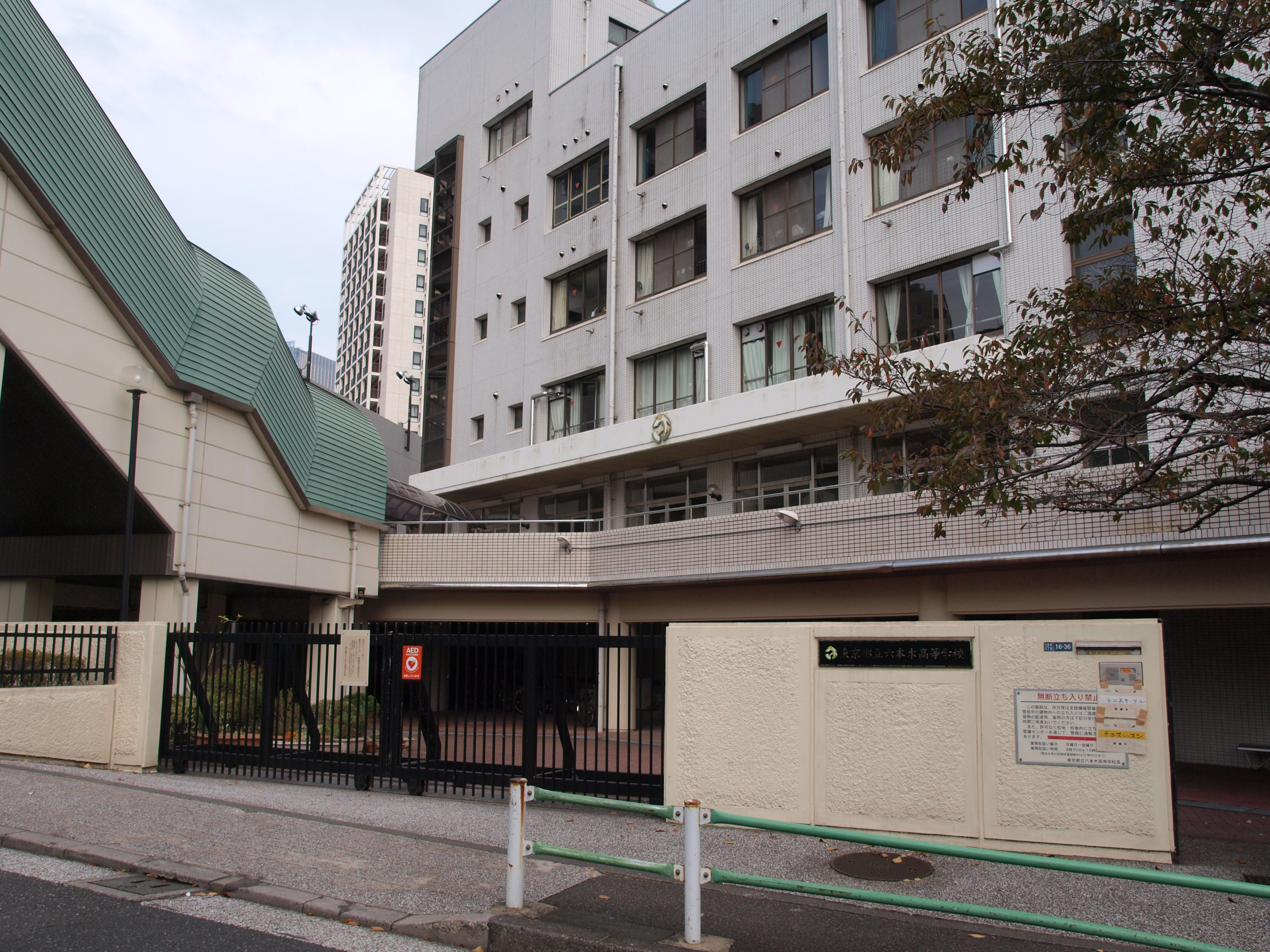
Roppongi High School

Public elementary and middle schools are operated by the Minato City (the Minato Ward) Board of Education. Roppongi Junior High School is located at Imoarai-Zaka, in Roppongi.

Roppongi 1-chōme, 3-chōme, and 4-chōme, as well as 1-8 and 15-18 ban of 5-chōme, and 1-22 ban of 7-chōme, are zoned to Azabu Elementary School. 2-chōme is zoned to Akasaka Elementary School. 9-14 ban of 5-chōme and 6-chōme are zoned to Nanzan Elementary School. 23-ban of 7-chōme is zoned to Kōgai Elementary School.

The majority of Roppongi is zoned to Roppongi Junior High School. However, 2-chōme is instead zoned to Akasaka Junior High School. Roppongi 7-chome 23-ban is instead zoned to Koryo Junior High School.

Public high schools are operated by the Tokyo Metropolitan Government Board of Education. Roppongi High School is located in Roppongi.

Toyo Eiwa Jogakuin is private girls school, also located at Torii-Zaka in the district.

The American School in Japan Early Learning Center is in Roppongi Hills.

Minato City Library operates Azabu Library in Roppongi.

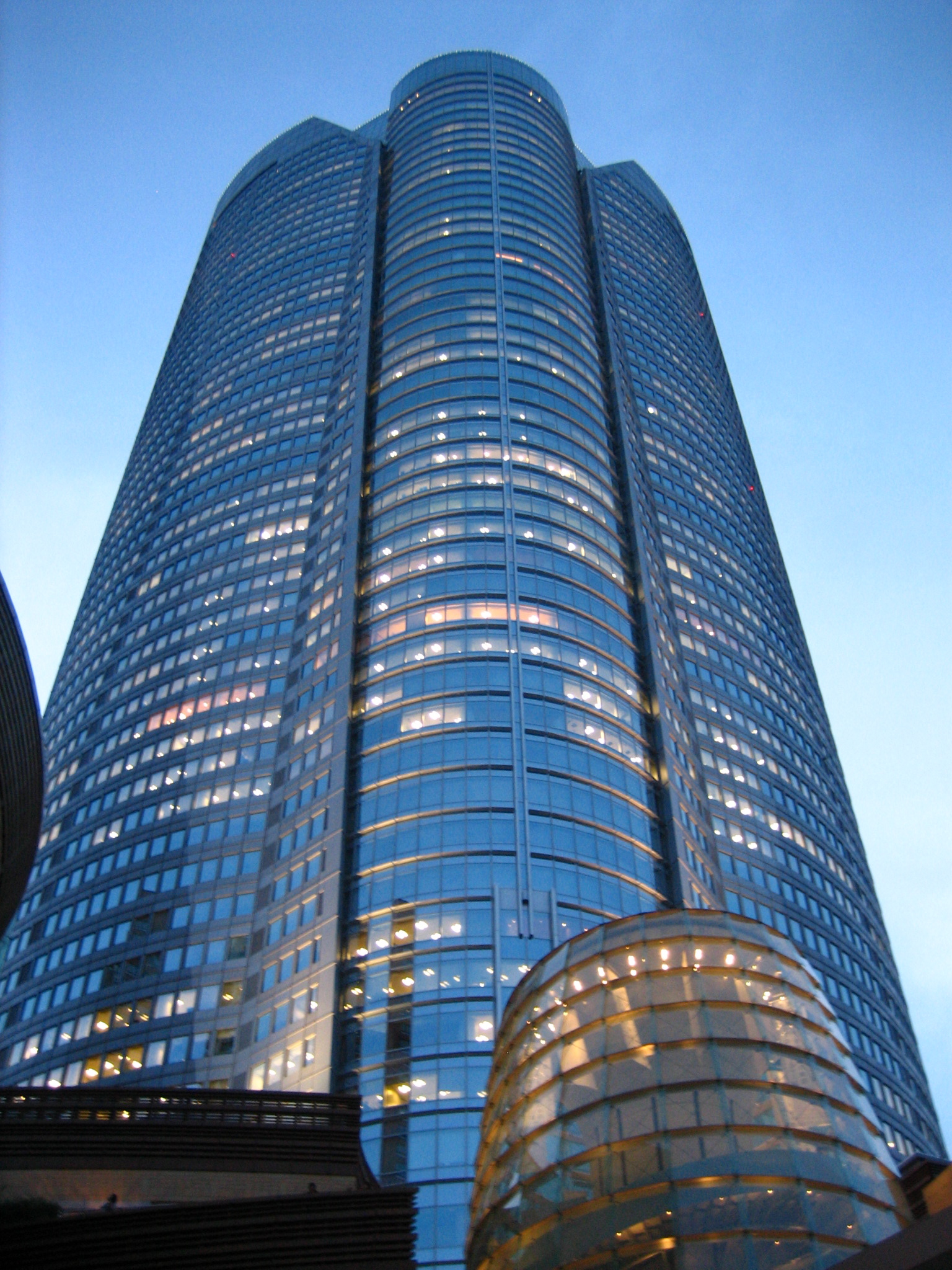
Partially lit Mori Tower from a low view

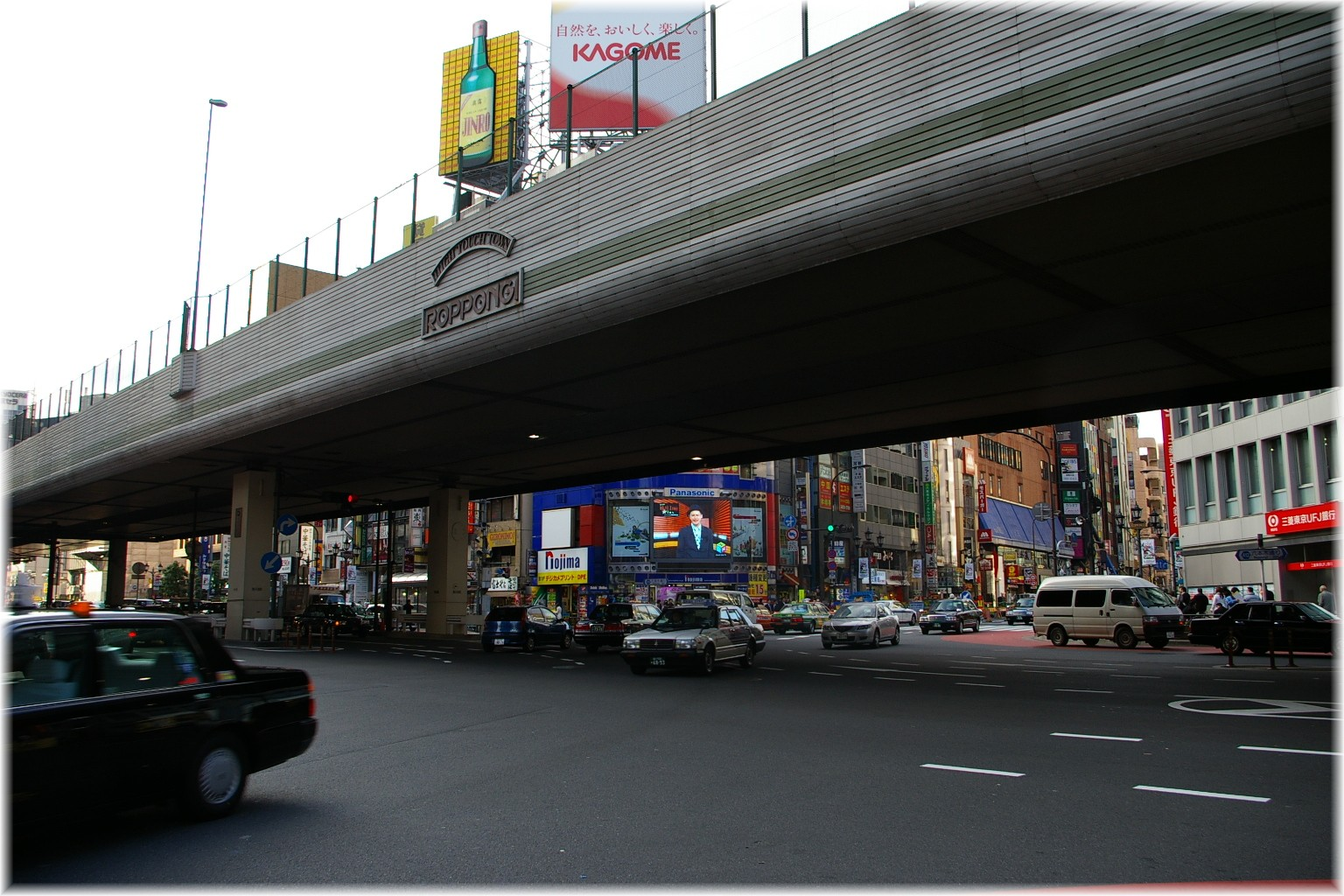
Roppongi crossing

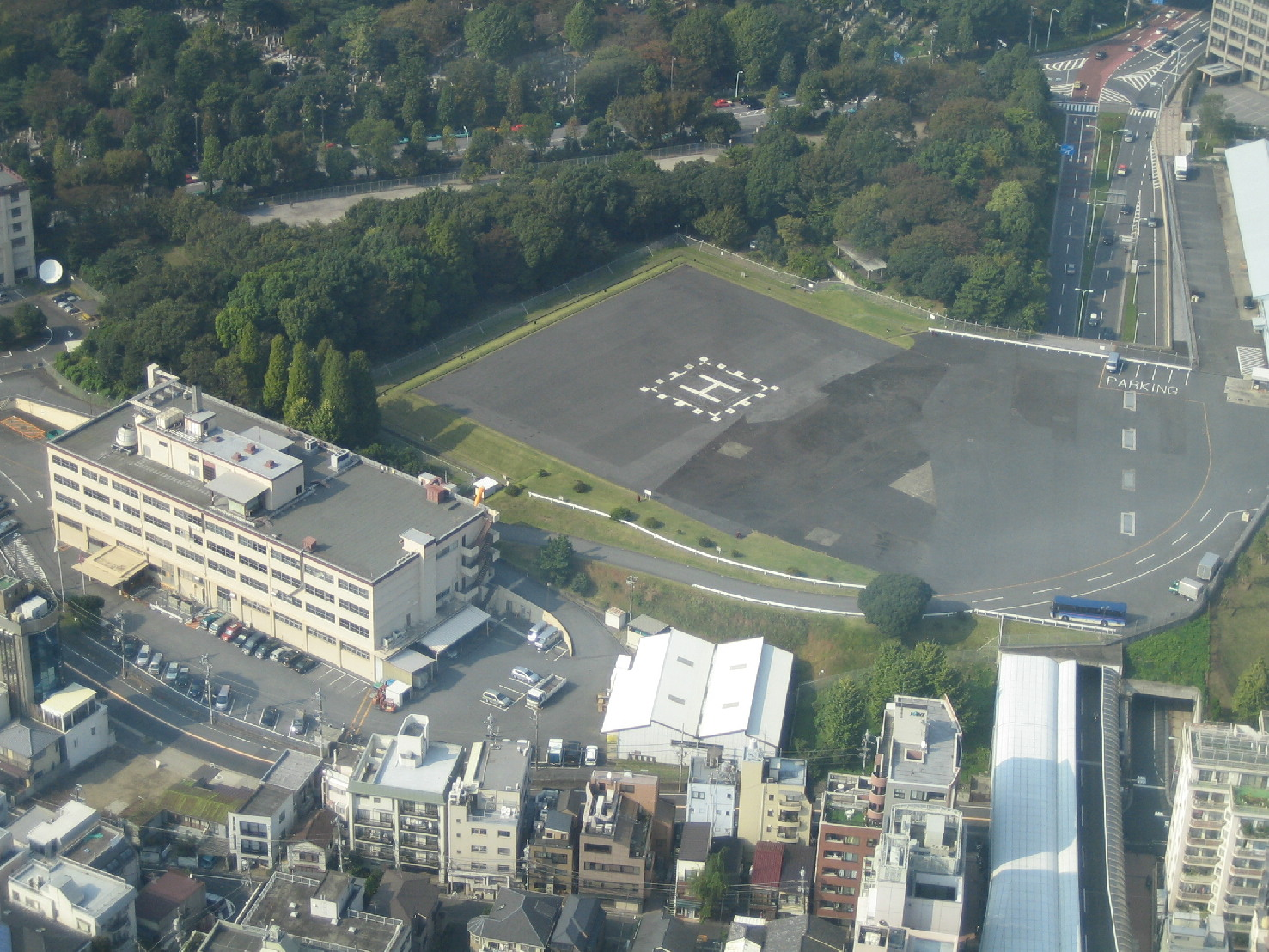
US Army heliport and Stars and Stripes office in Roppongi-Nanachōme

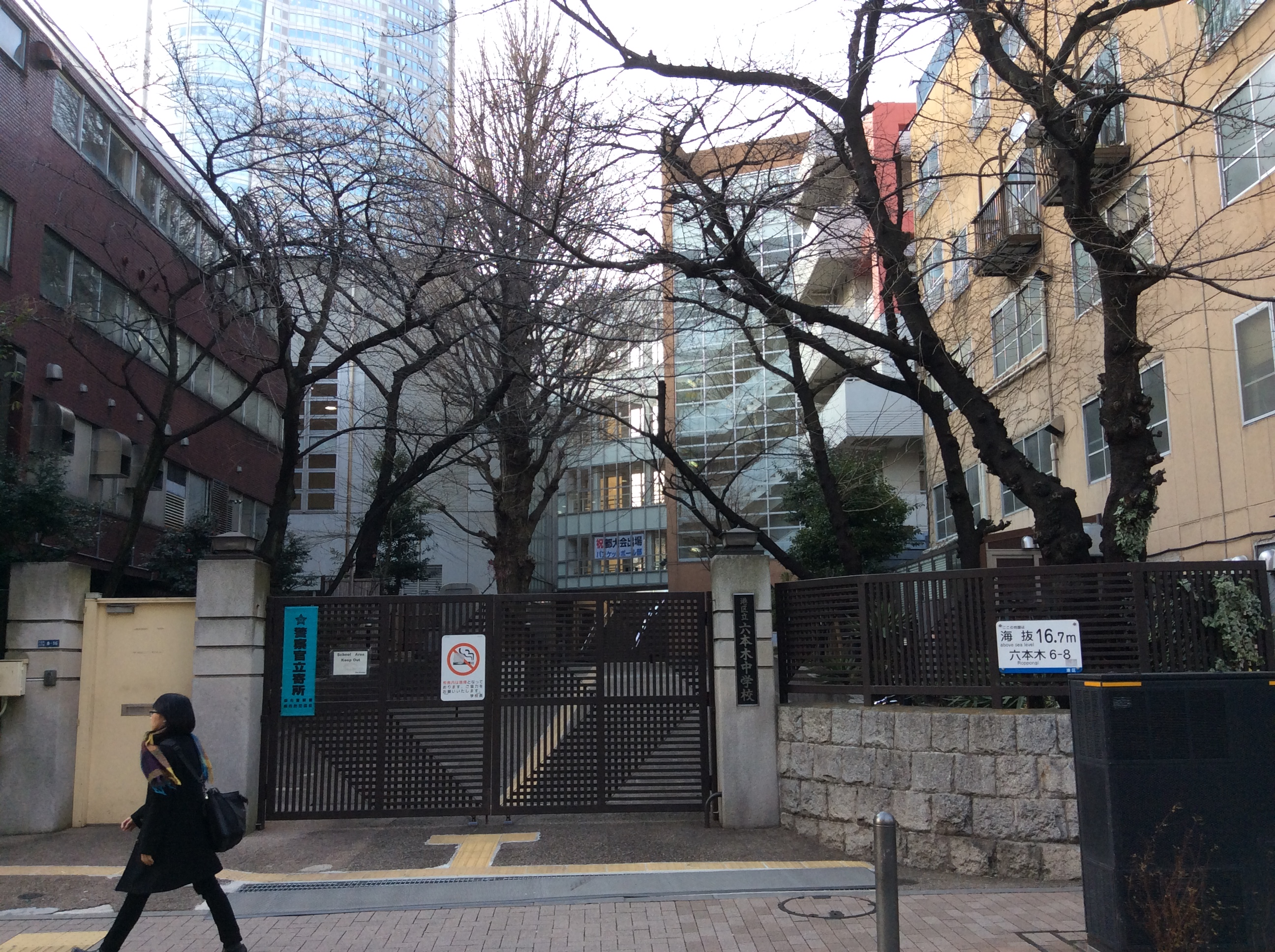
Roppongi Junior High School

== Controversies ==
In the past, Roppongi had a reputation as an area with high yakuza presence, whether as customers at Roppongi establishments, conducting business, or managing or owning clubs and bars in the area. Although still exerting some influence in Roppongi, in recent times they appear to have shifted much of their presence to other districts in the Tokyo area.

In 2006, Nigerian immigrants to Japan began opening a number of bars and nightclubs in the area, following an earlier group of innovators who had been in business in Roppongi for many years. The Nigerians were noted for using visible, high-pressure tactics to draw customers to their bars. In 2009 and 2010 a series of drink-spiking incidents, in which customers reported being drugged and robbed, were linked to Nigerian-owned bars. The incidents resulted in the United States embassy in Japan warning US citizens to avoid certain bars and clubs in Roppongi. An investigation by The Japan Times in July 2011 found that though drink spiking occurred, most of the incidents did not involve criminal activity. Many customers claimed unusually severe hangovers after nights spent in Nigerian-run establishments. Similar complaints are often made about non-Nigerian bars in Roppongi that offer unlimited drink packages and often lace drinks with hard liquor to minimize customer consumption and increase profit.

== Notable residents ==
- Terry Farnsworth (born 1942), Canadian Olympic judoka
