= Japan Cable Television =

Japanese television production company

Japan Cable Television (日本ケーブルテレビジョン) (JCTV) is a Japanese television production company, established in October 1971. Its major shareholders are TV Asahi Holdings and Tokyu Agency. It also distributes CNN channels to Japan, available on SKY PerfecTV! and other providers.

== TV channels ==
- CNNj HD: Mix of CNN International and CNN/US
- CNN/US HD: Relays HD feed of CNN/US
