= TV Asahi Building =

Office building in Tokyo, Japan

- テレビ朝日本社ビル
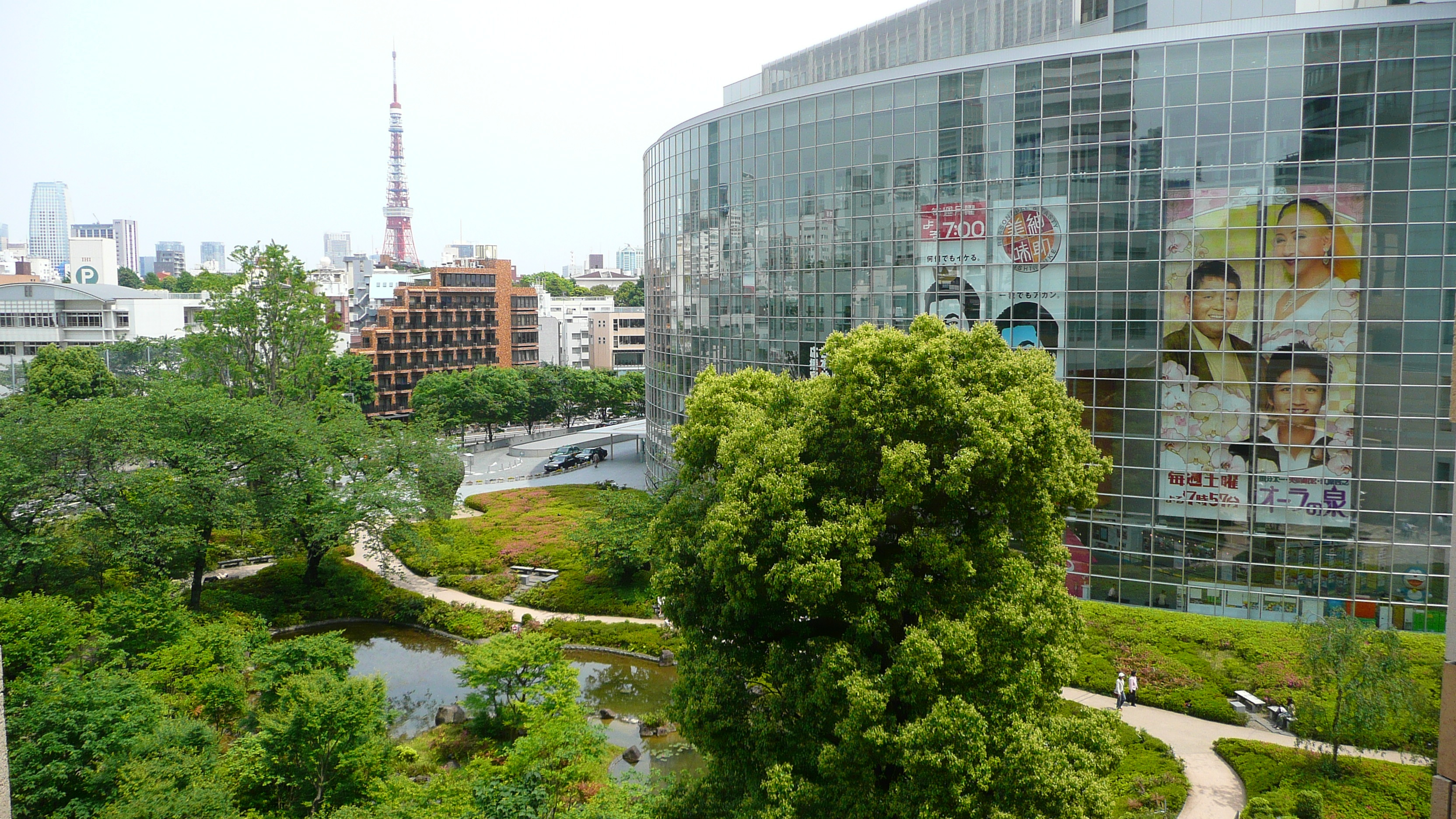
- Interactive map of the TV Asahi Building area

General information
- Location: Minato, Tokyo, Japan
- Coordinates: 35.6597°N 139.7310°E
- Construction started: March 2000; 26 years ago
- Completed: March 2003; 23 years ago
- Opened: September 29, 2003; 22 years ago
- Owner: TV Asahi

Design and construction
- Architect: Fumihiko Maki
- Architecture firm: Maki and Associates
- Main contractor: Takenaka Corporation

TV Asahi Building (テレビ朝日本社ビル, Terebi Asahi Honsha Biru) is 8-story office and TV studio building located in Roppongi, Minato, Tokyo, Japan. It houses the headquarters of TV Asahi and TV Asahi Holdings. The building was designed by architect Fumihiko Maki. Construction was finished in 2003.

TV Asahi Building is part of the Roppongi Hills complex. The main entrance atrium is open to visitors. The Mori Garden (毛利庭園), former mansion of the Mōri clan, is situated on the building.
