= 1st Division (Imperial Japanese Army) =

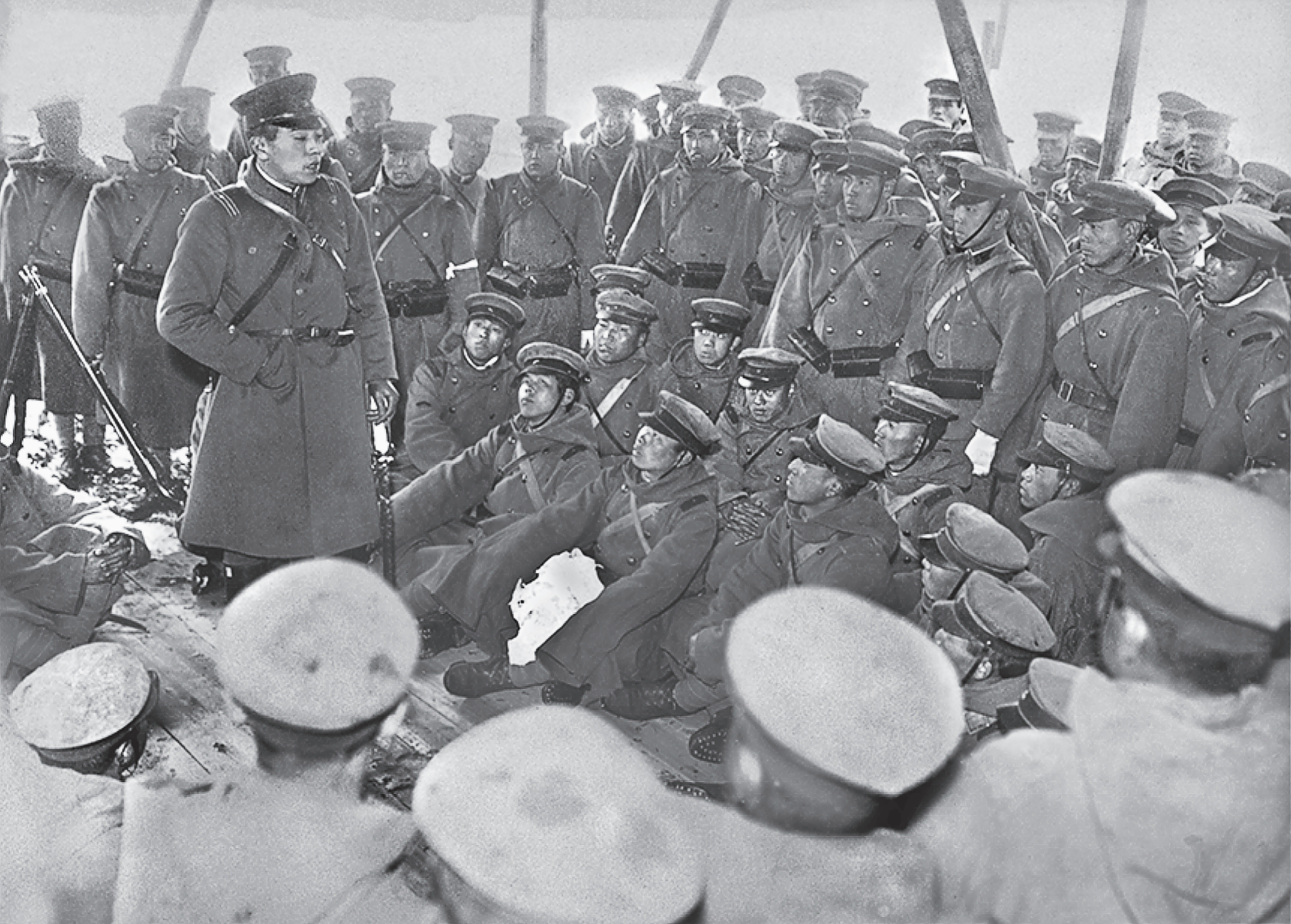
- Rebel 1st Division troops in the February 26 Incident
- Active: January 1871–1945
- Country: Empire of Japan
- Branch: Imperial Japanese Army
- Type: Infantry
- Garrison/HQ: Tokyo, Japan
- Nickname: Jade Division
- Engagements: First Sino-Japanese War; Russo-Japanese War; February 26 incident Soviet–Japanese border conflicts: Kanchazu Island incident; Battle of Khalkhin Gol; World War II: Battle of Leyte; Battle of Luzon; Battle for Cebu City

Commanders
- Notable commanders: Shigeomi Miyoshi; Yasukata Oku; Kageaki Kawamura; Prince Fushimi Sadanaru; Prince Kan'in Kotohito; Hyoe Ichinohe; Yoshinori Shirakawa; Jinzaburō Masaki

The 1st Division (第1師団, Dai-ichi shidan) was an infantry division in the Imperial Japanese Army. Its tsūshōgō was the Jade Division (玉兵団, Tama-heidan). The 1st Division was formed in Tokyo in January 1871 as the Tokyo Garrison (東京鎮台, Tōkyō chindai), one of six regional commands created in the fledgling Imperial Japanese Army. The Tokyo Garrison had responsibility for the eastern region of Honshū (Kantō region), centered on the Tokyo metropolitan area. The six regional commands were transformed into divisions under the army reorganization of 14 May 1888, based on recommendations by the Prussian military advisor Jakob Meckel to the Japanese government.

== History ==
As one of the oldest divisions in the Imperial Japanese Army, the 1st Division saw combat in the First Sino-Japanese War and the Russo-Japanese War.

After the wars, the division returned to Tokyo, with permanent headquarters opened in Minami-Aoyama 15 June 1918. The February 26 Incident was an attempted coup d'état staged by elements of the 1st Division in Tokyo in 1936. As the situation on the Soviet border was still volatile because of the ongoing Soviet–Japanese border conflicts, the 1st Division was soon sent to Manchukuo-Soviet border under the command of the Kwantung Army. The division participated in the Kanchazu Island incident, successfully driving off Soviet invaders by 30 June 1937. On 1 September 1937, the 101st Division was created to garrison Tokyo instead of the 1st Division. Later, parts of the 1st Division participated in the disastrous Nonomhan Incident in 1939.

During 1944, the division was reassigned to the Philippines to participate in the Pacific War, and initially based in Manila, where it formed the core of General Tomoyuki Yamashita's 14th Area Army. Ordered to oppose the re-occupation of Leyte by the American and Filipino forces, the 1st Division landed at Ormoc City on the west coast of Leyte on 1 November 1944. Their orders were to move up Leyte Highway Number 2 to Carigara and to secure the northern half of the island. However, American and Filipino forces had already seized Carigara, and American air strikes had deprived the Japanese 1st Division of its supply chain and reinforcements. Unable to reach Carigara, the Japanese fortified hilltops and ridges along the highway, and defended these areas against the American and Philippine Commonwealth military offensive from 7 November though 12 December 1944 in fierce combat, including fighting in the middle of a typhoon. By the time the Battle of Leyte was won by American and Filipino forces, of the 11,000 Japanese soldiers, only 800 were evacuated to Cebu in January 1945. As result, the 1st Division ceased to exist as an operational unit. The remnants of the division fought in the Battle for Cebu City.

== See also ==
- List of Japanese Infantry Divisions

== Reference and further reading ==
- Madej, W. Victor, Japanese Armed Forces Order of Battle, 1937–1945 [2 vols], Allentown, Pennsylvania: 1981
- Morison, Samuel Eliot. History of United States Naval Operations in World War II. Vol. 13: The Liberation of the Philippines—Luzon, Mindanao, the Visayas, 1944–1945 University of Illinois Press (2002), ISBN 0-252-07064-X
- Vego Milan N. Battle for Leyte, 1944 : Allied And Japanese Plans, Preparations, And Execution. Naval Institute Press, 2006. ISBN 1-55750-885-2
- This article incorporates material from the Japanese Wikipedia page 第1師団 (日本軍), accessed 8 March 2016
