= Konstantinovsky District, Amur Oblast =

Konstantinovsky District Константиновский район (Russian)
- District
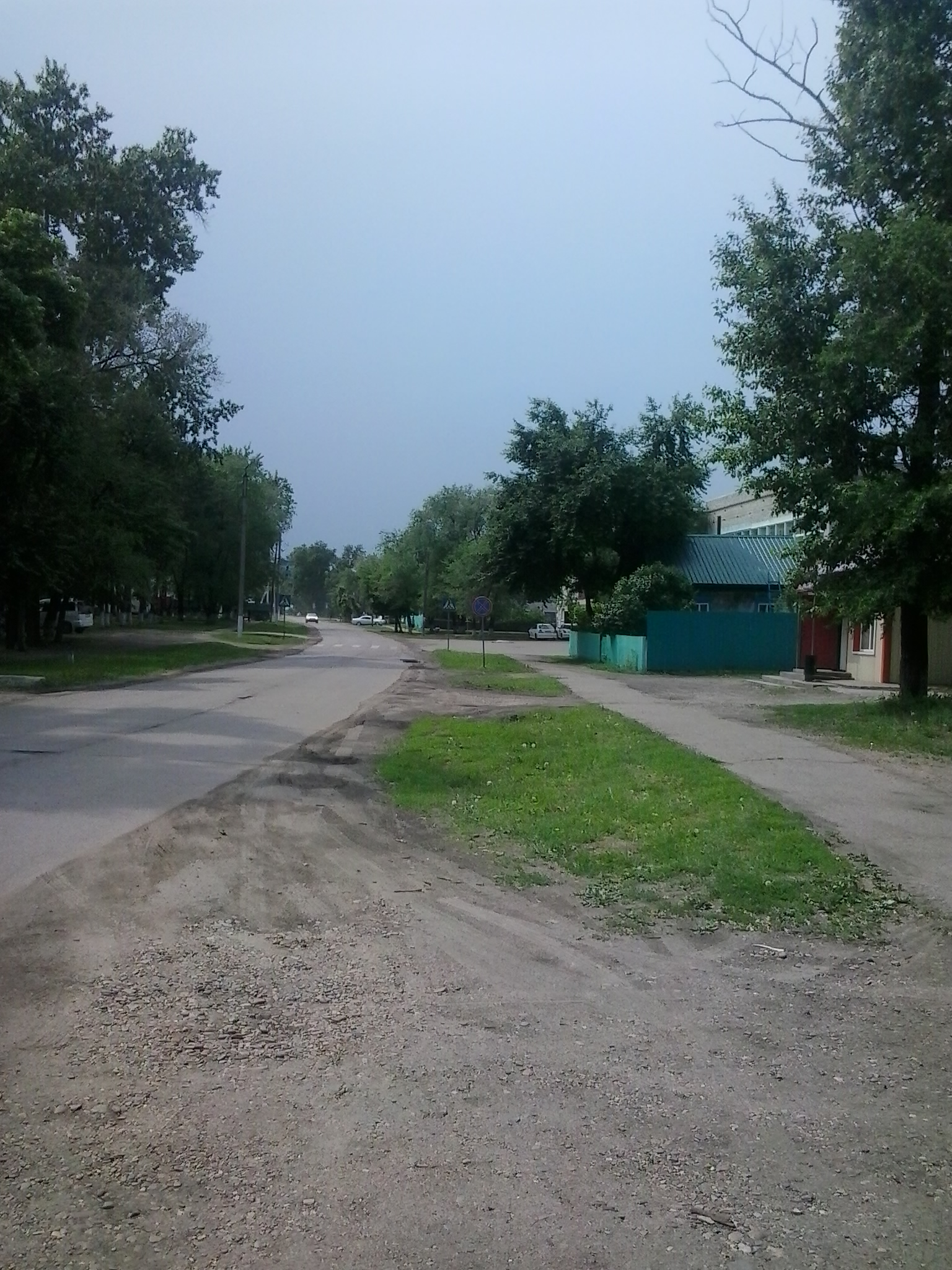
- Lenina, Konstantinovsky District

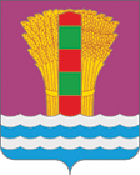
- Flag Coat of arms
- Location of Konstantinovsky District in Amur Oblast
- Coordinates: 49°37′N 127°59′E
- Country: Russia
- Federal subject: Amur Oblast
- Established: 1944
- Administrative center: Konstantinovka

Area
  - Total: 1,816 km^{2} (701 sq mi)

Population (2010 Census)
  - Total: 12,986
  - Density: 7.151/km^{2} (18.52/sq mi)
  - Urban: 0%
  - Rural: 100%

Administrative structure
  - Administrative divisions: 11 Rural settlements
  - Inhabited localities: 16 rural localities

Municipal structure
  - Municipally incorporated as: Konstantinovsky Municipal District
  - Municipal divisions: 0 urban settlements, 11 rural settlements
- Time zone: UTC+9 (MSK+6)
- OKTMO ID: 10630000
- Website: http://www.konst.amsu.ru

Konstantinovsky District (Russian: Константи́новский райо́н) is an administrative and municipal district (raion), one of the twenty in Amur Oblast, Russia. The area of the district is 1,816 square kilometers (701 sq mi). Its administrative center is the rural locality (a selo) of Konstantinovka. Population: 12,986 (2010 census); 14,847 (2002 Census); 16,710 (1989 Soviet census). The population of Konstantinovka accounts for 41.0% of the district's total population.
