= Konstantinovka, Amur Oblast =

Village in Amur Oblast, Russia

Coordinates: 49.616°N 127.988°E

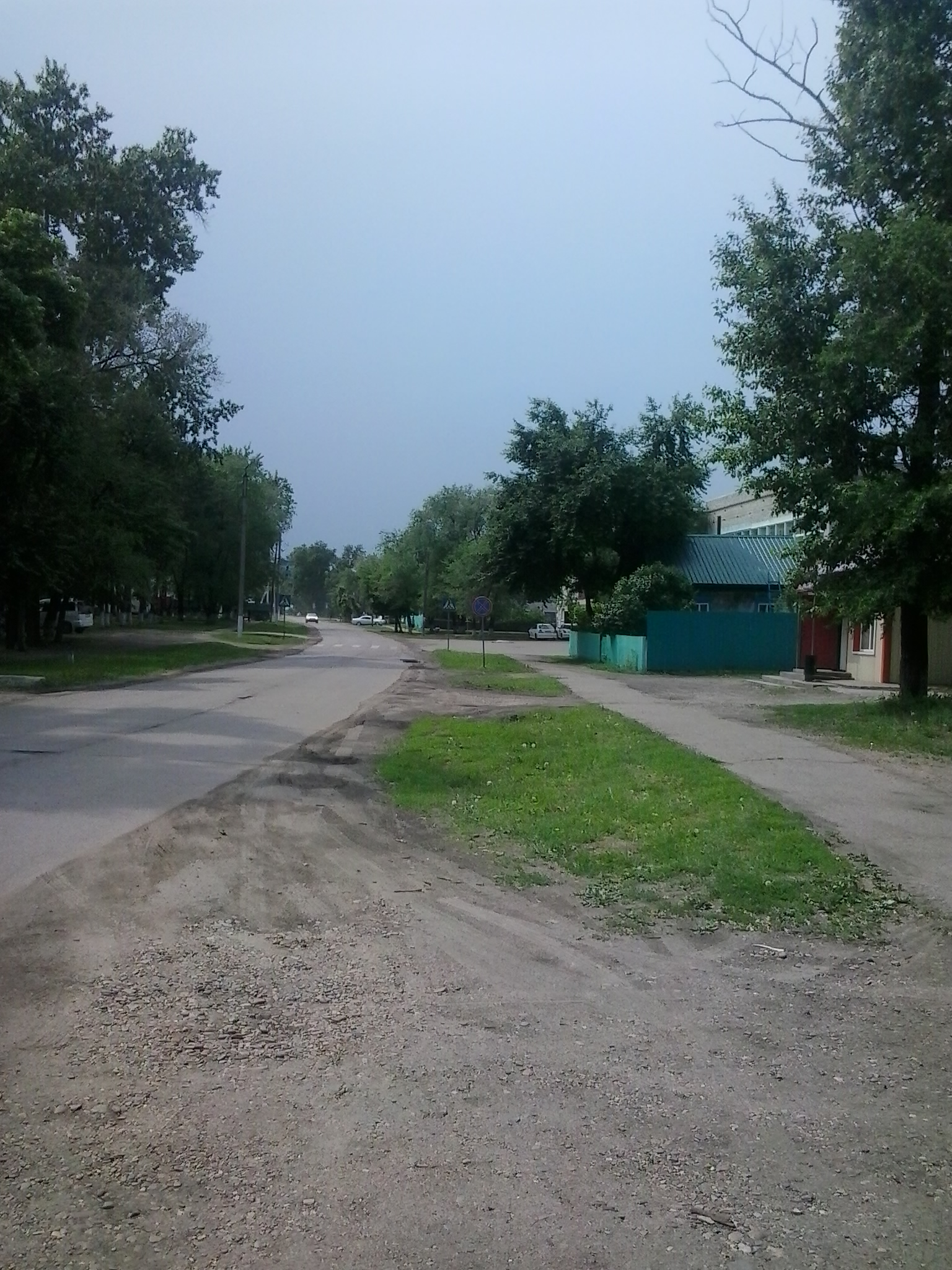
Lenin street in Konstantinovka

Konstantinovka (Russian: Константи́новка) is a rural locality (a selo) and the administrative center of Konstantinovsky District of Amur Oblast, Russia. Population: 5,329 (2010 census); 5,930 (2002 census); 6,637 (1989 Soviet census).

== See also ==
- Sixty-Four Villages East of the River
