= Station Hotel =

A station hotel often refers to a railway hotel.

Station Hotel may also refer to:

- Royal Station Hotel, a hotel in York, England
- Station Hotel, Altrincham, a public house in Greater Manchester, England
- Station Hotel, Dudley, a hotel and banqueting suite in the West Midlands, England
- Station Hotel, Perth, a hotel in Perth and Kinross, Scotland
- Tokyo Station Hotel, a boutique hotel in Marunouchi, Tokyo, Japan
