= Tokyo Station =

Major railway and metro station in Japan

Coordinates: 35°40′51″N 139°46′01″E

Tokyo Station 東京駅
- Tokyo Station's Marunouchi side in June 2023

General information
- Other names: Tokyo Central Station
- Location: Chiyoda, Tokyo; Japan
- Operator: JR East; JR Central; Tokyo Metro
- Connections: Bus terminal

History
- Opened: December 20, 1914; 111 years ago (JGR); March 20, 1956; 70 years ago (Tokyo Metro)
Location
- Location within Tokyo Yamanote Loop Location within Tokyo wards area Location within Kanto Area Location within Japan

Tokyo Station (Japanese: 東京駅, Hepburn: Tōkyō-eki; pronounced [to̞ːkʲo̞ːe̞kʲi]) is a major railway station and a central rail hub in Chiyoda, Tokyo, Japan. The original station is located in Chiyoda's Marunouchi business district near the Imperial Palace grounds. The newer Eastern extension is not far from the Ginza commercial district. Due to the large area covered by the station, it is divided into the Marunouchi (west) and Yaesu (east) sides in its directional signage.

The station opened in 1914 as an integrated terminus for the present-day Tōkaidō Line, Tōhoku Line, and later the Chūō Line, which previously had separate termini in Tokyo. Since then, it has served as the main terminus for inter-city trains departing Tokyo westwards. The station was badly damaged during the Bombing of Tokyo on 25 May 1945 but soon resumed service. The Tōkaidō Shinkansen, the world's first dedicated high-speed rail system, opened between the station and Osaka in 1964. With the extension of northbound Shinkansen lines from Ueno in 1991, the station also became a gateway to northeast Japan.

Served by the high-speed rail lines of the Shinkansen network, Tokyo Station is the main inter-city rail terminal in Tokyo. It is the busiest station in Japan in terms of scheduled trains, with more than 4,000 trains arriving and departing daily. and also ranks both seventh busiest in Japan and ninth in the world in terms of passenger throughput; on average, more than 500,000 people use Tokyo Station every day. The station is also served by many regional commuter lines of Japan Railways, as well as the Tokyo Metro network.

== Overview ==
Tokyo Station serves as the interchange station for both conventional and Shinkansen lines. The station is served by many railway lines operated by JR East. For conventional lines, the station is the terminus of the Tōkaidō Main Line, the Chūō Main Line, Keiyō Line, and the Sōbu Main Line. The station is also served by the Ueno–Tokyo Line, Keihin–Tōhoku Line, Yamanote Line, rapid services of Sōbu Line and Yokosuka Line.

The station is also directly connected to two Shinkansen lines: the Tōhoku Shinkansen, operated by JR East and the Tokaido Shinkansen, operated by JR Central. Shinkansen trains from other lines also service the station via these two lines. The services from Yamagata Shinkansen, Akita Shinkansen, which are Mini-Shinkansen lines, connect to Tokyo Station via the Tōhoku Shinkansen. Jōetsu Shinkansen and Hokuriku Shinkansen services also operate from Tokyo Station. Hokkaido Shinkansen services operated by JR Hokkaido also run on Tohoku Shinkansen tracks to service Tokyo Station. Tokyo Metro's Marunouchi Line serves the station as well.

The station is linked by underground passageways to the Ōtemachi underground (subway) station complex served by the Tōzai, Chiyoda, Hanzōmon, and Mita subway lines.

It is also possible to walk to the Nijūbashimae, Hibiya, Yūrakuchō, Ginza, and Higashi-ginza Stations completely underground (the last a distance of over 2 km (1.2 mi)), but these stations can usually be reached more quickly by train.

Tokyo Station is also a major intercity bus terminal, with regular midday service to several cities in the Kantō region and overnight service to the Kansai and Tōhoku regions. The furthest overnight bus service goes to Izumo-Taisha, over 800 km (500 mi) away.

== History ==
=== Planning and construction, 1872–1914 ===
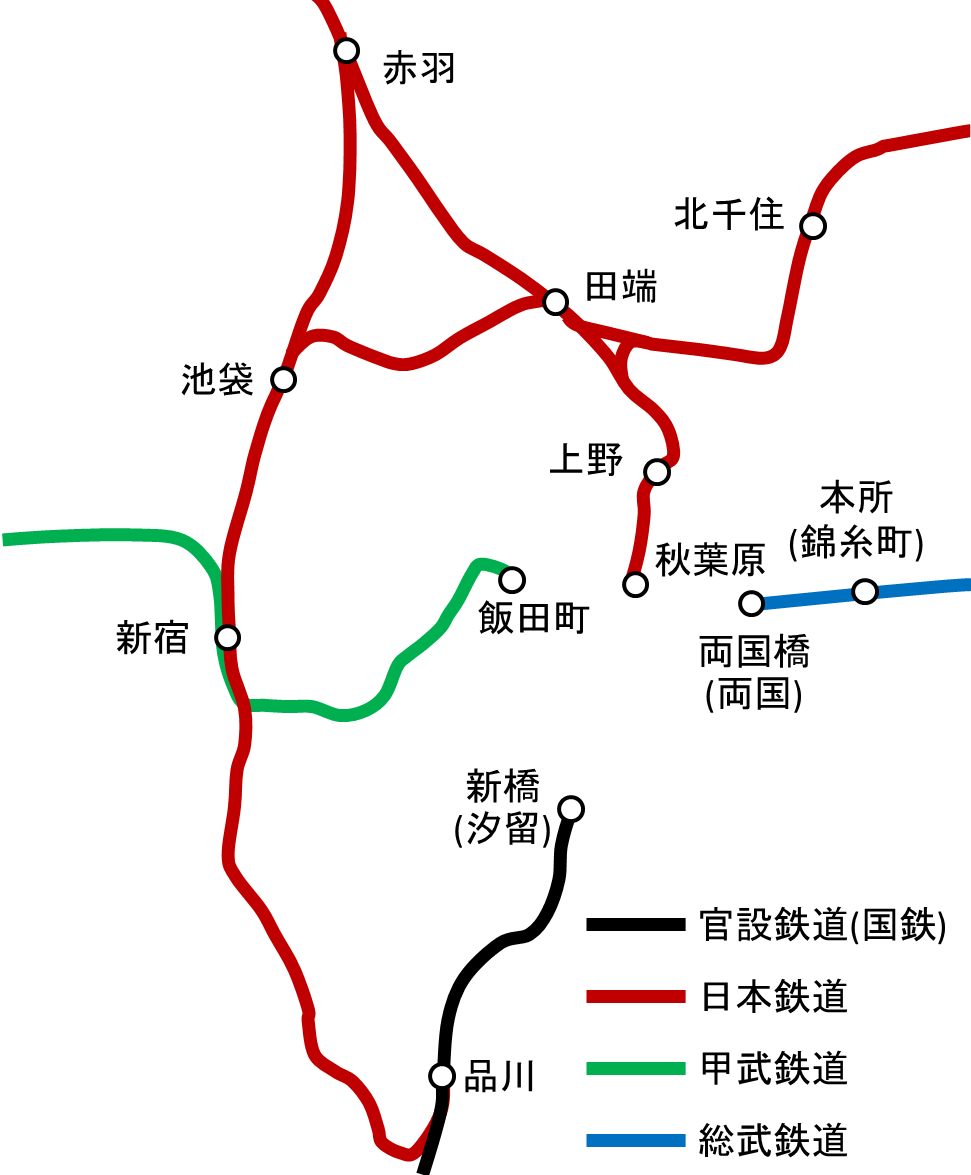
Tokyo's mainline railway network in 1904, a decade before the opening of Tokyo Station; the station was constructed as an integrated terminus for these lines.

In 1889, a Tokyo municipal committee drew up plans for an elevated railway line connecting the Tōkaidō Main Line terminal at Shinbashi to the Nippon Railway (now Tōhoku Main Line) terminal at Ueno. The Imperial Diet resolved in 1896 to construct a new station on this line called Central Station (中央停車場, Chūō Teishajō), located directly in front of the gardens of the Imperial Palace.

Construction was delayed by the outbreak of the First Sino-Japanese War and Russo-Japanese War, but finally commenced in 1908. The three-story station building was designed by architect Tatsuno Kingo (who also designed Manseibashi Station and the nearby Bank of Japan building) as a restrained celebration of Japan's costly victory in the Russo-Japanese War. The building is often mentioned in guidebooks to be fashioned after Amsterdam Centraal station in the Netherlands. This is in dispute, as it has a similarity to a family of other railway station buildings built at the beginning of the twentieth century. Terunobu Fujimori, a scholar of Western architecture, also refutes the rumor, having studied Tatsuno's styles as well as the building itself.

=== Early days, 1914–1941 ===
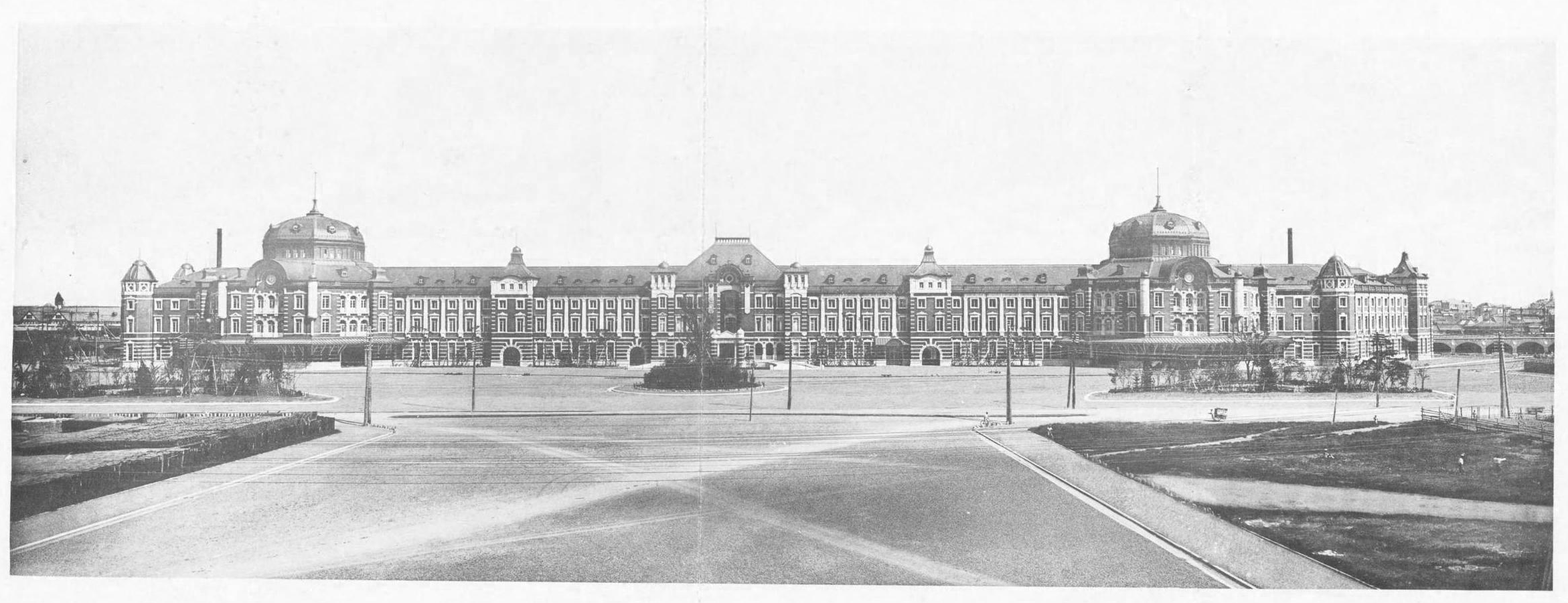
Original brick Tokyo Station (Marunouchi Building) in 1914

Tokyo Station opened on December 20, 1914, with four platforms; two serving electric trains (current Yamanote/Keihin–Tōhoku Line platforms) and two serving non-electric trains (current Tōkaidō Line platforms). With the opening of Tokyo Station, the old Shinbashi Station, which had served as the Tokyo-side terminus of the Tōkaidō Line since 1872, was closed as a passenger station. After the final train departed from the old Shinbashi Station at 12:23 AM on the opening day, a special train transported staff and equipment to Tokyo Station. Using the transferred staff and equipment, the first train departed from Tokyo Station at 5:23 AM. The opening ceremony was attended by the Prime Minister, the Mayor of Tokyo, the Minister of Railways, and the war hero Mitsuomi Kamio, 1st Baron, who had defeated the Germans in the Siege of Tsingtao a month earlier. Kamio arrived at the station from Osaka by train.

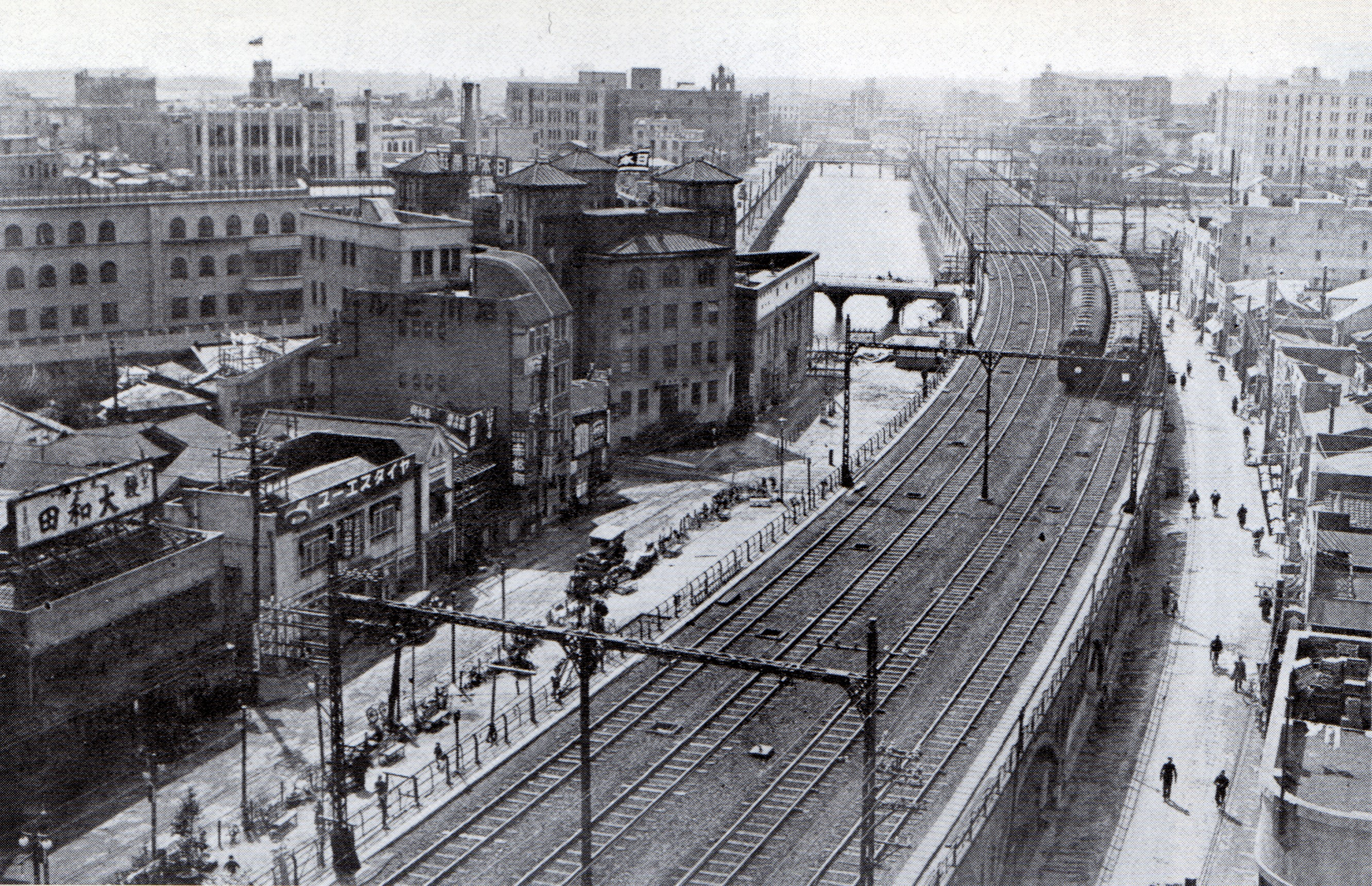
Yamanote Line trains running between Tokyo and Yūrakuchō in 1931

The Tokyo Station Hotel opened in the Marunouchi-side building on November 2, 1915. The Chūō Main Line extension to the station was completed in 1919 and originally stopped at the platform now used by northbound Yamanote/Keihin–Tōhoku trains. During this early era, the station only had gates on the Marunouchi side, with the north side serving as an exit and the south side serving as an entrance. The central gate was exclusively for members of the Imperial Family. On November 4, 1921, Prime Minister Hara Takashi was stabbed to death by an 18-year-old right-wing railway switchman in front of the south wing as he arrived to board a train for Kyoto.

The Great Kantō Earthquake struck Tokyo on September 1, 1923, causing immense damage to the city. However, the station sustained little damage. By September 3, 7,925 evacuees had taken shelter at the station. The Yaesu side of the station opened in 1929. In October 1930, the superexpress Tsubame began service, connecting Tokyo Station and Kobe Station. The nickname superexpress was given because it reduced travel time between the two stations by over two hours. Although the Tōkaidō Line was electrified between Tokyo and Kōzu, Class C51 steam locomotives were used for the entire route to avoid engine changes. On November 14, 1930, Osachi Hamaguchi was shot by a member of the Aikokusha ultra-nationalist secret society. He survived the attack but died of his wounds in August the following year. By 1935, it became clear that passenger demand had exceeded the station's capacity. For instance, the Yamanote and Keihin Tohoku line services operated at intervals of just one minute and forty seconds. As a result, it was decided to relocate the railway yard to Shinagawa, while the freight terminus there would be moved to Shintsurumi to make room. Two new platforms were then built on the former railway yard site.

=== War damage and reconstruction, 1942–1950 ===
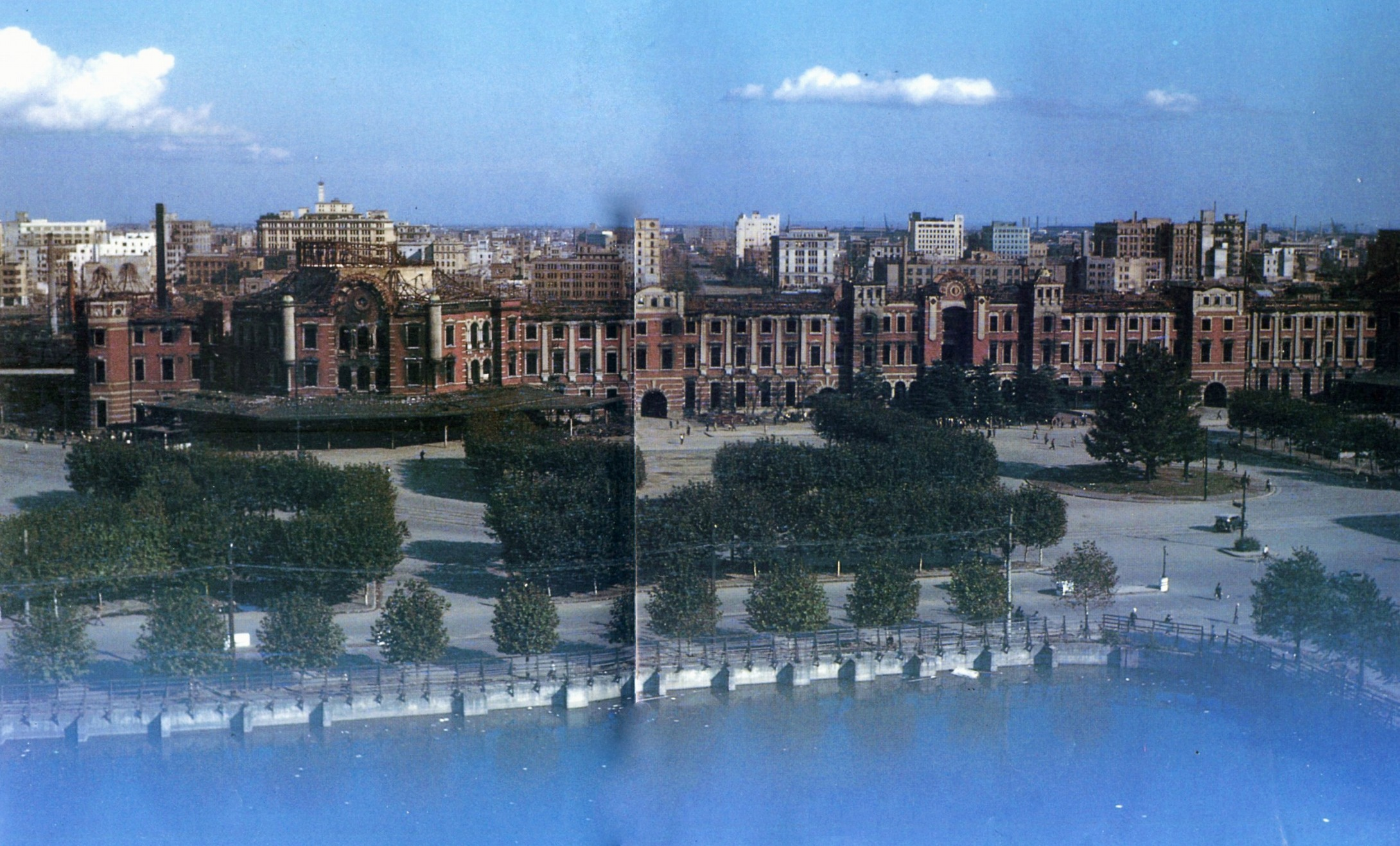
Tokyo Station in 1945 after the bombing

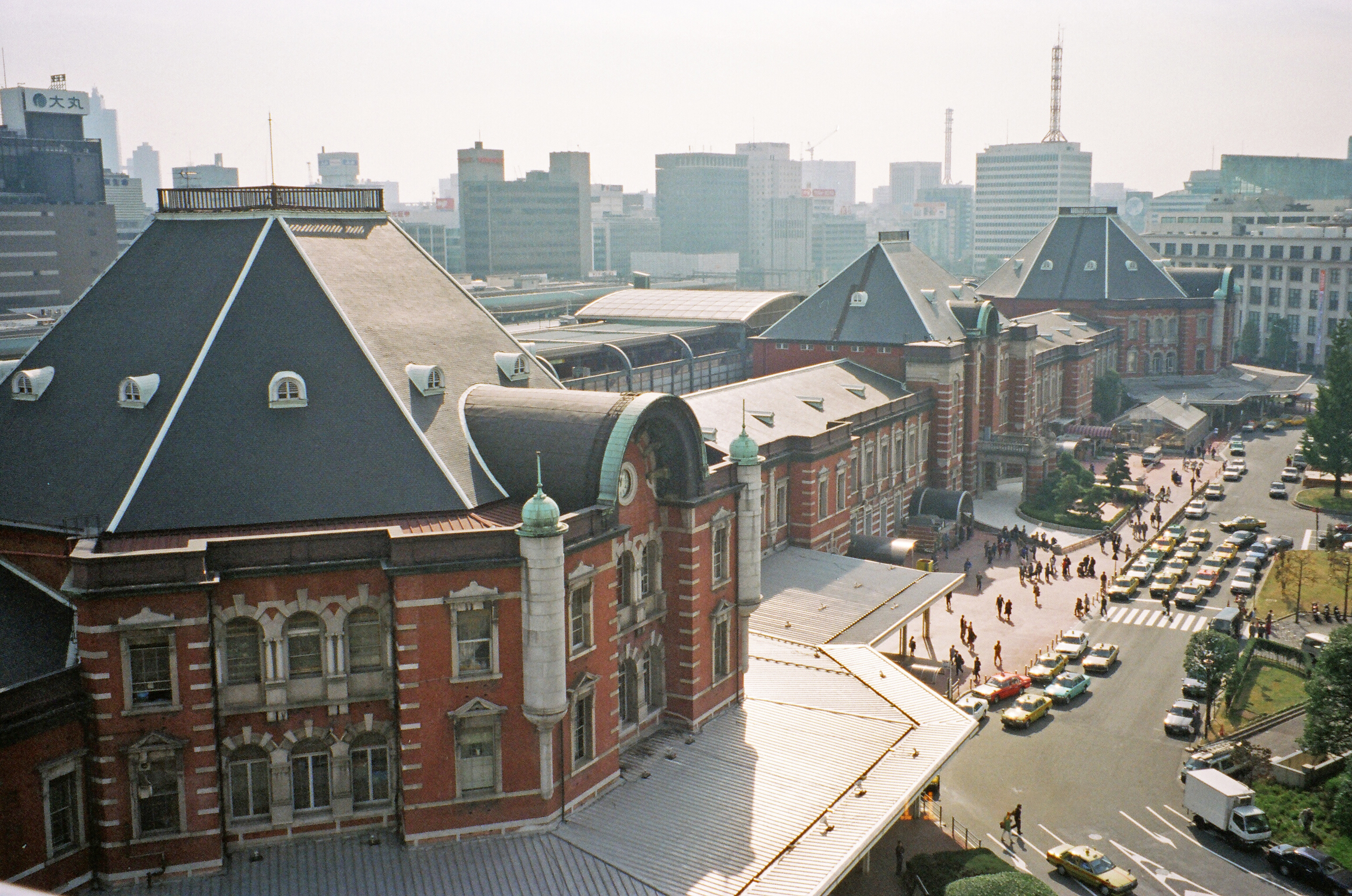
The building in its reconstructed form, photographed in 1997

Much of the station was destroyed in a B-29 firebombing raid on May 25, 1945. The bombing destroyed the rooftop domes, as well as most of the third floor of the building and much of the interior. The brick walls and concrete floors mostly survived. The state of the structure was evaluated by Tokyo University professor Kiyoshi Muto, and after consulting with the Ministry of Transport, it was decided to demolish much of the top floor to reduce the weight on the structure. Reconstruction of the building finished by 1947, but the restored building had only two stories instead of three, and simple angular roofs were built in place of the original domes. Those involved in the reconstruction work stated that the added structures were intended to be makeshift, so they did not mind covering all the ornaments on the platform-side walls of the building with a thick layer of mortar. These postwar alterations were blamed for creating the mistaken impression that the building was based on the Centraal station in Amsterdam. Plans in the 1980s to demolish the building and replace it with a larger structure were derailed by a preservation movement.

=== Postwar, 1950–2011 ===
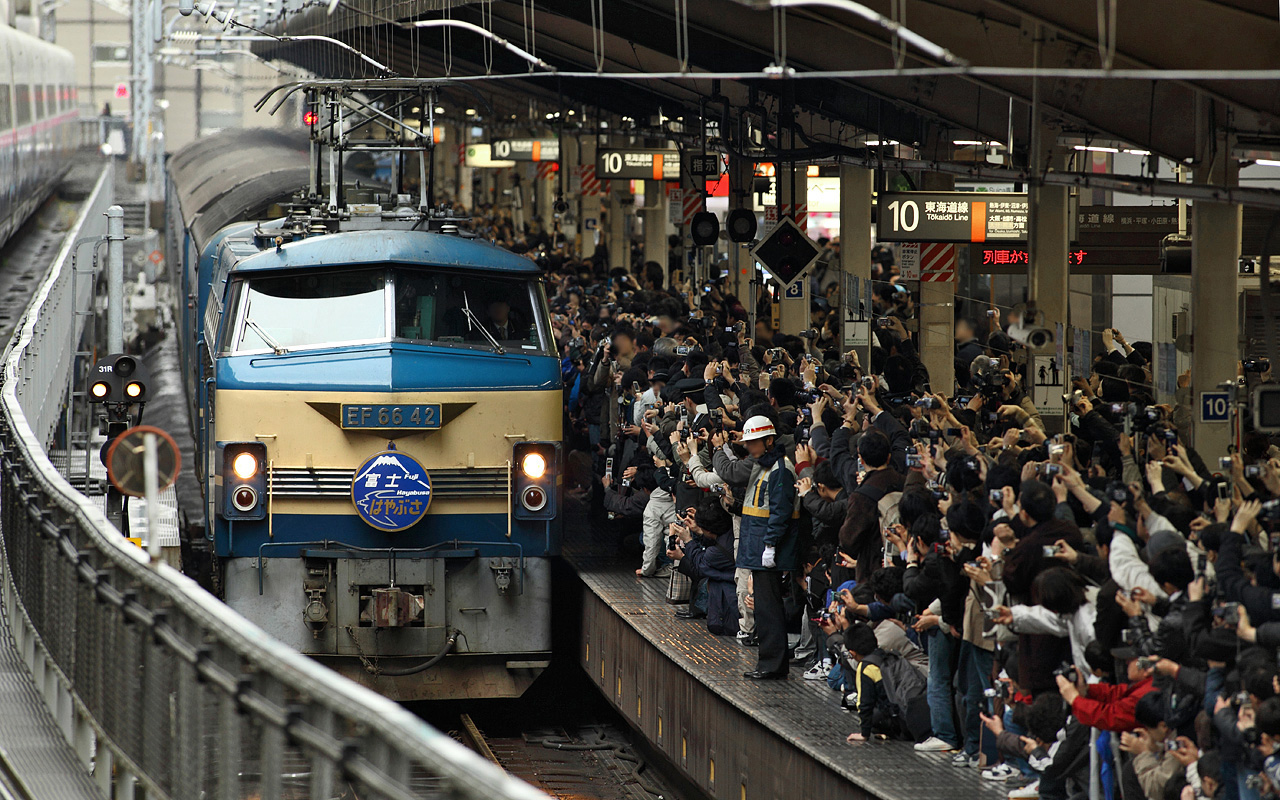
Various Blue Trains, which were westbound sleeper trains, operated between Tokyo Station and Kyushu from the 1950s.

On 15 September 1949, the Heiwa express train began operations between Tokyo and Osaka as the first post-war limited express service. Renamed Tsubame on 1 January 1950, it was later joined by the Hato. To eliminate locomotive, the 80 series EMUs were introduced between Tokyo and Numazu from 1 March 1950. Meanwhile, the Yankee Limited, a north-bound train for Allied forces, started in 1946 and transitioned to public use post-1952, later renamed Towada in 1954. The Yamanote and Keihin-Tohoku lines were separated as a solution to overcrowding, when additional tracks between Tokyo and Tamachi completed on 19 November 1956. The station's Yaesu exit, rebuilt after a 1949 fire, saw the construction of a modern station building completed in 1954 with Daimaru department store as the main tenant.

Electrification of the Tokaido Line was completed in 1956, and through trains to Osaka such as the Tsubame and Hato began to be hauled by EF58 electric locomotives for the entire length of the route. Night services to Kyushu, including the Asakaze, resumed, followed by the debut of the Kodama electric train service by 151 series EMUs in 1958. Steam locomotives ceased operations to Tokyo Station in 1961, when the Joban Line's electrification reached Katsuta. The Marunouchi Line reached Tokyo Station in 1956 and was extended to Ginza in 1957 by the Teito Rapid Transit Authority (TRTA).

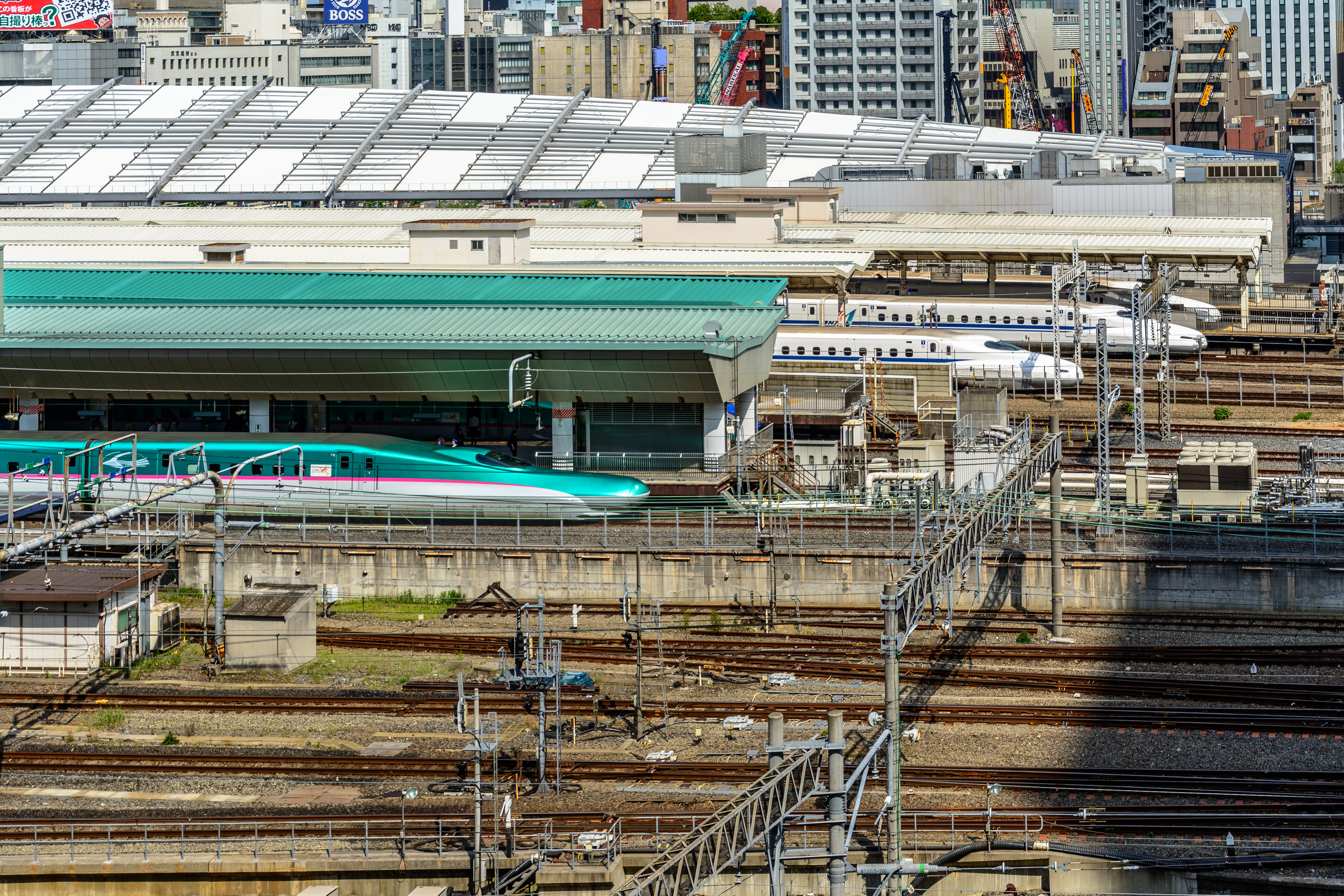
Beginning with the Tokaido Shinkansen in 1964, Tokyo Station has 10 platforms for the high-speed rail system today.

The Tokaido Shinkansen's construction began in 1959. There were concerns about increased congestion at Tokyo Station, but due to its central location in Tokyo and connectivity, Tokyo Station was selected as the line's Tokyo-side terminus. On 1 October 1964, the Tokaido Shinkansen opened, with Platforms 17–19 built for its operation. Later, one more platform was added when the Shinkansen extension to Hakata was completed in 1975.

The Sobu Line was connected to the newly built underground platforms at Tokyo Station in July 1972. Then, the Yokosuka Line was separated from the Tokaido Line and switched to an underground route that also leads to the underground platforms of the station in 1975. Since then, these lines have operated as one.

From July 1987, the station hosted a series of regular free public concerts referred to as "Tokyo Eki Kon" (Tokyo Station Concerts). These were first held as a celebration of the launch of Japan Railways Group as the privatized successor to the state-owned Japanese National Railways. Altogether 246 concerts were performed, but the event was discontinued when its popularity waned and the last concert took place in November 2000. The event returned in 2004 as the "Aka Renga (Red Brick) Concerts" but it was again suspended, after 19 concerts, when redevelopment of the station started in earnest. In 2012, as the reconstruction was nearing completion, there were calls for the concerts to resume.

In March 1990, the Keiyo Line was extended to Tokyo Station. To accommodate this new line, underground platforms were built under the Tokyo International Forum, which is 350 metres south of the station's main building. In June 1991, the northbound Shinkansen lines, which had initially terminated at Ōmiya in 1982 and extended to Ueno in 1985, reached Tokyo Station. That extension made Tokyo Station the Tokyo-side terminus for Tōhoku and Jōetsu Shinkansen services.

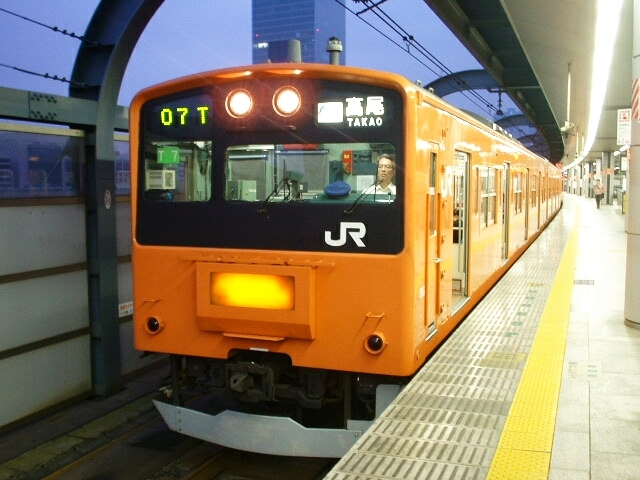
The current Chūō Line platforms were built in 1995.

When the first phase of the Hokuriku Shinkansen (then known as the Nagano Shinkansen) to Nagano was planned, it was decided to build additional Shinkansen platforms at Tokyo Station. To create space, all conventional train lines at Tokyo Station were shifted closer to the Marunouchi building by two tracks. New Chūō Line platforms were built above the tracks for the Yamanote and Keihin-Tohoku Lines in 1995. The Hokuriku Shinkansen section to Nagano opened on 1 October 1997, in time for the 1998 Winter Olympics held in Nagano.

The station facilities of the Marunouchi Line were inherited by Tokyo Metro after the privatization of the Teito Rapid Transit Authority (TRTA) in 2004.

=== Recent history, 2012–present ===
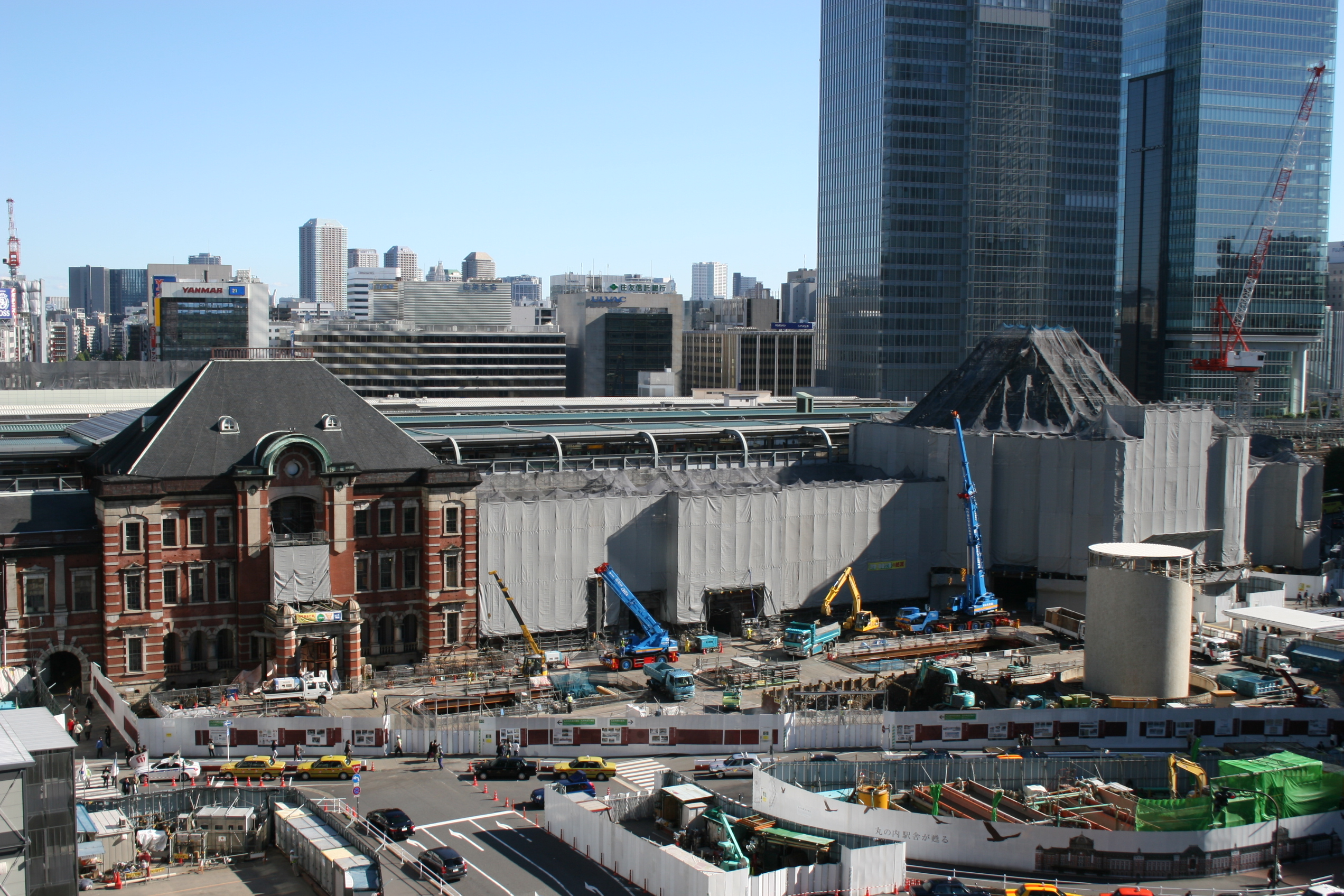
Renovation of Marunouchi side of station, November 2009

The Tokyo Station complex has undergone extensive development, including major improvements to the Marunouchi (west) and Yaesu (east) sides of the station. The Marunouchi side underwent an extensive five-year renovation, completed in October 2012, in which the historic 98-year-old façade on this side of the station was restored to its pre-war condition. The restoration work included recreating the two domes according to their original design. The surrounding area was converted into a broad plaza (Marunouchi Central Plaza) extending into a walkway toward the Imperial Palace, with space for bus and taxi ranks. In contrast, the Yaesu side of the station is very urban in appearance. The North and South GranTokyo towers are connected to the terminal by the GranRoof, a new commercial facility with a large canopy representing a "sail of light" which covers the outdoor areas. The high-rise towers include multi-story shopping areas and the offices of a number of leading companies and universities. This part of the project was completed in 2013.

Station numbering was introduced to the JR East commuter platforms in 2016 with Tokyo being assigned station numbers JT01 for the Tokaido Line, JU01 for the Utsunomiya/Takasaki lines, JK26 for the Keihin-Tōhoku line, JY01 for the Yamanote line, JC01 for the Chūō line rapid service, JO19 for both the Sōbu line rapid service as well as the adjoining Yokosuka line, and JE01 for the Keiyō line. At the same time, JR East assigned a three-letter code to their major interchange station; Tokyo was assigned the three-letter code "TYO".

== Station layout ==
A busy Tokyo Station from above in 2017

The main station facade on the Marunouchi side is made primarily of bricks, and partly dates back to the station's opening in 1914. The main station consists of ten island platforms serving twenty tracks, raised above street level and running in a north–south direction. The main concourse runs east–west below the platforms.

The historic station building on the Marunouchi side also contains Tokyo Station Gallery, an art museum in the station's North Dome.

The Shinkansen lines are on the Yaesu side of the station, along with a multi-storey Daimaru department store. The entrances nearest to the Shinkansen lines are named Yaesu, and those at the extreme east of the station are named Nihonbashi.

On the far west side is the Marunouchi entrances, which are closest to the two underground Sōbu/Yokosuka line platforms serving four tracks (five stories below ground level). The Narita Express to Narita International Airport uses these platforms.

The two Keiyō Line platforms serving four tracks are four stories below ground some hundreds of meters to the south of the main station with moving walkways to serve connecting passengers.

The whole complex is linked by an extensive system of underground passageways that merge with surrounding commercial buildings and shopping centers.

Tokyo Station

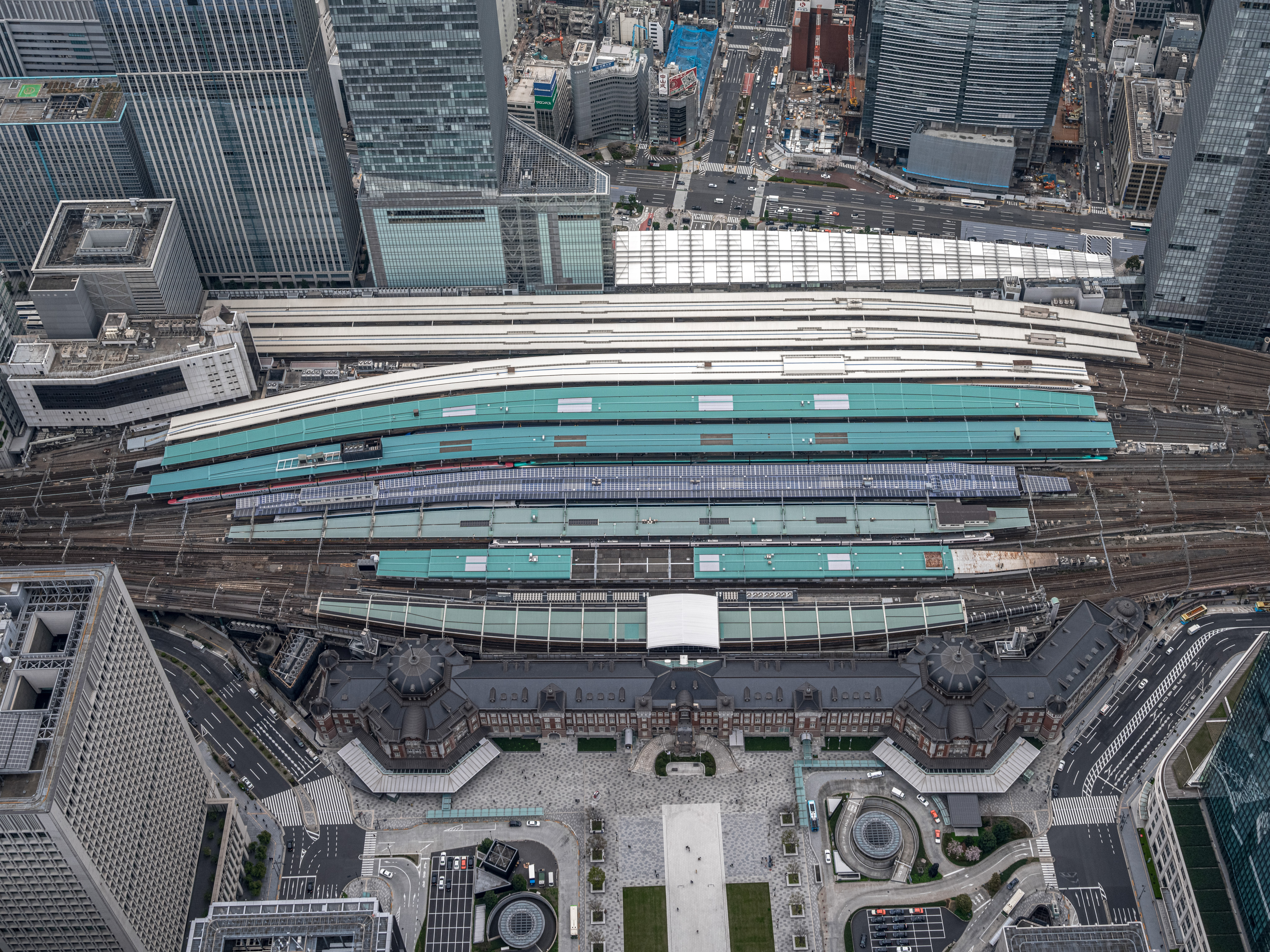
Tokyo station seen from the sky in 2021

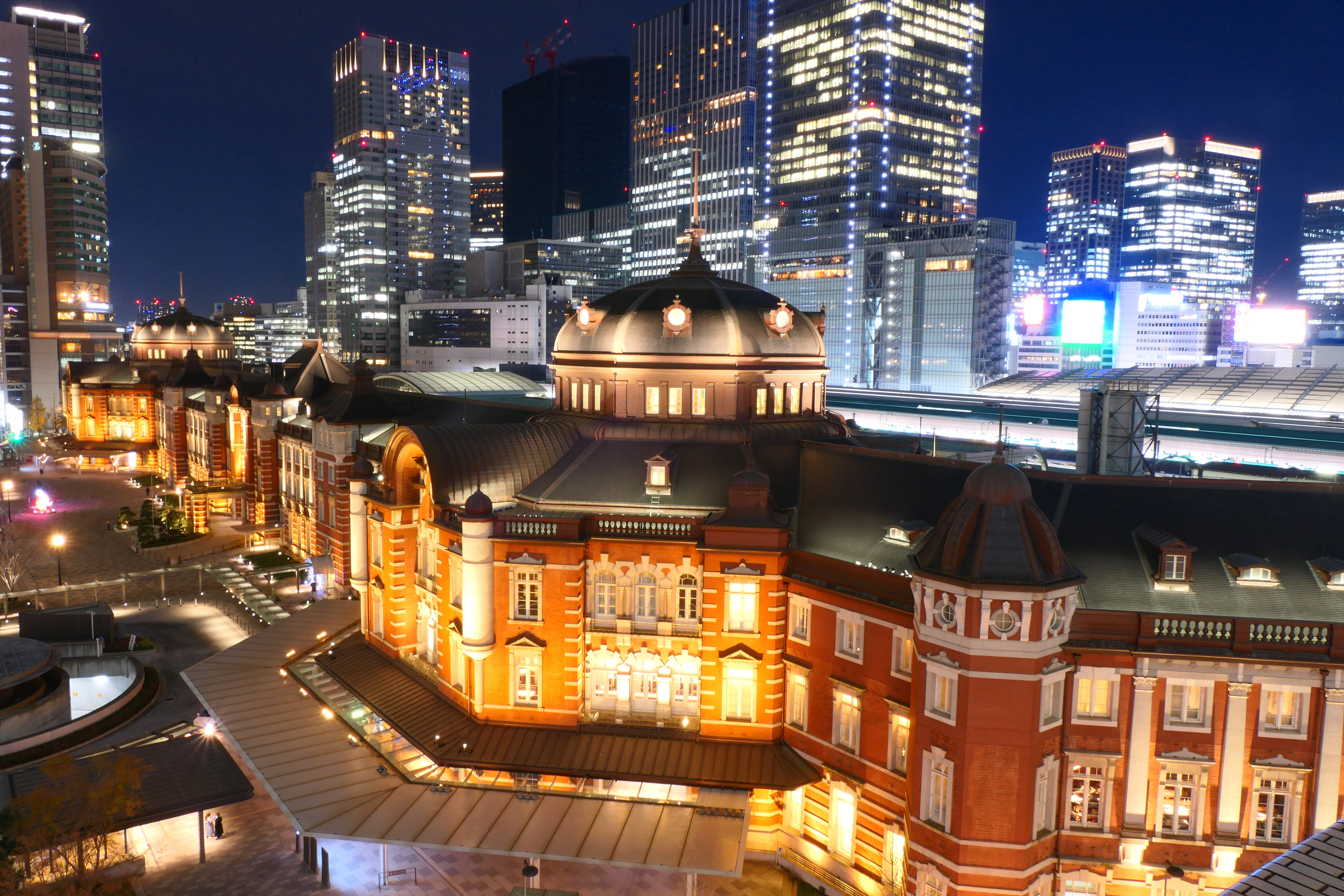
Tokyo Station night view in 2020

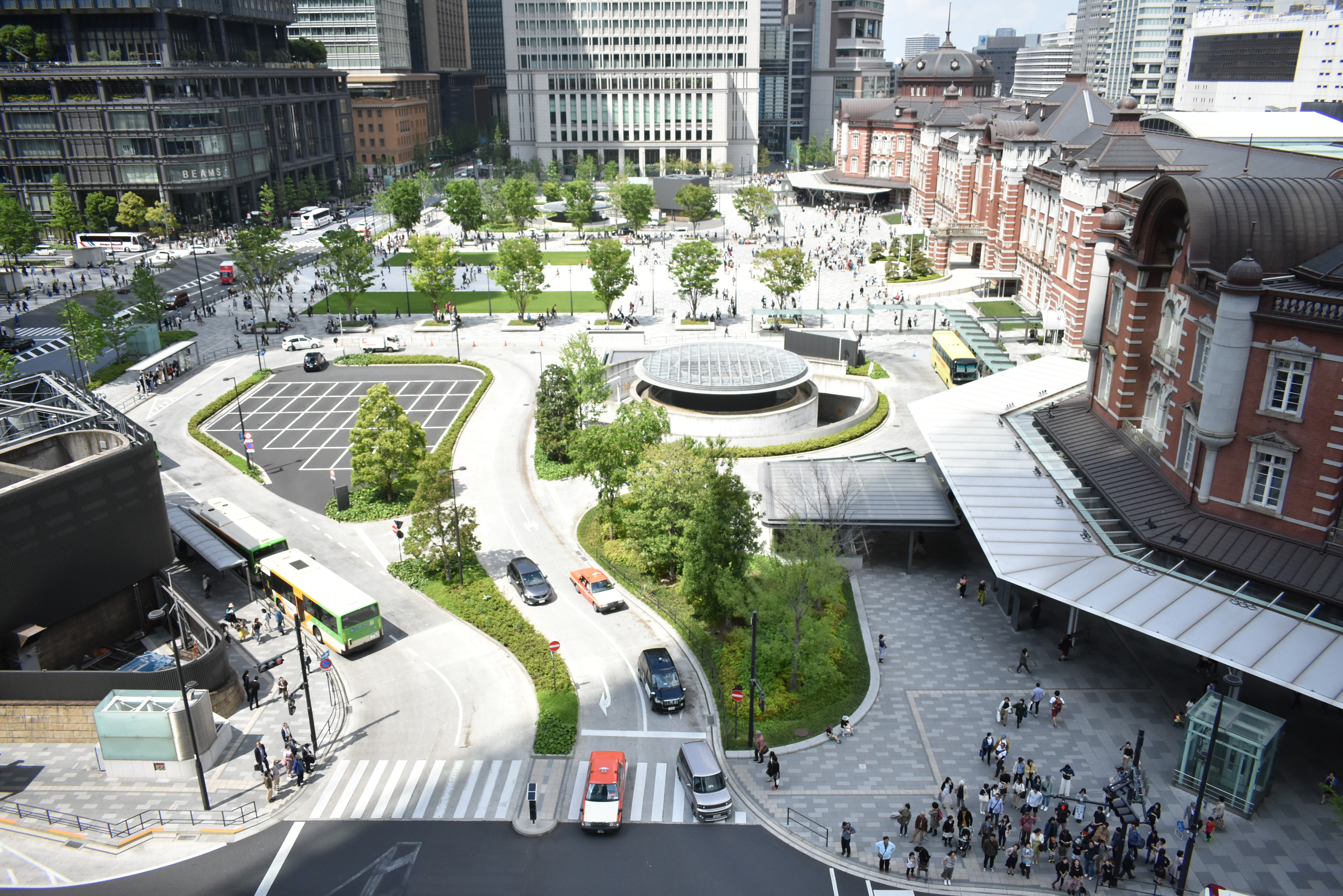
Tokyo Station Marunouchi Station Square in 2019

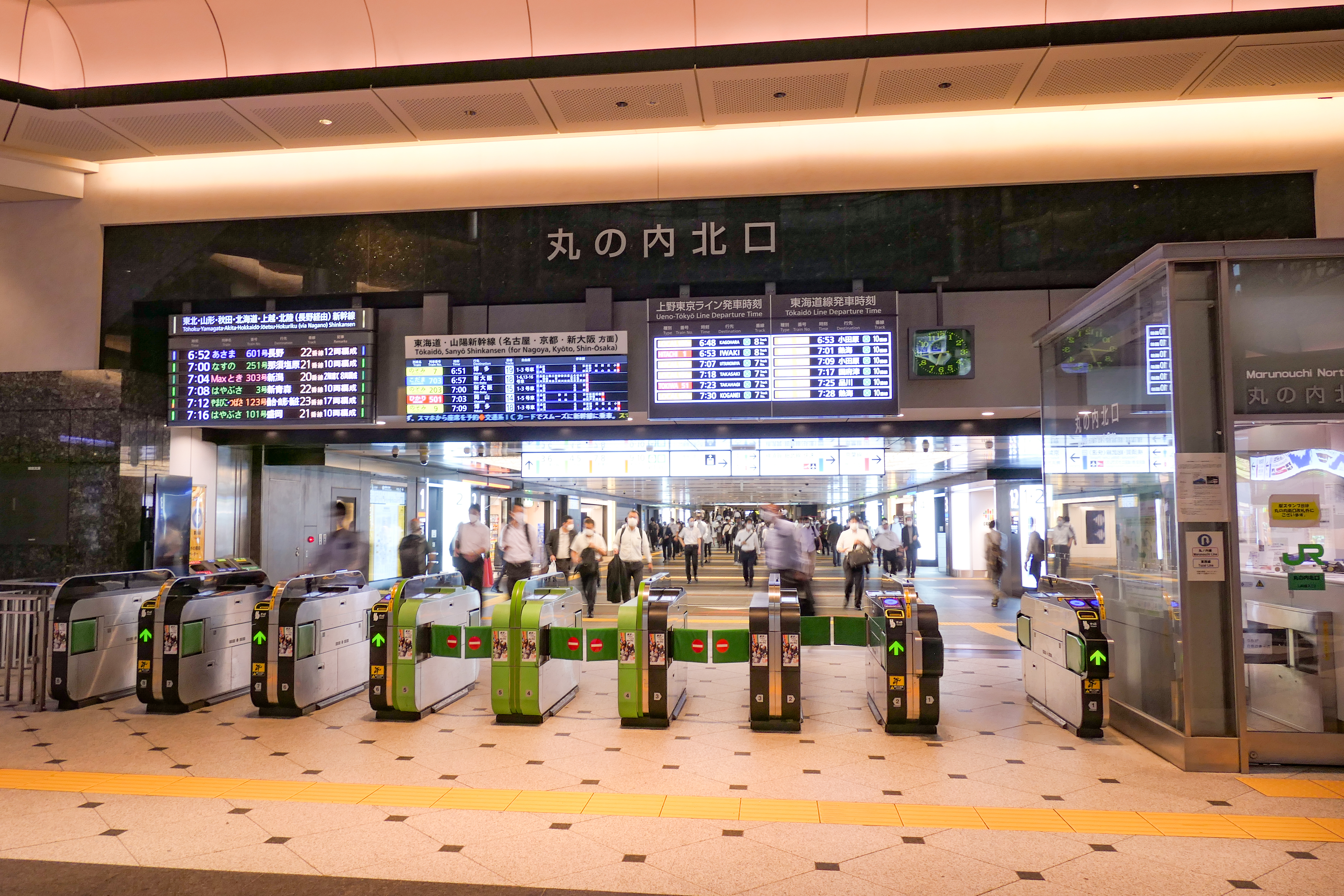
Marunouchi North Exit ticket gate in 2021

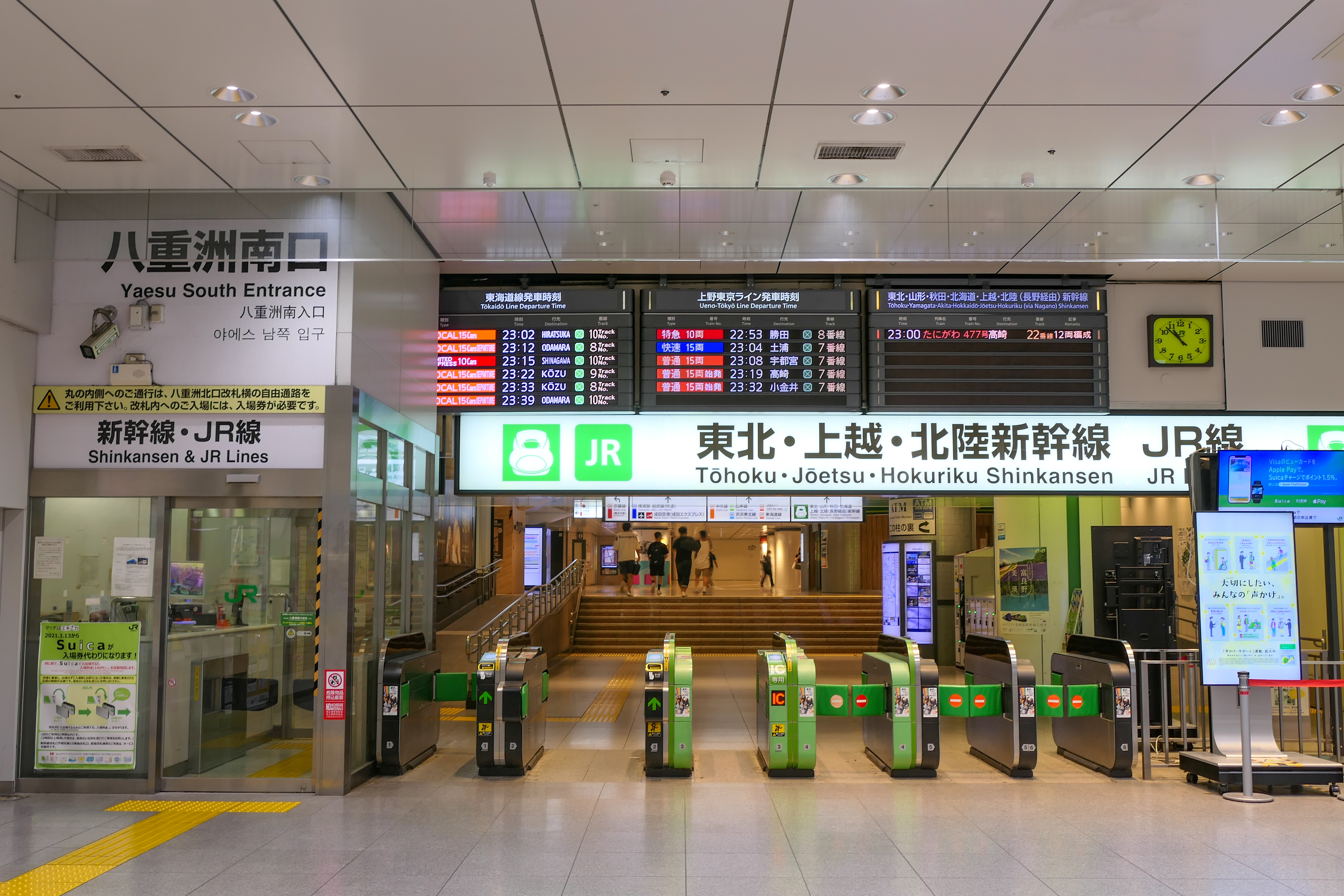
Yaesu South Exit ticket gate in 2021

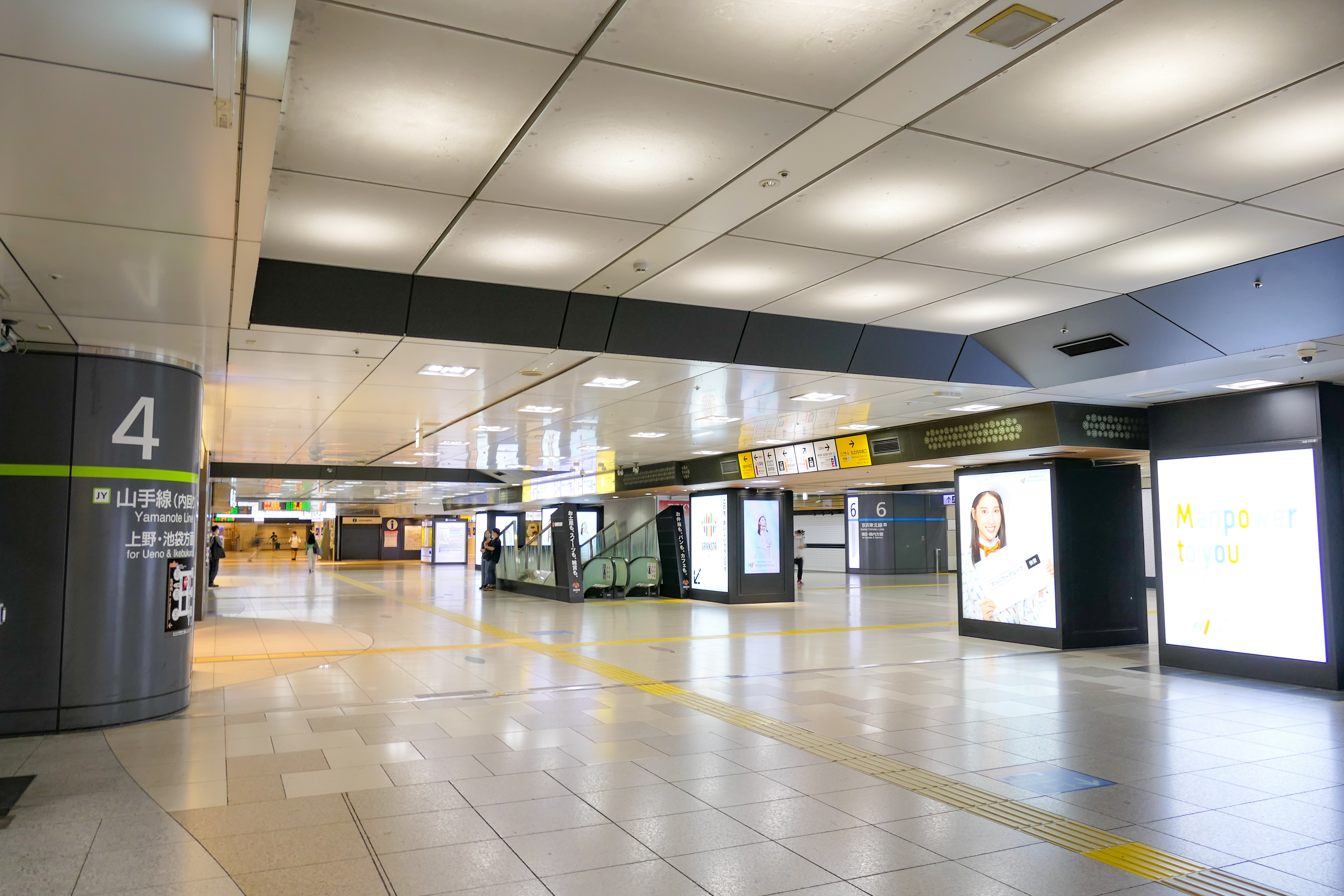
Concourse of JR East in 2021

== JR ==
TYOJT01 JU01 JK26 JY01 JC01 JO19 JE01 Tokyo Station 東京駅
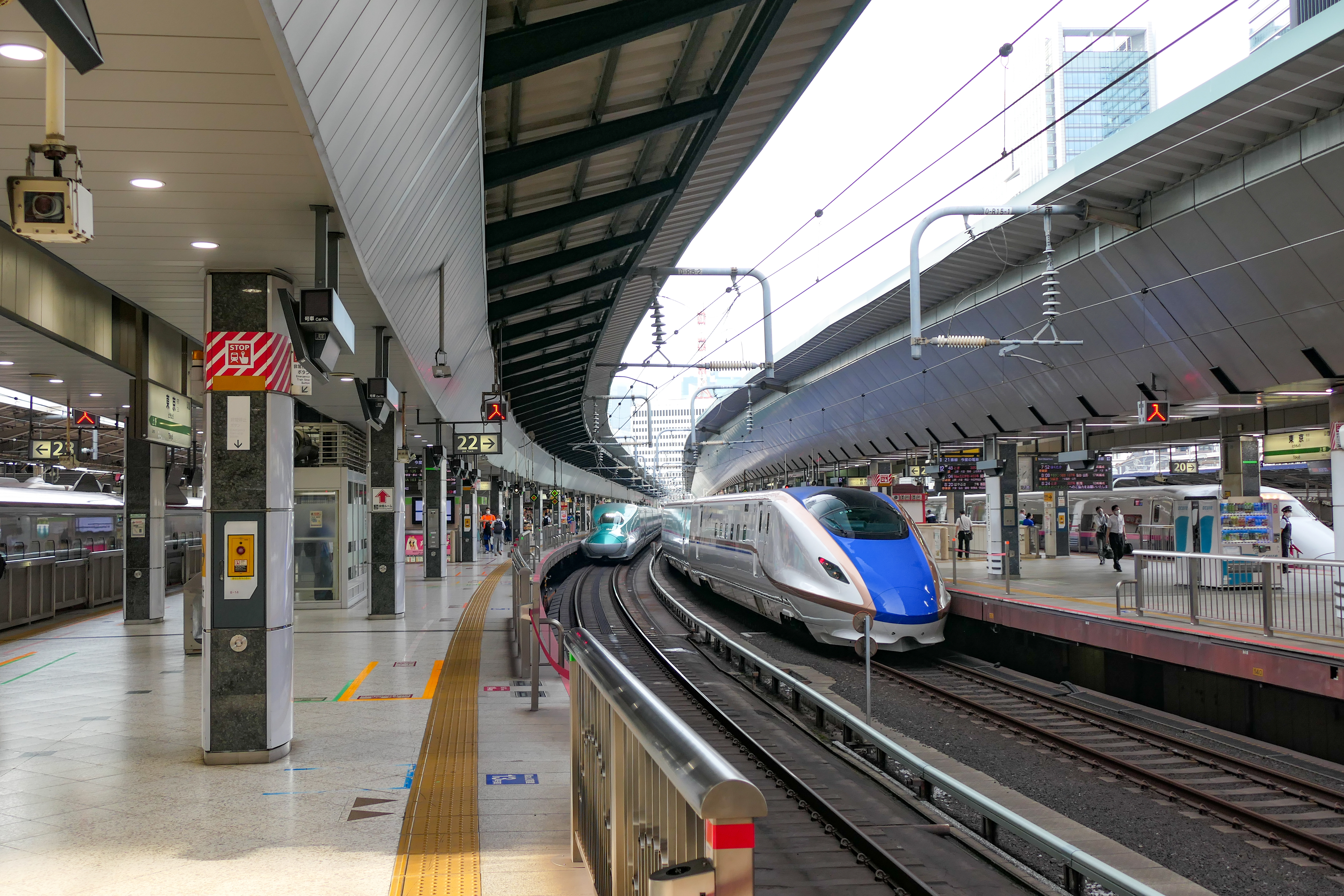
- JR East Shinkansen platform in 2021

General information
- Operator: JR East (Tōhoku Shinkansen and conventional lines); JR Central (Tōkaidō Shinkansen)
- Lines: Tokaido Shinkansen; Tōhoku Shinkansen; Tōkaidō Line; Utsunomiya Line/Takasaki Line; Chūō Line; Sōbu Line/Yokosuka Line; Keiyō Line
- Platforms: 15 island platforms
- Tracks: 28
- Train operators: JR East; JR Central
- Connections: Bus terminal

Construction
- Structure type: Elevated (Shinkansen and some conventional lines); At grade (some conventional lines); Underground (Sōbu and Keiyo lines)
- Accessible: Yes

Other information
- Station code: JT01 (Tōkaidō Line); JC01 (Chūō Line); JO19 (Yokosuka Line/Sōbu Line (Rapid)); JE01 (Keiyo Line); JY01 (Yamanote Line); JU01 (Utsunomiya Line and Takasaki Line); JK26 (Keihin–Tōhoku Line)

History
- Opened: 20 December 1914; 111 years ago

Passengers
- 2024–2025: 869,128 daily; 194,244 daily

Services
Preceding station	JR East	Following station
Terminus	Tōhoku Shinkansen Hayabusa	Ueno towards Shin-Aomori
Terminus	Tōhoku Shinkansen Yamabiko	Ueno towards Morioka
Terminus	Tōhoku Shinkansen Nasuno	Ueno towards Kōriyama
Terminus	Yamagata Shinkansen Tsubasa	Ueno towards Shinjō
Terminus	Akita Shinkansen Komachi	Ueno towards Akita
Terminus	Jōetsu Shinkansen Toki	Ueno towards Niigata
Terminus	Jōetsu Shinkansen Tanigawa	Ueno towards Gala-Yuzawa
Terminus	Hokuriku Shinkansen Kagayaki Asama	Ueno towards Nagano
Terminus	Hokuriku Shinkansen Hakutaka	Ueno towards Jōetsumyōkō
Preceding station	JR Central	Following station
Shinagawa towards Shin-Ōsaka	Tokaido Shinkansen Nozomi Hikari Kodama	Terminus
Other services
Preceding station	JR East	Following station
Yūrakuchō JY30 Next clockwise	Yamanote Line	Kanda Next counter-clockwise
Hamamatsuchō towards Yokohama	Keihin–Tōhoku Line Rapid	Kanda towards Ōmiya
Yūrakuchō JK25 towards Yokohama	Keihin–Tōhoku Line Local	Kanda towards Ōmiya
Terminus	Azusa	Shinjuku towards Hakuba
Terminus	Kaiji (limited service)	Shinjuku towards Ryuo
Terminus	Chūō Line Commuter Special Rapid	Kanda One-way operation
Terminus	Chūō Line Chūō Special Rapid	Kanda towards Ōtsuki
Terminus	Chūō Line Ōme Special Rapid	Kanda towards Tachikawa
Terminus	Chūō Line Commuter Rapid Rapid	Kanda towards Ōtsuki
Yokohama towards Atami	Sunrise Izumo and Sunrise Seto	Terminus
Shinagawa towards Itō	Saphir Odoriko	Terminus
Shinagawa towards Itō or Atami	Odoriko	Terminus
Shimbashi One-way operation	Shōnan	Terminus
Shinagawa towards Odawara	Shōnan	Terminus
Shimbashi towards Atami	Tōkaidō Line	through to Utsunomiya and Takasaki lines
Shimbashi (through-service from Tōkaidō Line) One-way operation	Utsunomiya / Takasaki lines Rapid Rabbit & Urban	Ueno towards Utsunomiya or Takasaki
through to Tōkaidō Line	Utsunomiya / Takasaki lines Local	Ueno towards Kuroiso or Maebashi
Shinagawa Terminus	Hitachi	Ueno towards Sendai
Shinagawa Terminus	Tokiwa	Ueno towards Takahagi
Shimbashi towards Shinagawa	Jōban Line Special Rapid	Ueno towards Tsuchiura
Shimbashi towards Shinagawa	Jōban Line (Rapid) Rapid	Ueno towards Toride
Shimbashi towards Shinagawa	Jōban Line Local-Futsuu	Ueno towards Sendai
Shinagawa (limited service) towards Shinjuku or Ōfuna	Narita Express	Chiba JO28 (rush periods) towards Narita Airport Terminal 1
Terminus	Shiosai	Kinshichō JO22 towards Chōshi
Shimbashi towards Kurihama	Yokosuka Line	through to Sōbu Line
through to Yokosuka Line	Sōbu Line Rapid	Shin-Nihombashi JO20 towards Chiba
Terminus	Sazanami	Soga towards Kimitsu
Terminus	Wakashio	Kaihimmakuhari JE13 (limited service) towards Awa-Kamogawa
Terminus	Keiyō Line Rapid Local	Hatchōbori JE02 towards Soga
Terminus	Musashino Line Keiyō Line through-service	Hatchōbori JE02 towards Fuchūhommachi
Location

Originally, what are now platforms 3–10 were numbered platforms 1–8, with additional platforms added sequentially from west to east through the opening of the Tōkaidō Shinkansen in 1964. Platforms 9–13 were used by the Tōkaidō Main Line and Yokosuka Line but were removed in 1988. From 1991 to 1997, platforms 12 and 13 were used for the Tōhoku Shinkansen. The current Chūō Main Line platforms opened in 1995 as platforms 1 and 2, prompting a renumbering of the remaining platforms and leaving platforms 10 and 11 unused.

The present platform numbering scheme took effect in 1997, when one former Tōkaidō Main Line platform was repurposed for the Jōetsu Shinkansen as platforms 20 and 21, and the existing Tōhoku Shinkansen platforms were renumbered as 22 and 23. As a result, the platforms are now numbered from west to east as platforms 1–10, 20–23, and 14–19.

The upper-level platforms at Tokyo Station are shared by JR East conventional line services, JR East Shinkansen lines, and JR Central Shinkansen lines; however, these operations are fully segregated, with separate tracks and platforms and independent fare gate areas.

=== Main level (2F) platforms ===
(listed in order from west to east)

==== JR East conventional lines ====
1‍–‍2	Chūō Line	for Shinjuku, Tachikawa, Hachiōji, Takao, Ōtsuki; Ōme Line for Haijima, Ōme and Oku-Tama via Tachikawa; Itsukaichi Line for Musashi-Itsukaichi via Tachikawa and Haijima ■ Hachikō Line for Komagawa via Tachikawa and Haijima (morning/night service) ■ Fujikyuko Line for Kawaguchiko via Ōtsuki □ Ltd. Express Azusa (Note: Azusa No. 41 starts service here towards Matsumoto.) for Matsumoto □ Ltd. Express Kaiji (Note: Kaiji No. 35, 39, 43 starts service here towards Kōfu, and Kaiji No. 51 starts service here towards Ryūō.) for Kōfu and Ryūō
3	Keihin–Tōhoku Line	for Ueno, Nippori, Akabane, and Ōmiya
4	Yamanote Line	for Ueno, Nippori, and Ikebukuro
5	Yamanote Line	for Shinagawa and Shibuya
6	Keihin–Tōhoku Line	for Shinagawa, Kawasaki, Yokohama, and Ōfuna
7‍–‍8	Ueno–Tokyo Line	for Ueno, Ōmiya, Utsunomiya, and Kuroiso (via Utsunomiya Line)
7‍–‍8	Ueno–Tokyo Line	for Ueno, Ōmiya, Takasaki, and Maebashi (via Takasaki Line)
7‍–‍8	Ueno–Tokyo Line	for Ueno, Nippori, Toride, and Mito □ Ltd. Express Hitachi/Tokiwa for Iwaki (via Jōban Line)
7‍–‍8	Tōkaidō Line	for Yokohama, Fujisawa, Atami, Numazu; Itō Line for Itō via Atami
9‍–‍10	Tōkaidō Line	for Yokohama, Fujisawa, Atami, Numazu; Itō Line for Itō via Atami □ Ltd. Express Odoriko & Saphir Odoriko for Izukyū Shimoda and Shuzenji □ Sleeper Ltd. Express Sunrise Izumo for Okayama and Izumoshi □ Sleeper Ltd. Express Sunrise Seto for Okayama and Takamatsu

==== JR East Shinkansen ====
20‍–‍23	■ Tōhoku	for Fukushima, Sendai, Morioka, Shin-Aomori and Shin-Hakodate-Hokuto (via Hokkaido Shinkansen)
20‍–‍23	■ Yamagata	for Fukushima, Yamagata, and Shinjo
20‍–‍23	■ Akita	for Sendai, Morioka and Akita
20‍–‍23	■ Jōetsu	for Takasaki and Echigo-Yuzawa and Niigata
20‍–‍23	■ Hokuriku	for Takasaki, Nagano, Toyama, Kanazawa, Fukui and Tsuruga

==== JR Central Shinkansen ====
14‍–‍19	■ Tōkaidō	for Nagoya, Shin-Osaka and Hakata (via San'yō Shinkansen)

=== Lower level platforms ===
==== Keiyo Line (B4F) ====
1	Keiyo Line	for Shin-Kiba, Maihama, Kaihimmakuhari, Soga □ Ltd. Express Sazanami for Kimitsu (via Uchibō Line) □ Ltd. Express Wakashio for Awa-Kamogawa (via Sotobo Line)
1	Musashino Line through service	for Nishi-Funabashi and Fuchūhommachi
2‍–‍4	Keiyo Line	for Shin-Kiba, Maihama, Kaihimmakuhari and Soga
2‍–‍4	Musashino Line through service	for Nishi-Funabashi and Fuchūhommachi

===== Yokosuka/Sōbu Line (B5F) =====
1‍–‍2	Yokosuka Line	for Yokohama, Ōfuna, Kamakura, Zushi and Kurihama □ Narita Express for Ōfuna or Shinjuku (via Shōnan-Shinjuku Line)
2	■ Sōbu Main Line	□ Ltd. Express Shiosai for Narutō and Chōshi
3‍–‍4	Sōbu Line (Rapid)	for Kinshichō, Funabashi and Chiba □ Narita Express for Narita Airport

JR East Tokyo Station

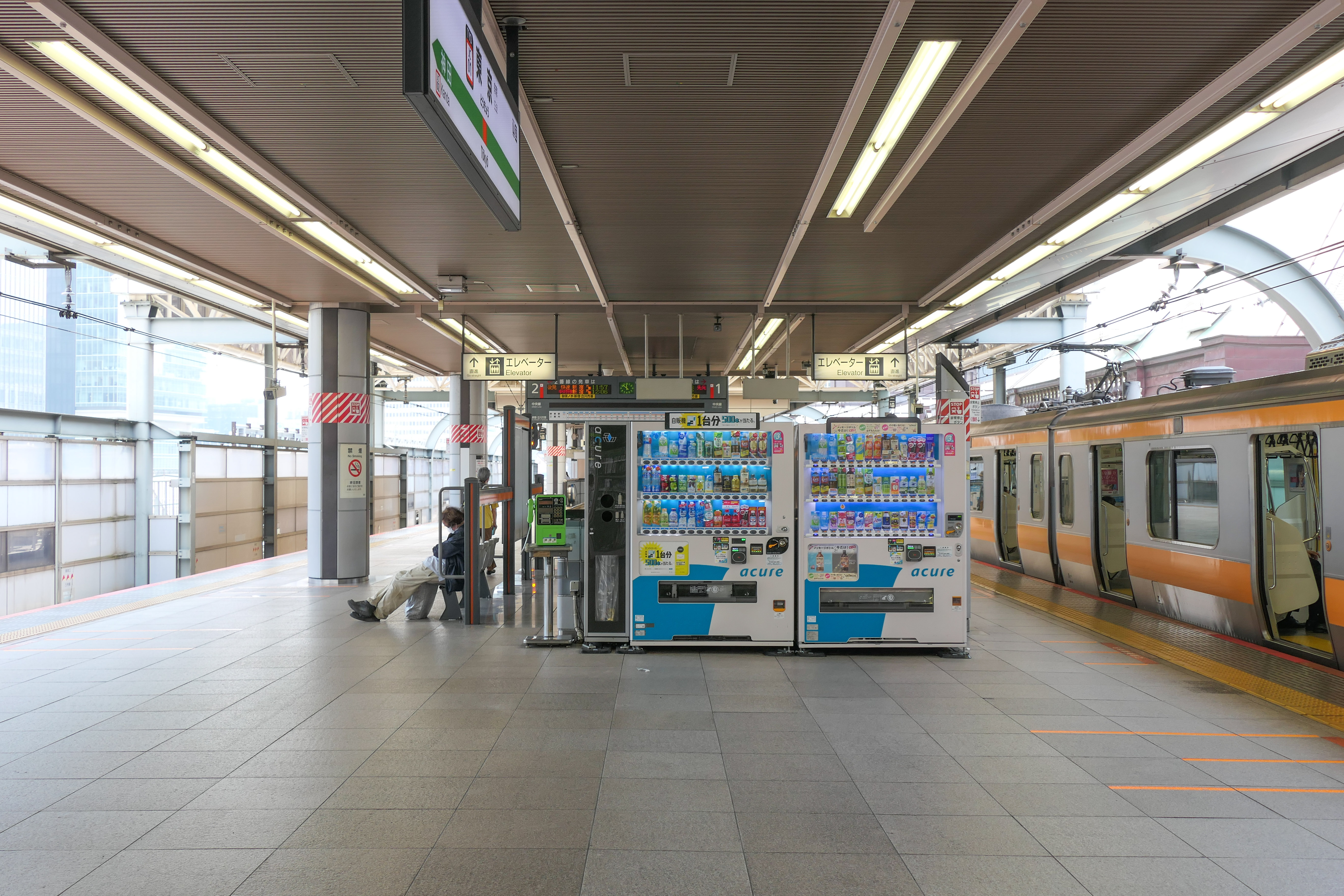
Chūō Main Line platform in 2021

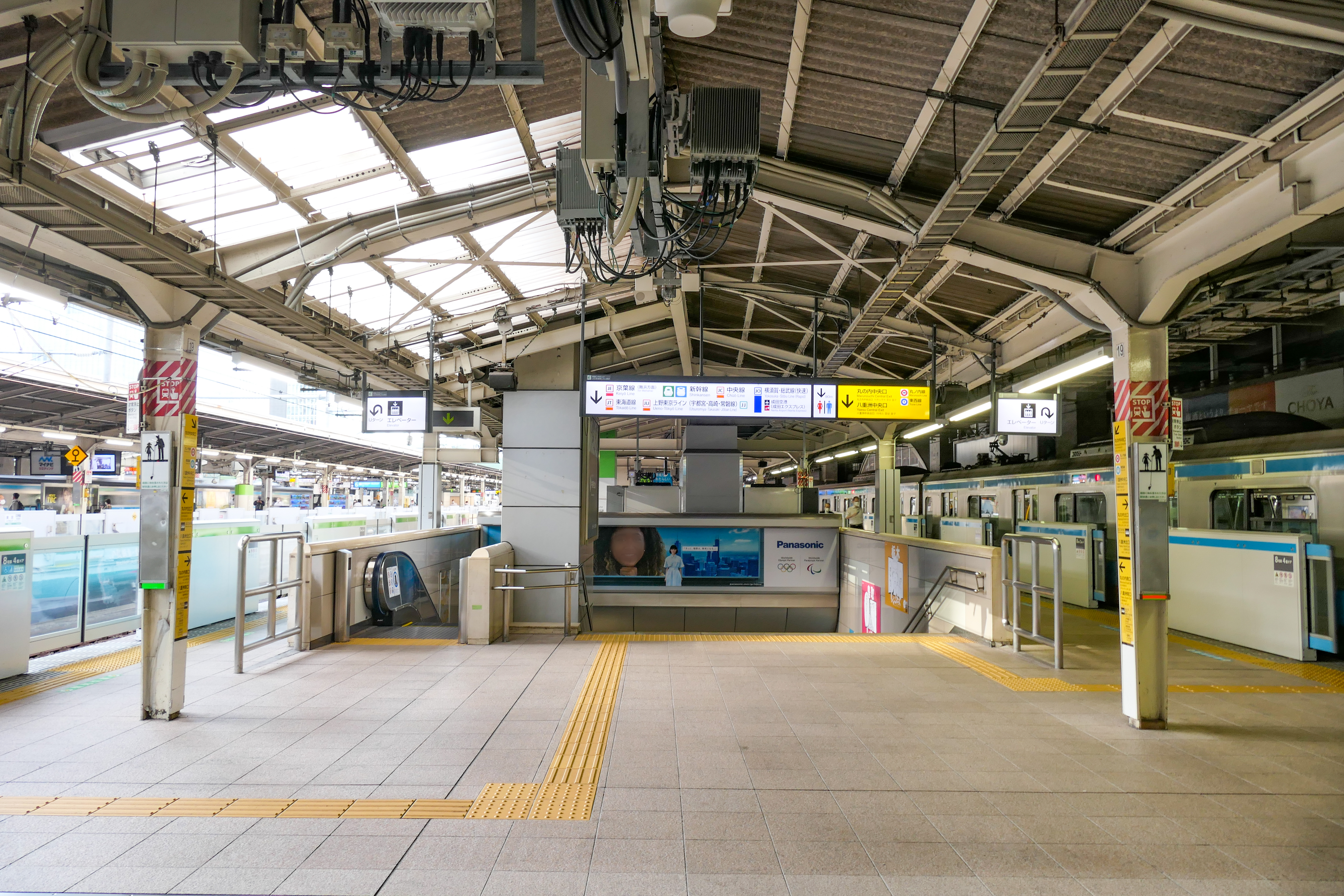
Yamanote and Keihin-Tōhoku Line platform in 2021

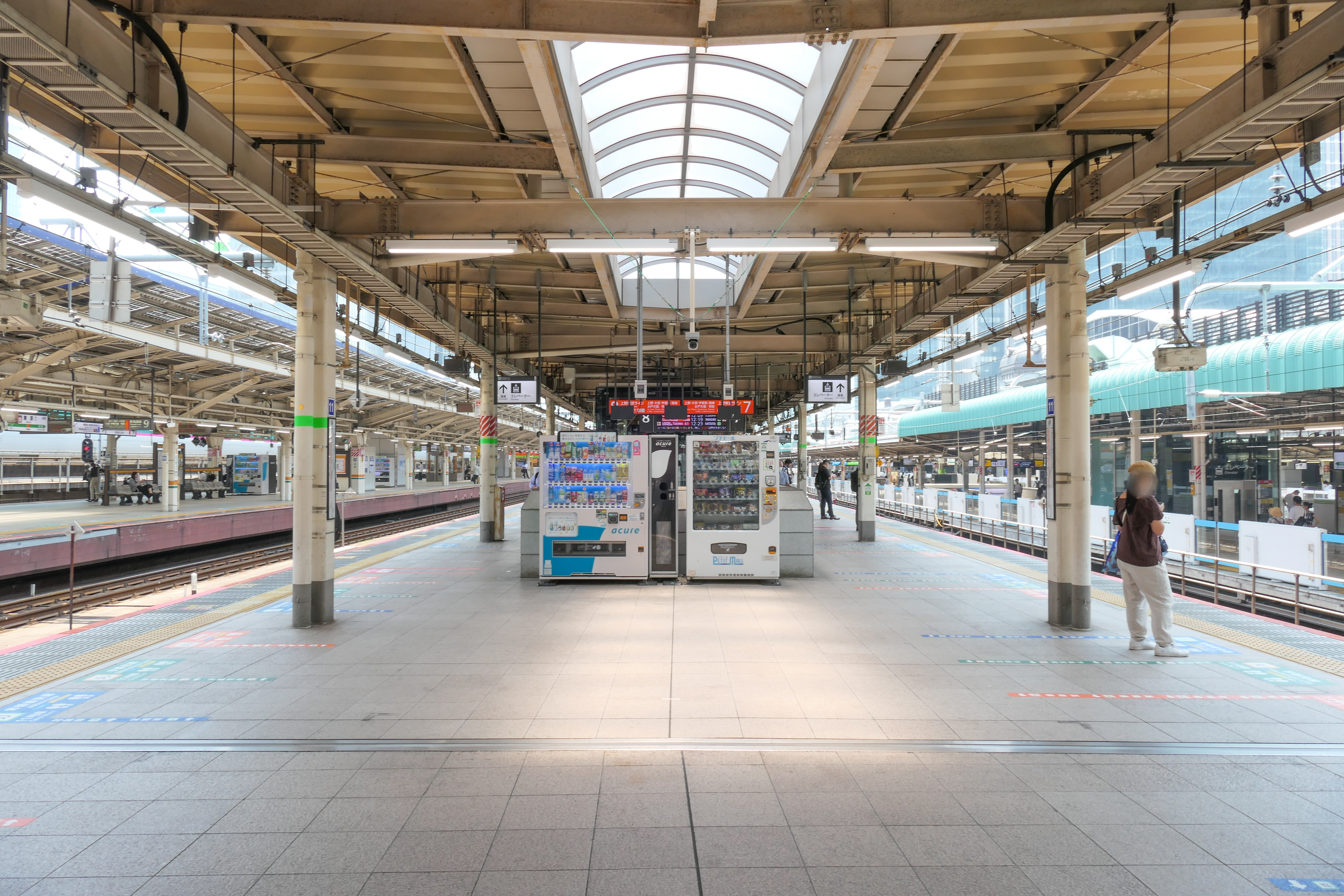
Tōkaidō Main Line platform in 2021

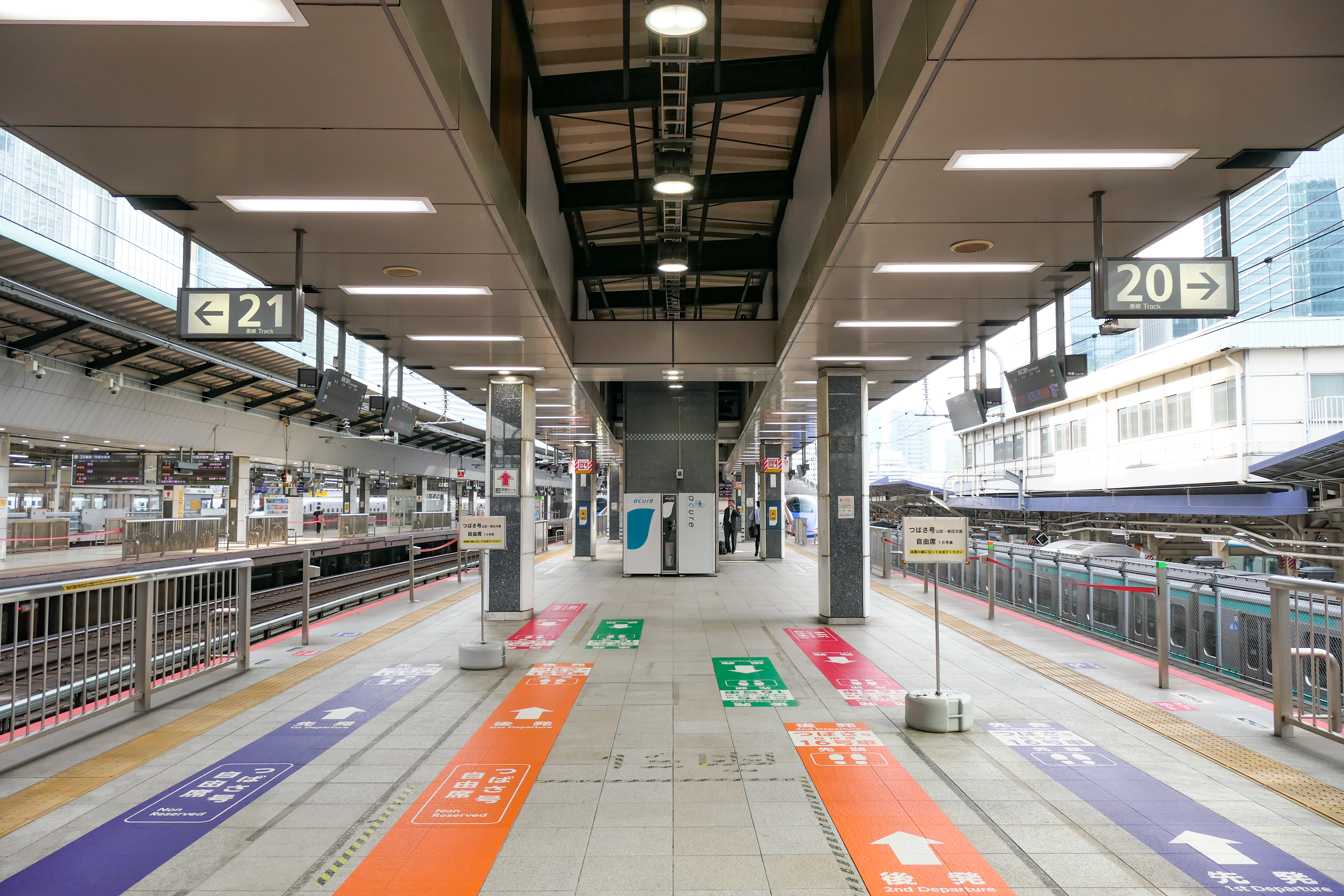
Tōhoku Shinkansen platform in 2021

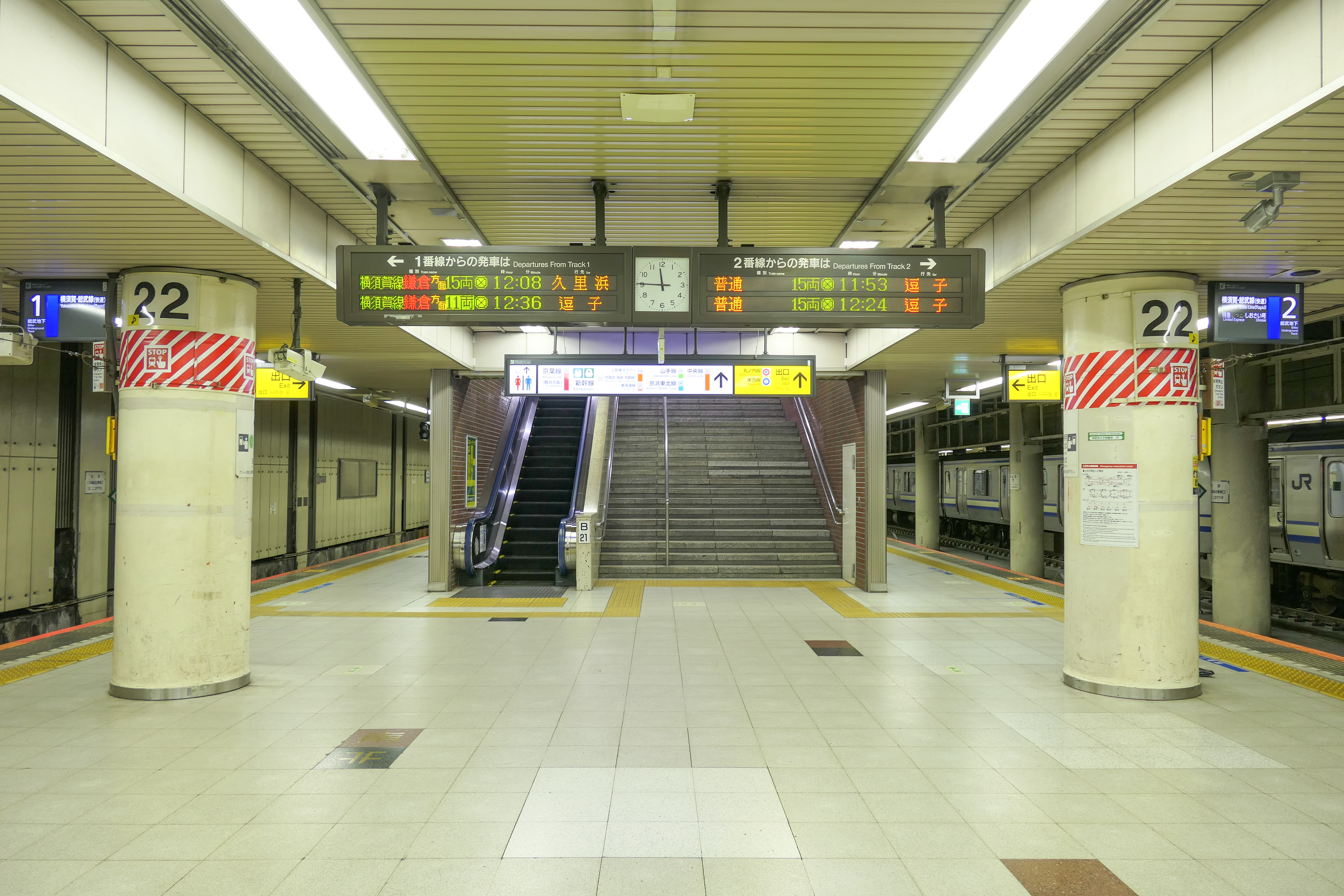
Yokosuka and Sōbu Main Line platform in 2021

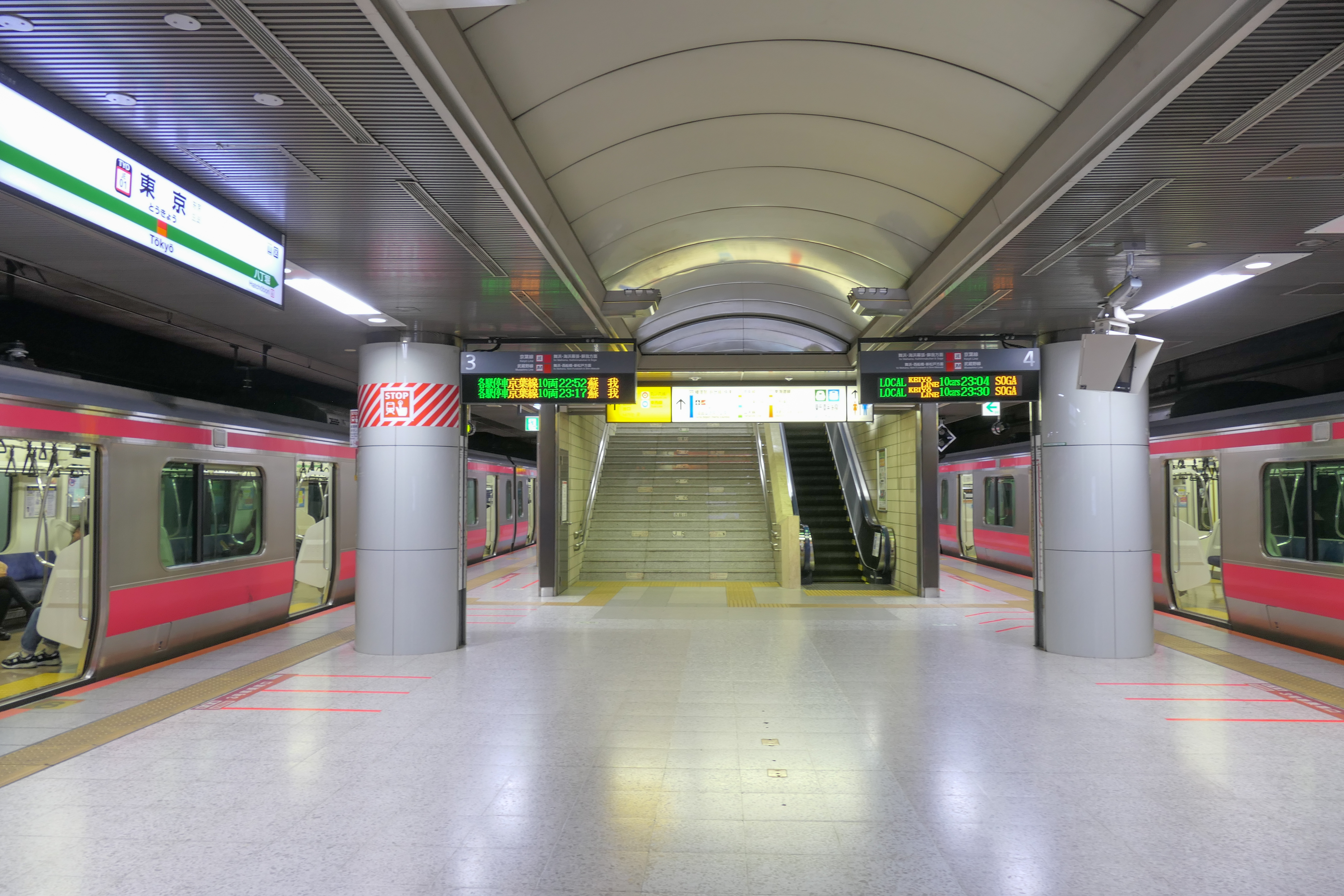
Keiyō Line platform in 2021
JR Central Tokyo Station

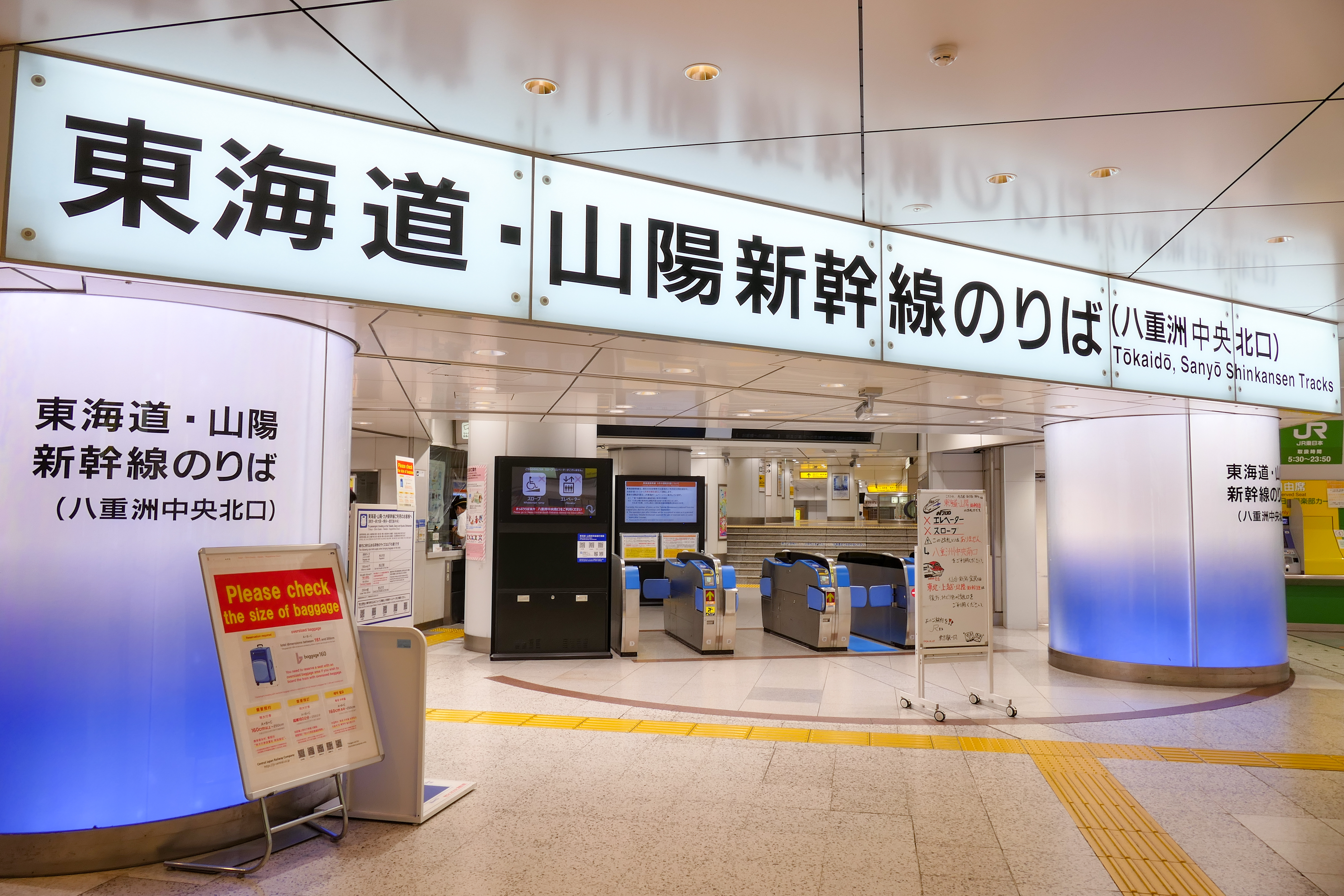
Yaesu North Exit ticket gate in 2021

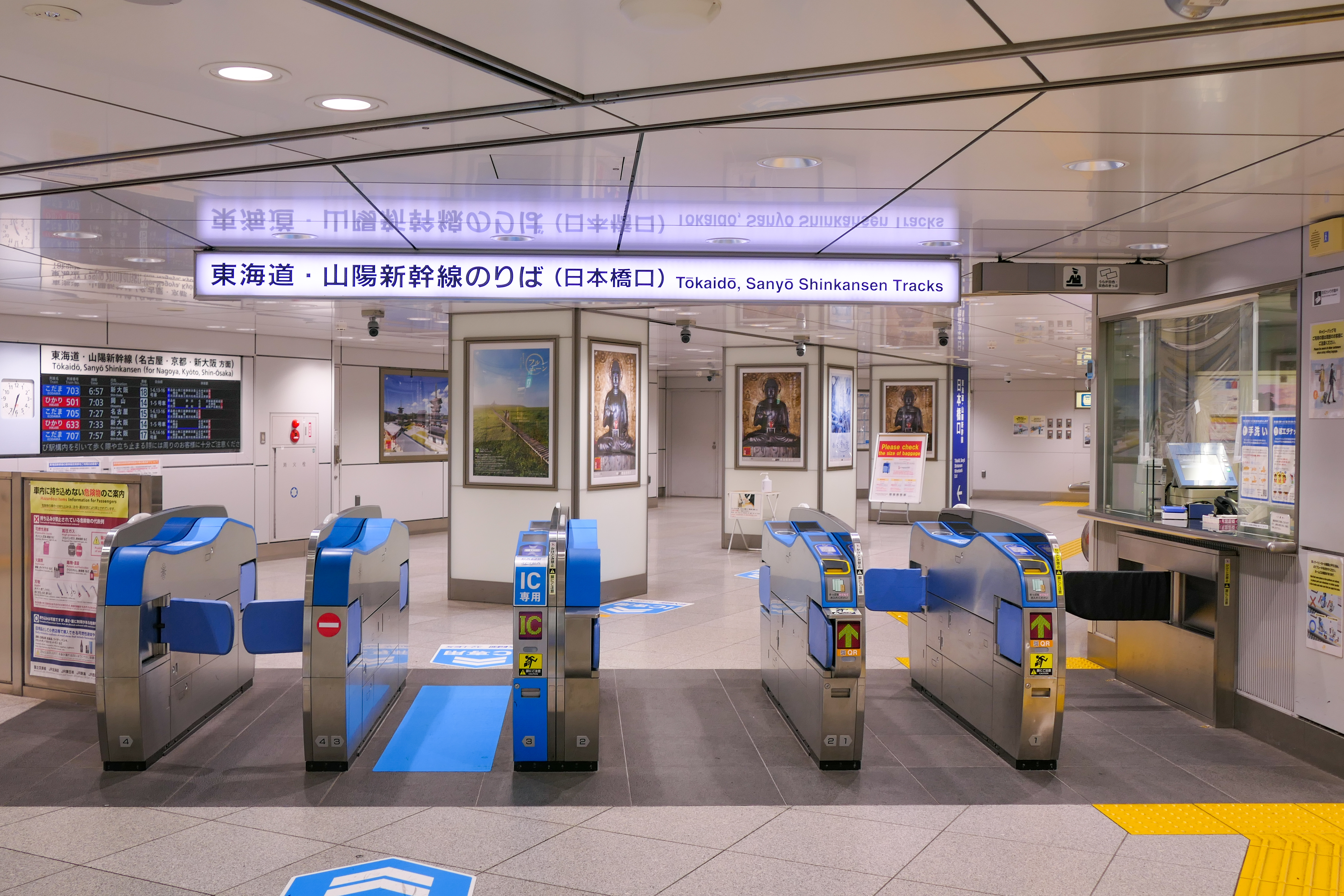
Nihombashi Exit ticket gate in 2021

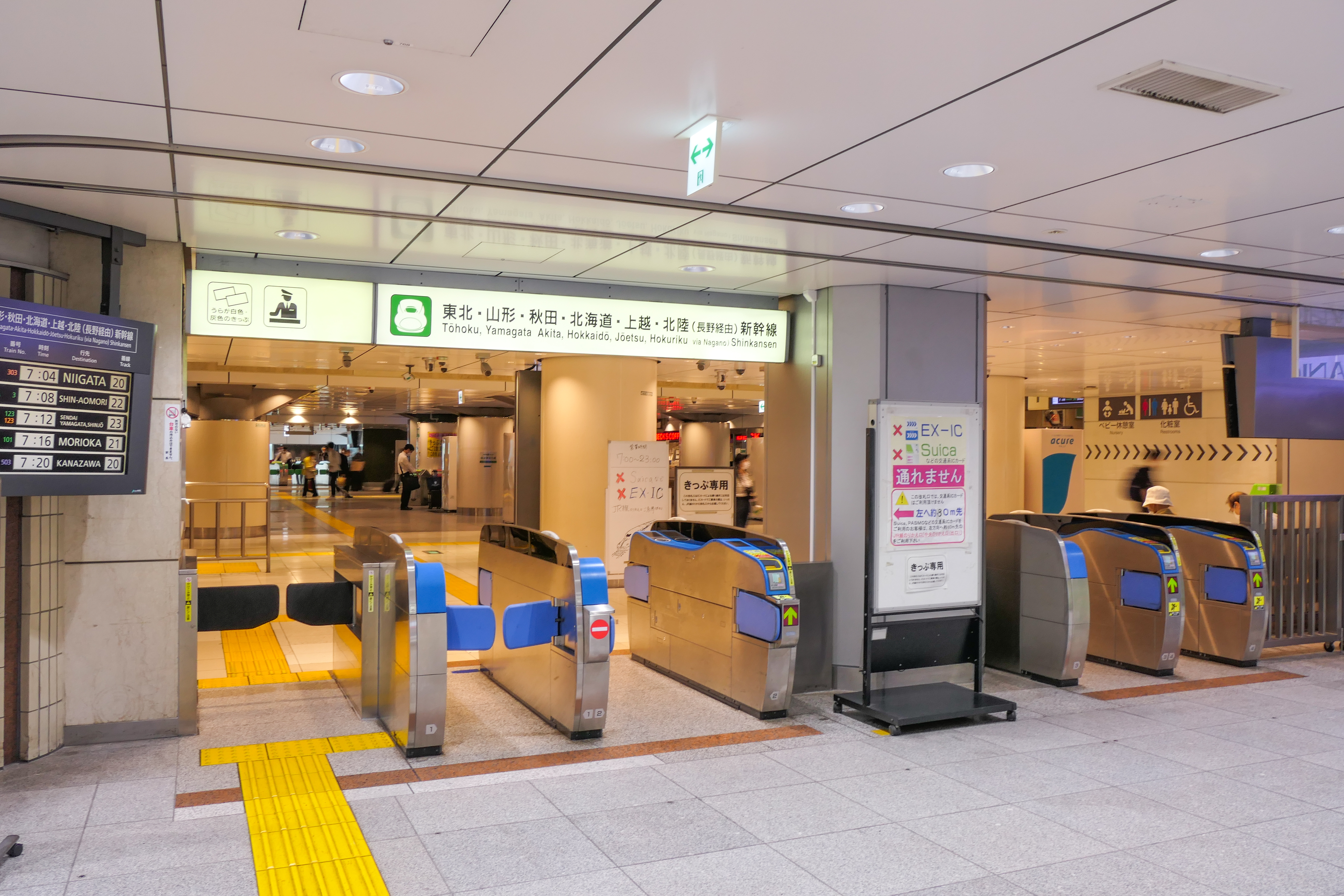
JR East Shinkansen transfer ticket gate in 2021

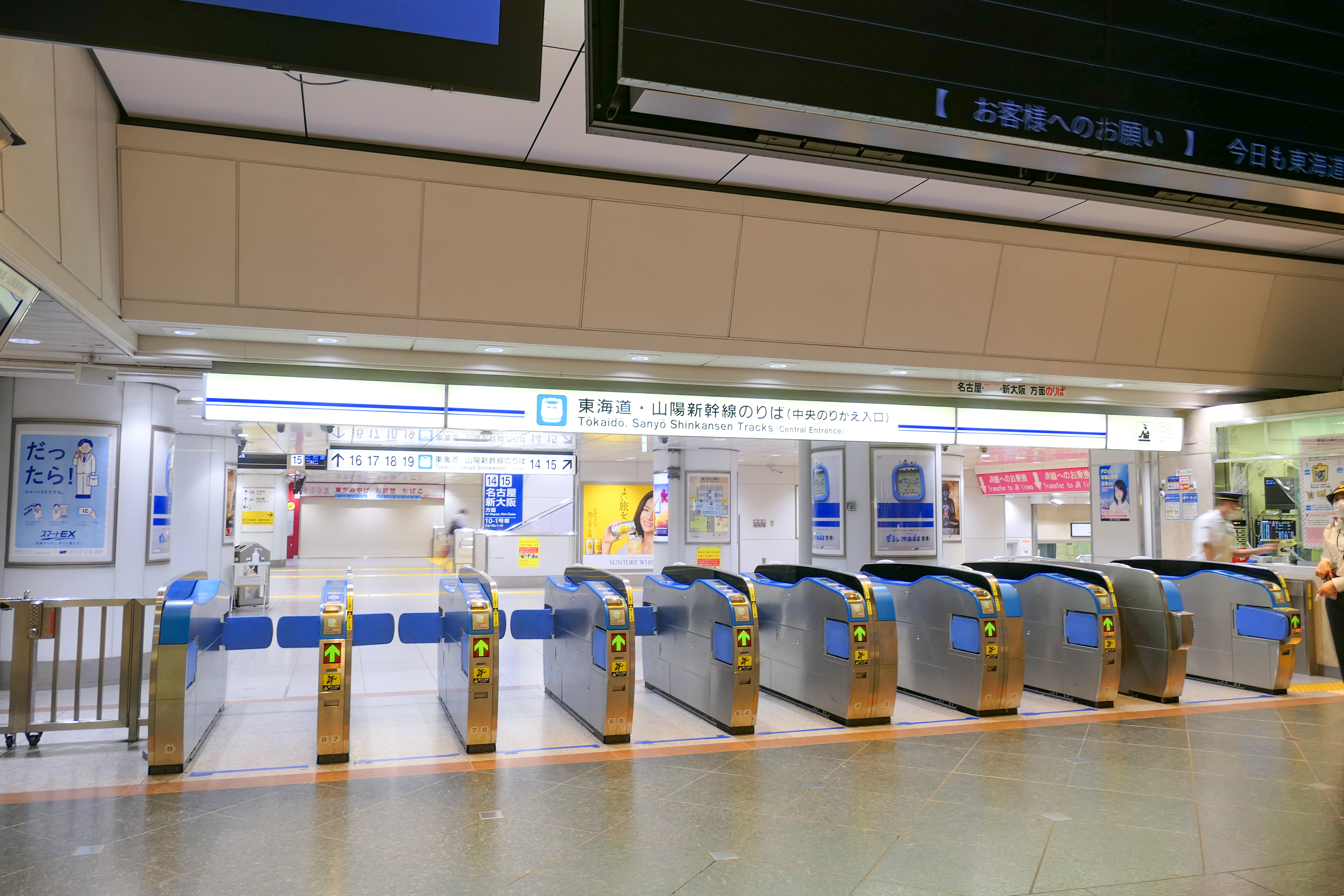
JR East Conventional line transfer ticket gate in 2021

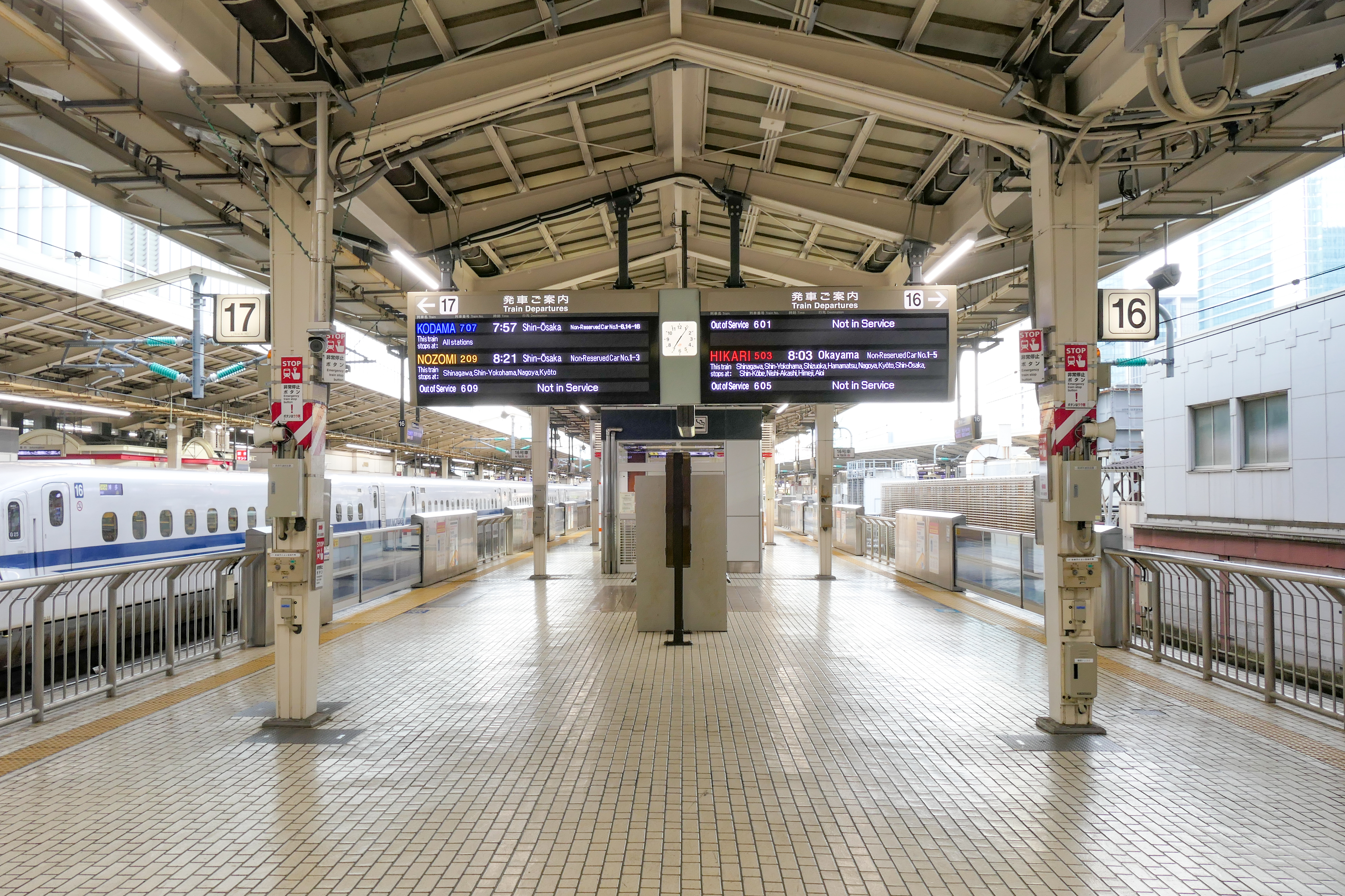
Tōkaidō Shinkansen platform in 2021

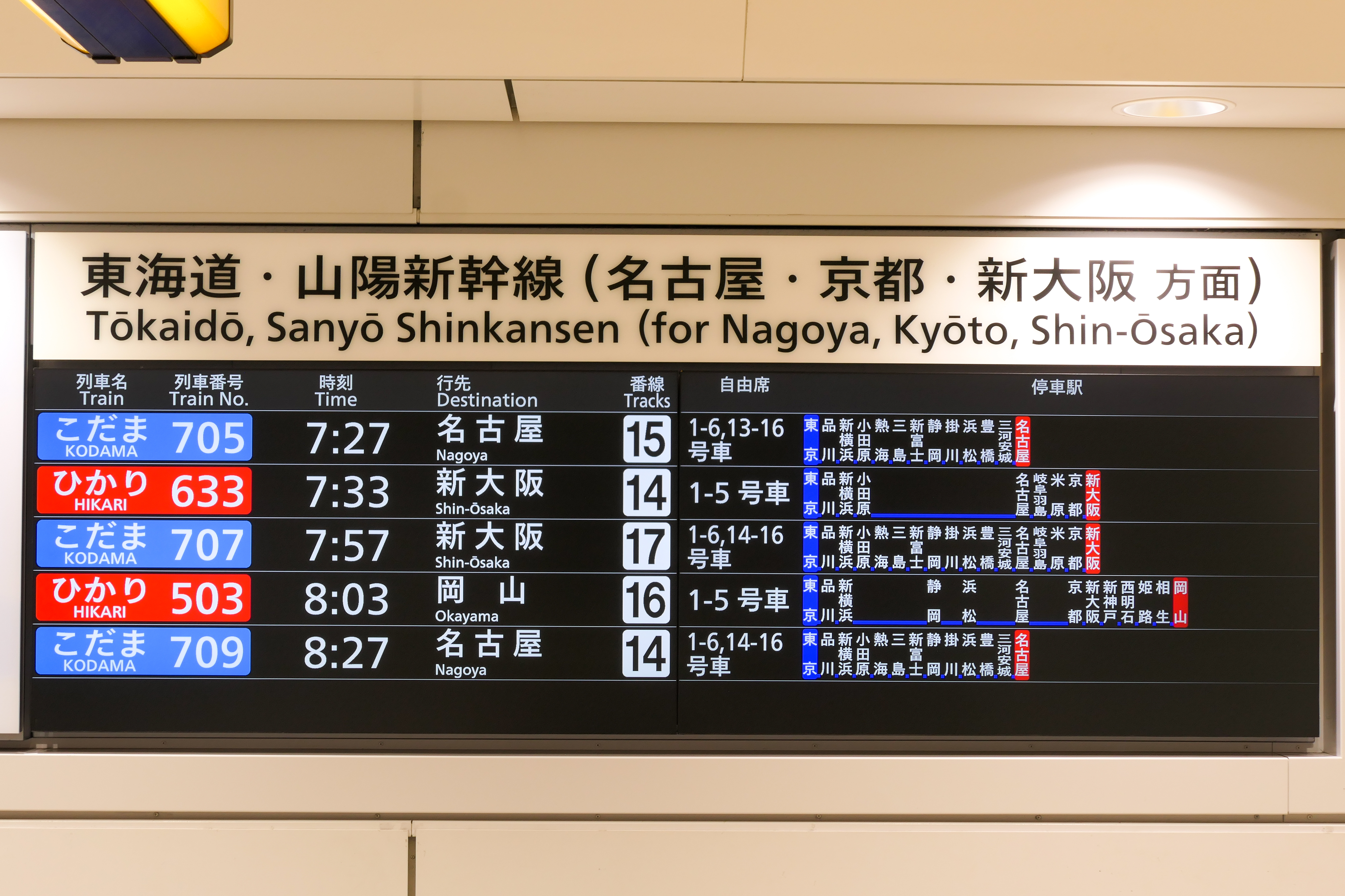
Departure information board in 2021

== Tokyo Metro ==
Tokyo Station 東京駅

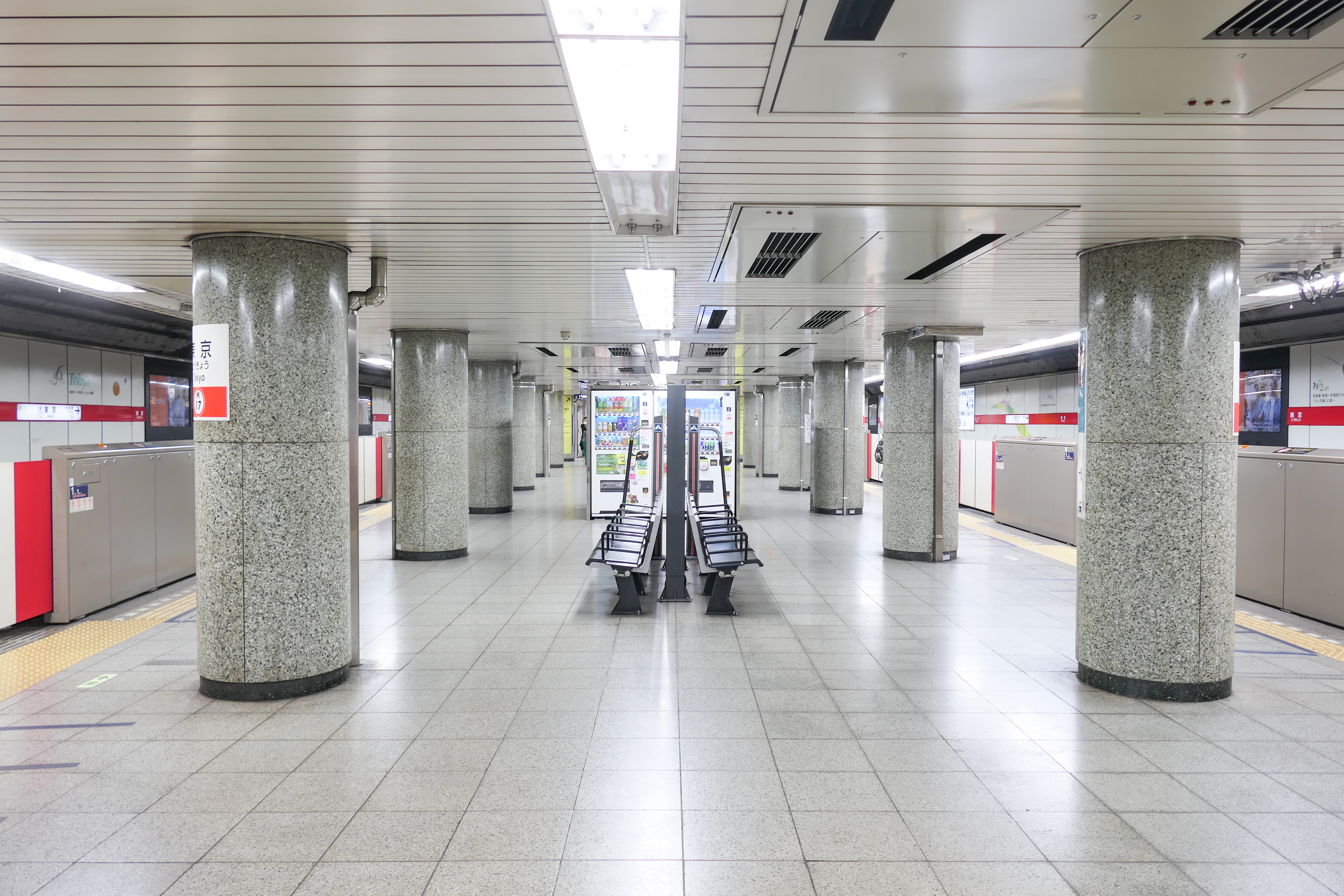
- Marunouchi Line platform in 2022

General information
- System: Tokyo subway
- Owner: Tokyo Metro Co., Ltd.
- Operator: Tokyo Metro
- Line: Marunouchi Line
- Platforms: 1 island platform
- Tracks: 2
- Connections: Bus terminal

Construction
- Structure type: Underground
- Accessible: Yes

Other information
- Station code: M-17

History
- Opened: 20 March 1956; 70 years ago

Passengers
- 2024: 199,232 daily

Services
Preceding station	Tokyo Metro	Following station
Ginza towards Ogikubo or Hōnanchō	Marunouchi Line	Ōtemachi towards Ikebukuro
Location

1	Marunouchi Line	for Ginza, Shinjuku and Ogikubo
2	Marunouchi Line	for Otemachi and Ikebukuro

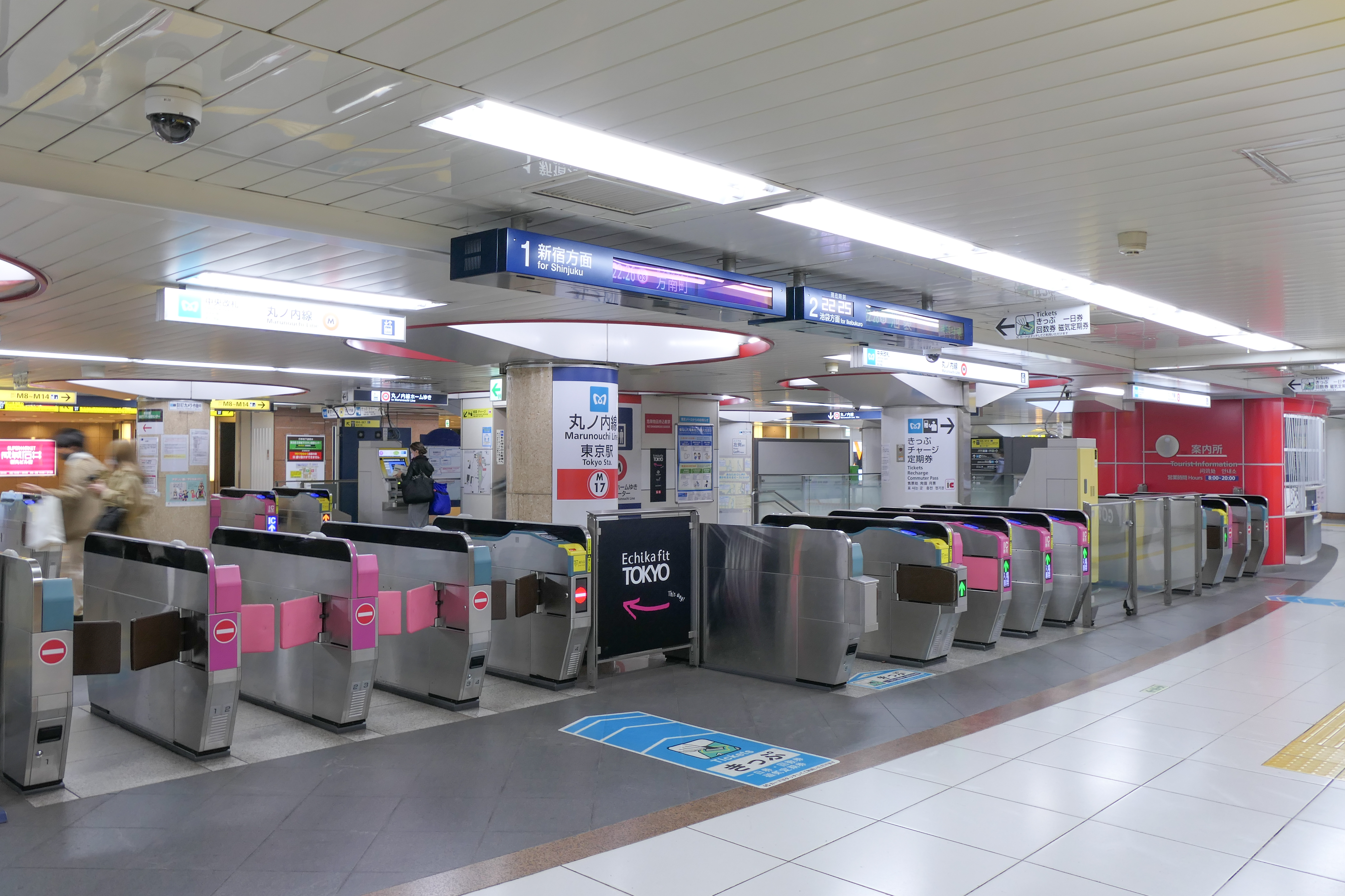
Marunouchi Line ticket gate in 2022

== Proposed developments ==
There was a proposal to build a spur to Tokyo Station from the nearby Toei Asakusa Line, which would provide another connection to the subway network, and also possibly provide faster connections from the station to Tokyo's airports, Haneda and Narita. The plan has yet to be formally adopted as authorities were re-considering a similar plan as part of the infrastructure improvements for the 2020 Summer Olympics; the proposed line would cut travel time to Haneda from 30 minutes to 18 minutes, and to Narita from 55 minutes to 36 minutes, at a total cost of around 400 billion yen.

The Haneda Airport Access Line, which is scheduled to open in 2031, will enable trains running on the Tokaido Line via Tokyo Station to also run to Haneda Airport.

There are also plans to extend the Tsukuba Express from Akihabara to Tokyo. In September 2013, a number of municipalities along the Tsukuba Express line in Ibaraki Prefecture submitted a proposal to complete the extension at the same time as the new airport-to-airport line.

Tokyo Metro is also planning Tokyo as the terminus for their future line that could connect Odaiba.

== Passenger statistics ==
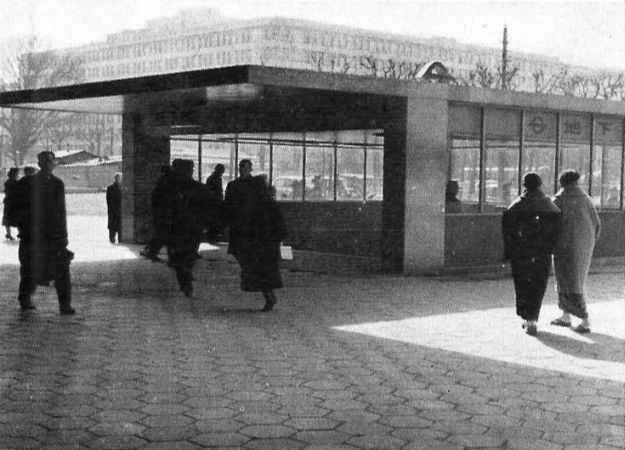
Teito Rapid Transit Authority Tokyo Station in 1956.

In fiscal 2018, the JR East station was used by an average of 467,165 passengers daily (boarding passengers only), making it the third busiest station on the JR East network. Over the same fiscal year, the Tokyo Metro station was used by an average of 218,275 passengers daily (both exiting and entering passengers), making it the ninth-busiest Tokyo Metro station. The passenger figures (boarding passengers only) for the JR East (formerly JNR) station in previous years are as shown below.

Fiscal year	Annual total
1914	553,105
1919	4,879,042
1924	15,953,910
1929	24,926,502
1934	24,119,757

Fiscal year	Daily average
1960	331,275
1971	352,109
1984	338,203
2000	372,611
2005	379,350
2010	381,704
2011	380,997
2012	402,277
2013	415,908
2014	417,822
2015	434,633
2016	439,554
2017	452,549
2018	467,165
2019	462,589
2020	271,108
2021	282,638
2022	346,658
2023	403,831
2024	434,564

== Surrounding area ==
=== Districts ===
- Marunouchi
- Yaesu
- Ginza

=== Buildings ===
- Tokyo Midtown Yaesu Yaesu Central Tower
- Tofrom Yaesu Tower (completed 28 February 2026; full opening expected in Fall 2026)
- Marunouchi Building
- Shin-Marunouchi Building
- JP Tower
- Tokyo International Forum
- Tokyo Imperial Palace
- Mitsubishi Ichigokan Museum, Tokyo

=== Hotels ===
- Shangri-La Hotel, Tokyo

=== Stations ===
Other stations within walking distance of Tokyo station include the following.

- Ōtemachi Station (Tokyo Metro Marunouchi Line, Tokyo Metro Chiyoda Line, Tokyo Metro Tōzai Line, Tokyo Metro Hanzōmon Line, Toei Mita Line)
- Hatchōbori Station (Keiyō Line, Tokyo Metro Hibiya Line)
- Nihombashi Station (Tokyo Metro Ginza Line, Tokyo Metro Tōzai Line, Toei Asakusa Line)
- Mitsukoshimae Station (Tokyo Metro Hanzōmon Line, Tokyo Metro Ginza Line)
- Shin-Nihombashi Station (Sōbu Line Rapid)
- Nijūbashimae Station ( Tokyo Metro Chiyoda Line)
- Hibiya Station (Tokyo Metro Hibiya Line, Tokyo Metro Chiyoda Line, Toei Mita Line)
- Yūrakuchō Station (Yamanote Line, Keihin-Tōhoku Line, Tokyo Metro Yūrakuchō Line)
- Ginza-itchōme Station (Tokyo Metro Yūrakuchō Line)
- Kyōbashi Station (Tokyo Metro Ginza Line)
- Takarachō Station (Toei Asakusa Line)

== Bus terminal ==
- Yaesu South Exit Highway Bus Terminal

Nickname	Destination	Major stops	Operation
La Foret	Aomori Station	Direct	JR Bus Tōhoku
Tsugaru	Aomori Station	Aomori Kenko Land	Kōnan Bus Company
Sirius	Shichinohe-Towada Station	Hachinohe Station, Towadashi Station	Kokusai Kogyo Towada Kankō Electric Railway
Dream Akita/Yokohama	Akita University	Akita Station	JR Bus Tohoku
Dream Chokai	Ugo-Honjō Station	Kisakata Station, Konoura Station, Nikaho Station	JR Bus Tohoku Ugo Kotsu
Dream Morioka"Rakuchin"	Morioka Bus Center	Morioka Station	JR Bus Tohoku Kokusai Kogyo Iwateken Kotsu
Dream Sasanishiki	Furukawa Station	Sendai Station, Izumi-Chūō Station, Taiwa	JR Bus Tohoku
Dream Fukushima/Yokohama	Fukushima Station	Kōriyama Station	JR Bus Tohoku
Yume Kaidou Aizu	Aizu-Wakamatsu Station	Inawashiro Station	JR Bus Kanto
Iwaki	Iwaki Station	Kitaibaraki, Nakoso, Yumoto, Iwaki Chuo	JR Busu Kanto Tobu Bus Central Shin Joban Kotsu
Tokyo Yumeguri	Kusatsu Onsen	Direct	JR Bus Kanto
Marronnier Tokyo	Sano Shintoshi Bus Terminal	Sano Premium Outret	JR Bus Kanto
Hitachi	Takahagi Station	Hitachi-Taga Station, Hitachi Station	JR Bus Kanto Hitachi Dentetsu
Hitachi-Ota Line	Hitachi-Ōta	Naka IC, Naka City Office, Nukata-Minamigou	JR BUs Kanto Ibaraki Kotsu
Hitachi-Daigo Line	Hitachi-Daigo	Naka IC, Hitachiōmiya, Fukuroda Falls	Ibaraki Kotsu
Katsuta/Tokai	Japan Atomic Energy Agency	Hitachinaka, Katsuta Station, Tōkai Station	Ibaraki Kotsu
Mito	Mito Station	Ishioka, Akatsuka Station, Ibaraki University	JR Bus Kanto Ibaraki Kotsu Kantō Railway
Ibaraki Airport Line	Ibaraki Airport	Direct	Kanto Railway
Tsukuba	University of Tsukuba	Namiki 2, Namiki 1, Tsukuba Center	JR Bus Kanto Kanto Railway
Joso Route	Iwai	Shin-Moriya Station, Mitsukaidō Station	Kanto Railway Kantetsu Purple Bus
Kashima	Kashima Shrine	Suigo-Itako, Kashimajingū Station, Kashima Soccer Stadium	JR Bus Kanto Keisei Bus Kanto Railway
Hasaki	Hasaki	Suigo-Itako, Kamisu	JR Bus Kanto Kanto Railway
The Access Narita	Narita International Airport	Direct	JR Bus Kanto Heiwa Kotsu Aska Kotsu
Yokaichiba Route	Sōsa City Office	Tomisato, Tako, Yōkaichiba Station	JR Bus Kanto Chiba Kotsu
Boso Nanohana	Tateyama Station	Kazusa-Minato, Chikura, Awa-Shirahama	JR Bus Kanto Nitto Kotsu
Yoshikawa Matsubushi Line	Matsubushi	Misato, Yoshikawa Station	JR Bus Kanto
Skytree Shuttle	Tokyo Skytree	Edo-Tokyo Museum, Tobu Hotel Levant Tokyo	JR Bus Kanto Tobu Bus Central
Midnight Arrow Kasukabe	Kasukabe Station	Sōka, Shin-Koshigaya, Koshigaya, Sengendai	Tobu Bus Central
Midnight Express	Kabe Station	Haijima, Kumagawa, Fussa, Hamura, Ozaku	Nishi Tokyo Bus
Midnight Express	Takao Station	Nishi-Hachiōji Station	Nishi Tokyo Bus
Midnight Arrow	Ōfuna Station	Yokohama Station, Higashi-Totsuka Station	Kanagawa Chuo kotsu
Midnight Arrow	Hiratsuka Station	Totsuka Station, Kōnandai Station, Fujisawa Station	Kanagawa Chuo kotsu
Midnight Arrow	Hon-Atsugi Station	Machida Station, Sagami-Ōno Station, Ebina Station	Kanagawa Chuo kotsu
Tokyo Hakone Line	Hakone-Tōgendai	Gotemba Station, Sengokuhara	JR Bus Kanto Odakyu Hakone Kosoku Bus
Tokyo Kawaguchiko Line	Kawaguchiko Station	Gotemba Station, Lake Yamanaka, Fuji-Q Highland	JR Bus Kanto Fujikyu Yamanashi Bus
Willer Express	Nagano Station	Nagano, Nagano-Ojimada	Willer Express Hokushinetsu
Hakuba Snow Magic	Hakuba Cortina	Hakuba Goryu, Hakuba Happo	Alpico Kōtsū
Sansan Numazu Tokyo	Numazu Garrage	Numazu Station	Fujikyu City Bus
Kaguyahime Express	Takaoka Garrage	Shin-Fuji Station, Fuji Station	Fujikyu Shizuoka Bus
Yakisoba Express	Fujinomiya Garrage	Fujinomiya City Office, Fujinomiya Station	Fujikyu Shizuoka Bus
Shimizu Liner	Miho no Matsubara	Shimizu Station, Shin-Shimizu Station	JR Bus Kanto Shizutetsu Justline
Tomei Highway Bus	Nagoya Station	Shizuoka Station, Hamamatsu Station	JR Bus Kanto JR Bus Tech JR Tokai Bus
Dream Shizuoka/Hamamatsu	Hamamatsu Station	Shizuoka Station, Kakegawa Station	JR Tokai Bus
Chita Seagull	Chita Handa Station	Chiryū Station, Kariya Station	JR Bus Kanto
Dream Nagoya	Nagoya Station	Nisshin Station, Chikusa, Sakae Station, Gifu Station	JR Bus Kanto JR Tokai Bus
Dream Kanazawa	Kanazawa Institute of Technology	Toyama Station, Kanazawa Station	JR Bus Kanto West JR Bus
Dream Fukui	Fukui Station	Tsuruga, Takefu, Sabae	JR Bus Kanto Keifuku Bus Fukui Railway
Dream / Hirutokkyu	Ōsaka Station	Kyōto Station, Sannomiya Station, Nara Station	JR Bus Kanto West JR Bus
Dream Nanba/Sakai	Sakaishi Station	Kyōtanabe, Osaka City Air Terminal, Namba Station	Nankai Bus
Dream Tokushima	Anan Station	Naruto, Matsushige, Tokushima Station, Komatsushima	JR Bus Kanto JR Shikoku Bus
Dream Takamatsu	Kannonji Station	Takamatsu Station, Sakaide	JR Bus Kanto JR Shikoku Bus
Dream Kochi	Harimayabashi Station	Kōchi Station	JR Bus Kanto JR Shikoku Bus
Dream Matsuyama	Matsuyama Station	Mishima-Kawanoe, Kawauchi, Matsuyama IC, Okaido	JR Bus Kanto JR Shikoku Bus
Keihin Kibi Dream	Kurashiki Station	Sanyo IC, Okayama Station	Chugoku JR Bus
New Breeze	Hiroshima Bus Center	Hiroshima Station, Kure Station	Chugoku JR Bus Odakyu City Bus
Dream Okayama/Hiroshima	Hiroshima Bus Center	Okayama Station, Hiroshima Station	Chugoku JR Bus
Tokubetsu Bin	Ube-Shinkawa Station	Hiroshima, Shin-Yamaguchi	Chugoku JR Bus
Susanoo	Izumo-taisha	Tamatsukuri, Shinji, Hishikawa IC, Izumoshi Station	Ichibata Bus Chugoku JR Bus
Hagi Express	Hagi Bus Center	Iwakuni Station, Tokuyama Station, Hōfu	Bocho Kotsu

== Sister stations ==
Tokyo Station has "sister station" agreements with Amsterdam Centraal station in the Netherlands, Grand Central Terminal in New York, USA, Beijing railway station in China, Hsinchu Station in Taiwan, and Frankfurt (Main) Hauptbahnhof in Germany.

== See also ==
- List of East Japan Railway Company stations
- List of railway stations in Japan
- Transport in Greater Tokyo
- List of development projects in Tokyo
- Ramen Street – an area in Tokyo Station's underground mall specializing in ramen dishes
