= Tokyo Station Hotel =

- 東京ステーションホテル
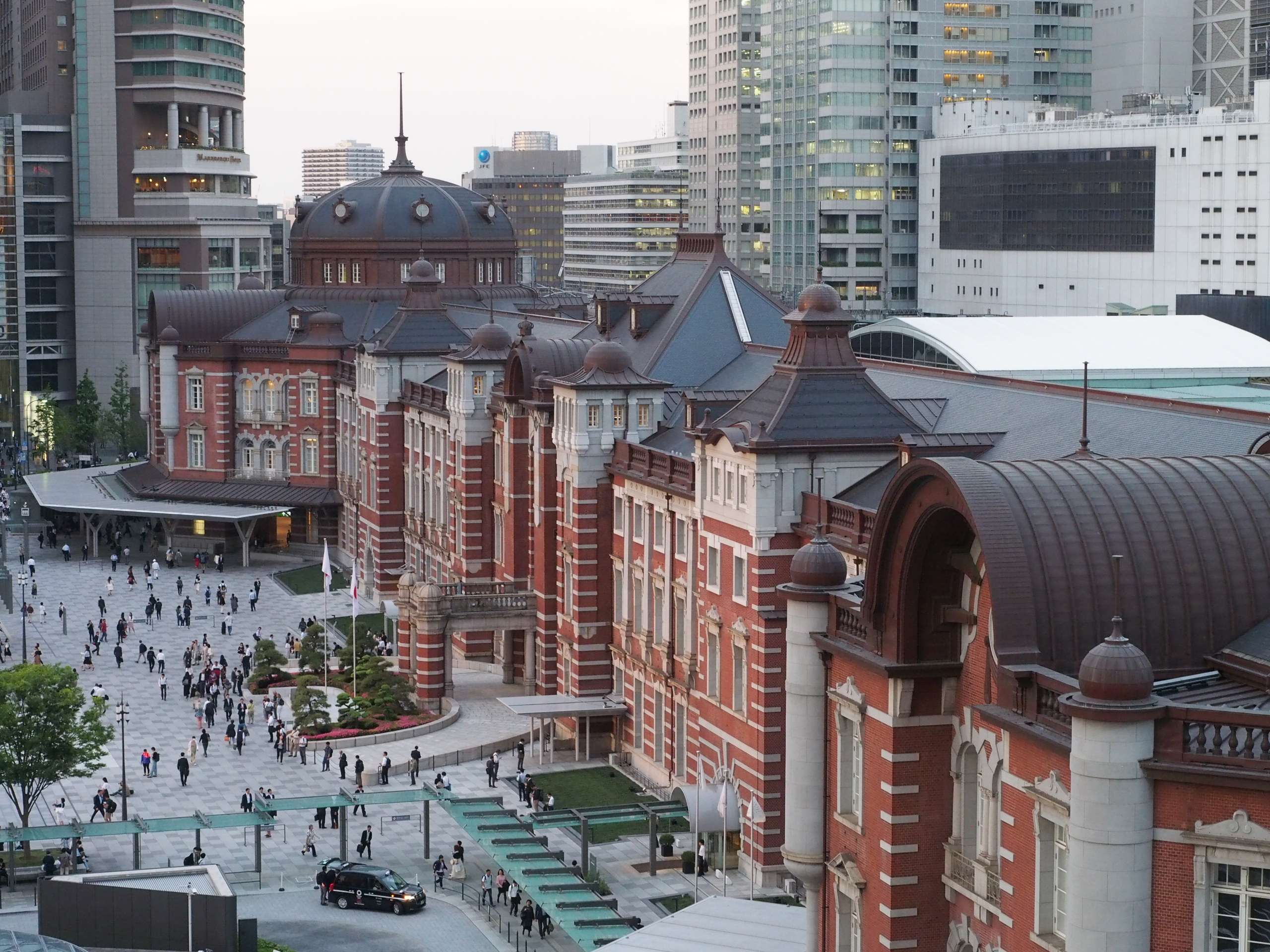
- The main building of Tokyo Station, which houses the hotel

General information
- Opened: 2 November 1915
- Renovated: 3 October 2012
- Owner: Nippon Hotel (wholly owned subsidiary of JR East)

Design and construction
- Architect: Kingo Tatsuno

Other information
- Number of rooms: 150
- Number of restaurants: 10

Website
- Official website

The Tokyo Station Hotel is a boutique hotel located in Marunouchi, Tokyo. The hotel is part of the main building at Tokyo Station, one of the main rail termini in Tokyo and the final stop for the Shinkansen lines that go westwards and northwards.

The hotel opened on 2 November 1915, a year after the opening of the station. Initially commissioned to the Seiyoken restaurant chain, the hotel was taken over by the Ministry of Railways in 1933. The hotel suffered major damage during the air raid of 25 May 1945, and the hotel reopened in 1950, after the building was repaired.

The hotel closed again in 2006 as a major restoration and renovation were planned for the building. The building was restored to the original 1914 form, which included the restoration of the top floor rooms which had been removed following the Second World War. The hotel reopened on 3 October 2012 with 150 guest rooms and 10 restaurants and cafes. Forbes Travel Guide has rated the hotel Four-Star. The hotel is a member of the Small Luxury Hotels of the World.
