= Postwar Japan =

Period of Japanese history from 1945 to 1989

Postwar Japan is the period in Japanese history beginning with the surrender of Japan to the Allies of World War II on 2 September 1945, and lasting at least until the end of the Shōwa era in 1989.

Despite the massive devastation it suffered in the Second World War, Japan established itself as a global economic power at peace with the world after the Allied-occupation ended on 28 April 1952 by the Treaty of San Francisco. In terms of political power it was more reluctant, especially in the nonuse of military force. The post-war constitution of 1947 included Article 9, which restricted Japan from having a military force and engaging in war. However, it has operated military forces in the stationing of the United States Forces Japan based on the U.S.-Japan Security Treaty after the Allied occupation and the form of the Japanese Self-Defense Forces since 1954.

== Politics ==
The Allied occupation ended on 28 April 1952, when the terms of the Treaty of San Francisco went into effect. By the terms of the treaty, Japan regained its sovereignty, but lost many of its possessions from before World War II, including Korea (divided into South Korea and North Korea by 1948), Taiwan (the Kuomintang led by Chiang Kai-shek retreated to the island after losing control over mainland China to Mao Zedong's CCP in the Chinese Civil War, leading to the establishment of the People's Republic of China) and Sakhalin (regained by the Soviet Union and now under Russian jurisdiction). It also lost control over a number of small islands in the Pacific which it administered as League of Nations Mandates, such as the Marianas and the Marshalls. The new treaty also gave Japan the freedom to engage in international defence blocs. Japan did this on the same day it signed the San Francisco Treaty: the U.S. insisted, and Prime Minister Shigeru Yoshida agreed, to a treaty that allowed the American military to continue their use of bases in Japan.

Even before Japan regained full sovereignty, the government had rehabilitated nearly 80,000 people who had been purged, many of whom returned to their former political and government positions. A debate over limitations on military spending and the sovereignty of the emperor ensued, contributing to the great reduction in the Liberal Party's majority in the first post-occupation elections (October 1952). After several reorganizations of the armed forces, in 1954 the Self-Defense Forces were established under a civilian director. Cold War realities and the hot war in nearby Korea also contributed significantly to the United States-influenced economic redevelopment, the containment of the Soviet Union and Communist China, and the support for organized labor in Japan.

Continual fragmentation of parties and a succession of minority governments led conservative forces to merge the Liberal Party (Jiyuto) with the Japan Democratic Party (Nihon Minshuto), an offshoot of the earlier Democratic Party, to form the Liberal Democratic Party (Jiyu-Minshuto; LDP) in November 1955. This party continuously held power from 1955 through 1993, when it was replaced by a new minority government. LDP leadership was drawn from the elite who had seen Japan through the defeat and occupation; it attracted former bureaucrats, local politicians, businessmen, journalists, other professionals, farmers, and university graduates. In October 1955, socialist groups reunited under the Japan Socialist Party, which emerged as the second most powerful political force. It was followed closely in popularity by the Kōmeitō, founded in 1964 as the political arm of the Soka Gakkai (Value Creation Society), a lay former organization of the Buddhist sect Nichiren Shoshu. The Komeito emphasized traditional Japanese beliefs and attracted urban laborers, former rural residents, and many women. Like the Japan Socialist Party, it favoured the gradual modification and dissolution of the Japan-United States Mutual Security Assistance Pact.

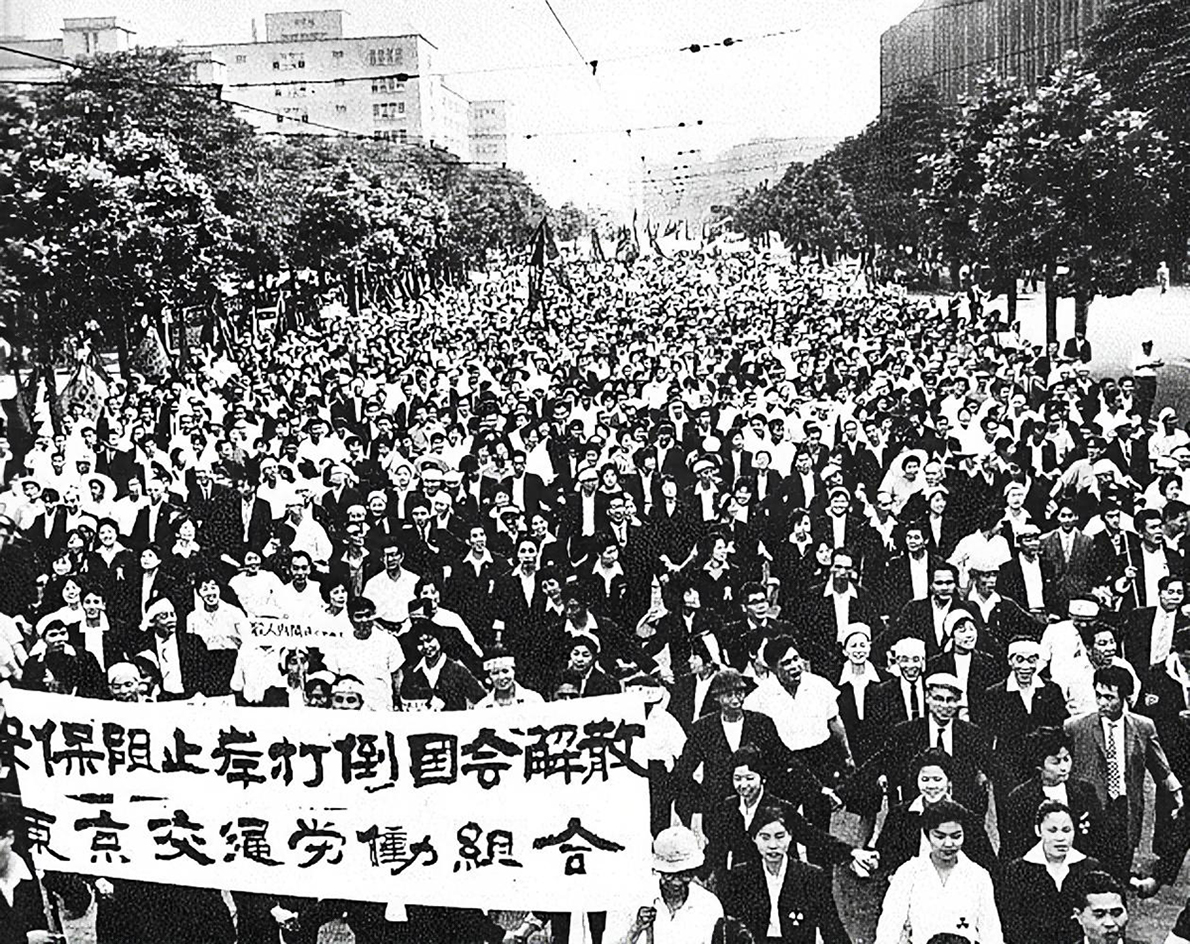
The revision of the U.S.-Japan Security Treaty in 1960 generated mass public opposition and protest.

By the late 1970s, the Komeito and the Democratic Socialist Party had come to accept the Treaty of Mutual Cooperation and Security, and the Democratic Socialist Party even came to support a small defense buildup. The Japan Socialist Party, too, was forced to abandon its once strict antimilitary stance. The United States kept up pressure on Japan to increase its defense spending above 1% of its GNP, engendering much debate in the Diet, with most opposition coming not from minority parties or public opinion but from budget-conscious officials in the Ministry of Finance.

Prime Minister Kakuei Tanaka was forced to resign in 1974 because of his alleged connection to financial scandals and, in the face of charges of involvement in the Lockheed bribery scandal, he was arrested and jailed briefly in 1976.

The fractious politics of the LDP hindered consensus in the Diet in the late 1970s. The sudden death of Prime Minister Masayoshi Ohira just before the June 1980 elections, however, brought out a sympathy vote for the party and gave the new prime minister, Zenko Suzuki, a working majority. Suzuki was soon swept up in a controversy over the publication of a textbook that appeared to many as a whitewash of Japanese aggression in World War II. This incident, and serious fiscal problems, caused the Suzuki cabinet, composed of numerous LDP factions, to fall.

Yasuhiro Nakasone, a conservative backed by the still-powerful Tanaka and Suzuki factions who once served as director general of the Defense Agency, became prime minister in November 1982. In November 1984, Nakasone was chosen for a second term as LDP president. His cabinet received an unusually high rating, a 50% favorable response in polling during his first term, while opposition parties reached a new low in popular support. As he moved into his second term, Nakasone thus held a strong position in the Diet and the nation.

Despite being found guilty of bribery in 1983, Tanaka in the early-to-mid-1980s remained a power behind the scenes through his control of the party's informal apparatus, and he continued as an influential adviser to the more internationally minded Nakasone. The end of Nakasone's tenure as prime minister in October 1987 (his second two-year term had been extended for one year) was a momentous point in modern Japanese history. Just fifteen months before Nakasone's retirement, the LDP unexpectedly had won its largest majority ever in the House of Representatives by securing 304 out of the 512 seats. The government was faced with growing crises. Land prices were rapidly increasing due to the Japanese asset price bubble, inflation increased at the highest rate since 1975, unemployment reached a record high at 3.2%, bankruptcies were rife, and there was political rancor over LDP-proposed tax reform. In the summer of 1987, economic indicators showed signs of recovery, but on October 20, 1987, the same day Nakasone officially named his successor, Noboru Takeshita, the Tokyo Stock Market crashed. Japan's economy and its political system had reached a watershed in their postwar development that would continue to play out into the 1990s.

== Economy ==
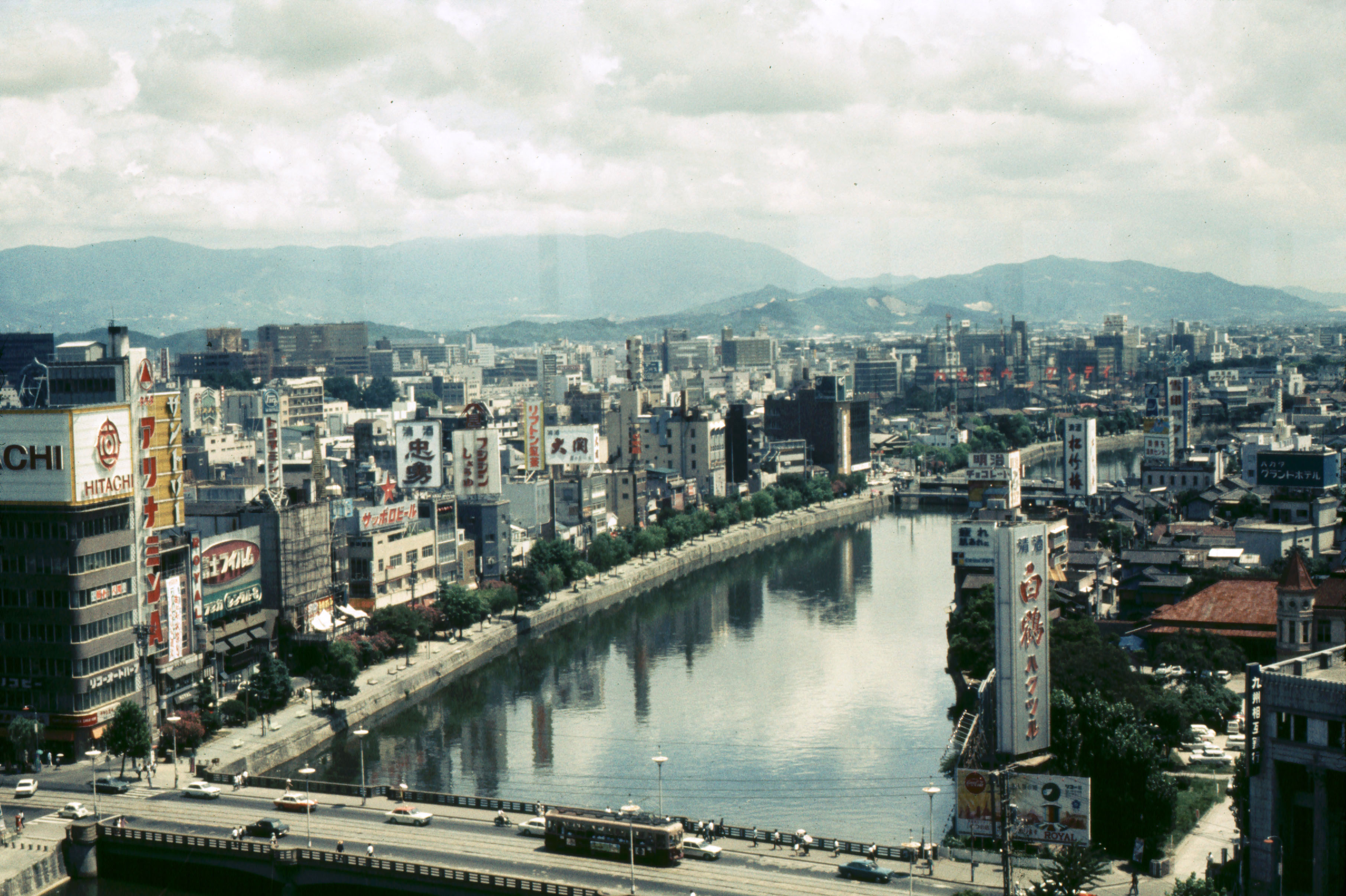
Industrial district in Fukuoka, 1970.

The early post-war years were devoted to rebuilding lost industrial capacity: major investments were made in electric power, coal, steel, and chemicals. By the mid-1950s, production matched prewar levels. Released from the demands of military-dominated government, the economy not only recovered its lost momentum but also surpassed the growth rates of earlier periods. Between 1953 and 1965, GDP expanded by more than 9% per year, manufacturing and mining by 13%, construction by 11%, and infrastructure by 12%. In 1965 these sectors employed more than 41% of the labor force, whereas only 26% remained in agriculture.

Japan's highly acclaimed post-war education system contributed strongly to the modernizing process. The world's highest literacy rate and high education standards were major reasons for Japan's success in achieving a technologically advanced economy. Japanese schools also encouraged discipline, another benefit in forming an effective work force.

The mid-1960s ushered in a new type of industrial development as the economy opened itself to international competition in some industries and developed heavy and chemical manufactures. Whereas textiles and light manufactures maintained their profitability internationally, other products, such as automobiles, electronics, ships, and machine tools assumed new importance. The value added to manufacturing and mining grew at the rate of 17% per year between 1965 and 1970. Growth rates moderated to about 8% and evened out between the industrial and service sectors between 1970 and 1973, as retail trade, finance, real estate, information technology, and other service industries streamlined their operations.

The LDP government, through institutions such as Ministry of International Trade and Industry (MITI), encouraged Japanese industrial development overseas while restricting foreign companies' business within the country. These practices, coupled with a reliance on the United States for defense, allowed Japan's economy to increase exponentially during the Cold War. By 1980, many Japanese products, particularly automobiles and electronics, were being exported around the world, and Japan's industrial sector was the second-largest in the world after the U.S. This growth pattern stagnated after 1991.

The 1964 Summer Olympics in Tokyo marked the re-emergence of Japan in the international arena: Japan's postwar development was showcased through innovations such as the Shinkansen high-speed rail network. In 1968, the first modern office skyscraper called the Kasumigaseki Building was built in Japan. It has 36 floors and is 156 meters high.

The high economic growth and political tranquillity of the mid-to-late 1960s were tempered by the quadrupling of oil prices by the Organization of the Petroleum Exporting Countries (OPEC) in 1973. Almost completely dependent on imports for petroleum, Japan experienced its first recession since World War II.

Labor unions had been destroyed by the government by 1940. The American occupation forces, reflecting their New Deal American values, supported a revival. Communist unions were included, although a proposed nationwide general strike was forbidden in 1947. After 1970, union membership declined in both Japan and the United States. According to Wythe Holt, in both countries workers had adopted consumer lifestyle and have gained the education needed to move out of blue collar jobs. Furthermore, there has been frustration with the top-down, bureaucratic management by union leaders who seem to show little interest in the aspirations of the workers.

== Foreign relations ==
Despite its central position in the world economy, Japan has played a modest role in global politics for much of the postwar period.

The 1950s were largely marked by Japan re-establishing relations to numerous nations and redefining its international role, e.g., by joining the United Nations in 1956. One such total redefinition were Japan's relations to its former World War II-ally Germany, which were put on a new basis in 1955 focused on trade.

Japan's biggest postwar political crisis took place in 1960 over the revision of the Japan-United States Mutual Security Assistance Pact. As the new Treaty of Mutual Cooperation and Security was concluded, which renewed the United States role as military protector of Japan, massive street protests and political upheaval occurred, and the cabinet resigned a month after the Diet's ratification of the treaty. Thereafter, political turmoil subsided. Japanese views of the United States, after years of mass protests over nuclear armaments and the mutual defense pact, improved by 1968 and 1972 respectively, with the reversion of United States-occupied Nanpō and Ryukyu Islands to Japanese sovereignty and the winding down of the Vietnam War.

Japan had reestablished relations with the Republic of China after World War II, and cordial relations were maintained with the nationalist government when it was exiled to Taiwan, a policy that won Japan the enmity of the People's Republic of China, which was established in 1949. After the general warming of relations between China and Western countries, especially the United States, which shocked Japan with its sudden rapprochement with Beijing in 1971 (the Ping Pong Diplomacy), Tokyo established relations with Beijing in 1972. Close cooperation in the economic sphere followed.

Japan's relations with the Soviet Union continued to be problematic after the war, but a Joint Declaration between Japan and the USSR, ending the war and reestablishing diplomatic relations was signed October 19, 1956. The main object of dispute was the Soviet occupation of what Japan calls its Northern Territories, the two most southerly islands in the Kurils (Iturup and Kunashiri) and Shikotan and the Habomai Islands (northeast of Hokkaido), which were seized by the Soviet Union shortly after Japan's World War II surrender.

Under the premiership of Kakuei Tanaka (1972–74), Japan took a stronger but still low-key stance by steadily increasing its defense spending and easing trade frictions with the United States. Tanaka's administration was also characterized by high-level talks with United States, Soviet, and Chinese leaders, if with mixed results. His visits to Indonesia and Thailand prompted riots, a manifestation of long-standing anti-Japanese sentiments.

Several cordial visits between Prime Minister Yasuhiro Nakasone and U.S. President Ronald Reagan were aimed at improving relations between their countries. Nakasone's more strident position on Japanese defense issues made him popular with some United States officials but not, generally, in Japan or among Asian neighbors. Although his characterization of Japan as an "unsinkable aircraft carrier", his noting the "common destiny" of Japan and the United States, and his calling for revisions to Article 9 of the Constitution (which renounced war as the sovereign right of the nation), among other prorearmament statements, produced negative reactions at home and abroad, a gradual acceptance emerged of the Self-Defense Forces and the mutual security treaty with the United States in the mid-1980s.

Another issue in relations with the U.S. was Japan's growing trade surplus, which reached record heights during Nakasone's first term. The United States pressured Japan to remedy the imbalance, demanding that Tokyo raise the value of the yen and open its markets further to facilitate more imports from the United States. Because the Japanese government aids and protects its key industries, it was accused of creating an unfair competitive advantage. Tokyo agreed to try to resolve these problems but generally defended its industrial policies and made concessions on trade restrictions very reluctantly.

== Culture ==
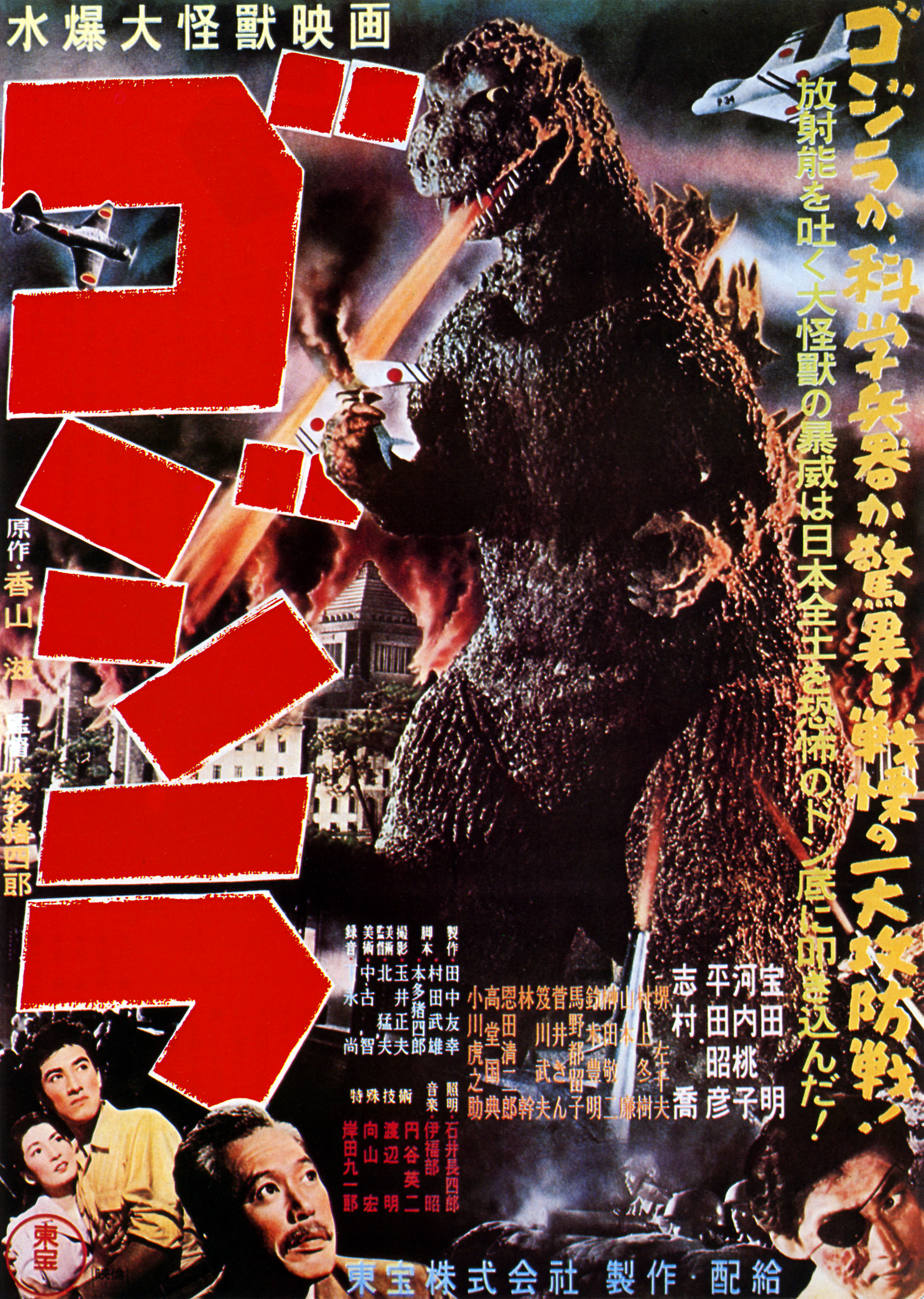
The 1954 film Godzilla became one of Japan's first major pop cultural exports in the postwar era.

Japan continued to experience Westernization in the postwar era, much of which came about during the occupation, when American soldiers were a common sight in many parts of the country. American music and movies became popular, spurring a generation of Japanese artists who built on both Western and Japanese influences.

During this period, Japan also began to emerge as an exporter of culture. Young people across the world began consuming kaiju (monster) movies, anime (animation), manga (comic books), and other modern Japanese culture. Japanese authors such as Yasunari Kawabata and Yukio Mishima became popular literary figures in America and Europe. American soldiers returning from the occupation brought with them stories and artifacts, and the following generations of U.S. troops in Japan contributed to a steady trickle of martial arts and other culture from the country.

== Timeline to 1989 ==
- 1945: Surrender of Japan to the Allies and Allied occupation starts (September 2)
- 1946: Emperor Hirohito renounces his own divinity (January 1)
- 1947: Enforcement of the constitutional amendment (May 3)
- 1948–1951: Red Purge
- 1949: Hideki Yukawa awarded the Nobel Prize in Physics.
- 1950: National Police Reserve (predecessor of the Japan Ground Self-Defense Force) established. (August 10)
- 1952: Allied occupation ends with the entry into force of the Treaty of San Francisco and the Security Treaty between the United States and Japan, Continuation of stationing of the United States Forces Japan and American occupation of the Amami Islands, Bonin Islands and Ryukyu Islands (April 28).
- 1953: Amami Islands under American occupation revert to Japan (December 25)
- 1954: the Japan Self-Defense Forces established. (July 1)
- 1955: the Liberal Democratic Party formed. (November 15)
- 1956: Japan joins the United Nations. (December 18)
- 1956: Japan signs the reparations agreement with the Philippines as compensation during the war and the Soviet–Japanese Joint Declaration.
- 1960: Labor strikes and protest marches across the country as part of the massive Anpo protests to oppose the adoption of a revised Treaty of Mutual Cooperation and Security between the United States and Japan. (June 23)
- 1964: Shinkansen trains begin service (October 1) and Summer Olympic Games held in Tokyo. (October 10-24)
- 1965: Treaty on Basic Relations between Japan and the Republic of Korea entered into force (December 18). Shin'ichiro Tomonaga awarded the Nobel Prize in Physics.
- 1968: the nuclear aircraft carrier Enterprise arrives in Sasebo amid controversy. Itai-itai disease is formally recognized as a public hazard disease. Bonin Islands under American occupation revert to Japanese control. Yasunari Kawabata receives the Nobel Prize in Literature. A man, disguised as a police officer, steals ¥300 million (still at large as of 2025).
- 1969: Student protests erupt at several Japanese universities in opposition to campus policies and the Vietnam War. The occupation of Tokyo University forces the administration to cancel the entrance exams. Prime Minister Eisaku Satō and U.S. President Richard Nixon meet. The date for the return of Ryukyu Islands (Okinawa Prefecture) to Japanese sovereignty set for sometime in 1972.
- 1970: a World Exposition (Expo '70) held in Osaka (March 15 - September 13).
- 1971: the yen moves to a floating exchange rate, contributing to a short slump in Japan's economic boom.
- 1972: Ryukyu Islands under American occupation reverts to Japan as Okinawa Prefecture (May 15). Normalization of diplomatic relations with the People's Republic of China (September 29).
- 1973: Japan joins the Group of Four, Forming the Group of Five.
- 1980: annual car production tops 10 million units, making Japan the world's largest car producer after the US. Yomiuri Giants' Sadaharu Oh ends his career.
- 1981: Kenichi Fukui awarded the Nobel Prize in Chemistry.
- 1982: the Tohoku Shinkansen extended to Morioka from Omiya.
- 1983: Mt. Oyama volcano on Miyakejima, one of the Izu Islands, erupts. A color wall painting of Genbu is discovered in the Kitora Kofun at Asuka-mura. Kakuei Tanaka sentenced to four years in jail.
- 1984: the president of Ezaki Glico Co., Ltd., a manufacturer of sweets, is abducted and held for ¥10 billion and 100 kg gold ransom, but he escapes. Later, an extortionist threatens to poison the company's products unless paid ¥60 million (later raised to ¥120 million). The culprit is never captured. New banknotes issued with the likeness of Fukuzawa Yukichi on the ¥10,000 bill, Inazo Nitobe on the ¥5,000 bill, and Natsume Sōseki on the ¥1,000 bill.
- 1985: the first AIDS patient is officially recognized. Japan Air Lines Flight 123 crashes into Mount Takamagahara, breaking the record for aircraft-crash casualties with 520 dead and only four survivors.
- 1986: Mount Mihara (Miharayama) on Izu Ohshima erupts, but the island's population is evacuated beforehand.
- 1987: Japanese National Railways is privatized and split into seven JR (Japan Railways) companies, six regional companies and one freight. Actor Yujiro Ishihara dies.
- 1988: the Seikan Tunnel connecting Hokkaido and Honshu completed. The Nadashio, a Maritime Self Defense Force submarine, collides with the Dai Ichi Fujimaru, a fishing vessel.
- 1989: Emperor Shōwa dies and his eldest son, Akihito, ascends to the throne (January 7). Heisei era starts (January 8).

== See also ==
- 1980s in Japan
- 1990s in Japan

Preceded by Surrender of Japan	History of Japan; Postwar Japan; 1945–1989	Succeeded by Heisei Era
