= Rahmon (name) =

Rahmon is a given name and surname. Notable people with the name include:

== Given name ==
- Rahmon Adedoyin (born 1957), Nigerian educationist and businessman
- Rahmon Fletcher (born 1988), American former professional basketball player
- Rahmon Nabiyev (1930–1993), First Secretary of the Communist Party of Tajikistan from 1982 to 1985 and President of Tajikistan in 1991 and from 1991 to 1992

== Surname ==
- Emomali Rahmon (born 1952), President of Tajikistan since 1994
  - Ozoda Rahmon (born 1978), Tajik politician and the daughter of Emomali
- Mufutau Oloyede Abdul-Rahmon, Nigerian professor of Arabic and Islamic studies

== See also ==
- Rahman (name)
- Raimon (name)
