= 1980s in Japan =

In Japan during the 1980s, the economy was in a boom where buyers found themselves paying the highest prices for goods and commodities. As of March 1980, the unemployment rate in Japan was 4.9%; a very low number compared to the unemployment rate during the height of the 1990s. The following decade would see Japan's economy decline substantially, giving rise to the name the Lost Decade.

== Entertainment ==
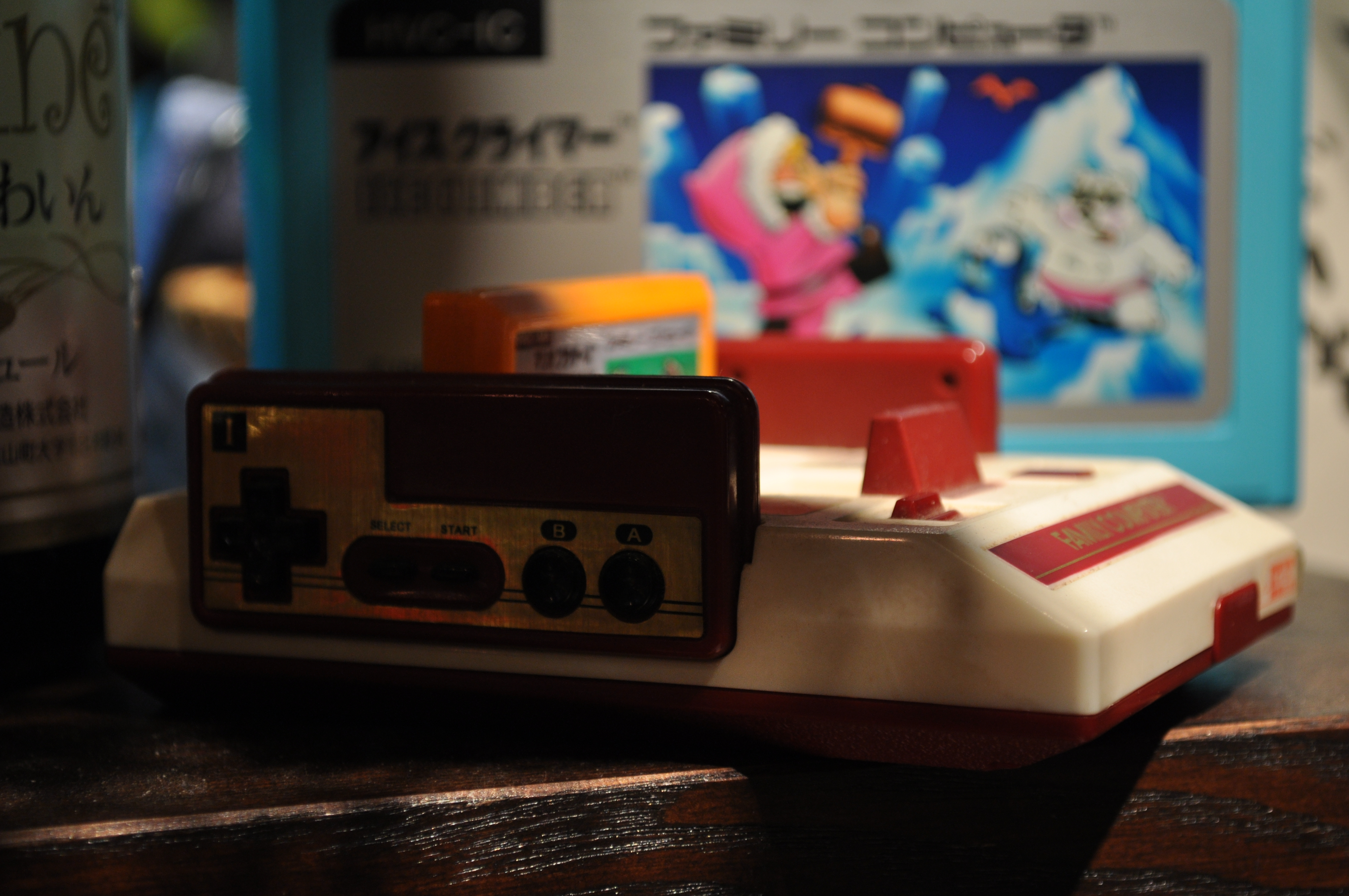
Photo of a Famicom video game console with controller

The 1980s saw the firm establishment of anime and manga as major forms of entertainment for the Japanese public. Studio Ghibli, arguably the most famous and respected animation studio in Japan, was established by Hayao Miyazaki, Isao Takahata, and Toshio Suzuki in 1985 following the success of Miyazaki's Nausicaä of the Valley of the Wind. Newtype, one of the two major anime industry magazines, was started in 1985 as well.

Examples of Japanese products created and distributed during the 1980s included Donkey Kong, Super Mario Bros., and classic anime like Astro Boy and Akira. Nintendo Co., Ltd. (NCL) came of age offering video arcade games and their famous Family Computer (also known as the Famicom) video game system. American-based Atari struggled to compete in Japan but they couldn't defeat the Sega-Nintendo duopoly in the video arcade realm. Future Japanese game designers would cut their teeth during this era playing 8-bit games and end up designing video games on much more complicated architectures (systems like the Nintendo 64 and the Game Boy).

Professional wrestling was declining in the 1980s in Japan, even though the WWF was experiencing a boom worldwide. Even the most predominant men's and women's wrestling leagues were losing popularity like America's World Wrestling Federation. By the 2000s, professional wrestling was relegated to the midnight hours by television broadcasting. However, a few crucial championships would bring women's wrestling into a new era of the 1980s.

Osamu Tezuka, considered the "god of manga" in Japan, died on 9 February 1989. Hibari Misora, one of the most popular and best selling female pop artists in Japan, died on 24 June 1989. She had held her last public performance in Kitakyushu in February that same year.

=== Cinema, television, and video ===
Award-winning live action films released during the 1980s include Zigeunerweisen (1980), Kagemusha (1980), Station (1981), Fall Guy (1982), The Ballad of Narayama (1983), The Funeral (1984), Gray Sunset (1985), House on Fire (1986), A Taxing Woman (1987), The Silk Road (1988), and Black Rain (1989).

NHK started experimental broadcasting of TV program using the BS-2a satellite in May 1984. The satellite BS-2a was launched in preparation for the start of full scale 2-channel broadcasts. Broadcasting Satellite BS-2a was the first national DBS (direct broadcasting satellite), transmitting signals directly into the home of TV viewers. One of the three transponders malfunctioned 2 months after launch (March 23, 1984) and a second transponder malfunctioned 3 months after launch (May 3, 1984), so the scheduled satellite broadcasting had to be hastily adjusted to test broadcasting on a single channel.

Later, NHK started regular service (NTSC) and experimental HDTV broadcasting using BS-2b in June 1989. Some Japanese producers of home electronic consumer devices began to deliver TV sets, VCRs and even home acoustic systems equipped with built-in satellite tuners or receivers. Such electronic goods had a specific BS logo.

=== Music ===
During the 1980s, Japan had the second largest music market in the world. Idols included Seiko Matsuda, Akina Nakamori, Hiroko Yakushimaru, Yōko Oginome, Yoko Minamino, Chisato Moritaka and Wink. Artists in the new music genre included Saki Kubota. Rock bands included Rebecca and the Southern All Stars. Artists in the techno-pop genre included Yellow Magic Orchestra. The song "Hana" (1980) by Shoukichi Kina, was a hit overseas, and sold 30 million copies. Eiichi Ohtaki released A Long Vacation.

== Demographics ==
Two cities were named designated cities during the 1980s: Hiroshima in 1980, and Sendai in 1989.

=== Population ===
Birth and death rates of Japan since 1950. The drop in 1966 was due to it being a "hinoe uma" year which is viewed as a bad omen by the Japanese Zodiac.

The birth rate in Japan continued to drop significantly during the 1980s, dropping from about 14 births per thousand to about 10 births per thousand. Deaths per thousand saw a slight increase from about 5.5 to about 6. The aging of the population was already becoming evident in the aging of the labor force and the shortage of young workers in the late-1980s, with potential impacts on employment practices, wages and benefits, and the roles of women in the labor force.

In addition, the median age of the elderly population was rising in the late 1980s. The proportion of people age 65–85 was expected to increase from 6% in 1985 to 15% in 2025. Because the incidence of chronic disease increases with age, the health care and pension systems are expected to come under severe strain. In the mid-1980s the government began to reevaluate the relative burdens of government and the private sector in health care and pensions, and it established policies to control government costs in these programs. Recognizing the lower probability that an elderly person will be residing with an adult child and the higher probability of any daughter or daughter-in-law's participation in the paid labor force, the government encouraged establishment of nursing homes, day-care facilities for the elderly, and home health programs. Longer life spans are altering relations between spouses and across generations, creating new government responsibilities, and changing virtually all aspects of social life.

=== Internal migration ===
Between 6 million and 7 million people moved their residences each year during the 1980s. About 50% of these moves were within the same prefecture; the others were relocations from one prefecture to another. During Japan's economic development in the twentieth century, and especially during the 1950s and 1960s, migration was characterized by urbanization as people from rural areas in increasing numbers moved to the larger metropolitan areas in search of better jobs and education. Out-migration from rural prefectures continued in the late 1980s, but more slowly than in previous decades.

In the 1980s, government policy provided support for new urban development away from the large cities, particularly Tokyo, and assisted regional cities to attract young people to live and work there. Regional cities offered familiarity to those from nearby areas, lower costs of living, shorter commutes, and, in general, a more relaxed life-style than could be had in larger cities. Young people continued to move to large cities, however, to attend universities and find work, but some returned to regional cities (a pattern known as U-turn) or to their prefecture of origin (a pattern referred to as J-turn).

Government statistics show that in the 1980s significant numbers of people left the largest central cities (Tokyo and Osaka) to move to suburbs within their metropolitan areas. In 1988 more than 500,000 people left Tokyo, which experienced a net loss through migration of nearly 73,000 for the year. Osaka had a net loss of nearly 36,000 in the same year. However, the prefectures showing the highest net growth are located near the major urban centers, such as Saitama, Chiba, Ibaraki, and Kanagawa around Tokyo, and Hyogo, Nara, and Shiga near Osaka and Kyoto. This pattern suggests a process of suburbanization, people moving away from the cities for affordable housing but still commuting there for work and recreation, rather than a true decentralization.

== Economy ==
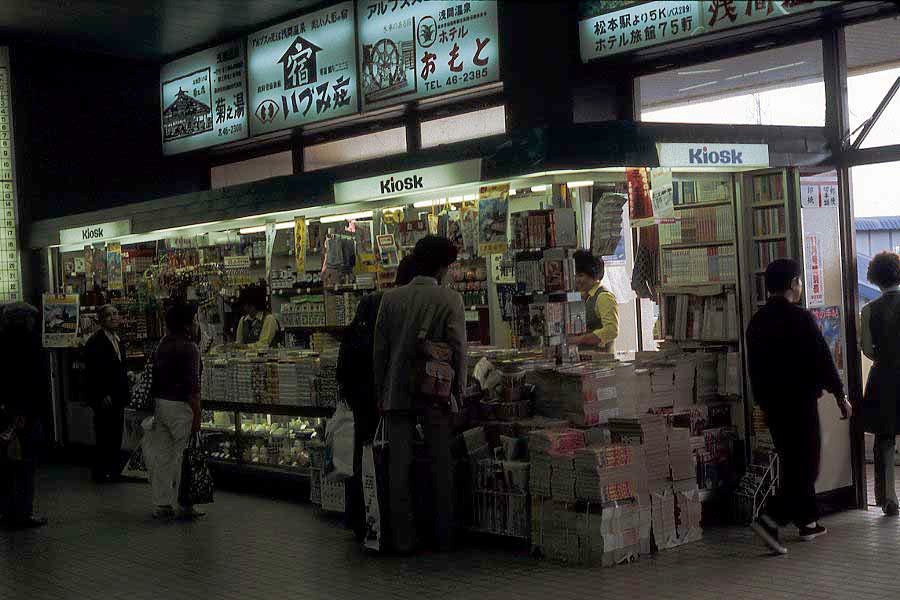
Customers at a kiosk in Matsumoto station, 1982

Overall real economic growth was called a "miracle", with a 4% average during the 1980s. Throughout the 1970s, Japan had the world's second largest gross national product (GNP)—just behind the United States— and ranked first among major industrial nations in 1990 in per capita GNP at US$23,801, up sharply from US$9,068 in 1980. After a mild economic slump in the mid-1980s, Japan's economy began a period of expansion in 1986 that continued until it again entered a recessionary period in 1992. Economic growth averaging 5% between 1987 and 1989 revived industries, such as steel and construction, which had been relatively dormant in the mid-1980s, and brought record salaries and employment.

Unlike the economic booms of the 1960s and 1970s, when increasing exports played the key role in economic expansion, domestic demand propelled the Japanese economy in the late 1980s. This development involved fundamental economic restructuring, moving from dependence on exports to reliance on domestic demand. The boom that started in 1986 was generated by the decisions of companies to increase private plant and equipment spending and of consumers to go on a buying spree. Japan's imports grew at a faster rate than exports. Japanese postwar technological research was carried out for the sake of economic growth rather than military development. The growth in high-technology industries in the 1980s resulted from heightened domestic demand for high-technology products and for higher living, housing, and environmental standards; better health, medical, and welfare opportunities; better leisure-time facilities; and improved ways to accommodate a rapidly aging society.

Japan introduced the national consumption tax of three percent in 1989.

=== Finances ===
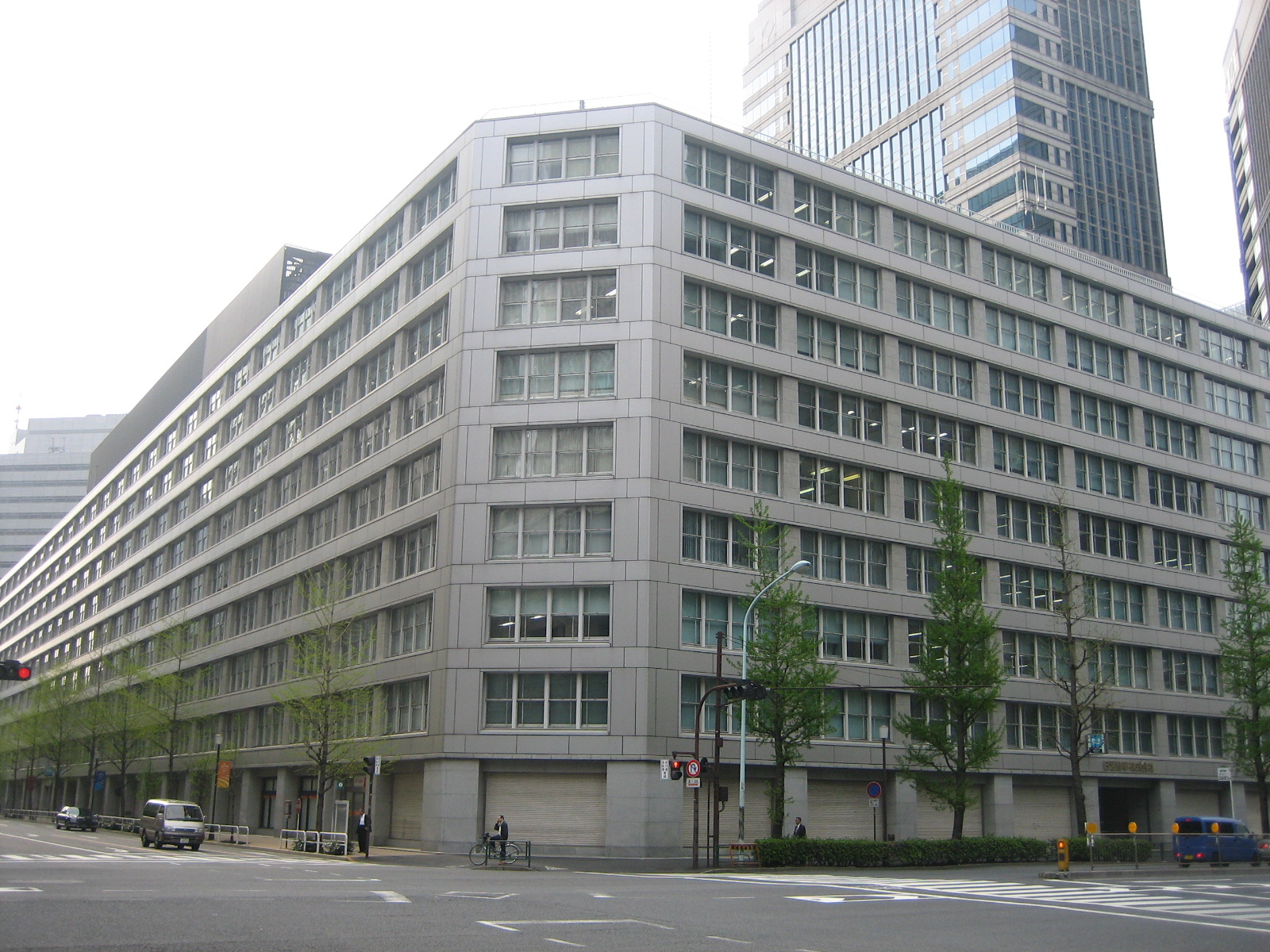
Mitsubishi Estate

Tokyo became a major financial center, home of some of the world's major banks, financial firms, insurance companies, and the world's largest stock exchange, the Tokyo Securities and Stock Exchange. Even here, however, the recession took its toll. In the decades following World War II, Japan implemented stringent tariffs and policies to encourage the people to save their income.

With more money in banks, loans and credit became easier to obtain, and with Japan running large trade surpluses, the yen appreciated against foreign currencies. This allowed local companies to invest in capital resources much more easily than their competitors overseas, which reduced the price of Japanese-made goods and widened the trade surplus further. And, with the yen appreciating, financial assets became very lucrative.

With so much money readily available for investment, speculation was inevitable, particularly in the Tokyo Stock Exchange and the real estate market. The Nikkei stock index hit its all-time high on December 29, 1989, when it reached an intra-day high of 38,957.44 before closing at 38,915.87. The rates for housing, stocks, and bonds rose so much that at one point the government issued 100-year bonds. Additionally, banks granted increasingly risky loans.

The Plaza Accord was signed in September 1985. This agreement between the governments of France, West Germany, Japan, the United States and the United Kingdom, was to depreciate the US dollar in relation to the Japanese yen and German Deutsche Mark by intervening in currency markets. The exchange rate value of the dollar versus the yen declined by 51% from 1985 to 1987. Most of this devaluation was due to the $10 billion spent by the participating central banks. Currency speculation caused the dollar to continue its fall after the end of coordinated interventions.

The recessionary effects of the strengthened yen in Japan's export-dependent economy created an incentive for the expansionary monetary policies that led to the Japanese asset price bubble of the late 1980s. The Louvre Accord was signed in 1987 to halt the continuing decline of the US Dollar. The signing of the Plaza Accord was significant in that it reflected Japan's emergence as a real player in managing the international monetary system.

=== Health care ===
National health expenditures rose from about 1 trillion yen in 1965 to nearly 20 trillion yen in 1989, or from slightly more than 5% to more than 6% of Japan's national income. The system has been troubled with excessive paperwork, assembly-line care for out-patients (because few facilities made appointments), over medication, and abuse of the system because of low out-of-pocket costs to patients. Another problem is an uneven distribution of health personnel, with rural areas favored over cities.

By the early 1980s, pensions accounted for nearly 50% of social welfare and social security expenditures because people were living longer after retirement. A major revision in the public pension system in 1986 unified several former plans into the single Employee Pension Insurance Plan. In addition to merging the former plans, the 1986 reform attempted to reduce benefits to hold down increases in worker contribution rates. It also established the right of women who did not work outside the home to pension benefits of their own, not only as a dependent of a worker. Everyone aged between twenty and sixty was a compulsory member of this Employee Pension Insurance Plan.

Despite complaints that these pensions amounted to little more than "spending money", an increasing number of people planning for their retirement counted on them as an important source of income. Benefits increased so that the basic monthly pension was about US$420 in 1987, with future payments adjusted to the consumer price index. Forty percent of elderly households in 1985 depended on various types of annuities and pensions as their only sources of income.

Some people are also eligible for corporate retirement allowances. About 90% of firms with thirty or more employees gave retirement allowances in the late 1980s, frequently as lump sum payments but increasingly in the form of annuities.

In the late 1980s, government and professional circles were considering changing the system so that primary, secondary, and tertiary levels of care would be clearly distinguished within each geographical region. Further, facilities would be designated by level of care and referrals would be required to obtain more complex care. Policy makers and administrators also recognized the need to unify the various insurance systems and to control costs.

=== Manufacturing ===
During the 1980s, the Japanese economy shifted its emphasis away from primary and secondary activities (notably agriculture, manufacturing, and mining) to processing, with telecommunications and computers becoming increasingly vital. Information became an important resource and product, central to wealth and power. The rise of an information-based economy was led by major research in highly sophisticated technology, such as advanced computers. The selling and use of information became very beneficial to the economy.

Japanese cars had a 33% hold on the American automobile market at that time and then-current U.S. President Ronald Reagan waged a price war against the new Japanese automobiles. As a result, Japanese auto manufacturers took advantage of their vehicles' superior MPG (miles per gallon) rating.

=== Real estate ===
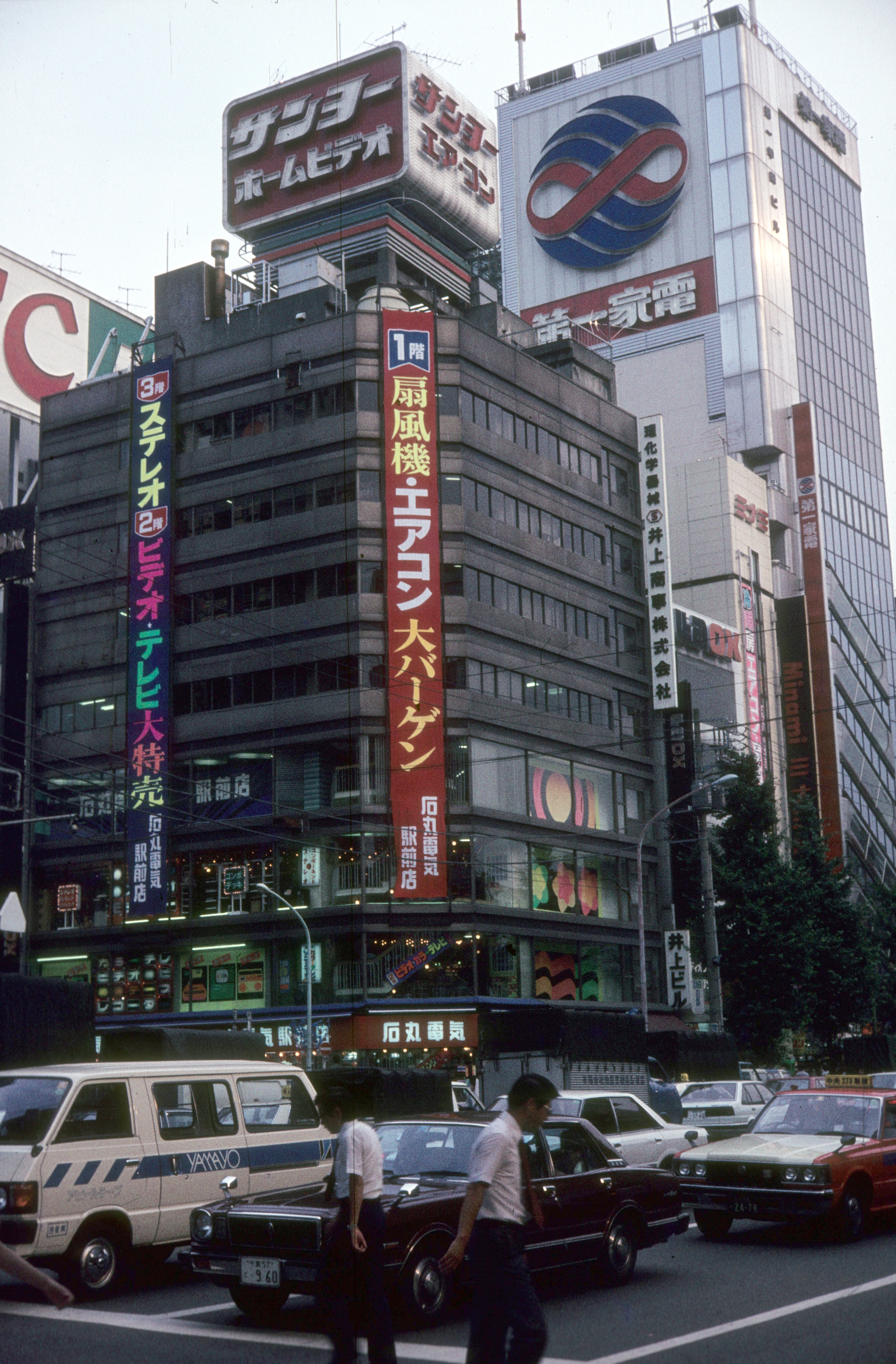
Ginza, Tokyo in 1985

At the height of the bubble, real estate values were extremely over-valued. Between 1955 and 1989, land prices in the six largest cities increased 15,000% (+12% a year). Urban land prices generally increased 40% from 1980 to 1987; in the six largest cities, the price of land doubled over that period. For many families, this trend put housing in central cities out of reach. The result was lengthy commutes for many workers; daily commutes of two hours each way are not uncommon in the Tokyo area.

Prices were highest in Tokyo's Ginza district in 1989, with choice properties fetching over US$1.5 million per square meter ($139,000 per square foot). Prices were only slightly less in other areas of Tokyo.

== Environment ==
In 1984, the Environmental Agency had issued its first white paper. In the 1989 study, citizens thought environmental problems had improved compared with the past, nearly 41% thought things had improved, 31% thought that they had stayed the same, and nearly 21% thought that they had worsened. Some 75% of those surveyed expressed concern about endangered species, shrinkage of rain forests, expansion of deserts, destruction of the ozone layer, acid rain, and increased water and air pollution in developing countries. Most believed that Japan, alone or in cooperation with other industrialized countries, had the responsibility to solve environmental problems.

After the moratorium on commercial whaling in 1986, Japanese government started its whaling for research purposes the following year. This whaling program has been criticized by environmental protection groups and anti-whaling countries, who say that the program was not for scientific researches.

=== National parks ===
Several national and quasi-national parks were established during the 1980s. Hidaka Sanmyaku-Erimo Quasi-National Park in Hokkaidō is the largest quasi-national park in Japan and was opened in October 1981. Kushiro Shitsugen National Park in Hokkaidō, known for its wetlands, was opened in July 1987.

=== Natural disasters ===
On May 26, 1983, a tsunami caused by a 7.7 magnitude earthquake in the Sea of Japan killed 107 people, including three in South Korea.

Mount Ontake, thought to be inactive, had a series of eruptions in 1980. In 1981, the caldera lake volcano Lake Shikotsu erupted in Hokkaidō, followed in 1982 by Mount Tarumae, which is located on its shores. Mount Kusatsu-Shirane in Kusatsu, Gunma Prefecture, erupted in 1983. The Kaitoku Seamount erupted in 1984, Mount Tokachi—located in Hokkaidō—and Izu-Tobu—located on the Izu Peninsula—erupted in 1989.

== Politics ==
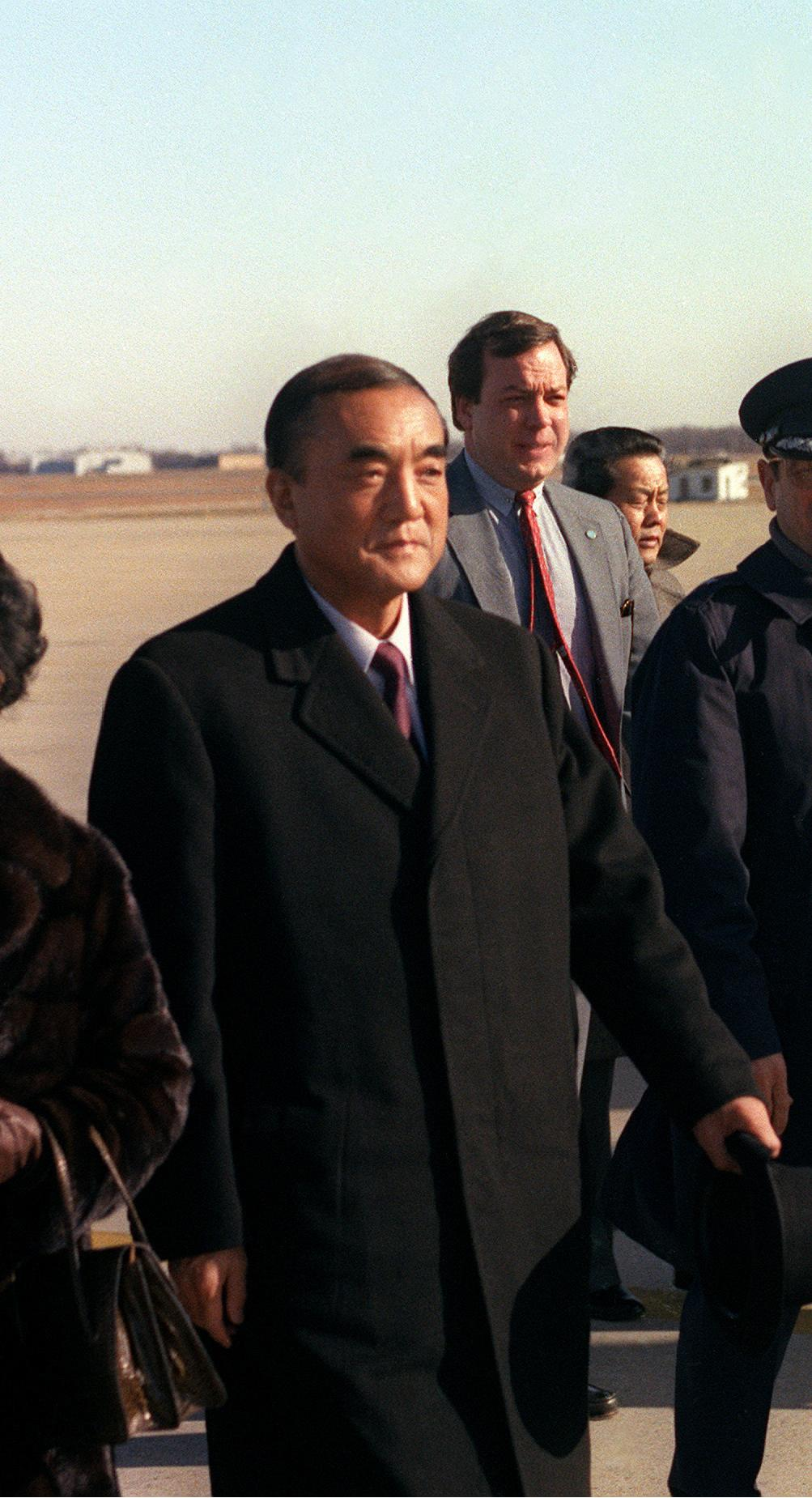
Yasuhiro Nakasone

Hirohito, the emperor Shōwa, died in the year 1989 after reigning for more than 60 years, ending the Shōwa era. His son Akihito acceded to the throne in 1989, starting the Heisei era. He would have been, at the time of his abdication in 2019, the 20th most senior monarch or lifelong leader. He is the world's only reigning monarch whose title is customarily translated into English as "Emperor" (as is Akihito's successor, Naruhito).

There were a number of prime ministers who served during the 1980s. Masayoshi Ōhira had to finish his second term in June 1980 and call early elections when the LDP's Fukuda, Nakasone and Miki factions abstained or voted with the opposition in a vote of no-confidence. He was only the second Christian to hold this office, the first having been Tetsu Katayama (1947–1948). Zenkō Suzuki was appointed LDP president and Prime Minister following the sudden death of Ōhira, who died of a heart attack during the 1980 general election campaign. The sympathy vote generated by Ohira's death resulted in a landslide for the ruling LDP, handing Suzuki the largest parliamentary majority any Prime Minister had enjoyed for many years, and silencing inner-party opposition. Suzuki chose not to run for reelection to the presidency of the LDP in 1982, and was succeeded by Yasuhiro Nakasone in November 1982.

Yasuhiro Nakasone served three terms and implemented a policy of economic liberalization. Among his biggest projects was the privatization of the Japanese National Railways. On foreign policy, he sought close alignment with the United States maintaining a personal friendship with U.S. president Ronald Reagan. Nakasone gained notoriety among the various non-Japanese ethnic groups in Japan (particularly the sizeable Korean minority) for proclaiming that Japan's success was because it did not have ethnic minorities, like the US. He then clarified his comments, stating that he meant to congratulate the US on its economic success despite the presence of "problematic" minorities. Nakasone was replaced by Noboru Takeshita in November 1987, and both were implicated, along with other LDP lawmakers, in the Recruit scandal that broke the following year.

In June 1989, Sōsuke Uno became Prime Minister only to resign less than three months later in August 1989 amid a sex scandal revealed by a geisha. The controversy surrounding Uno's extramarital affair was more focused on irresponsibility rather than immorality; Uno supposedly did not support his mistress, at the least not with an appropriate amount, which led her to complain publicly. The story was not widely publicized in Japan until The Washington Post picked up the story from the Mainichi Shimbun, bringing international attention to Uno. Following Uno's resignation, most LDP lawmakers refused to associate with him, and he quickly lost control over his faction within the party. He was succeeded by the final Prime Minister of the 1980s, Toshiki Kaifu, who was seen as a reformer within the LDP. Kaifu's appointment was a reaction to the political scandals of the late 1980s, but his attempts to reform the party were ultimately unsuccessful. The defeat in the House of Councillors elections of 1989 was the prelude for the LDP's decline as dominant party in the 1990s.

=== International agreements ===
Japan signed the United Nations Convention on the Law of the Sea, defining the rights and responsibilities of nations in their use of the world's oceans, establishing guidelines for businesses, the environment, and the management of marine natural resources, in December 1982. In November 1983, Japan agreed to the International Tropical Timber Agreement. The Montreal Protocol on Substances That Deplete the Ozone Layer was agreed upon in September 1987. The Basel Convention on the Control of Transboundary Movements of Hazardous Wastes and Their Disposal was signed in March 1989.

== See also ==
- 2000s in Japan
