= Arola (disambiguation) =

Arola may refer to:

== Places ==
- Arola, a town in Piedmont, Italy

== People ==
- Raimon Arola, a Spanish art historian and essayist
- Alfredo Arola Blanquet, a Spanish socialist politician

== Companies ==
- Arola SARL, a French microcar manufacturer now part of the Aixam Group
