= Raimon (name) =

Raimon may refer to:

== People ==
- Raimon – Spanish singer
- Raimon Arola – Spanish art historian
- Raimon d'Avinhon – French troubadour
- Raimon Carrasco – Spanish businessman (1924–2022)
- Raimon Casellas – Catalan author (1855–1910)
- Raimon de Durfort and Turc Malec
- Raimon Escrivan – French troubadour and poet
- Raimon Gaucelm de Bezers – French troubadour
- Raimon Jordan – Occitan noble and troubadour
- Raimon de Miraval – French troubadour
- Raimon Obiols – Spanish politician
- Raimon Panikkar – Spanish-Indian Catholic priest and theologian (1918–2010)
- Raimon Tolosana-Delgado – Spanish geostatistician (born 1976)
- Raimon de Tors de Marseilha – French troubadour
- Raimon Vidal de Bezaudun – Catalan troubadour

== See also ==
- Raimon Land – Thai real estate company
