= One City Centre (Bangkok) =

ONE CITY CENTRE
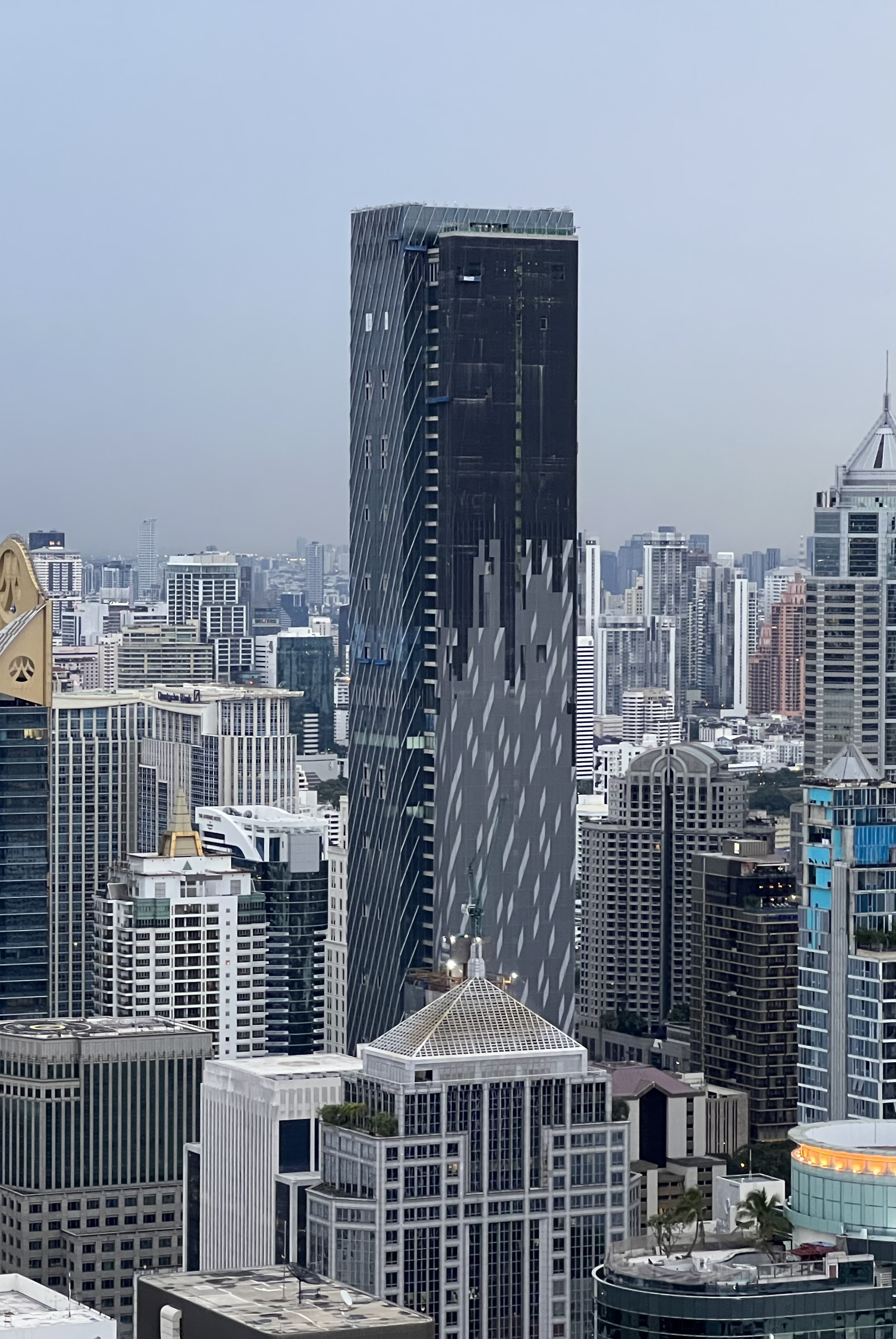
- Interactive map of the ONE CITY CENTRE area
- Alternative names: OCC

General information
- Status: Completed
- Architectural style: Contemporary modern
- Location: 548 Phloen Chit Road, Lumphini, Pathum Wan, Bangkok 10330, Thailand
- Coordinates: 13°44′34.0″N 100°32′48.3″E
- Construction started: February 2019
- Completed: March 2023
- Owner: Raimon Land; Mitsubishi Estate

Height
- Height: 905 feet (276 m)

Technical details
- Floor count: 61

Design and construction
- Architects: Skidmore, Owings & Merrill Co., Ltd. (Thailand)
- Developer: Raimon Land; Mitsubishi Estate
- Engineer: Meinhardt Group
- Other designers: Design 103 International Ltd.
- Main contractor: Bouygues-Thai Ltd.

Website
- www.onecitycentrebangkok.com

One City Centre (OCC) is a skyscraper on Ploen Chit Road in Bangkok, Thailand. Thailand's tallest office tower and fifth tallest building, One City Centre opened in 2023.

== The tallest office building in Bangkok CBD ==
The OCC is the tallest Grade A+ office building in Bangkok (275.8 meters / 905 feet). It offers a total leasable area of 61,000 square meters, which includes 57,000 square meters for offices and 4,000 square meters for Retail and F&B Shops. The development comprises a 61-story office building and a three-story retail structure. The tower is conveniently connected to the Phloen Chit BTS station on the Sukhumvit Line via a skywalk, ensuring easy access from various parts of Bangkok.

The building features a Sky Lobby on the 37th floor for efficient transportation to higher levels. The upper floors house a rooftop bar and restaurant, offering panoramic views of the city. On the lower levels, plazas and retail shops take up half of the site, featuring Japanese eateries and renowned local food courts. Additionally, the building includes co-working spaces and rental conference rooms in communal areas. The property is equipped with modern facilities, such as a ticketless parking system, an exclusive app for building workers, and facial recognition technology, catering to post-pandemic tenant needs. Parking accommodations include 837 spaces (Automated - 400 spaces (5th-10th) and Conventional parking - 437 spaces (B1-B4) with EV charging bays (B1))

The building meets international standards as a Premium Grade A+ office space and has been awarded 2-star Fitwel and LEED certifications.

== Location and Transportation ==
One City Centre is located on Ploenchit Road, conveniently close to the BTS Skytrain, and features a connecting bridge for easy access. The location is well-served by various forms of public transportation, promoting the use of BTS and buses over private vehicles, which helps lower greenhouse gas emissions. Additionally, the building offers amenities such as electric vehicle charging stations and bicycle racks.

== Anchor tenants ==
The Boston Consulting Group (Thailand) Ltd., BNP Paribas Bangkok Branch, CBRE (Thailand) Co. Ltd., Amadeus Asia Ltd., Marubeni Thailand Co. Ltd., Mitsubishi Heavy Industries (Thailand) Ltd., Mitsubishi Power (Thailand) Ltd., KOKUYO International (Thailand) Co., Ltd., and Nihon M&A Center (Thailand) Co. Ltd.
