= Mitsubishi Estate =

Japanese real estate developer

Mitsubishi Estate Company, Limited

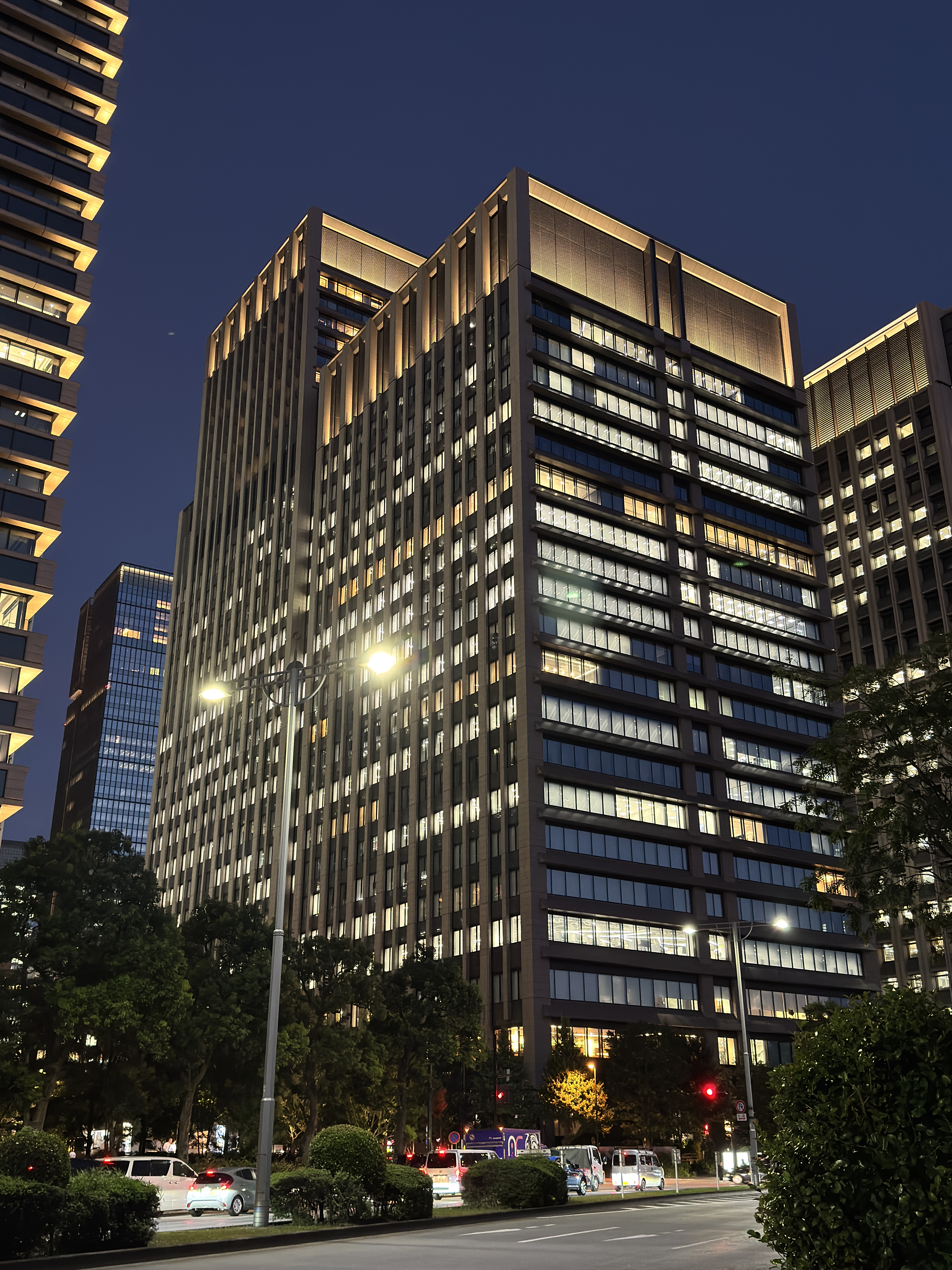
- Native name: 三菱地所株式会社
- Romanized name: Mitsubishi Jisho kabushiki gaisha
- Type: Public
- Traded as: TYO: 8802; TOPIX Core 30 Component
- Industry: Real estate
- Predecessor: Mitsubishi Goshi Kaisha
- Founded: 7 May 1937; 89 years ago
- Headquarters: Otemachi Building; 6-1, Otemachi 1-chome Chiyoda-ku, Tokyo, Japan
- Area served: Japan; China; Vietnam; Singapore; United Kingdom; United States; Malaysia; Indonesia
- Key people: Junichi Yoshida (Chairman); Atsushi Nakajima (President)
- Website: www.mec.co.jp/index_e.htm

Mitsubishi Estate Company, Limited (三菱地所株式会社, Mitsubishi Jisho kabushiki gaisha; MEC) is one of the largest real estate developers in Japan and is involved in property management and architecture research and design.

As of 2018, Mitsubishi Estate has the most valuable portfolio in the Japanese real estate industry, with a total value of approx. 7.4 trillion yen, much of which is located in the Marunouchi district of Tokyo. MEC owns Japan's third tallest building, the Yokohama Landmark Tower, as well as the Sanno Park Tower and Marunouchi Building in Tokyo. Mitsubishi Estate has its headquarters in the Otemachi Building in Ōtemachi, Chiyoda, Tokyo. It is one of the core Mitsubishi companies.

== History ==
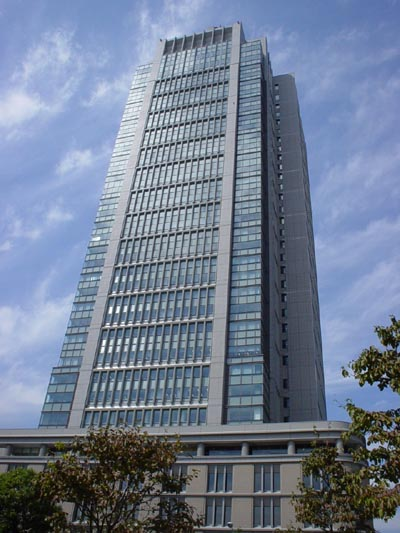
The Marunouchi Building, which was completed in 2002

The company was established in 1937 as a spin-off of the real estate holdings of the Mitsubishi zaibatsu. It was listed on the Tokyo and Osaka stock exchanges in 1953.

Its largest concentration of assets is around the Daimaruyū area (Ōtemachi, Marunouchi and Yūrakuchō districts) west of Tokyo and Yūrakuchō Stations, an area purchased by the zaibatsu from the Meiji government in 1890 and developed into an office district. Today, the area houses the headquarters of Mitsubishi Corporation, Mitsubishi UFJ Financial Group, MUFG Bank, Mitsubishi UFJ Trust & Banking, Mitsubishi Heavy Industries, Mitsubishi Electric, Meiji Yasuda Life, Nippon Yusen and other Mitsubishi group companies, as well as numerous other firms not affiliated with the group.

In 1990 Mitsubishi Estate fully bought out Rockefeller Group in New York City, the real estate company that then fully owned Rockefeller Center. Since then the older section of the Center has been sold and the Rockefeller Group, still owned by Mitsubishi, owns the western corridor of the complex.

Mitsubishi Estate led the redevelopment of the Umekita area north of Osaka and Umeda Stations between 2010 and 2013, including the Grand Front Osaka complex.

Mitsubishi Estate stated in November 2014 that it had agreed to sell a 41-year-old office building in Tokyo back to Mizuho Financial Group for $1.35 billion.

In 2015, Mitsubishi announced that it would hold a majority stake in a redevelopment project north of Tokyo Station that would include the tallest building in Japan, a 390-metre (1,280 ft)-tall skyscraper. The targeted completion date for the project is 2027.

In 2019, Mitsubishi Estate became the developer of the One City Center project in Bangkok, which was completed in March 2023. This marked the Mitsubishi Estate Group's first office development project in Thailand, with a total investment of approximately 8.8 billion Thai baht (around 36.1 billion yen). Standing at about 276 meters tall, One City Center is the tallest office building in Thailand. Mitsubishi Estate collaborated on the project with Raimon Land Co. Ltd., a leading developer in Thailand.

== Investments ==
In 2019, Mitsubishi Estate announced a commitment of 10 billion yen in investments as part of their initiative to discover new business projects and to develop synergy with innovative businesses.

- Mitsubishi Estate participated in the Series D round of funding for Astroscale, a Singapore-headquartered space debris removal startup with offices in Japan and the UK. The round was led by Japan's INCJ Ltd., and included funds operated by SBI Investment Co., Ltd (SBII) and totaled US$50 million.
- In May 2019, Singapore-based proptech startup GorillaSpace announced that it had raised an undisclosed seed round of investment led by Mitsubishi Estate. This investment marked the first seed level investment for Mitsubishi Estate, as well as the first proptech startup outside of Japan to receive funding from the company.
- Mitsubishi Estate announced on 28 January 2019, that it has accepted new shares issued by Clean Planet Inc. Clean Planet (Minato-ku, Tokyo) is a venture firm that researches and develops "new hydrogen energy".

== Group companies ==
- Rockefeller Group International, Inc.
- Europa Capital
- Mitsubishi Jisho Sekkei Inc.
- Mitsubishi Real Estate Services Co., Ltd.
- Mitsubishi Estate Home Co., Ltd.
- Yokohama Royal Park Hotel Co., Ltd.
- Aqua City Co., Ltd.
- Marunouchi Heat Supply Co., Ltd.
- Yokohama Sky Building Co., Ltd.
- Royal Park Hotel Co., Ltd.
