= Europa Capital =

- Type: Private
- Industry: Real estate investment
- Headquarters: London, W1T, United Kingdom
- Website: europacapital.com

Europa Capital is a real estate investment firm headquartered in London, United Kingdom.

== History ==
Europa Capital was founded by Sir John Beckwith in 1995. By 2010, Beckwith had sold the firm to its partners, and it had over €2 billion of assets under management. It is now owned by the Rockefeller Group, a subsidiary of the Mitsubishi Estate.
