= 2000s in Japan =

The 2000s in Japan began with hope and optimism for the 21st century and ended with the late-2000s recession.

Gaming systems like the PlayStation 3, the Wii, and the Nintendo DS continued to help generate the profits of Japan-based electronic companies like Nintendo and Sony. Video games released and/or developed in Japan would see an improvement with their physics engines, their artificial intelligence, and see their graphics become high definition. Many young people would live with their parents and spend their time reading manga and watching anime due to the lack of employment for young people in Japan during this decade.

The average price of gasoline at the end of the 2000s would be $8/gallon; making it unaffordable for most Japanese people to drive long distances unless necessary.

Some examples of anime of the 2000s would include Bleach, One Piece, Kirby of the Stars, Sonic X, Tokyo Mew Mew, Ojamajo Doremi, Gurren Lagann, and Kodai Ōja Kyōryū Kingu. Most of these anime shows mentioned here would also go on to relative success in North America and Europe in the 2000s. For example, Tokyo Mew Mew became Mew Mew Power while Ojamajo Doremi became Magical Doremi.

== Social ==
=== Employment ===
While people were losing their jobs, technology still was advancing at an exponential rate - making more jobs obsolete as new technologies replaced the old. Manufacturing jobs were being replaced with service sector jobs just like they were doing in the Western countries—leading to people being underemployed in either minimum wage or near-minimum wage jobs. There was some economic recovery during this decade; but the spending on cars and whiskey had not returned to the levels that were reached during the Japanese economic boom of the 1980s. Japanese employers and companies made up for the labor shortages in the 1990s by hiring temporary workers without security or job benefits.

As of March 2010, the unemployment rate in Japan is 4.9%; a very low number compared to the unemployment rate during the height of the Lost Decade. The Lost Decade would finally come to a close in the year 2000; marking a decade of economic renewal after a gradual recession.

=== Cell phone usage ===
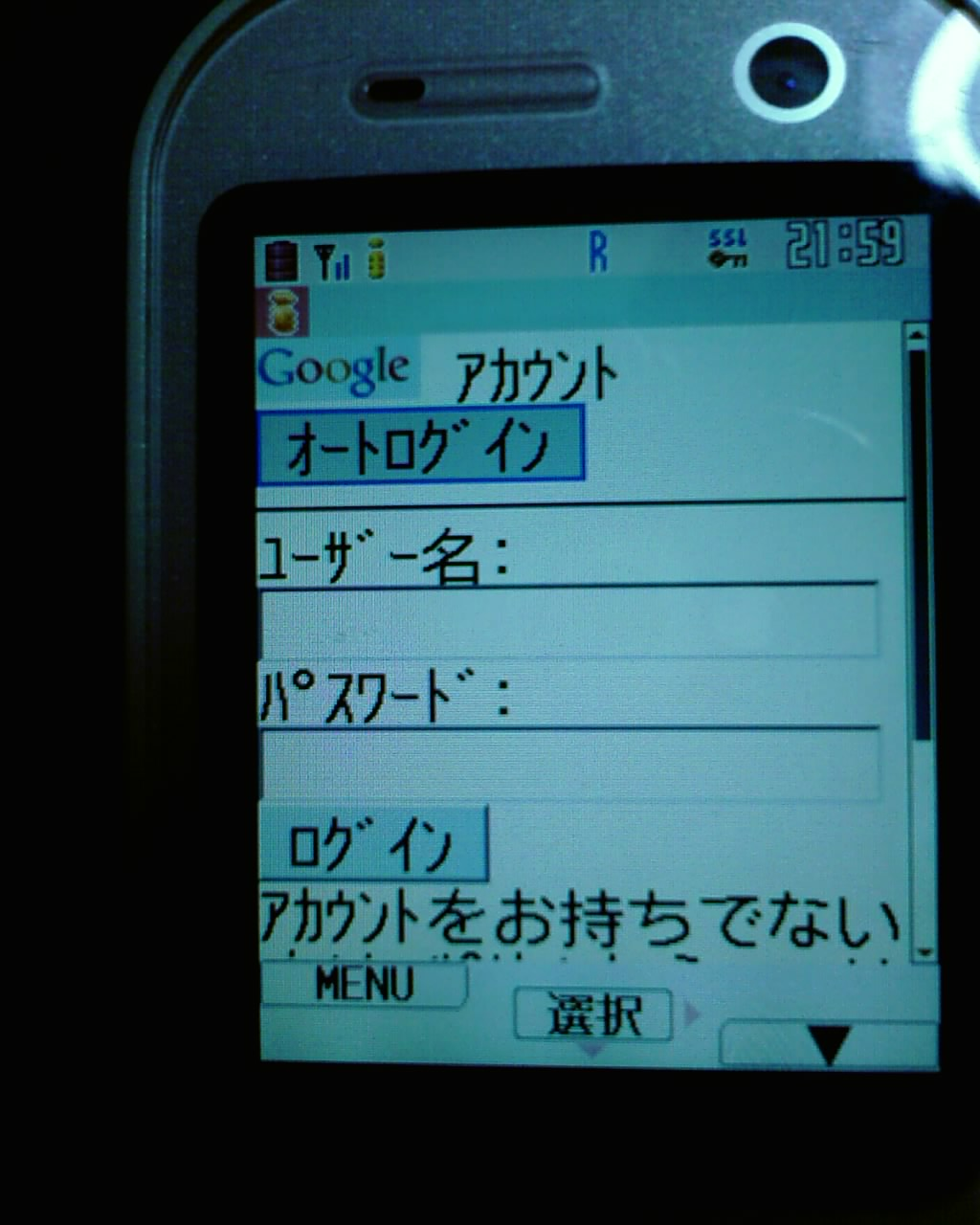
Japanese cell phone accessing Gmail in 2007

Japan had more multi-function cell phones than any other nation on earth during this decade. Handsets often doubled as televisions and subway passes. They were also used to buy sodas and beer from vending machines or conduct banking. Japanese people of this decade were more likely to send e-mails, messages and play games on their cell phones instead of using them to talk to people. Teenagers listen to music and surf the Internet for vital information. Girls often go to restrooms to send progress reports about dates to their friends.Poets and musicians write down thoughts in their cell phones and memorize them for work or home. Young kids are e-mailed by their parents or their guardians about their whereabouts. Expert cell phone users can type 100 Chinese characters per minute (the equivalent of 100 words per minute in the English language)

Young women between the ages of 10 and 19 spend almost one hundred minutes (1.65 hours) a day on a cell phone; compared to the national average of 18 minutes. People use cell phones in Japan to find apartments for rent, follow the results of each and every Sumo match, download horoscopes, and check out the most popular pop music songs on the charts. Kanji is now used less frequently thanks to cell phones; leading to a dumbing down of the Japanese language. Cell phones in Japan are arguably the world's most advanced. However, most models do not work outside Japan. Many use their cell phones to tap to into service that send messages about bargain prices. The Japanese even use their cell phones to do grocery shopping. Sales using cell phones have increased by 51.4 billion yen from 2003 to 2004.

=== Population decline ===
The 1990s were the final decade where the birth rate in Japan would exceed the death rate. Young people lacking money and living space to properly reproduce is just one of many reasons the birth rate plummeted starting in the year 2005. It has been suggested that the population of Japan will fall from over 100 million in the 1990s to a mere 95.2 million by the year 2050. However, the most recent rise in the national birth rate of Japan happened in February 2007. Japan will see a 0.9% decline of their population after the year 2025 - lowering their labor force while countries like Canada will see a rise in their labor force by that same year. More than 100000 new jobs were added in Canada by the end of April 2010 alone.

Shimojō, a village in the prefecture of Nagano, has an approximate population of 4169. This village is the only Japanese municipality in this decade to contradict the national population decline in Japan. The birthrate in the area was 2.12 (compared to the national average of 1.25) in 2005. There is a density of 110.70 people per square kilometre in Shimojō and the total area of the village is 37.66 square kilometres (9,310 acres).

== Images ==
Changes in the Population of Japan

Birth and death rates of Japan since 1950

== See also ==
- 1980s in Japan
- 1990s in Japan
- Heisei era
