= Heisei era =

Period of Japanese history (1989–2019)

Heisei 平成
- 8 January 1989 – 30 April 2019
Shōwa	Reiwa
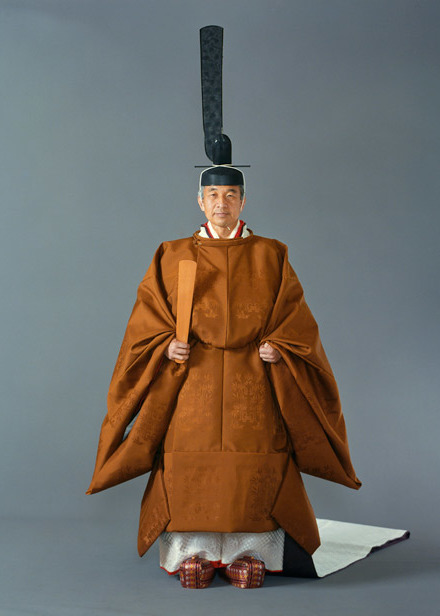
- Emperor Akihito of the Heisei era (1990)
- Location: Japan
- Including: Major events: Japanese asset price bubble; Great Hanshin earthquake; 1998 Winter Olympics; Kyoto Protocol; Battle of Amami-Ōshima; 2002 FIFA World Cup; Japanese Iraq Reconstruction and Support Group; Operation Ocean Shield; Japan Self-Defense Force Base Djibouti; Great East Japan earthquake and tsunami; Fukushima Daiichi nuclear disaster
- Monarch: Akihito
- Prime Ministers: List: Noboru Takeshita; Sōsuke Uno; Toshiki Kaifu; Kiichi Miyazawa; Morihiro Hosokawa; Tsutomu Hata; Tomiichi Murayama; Ryutaro Hashimoto; Keizō Obuchi; Yoshirō Mori; Junichiro Koizumi; Shinzo Abe; Yasuo Fukuda; Tarō Asō; Yukio Hatoyama; Naoto Kan; Yoshihiko Noda
- Key events: Japanese asset price bubble; Great Hanshin earthquake; Tokyo subway sarin attack; Kyoto Protocol; Lost Decades; Battle of Amami-Ōshima; Japanese Iraq Reconstruction and Support Group; Operation Ocean Shield; Great East Japan earthquake and tsunami; Fukushima Daiichi nuclear disaster

The Heisei era (平成; Japanese: [heːseː]) was the period of Japanese history corresponding to the reign of Emperor Akihito from 8 January 1989 until his abdication on 30 April 2019. The Heisei era started on 8 January 1989, the day after the death of the Emperor Hirohito, when his elder son, Akihito, acceded to the throne as the 125th Emperor of Japan. In accordance with Japanese customs, Hirohito was posthumously renamed "Emperor Shōwa" on 31 January 1989.

Thus, 1989 corresponds to Shōwa 64 up until 7 January and Heisei 1 (平成元年, Heisei gannen; gannen means "first year") from 8 January. The Heisei era ended on 30 April 2019 (Heisei 31), with the abdication of Akihito from the Chrysanthemum Throne. It was succeeded by the Reiwa era as then-crown prince Naruhito ascended the throne on 1 May midnight local time.

== History and meaning ==
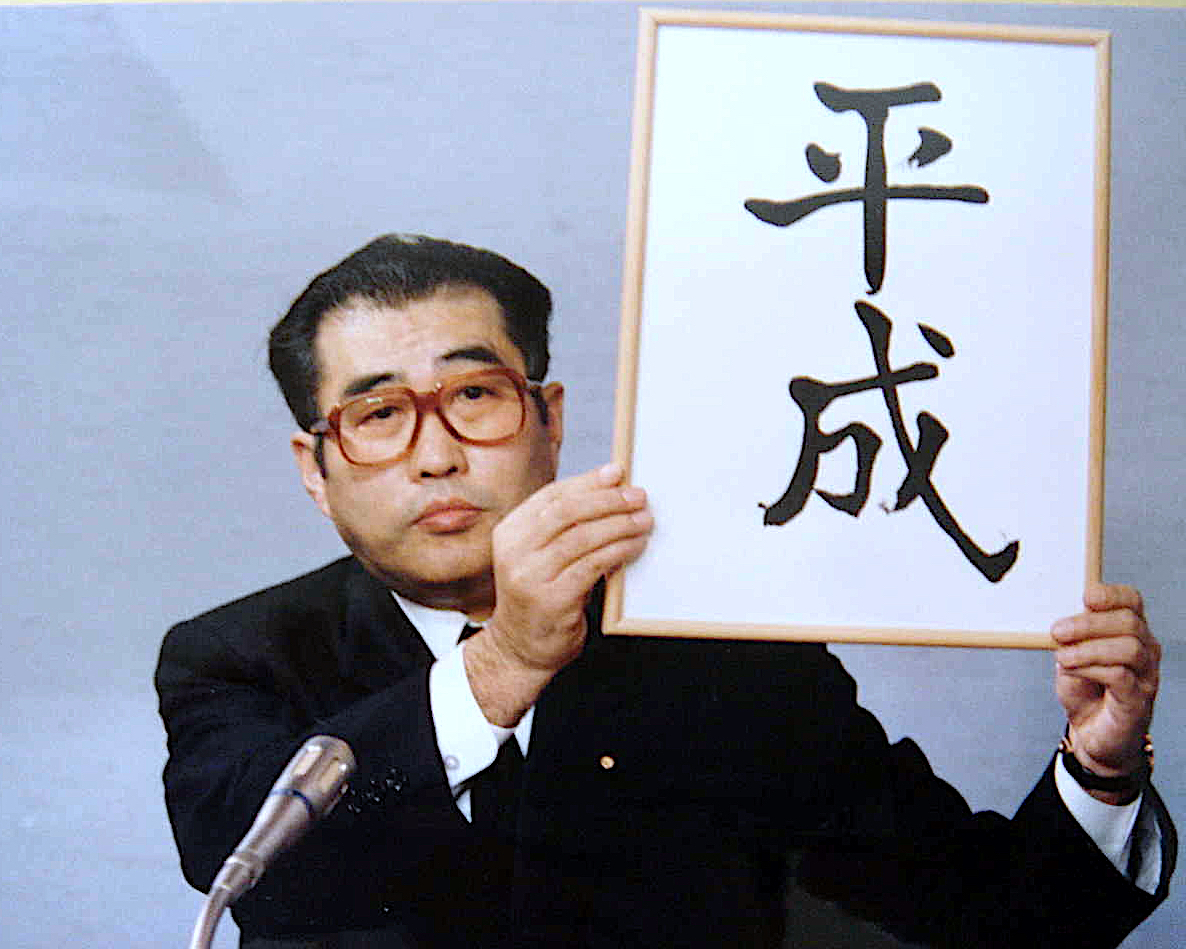
Chief Cabinet Secretary Keizō Obuchi revealing the new era name to the press (7 January 1989)

Shortly after the death of Emperor Hirohito on 7 January 1989, Keizō Obuchi, then-Chief Cabinet Secretary and later Prime Minister of Japan, hosted a press conference to announce the new era name "Heisei" for the reign of Emperor Akihito, and explained its meaning.

According to Obuchi, the name "Heisei" was taken from two Chinese history and philosophy books, namely Records of the Grand Historian (史記) and the Book of Documents (書経). In the Records of the Grand Historian, a sentence appears in a section honoring the wise rule of the legendary Chinese Emperor Shun, reading "内平外成" (Kanbun: 内平かに外成る, Uchi tairaka ni soto naru, "flat inside and outside"). In the Book of Documents, the sentence "地平天成" (Kanbun: 地平かに天成る, Chi tairaka ni ten naru, "the earth is perfect") appears. By combining both meanings, Heisei is intended to mean "peace everywhere". The Heisei era went into effect at midnight local time on 8 January 1989.

In August 2016, Emperor Akihito gave a televised address to the nation, in which he expressed concern that his age would one day stop him from fulfilling his official duties. This was an implication of his wish to retire. The Japanese Diet passed the Emperor Abdication Law in June 2017 to allow the throne to pass to Akihito's son, Naruhito. After meeting with members of the Imperial House Council, Prime Minister Shinzō Abe announced that 30 April 2019 would be the date set for Akihito's abdication. The Reiwa era corresponding to Naruhito's reign began the next day.

== Events ==
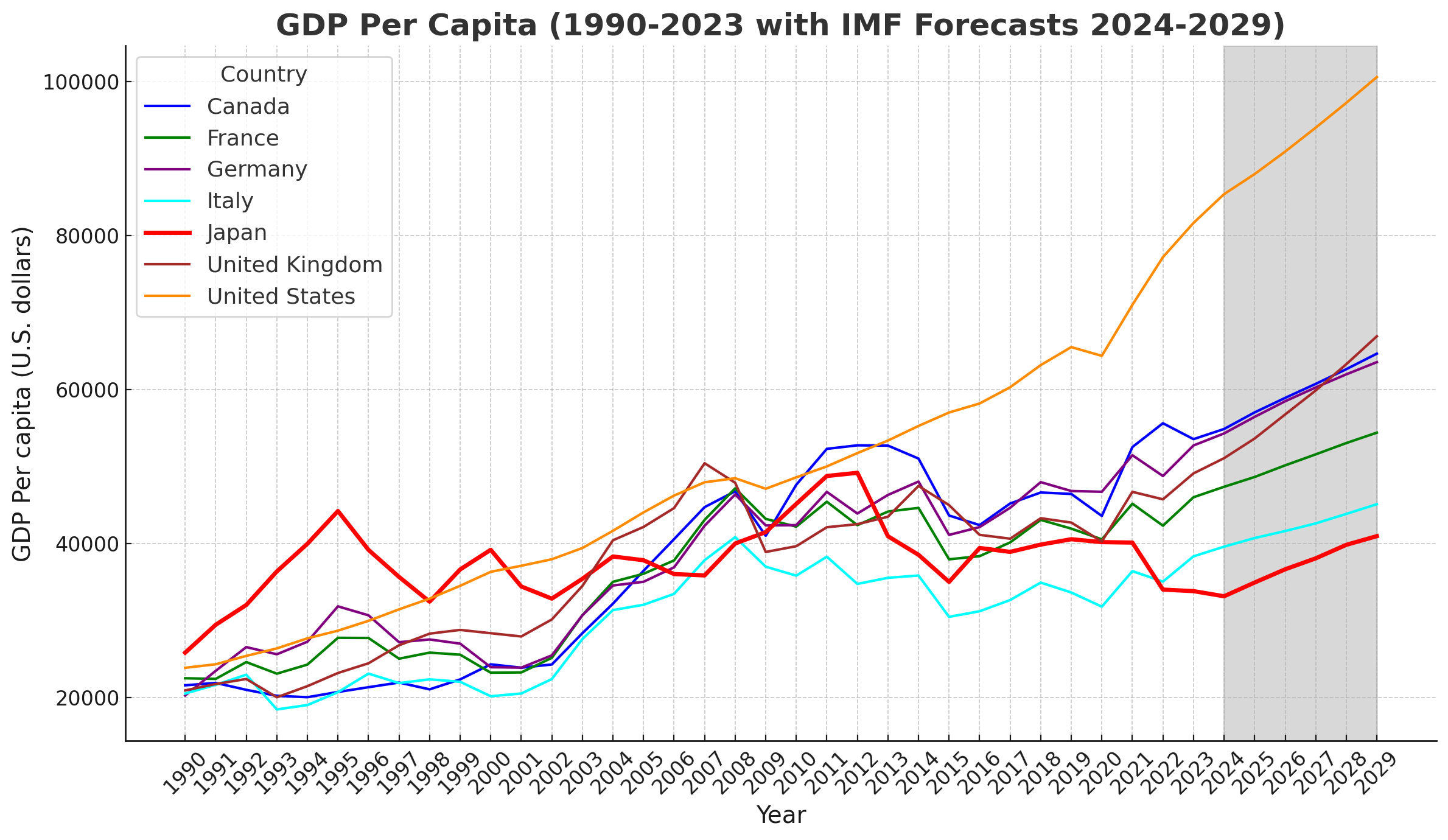
Japan's nominal GDP per capita remained stagnant around $40,000 throughout the era.

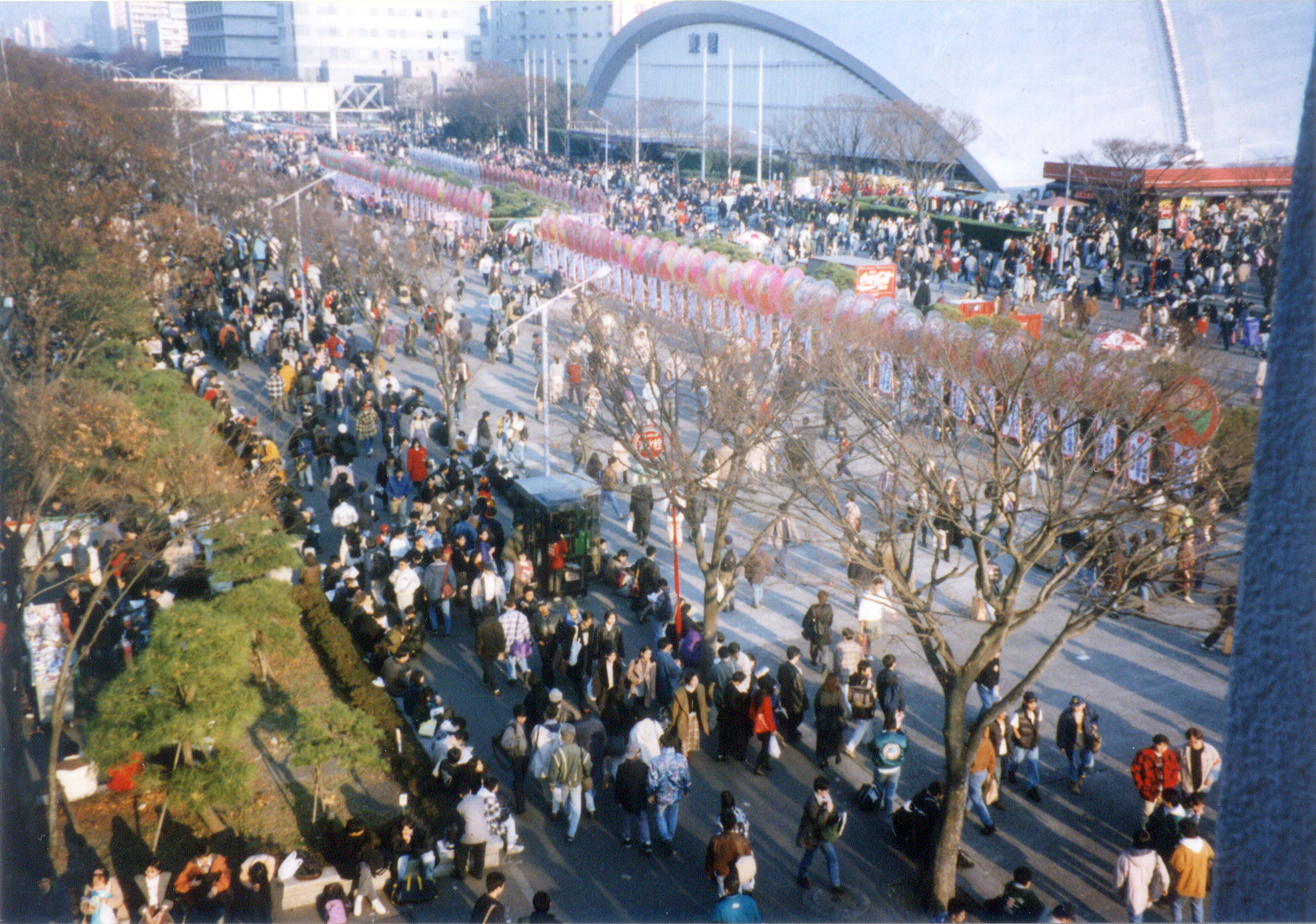
Comiket 49 doujinshi convention in 1995. The 1990s saw a boom in the international popularity of anime and manga.

1989 marked the culmination of one of the most rapid economic growth spurts in Japanese history. With a dramatically strengthened yen after the 1985 Plaza Accord, the Bank of Japan kept interest rates low, sparking an investment boom that drove Tokyo property values up 60 percent within that year. Shortly before New Year's Day, the Tokyo Stock Market index, Nikkei 225, reached its record high of 38,957. By 1992, it had fallen to 15,000, signifying the end of Japan's famed "bubble economy". Subsequently, Japan experienced the "Lost Decade", which actually consisted of more than ten years of price deflation and largely stagnant GDP as Japan's banks struggled to resolve their bad debts and companies in other sectors struggled to restructure.

The Recruit scandal of 1988 had already eroded public confidence in the Liberal Democratic Party (LDP), which had controlled the Japanese government for 38 years. In 1993, the LDP was ousted by a coalition led by Morihiro Hosokawa. However, the coalition collapsed as parties had gathered only to overthrow LDP, and lacked a unified position on almost every social issue. The LDP returned to the government in 1994, when it helped to elect Japan Socialist (later Social Democrat) Tomiichi Murayama as prime minister.

The 1990s saw an "anime boom" period marked by increased popularity of anime and anime conventions. Several Japanese media franchises gained global popularity such as Pokémon, Digimon, Sailor Moon, Saint Seiya, Gundam, Cardcaptor Sakura, Dragon Ball, Yu-Gi-Oh and Evangelion, as well as Sanrio products and the animated films of Studio Ghibli, including the Godzilla films.

In 1995, there was a large 6.8 earthquake in Kobe, Hyōgo and sarin gas terrorist attacks were carried out on the Tokyo Metro by the doomsday cult Aum Shinrikyo. Failure of the Japanese government to react to these events promptly led to the formation of non-government organisations which have been playing an increasingly important role in Japanese politics since.

On 11 December 1997, the international treaty called the Kyoto Protocol to regulate greenhouse gas emissions was adopted by 192 parties in Kyoto, Japan.

During this era, Japan reemerged as a military power. In 1991, Japan made a financial contribution of $10 billion and sent military hardware for the Gulf War. However, Article 9 of the Constitution prevented a participation in the actual war, leading Iran to criticize Japan for just pledging money and did not appreciate the way Japan co-operated in the Gulf War. However, after the war, between 26 April and October 1991 six JMSDF minesweeper vessels were sent and removed 34 sea mines in the Persian Gulf to improve the safety of ships.

Following the Iraq War, in 2003, Prime Minister Junichirō Koizumi's Cabinet approved a plan to send about 1,000 soldiers of the Japan Self-Defense Forces to help in Iraq's reconstruction, the biggest overseas troop deployment since World War II without the sanction of the UN. The mission lasted until February 2009.

The 2002 FIFA World Cup was the first FIFA World Cup to be held in Asia, the first to be held outside of the Americas or Europe, as well as the first to be jointly-hosted by more than one nation. This world championship for men's national football teams was jointly hosted by Japan and South-Korea to improve relations.

On 23 October 2004, the Heisei 16 an earthquake and aftershocks rocked the Hokuriku region in Niigata Prefecture, killing 52 and injuring hundreds.

In November 2005, The Japan Aerospace Exploration Agency (JAXA)'s robotic spacecraft Hayabusa landed on an asteroid and collected samples in the form of tiny grains of asteroidal material, which were returned to Earth aboard the spacecraft on 13 June 2010. It was the first spacecraft in history designed to deliberately land on an asteroid and then take off again. The Hayabusa mission was the first to return an asteroid sample to Earth for analysis.

After an election defeat, Prime Minister Shinzō Abe resigned suddenly, and in Autumn 2007 Yasuo Fukuda became prime minister. Fukuda in turn resigned in September 2008 citing political failings, and Tarō Asō was selected by his party.

In 2008, Greater Tokyo has the largest metropolitan economy in the world with a total GDP (nominal) of approximately $2 trillion (¥165 trillion). Greater Tokyo also has the largest metropolitan population in the world with an estimated 35 million.

In August 2009, for the first time, the Democratic Party of Japan (DPJ) won 308 seats in the lower house election, which ended 50 years of political domination by the LDP. As a result of the election, Tarō Asō resigned as leader of the LDP, and Yukio Hatoyama, president of DPJ became prime minister on 16 September 2009. However, DPJ soon became mired in party financing scandals, particularly involving aides close to Ichirō Ozawa. Naoto Kan was chosen by the DPJ as the next prime minister, but he soon lost a working majority in the House of Councillors election, and the 2010 Senkaku boat collision incident caused increased tension between Japan and China. The 2009–2010 Toyota vehicle recalls also took place during this time.

The population of Japan peaked at 128 million in 2010. This was Japan's biggest population in history. It declined due to a low birthrate in the following years.

In July 2010, The JSDF's first postwar overseas base was established in Djibouti.

In December 2010, Japan's 2010 National Defense Program Guidelines changed its defense policy from a focus on the former Soviet Union to China.

In 2011, the economy of China became the second largest in the world. Japan's economy descended to the world's third largest by nominal GDP.

In 2011, a sumo tournament was cancelled for the first time in 65 years over a match fixing scandal.

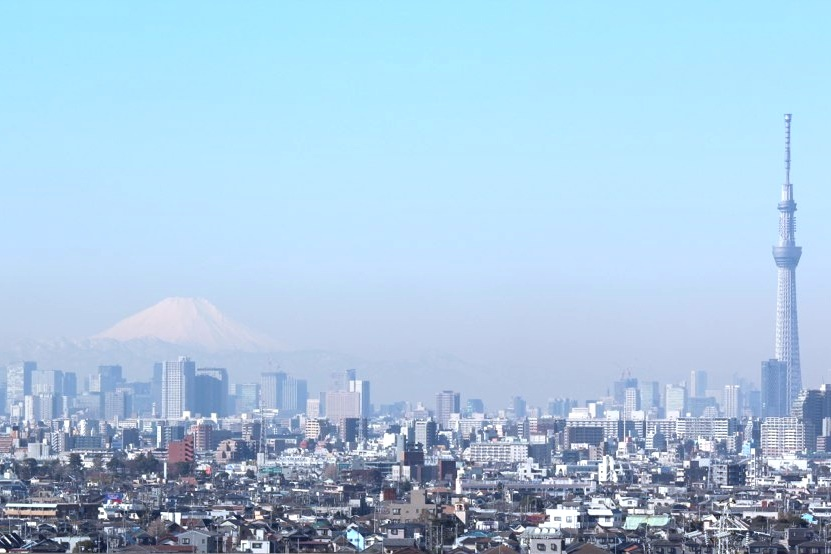
Mount Fuji and Tokyo Skytree (2012)

In March 2011, the Tokyo Skytree 634.0 metres (2,080 ft) became the tallest tower in the world. and the second tallest structure in the world after the Burj Khalifa.

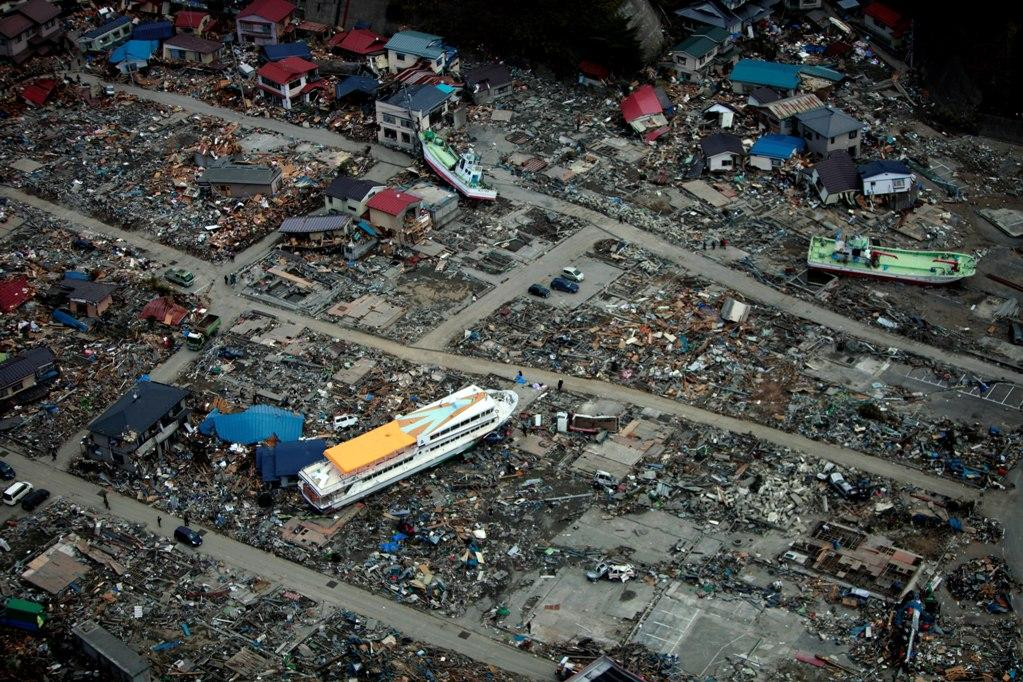
Destroyed buildings in Miyako, Iwate, following the 2011 Tōhoku tsunami

On 11 March 2011 at 2:46 p.m., Japan was hit by the Tōhoku earthquake of a magnitude scale of 9.0, the strongest recorded earthquake in its history, affecting places in the three regions of Tohoku, Chubu and Kanto in the northeast of Honshu, including the Tokyo area. A tsunami with waves of up to 10 meters (32.5 feet) flooded inland areas several kilometers from shore, causing a large number of considerable fires. The epicenter of the quake lay so close to coastal villages and towns that thousands could not flee in time despite the tsunami warning system, and also, Fukushima Daiichi Nuclear Power Plant and three other nuclear power plants, serious problems occurred with the cooling systems, ultimately leading to the most serious case of radioactive contamination since the Chernobyl disaster (see Fukushima Daiichi nuclear disaster), as well as ongoing electric power shortages. Following the earthquake, for the first time, the Emperor addressed the nation in a pre-recorded television broadcast.

In August 2011, Naoto Kan resigned, and Yoshihiko Noda became prime minister. Later that year Olympus Corporation admitted major accounting irregularities. (See Tobashi scheme.) Noda pushed for Japan to consider joining the Trans-Pacific Strategic Economic Partnership, but was defeated in an election in 2012, being replaced by Shinzo Abe.

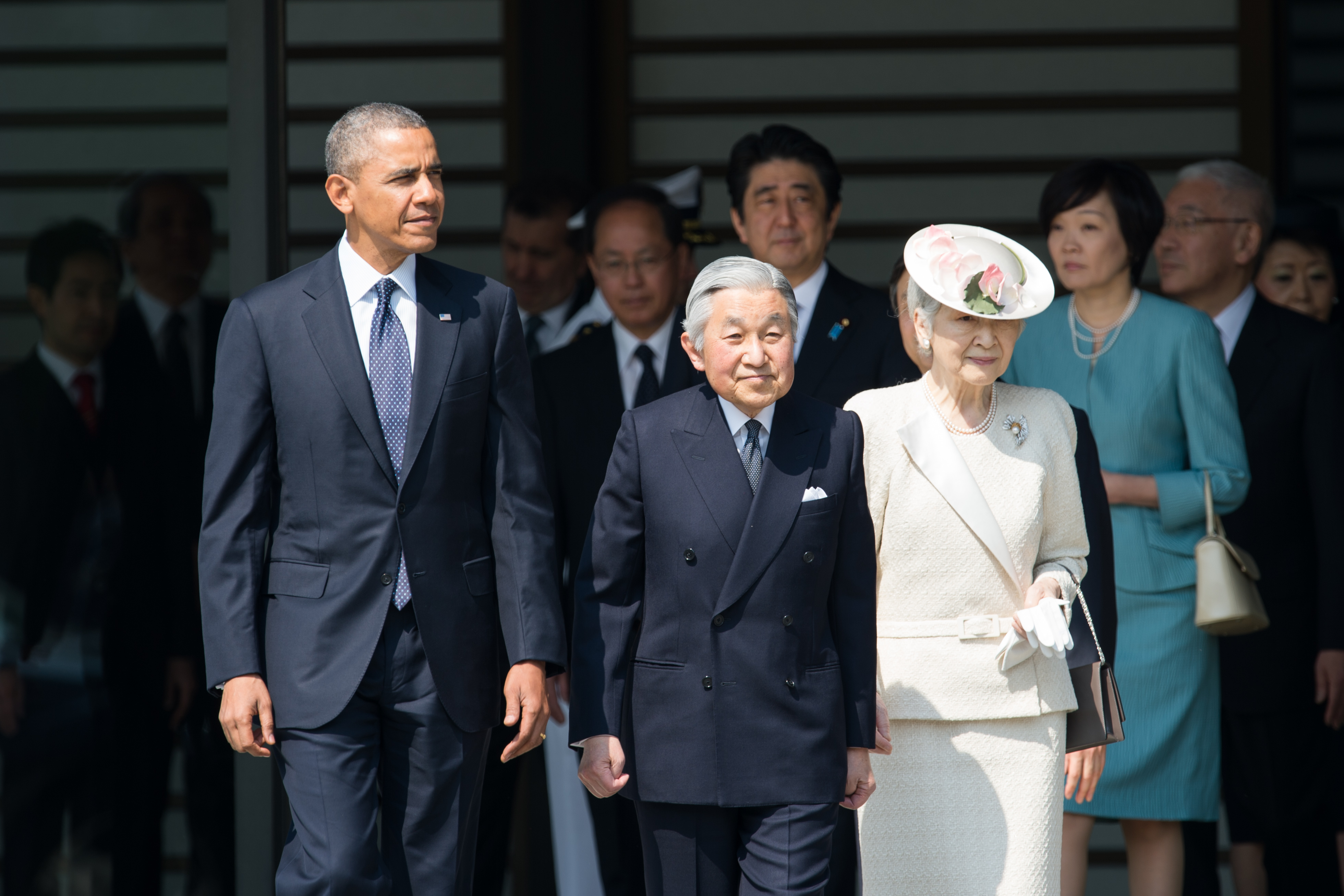
American President Barack Obama meets Emperor Akihito and Empress Michiko with Japanese Prime Minister Shinzo Abe and First Lady Akie Abe during the welcome ceremony at the Imperial Palace in Chiyoda Ward, Tokyo (April 24, 2014).

In January 2013, Shinzo Abe's government introduced economic reforms in response to the consequences of the Lost Decade and Japan's aging demographic crisis.

In the first half of 2014, The Toyota became the biggest automaker in the world selling 5.1 million vehicles in the six months ending 30 June 2014, an increase of 3.8% on the same period the previous year. Volkswagen AG recorded sales of 5.07 million vehicles.

Prime Minister Shinzo Abe sought to end deflation, but Japan entered recession again in 2014 largely due to a rise in sales tax to 8%. Abe called an election in December, and promised to delay further sales tax hikes to 2018. He won the election.

On 18 September 2015, the National Diet enacted the 2015 Japanese military legislation that allows the Japan Self-Defense Forces to collective self-defense of allies in combat for the first time under the 1947 constitution.

In October 2015, the Japan Self-Defense Forces were ranked as the world's fourth most-powerful military in conventional capabilities in a Credit Suisse report.

A United Nations report confirmed that Greater Tokyo is the most populous metropolitan area in the world with an estimated total population of 38,140,000 in 2016.

In 2018, Pokémon became the highest-grossing media franchise of all time with an estimated $90 billion revenue. Pokémon surpassed the number 2 Hello Kitty ($80 billion) and the number 5 Star Wars ($65 billion).

A record number of 31,191,929 foreign tourists visited Japan in 2018. This is a 33% increase over 2015 (19.73 million). In 2017, 3 out of 4 foreign tourists came from South Korea, China, Taiwan and Hong Kong, according to the Japan National Tourism Organization.

Japan activated the Amphibious Rapid Deployment Brigade, its first marine unit since World War II, on 7 April 2018. They are trained to counter invaders from occupying Japanese islands.

Japan was the world's largest creditor nation since 1990 and for 22 years straight. By 2018, Japan regained the leading position as the predominant source of saving and investments. Japan owned net global assets of ¥328 trillion, Germany (¥262 trillion), China (¥205 trillion).

In September 2018, Naomi Osaka became the first Japanese woman to contest a Grand Slam singles final and the first Japanese Grand Slam singles champion. Naomi Osaka was the winner of the 2018 US Open Women's Singles.

In 2018, extraordinarily heavy rainfall in Western Japan led to many deaths in Hiroshima and Okayama. Also, an earthquake struck Hokkaido, killing 41 and causing a region-wide blackout.

The first JSDF dispatch to a peacekeeping operation that was not led by the United Nations was approved in April 2019. Two JGSDF officers were despatched to monitor a cease-fire between Israel and Egypt at the Multinational Force and Observers command in the Sinai Peninsula from 19 April till 30 November 2019.

=== Nobel Prize ===
In the 30 years of the Heisei era, a total of 18 Japanese (including 3 Japanese-born naturalized foreigners) won the Nobel Prize.

- 1994 – Kenzaburo Oe, Literature
- 2000 – Hideki Shirakawa, Chemistry
- 2001 – Ryoji Noyori, Chemistry
- 2002 – Koichi Tanaka, Chemistry
- 2008 – Yoichiro Nambu, Physics
- 2008 – Makoto Kobayashi, Physics
- 2008 – Toshihide Maskawa, Physics
- 2008 – Osamu Shimomura, Chemistry
- 2010 – Eiichi Negishi, Chemistry
- 2010 – Akira Suzuki, Chemistry
- 2012 – Shinya Yamanaka, Physiology or Medicine
- 2014 – Isamu Akasaki, Physics
- 2014 – Hiroshi Amano, Physics
- 2014 – Shuji Nakamura, Physics
- 2015 – Takaaki Kajita, Physics
- 2015 – Satoshi Omura, Physiology or Medicine
- 2017 – Kazuo Ishiguro, Literature
- 2018 – Tasuku Honjo, Physiology or Medicine

== Economy ==
The country's economy suffered from prolonged stagnation, and both real wages and price levels experienced a decline during the period. According to IMF estimates, the country's GDP per capita was $39,953, the third highest in the world, in 1994. In 2019, the last year of the Heisei era, it was $40,548, which ranked 27th.

Top 10 by market capitalization

Rank	First year of Heisei (1989)	Last year of Heisei (2019)
1	(Japan) NTT; US$163.8 billion	(United States) Microsoft; US$940.8 billion
2	Industrial Bank of Japan; US$71.5 billion	(United States) Apple Inc. US$895.6 billion
3	(Japan) The Sumitomo Bank; US$69.5 billion	(United States) Amazon.com; US$874.7 billion
4	(Japan) Fuji Bank; US$67.0 billion	(United States) Alphabet Inc. US$818.1 billion
5	(Japan) Dai-Ichi Kangyo Bank; US$66.0 billion	(United States) Berkshire Hathaway; US$493.7 billion
6	(United States) IBM; US$64.6 billion	(United States) Facebook; US$475.7 billion
7	(Japan) Mitsubishi Bank; US$59.2 billion	(China) Alibaba Group; US$472.9 billion
8	(United States) Exxon; US$54.9 billion	(China) Tencent; US$440.9 billion
9	(Japan) Tokyo Electric Power Company; US$54.4 billion	(United States) Johnson & Johnson; US$372.2 billion
10	(Netherlands) (United Kingdom) Royal Dutch Shell; US$54.3 billion	(United States) ExxonMobil; US$342.1 billion

== Conversion table ==
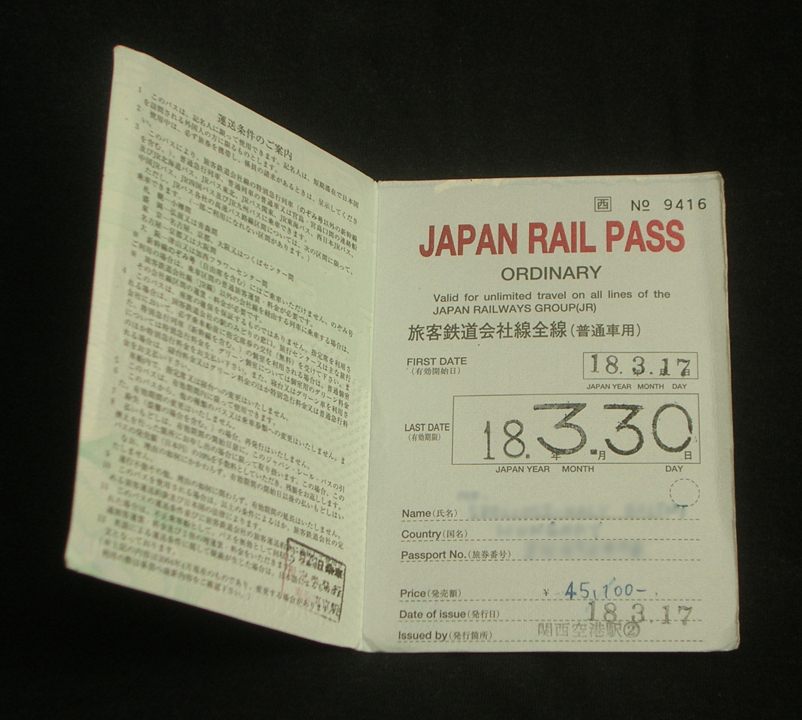
A rail pass valid during the year Heisei 18 (2006 in the Gregorian calendar)

To convert any Gregorian calendar year between 1989 and 2019 to Japanese calendar year in Heisei era, 1988 needs to be subtracted from the year in question.

Heisei	1	2	3	4	5	6	7	8
Heisei	I	II	III	IV	V	VI	VII	VIII
AD	1989	1990	1991	1992	1993	1994	1995	1996
AD	MCMLXXXIX	MCMXC	MCMXCI	MCMXCII	MCMXCIII	MCMXCIV	MCMXCV	MCMXCVI
Heisei	9	10	11	12	13	14	15	16
Heisei	IX	X	XI	XII	XIII	XIV	XV	XVI
AD	1997	1998	1999	2000	2001	2002	2003	2004
AD	MCMXCVII	MCMXCVIII	MCMXCIX	MM	MMI	MMII	MMIII	MMIV
Heisei	17	18	19	20	21	22	23	24
Heisei	XVII	XVIII	XIX	XX	XXI	XXII	XXIII	XXIV
AD	2005	2006	2007	2008	2009	2010	2011	2012
AD	MMV	MMVI	MMVII	MMVIII	MMIX	MMX	MMXI	MMXII
Heisei	25	26	27	28	29	30	31	
Heisei	XXV	XXVI	XXVII	XXVIII	XXIX	XXX	XXXI	
AD	2013	2014	2015	2016	2017	2018	2019	
AD	MMXIII	MMXIV	MMXV	MMXVI	MMXVII	MMXVIII	MMXIX	

== See also ==
- 1989 in Japan
- 1990s in Japan
- 2000s in Japan
- 2010 in Japan
- 2011 in Japan
- 2012 in Japan
- 2013 in Japan
- 2014 in Japan
- 2015 in Japan
- 2016 in Japan
- 2017 in Japan
- 2018 in Japan
- 2019 in Japan
- Heisei retro

Preceded by Shōwa (昭和)	Era of Japan; Heisei (平成); 8 January 1989 – 30 April 2019	Succeeded by Reiwa (令和)
