= Raimon Land =

Thai real estate company

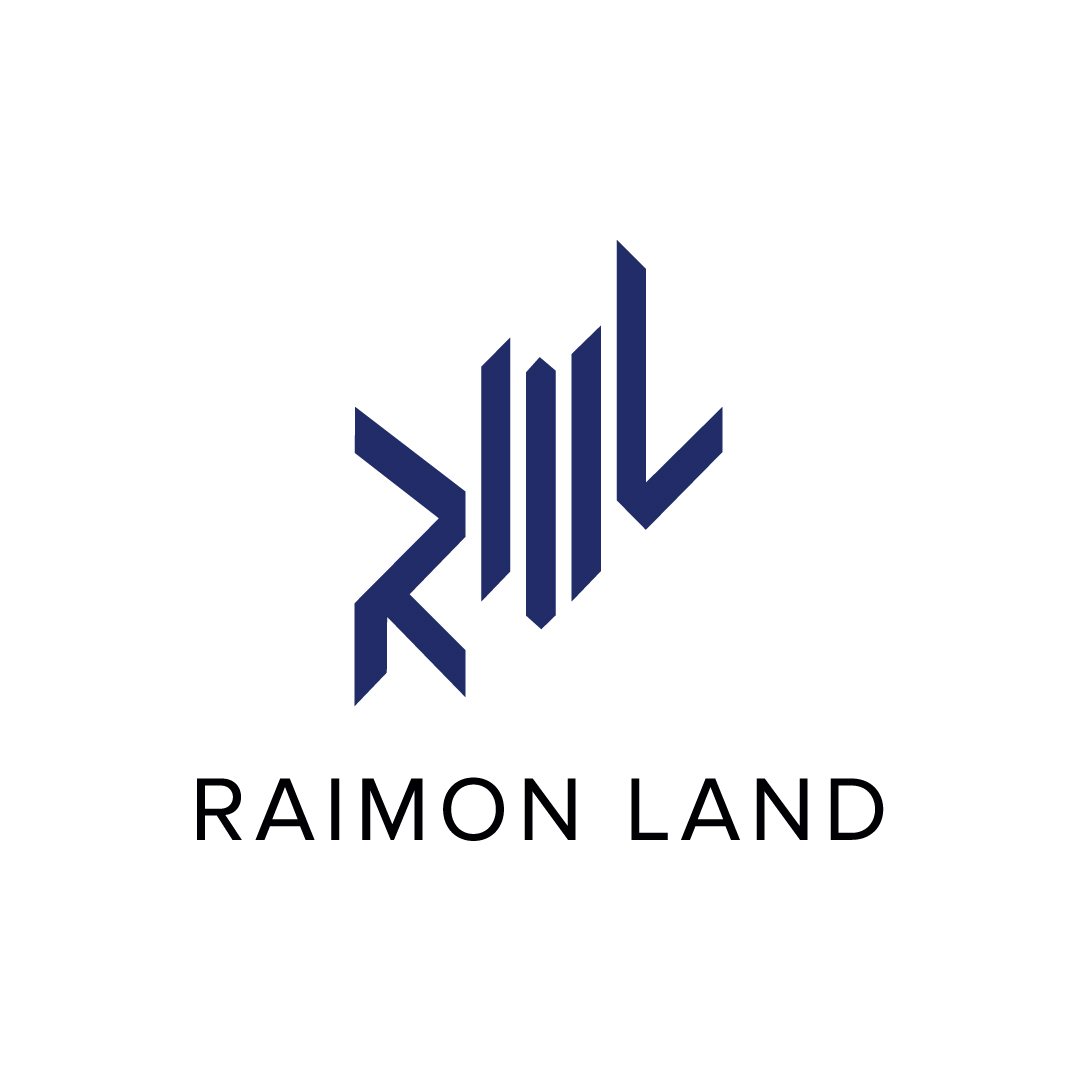
- Traded as: SET: RML
- ISIN: TH0364010Y01
- Industry: Real estate development
- Founded: September 14, 1987
- Headquarters: Bangkok, Thailand
- Website: Official website

Raimon Land (/ˈraɪmɒn/; Thai: ไรมอน แลนด์) is a Thai real estate development company. It mostly works on condominium buildings in Bangkok, Pattaya, and Phuket. Raimon Land has to date developed more than 20 residential properties in Thailand.

== History ==
Raimon Land was founded in year 1987. Raimon Land Public Company Limited has successfully established its position as the country’s leader in high-end real estate development, delivering residential, commercial, hospitality and retail properties. On 10 September 1993, the company was listed on the Stock Exchange of Thailand (SET) under "RAIMON" and, since May 2012, as “RML”. Currently, Mr.Korn Narongdej is acting a Chief Executive Officer (CEO)

Buildings that the company has worked on include:

- 2014: 185 Rajadamri, Bangkok
- 2015: Unixx, South Pattaya
- 2015: Mews Yen Akat, Bangkok
- 2016: The Lofts Ekkamai, Bangkok is scheduled for completion in 2016
- 2023: One City Centre (OCC)
