= Raimon Arola =

Spanish art historian

Raimon Arola Ferrer (born 1956, in Tarragona), Doctor of Art History and professor at the University of Barcelona, is one of the leading specialists in sacred symbolism, art and Hermetic tradition. He has given numerous seminars in different universities and has collaborated in the journal La Puerta. He is currently the director of Arsgravis and participates in the research group Aula Música Poètica. All of his many publications have international recognition.

== Publications ==
- (2012) La cábala y la alquimia en la tradición espiritual de Occidente (siglos XV-XVII). Palma de Mallorca: José J. de Olañeta. ISBN 84-9716-178-5
- (2011) El símbolo en la espiritualidad contemporánea.
- (2008) Alquimia y religión. Los símbolos herméticos del siglo XVII. Barcelona: Siruela. ISBN 978-84-9841-178-2
- (2006) Raimon Arola (ed.). Creer lo increíble. Lo antiguo y lo nuevo en la historia de las religiones. Tarragona: Arolas editors. ISBN 84-96639-06-1
- (2003) El buscador del orden. Tarragona: Arola editors. ISBN 84-95985-29-2.
- (1999) Los amores de los dioses. Mitología y alquimia. Barcelona: Altafulla. ISBN 84-7900-105-4
- (1997) El tarot de Mantegna. Barcelona: Altafulla. ISBN 84-7900-078-3
- (1995) Las estatuas vivas. Ensayo sobre arte y simbolismo. Barcelona: Obelisco. ISBN 84-7720-447-0
- (1990) Textos y glosas sobre el arte sagrado. Barcelona: Obelisco. ISBN 84-7720-149-8
- (1986) Simbolismo del templo. Barcelona: Obelisco. ISBN 84-7720-682-1
- (1985) L'arbre, l'home i el tremp. Barcelona: Obelisco.
