= 1990s in Japan =

The 1990s in Japan was the beginning of economic turmoil and recession for that particular nation, resulting in their Lost Decade. While the Lost Decade would finally end in 2000 for Japan, this would become the era where young Japanese salarymen were forced to find different lines of work.

== Technology ==
=== General trends ===
Japanese vehicles began to exceed North American standards in terms of fuel efficiency, as advancements in technology allowed them to achieve higher miles per gallon compared to their North American counterparts. As the cost of gasoline surged, individuals in Japan and other oil-reliant countries increasingly relied on high-speed rail networks and other forms of mass transit, such as buses. The average price of gasoline at the end of the next decade would rise to $8/gallon on a national level; making it unaffordable for most of the Japanese people to drive long distances. After the 1990s ended and the 21st century began, Japanese residents (in addition to other people) will experience a return to local produce (through local farmers' markets instead of expensive grocery stores), increased use of renewable energy like wind energy and solar energy, the exodus from the exurbs to urban centers, more electric car sales, and a major shakeup of the airline industry.

=== Video games ===
While new gaming consoles like the Super Famicom and the Sony PlayStation flooded the market, most young people began to move in with their parents, and read manga. This was due to the fact that individuals were unable to secure employment that would allow them to maintain their accustomed standard of living and desired amenities. During this period, numerous video games were released, particularly for the Super Famicom. Popular American titles like SimCity and SimEarth gained popularity for Japanese video gamers. The 1990s was also the era for Chrono Trigger, Final Fantasy IV, Final Fantasy VI, and Final Fantasy VII. These games became multimillion-dollar blockbusters in Japan, Europe, and North America. However, the Famicom went into decline and most game companies halved their production of new 8-bit games by 1994.

Even the Nintendo Game Boy acquired popularity in Japan (spawning a lineup of Japan-exclusive video games) and eventually the Japanese release of the Nintendo Game Boy Advance. Nintendo Power wrote an exposé about Japanese video games (using one of its first 50 issues). The exposé stated that Japanese video games were less censored than their North American counterparts. Video games that were released in Japan employed some form of sexual content, brought forth the invocation of religious symbols, utilized a level of violence never seen in North American games (until the release of Doom in the mid-1990s), and mentioning tobacco in addition to alcohol so that the story could have more flavor. Some of these Japanese games, which were uncensored, even included the use of vulgar language.

The Sega CD (known as the Sega Mega CD in Japan) was one of the first platforms to offer full motion video beyond the personal computer market. It became trendy in the 1990s (and in the 2000s) for players to create their own role-playing video games. Game creation software like RPG Tsukūru: Super Dante and RPG Tsukūru 2 made it possible for players to create role-playing games on their Super Famicom systems. Although these games did not feature the same level of graphical detail as titles such as Chrono Trigger or Final Fantasy VI, which were dominant in the RPG genre during the 1990s, they provided players with "game creation tools" that enabled them to become game designers in the 2000s and beyond. Sequels like RPG Maker 2000 and RPG Maker XP provided that the original two software in the series were highly successful.

== Entertainment ==
=== Sports ===
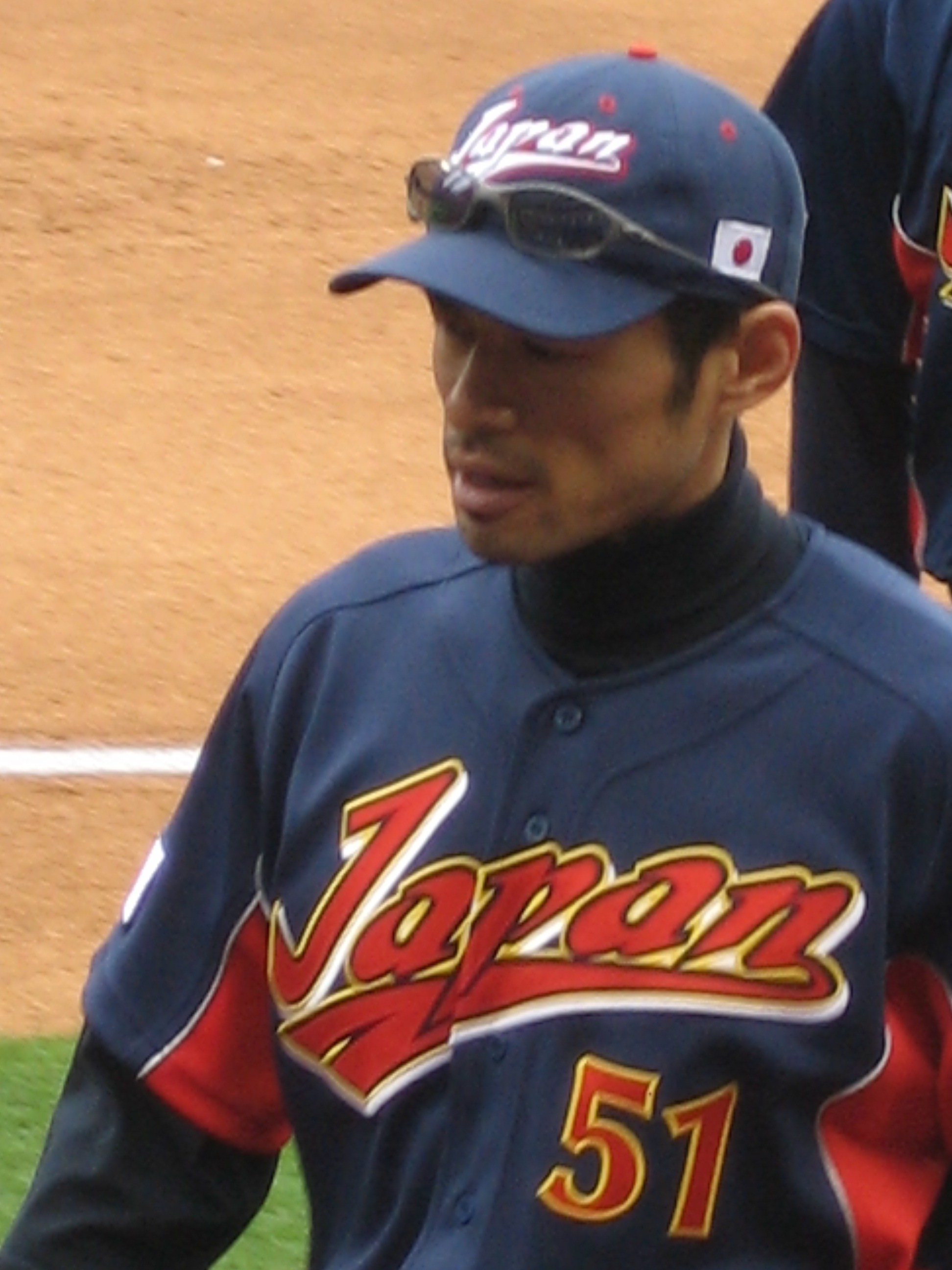
Ichiro Suzuki

Professional wrestling continued to decline well into the 1990s like it did in the 1980s.

Races often took place at either Suzuka Circuit or at Fuji Speedway. A NASCAR exhibition race was held in Motegi, Japan during the late 1990s in the hopes of getting people interested in stock car racing.

During the 1990s, it became increasingly rare for Japanese businessmen to be able to play golf alongside their employers. Golf courses began closing up by the bundles and many young men (who would otherwise enter the workforce under a more ideal economy) began only to have golf experience from their years as a student. Besides the sporting aspect, golf was used in Japan in order to adapt to corporate culture.

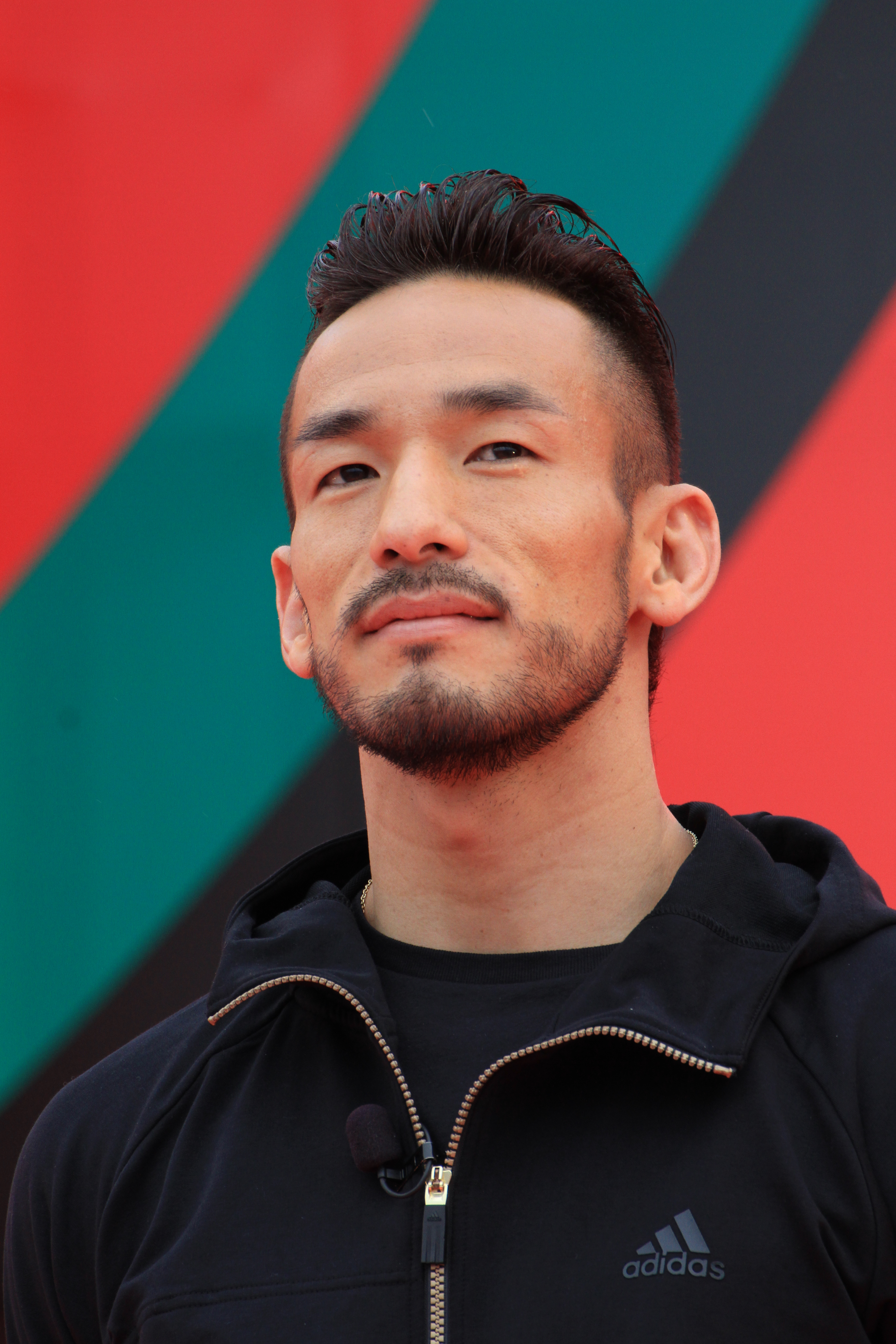
Hidetoshi Nakata

The 1990s was also the decade that the American film Mr. Baseball was released; introducing an American audience to Japanese baseball. The Chunichi Dragons and the Yomiuri Giants became popular teams after the Mr. Baseball movie made mention of them. Nippon Professional Baseball was one of the sports to watch in Japan in addition to Formula One (featuring Japan's Satoru Nakajima who retired early in the 1990s but gained respect worldwide). The only perfect game of the 1990s for the Nippon Professional Baseball league came on May 18, 1994, with the Yomiuri Giants shutting out the Hiroshima Toyo Carp by a score of 6–0.

=== Television and movies ===
Anime like Dragon Ball Z (shōnen) and Pokémon (shōnen) developed an international audience after being created in Japan. Girl-oriented (shōjo) anime like Sailor Moon also became of age during the 1990s. This show would be the inspiration for the 2000s anime Tokyo Mew Mew (known in North America as Mew Mew Power). J-Pop continued to be popular among Japanese female teenagers.

== Social ==
Birth and death rates of Japan since 1950. The drop in 1966 was due to it being a "hinoe uma" year which is viewed as a bad omen by the Japanese Zodiac.

Changes in the population of Japan

=== Employment ===
While people were losing their jobs, technology still was advancing at an exponential rate—making more jobs obsolete as new technologies replaced the old. Manufacturing jobs were being replaced with service sector jobs just like they were doing in the Western countries—leading to people being underemployed in either minimum wage or near-minimum wage jobs. There was some economic recovery after this decade, but the spending on cars and whiskey had not returned to the levels that were reached during the Japanese economic boom of the 1980s. Japan made up for the labor shortages in the 1990s by hiring temporary workers without security or job benefits.

As of March 2010, the unemployment rate in Japan was 4.9%; a very low number compared to the unemployment rate during the height of the Lost Decade.

=== Population decline ===
The 1990s would be the final decade where the birth rate in Japan would exceed the death rate, despite attempts by government agencies to encourage procreation through advertising and media campaigns throughout the decade.

=== Terrorism ===
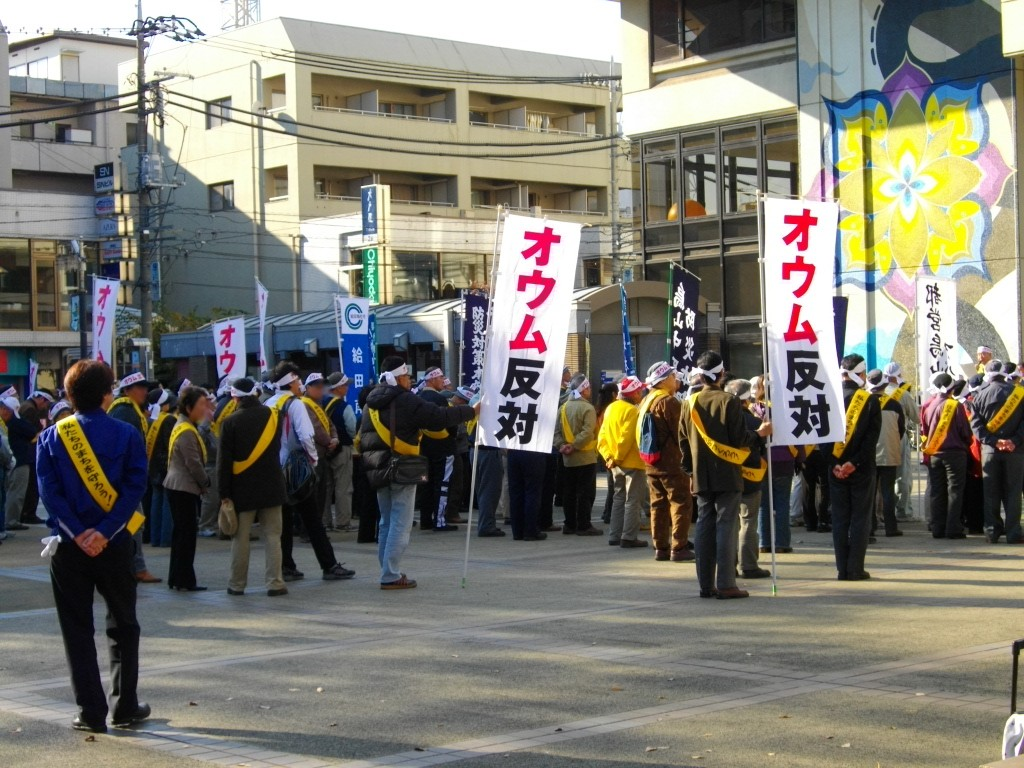
Anti-Aum Shinrikyo protest in Japan

The Tokyo subway sarin attack, usually referred to in the Japanese media as the Subway Sarin Incident (地下鉄サリン事件 Chikatetsu Sarin Jiken?), was an act of domestic terrorism perpetrated on March 20, 1995, in Tokyo, Japan by members of the Aum Shinrikyo cult.

In five coordinated attacks, the perpetrators released sarin on several lines of the Tokyo subway, killing 13 people, severely injuring 50 and causing temporary vision problems for nearly 1,000 others. The attack was directed against trains passing through Kasumigaseki and Nagatachō, home to the Japanese government. It was the most serious attack to occur in Japan since the end of World War II.

=== The Great Hanshin Earthquake ===
The Great Hanshin Earthquake, which occurred on January 17, 1995, in the southern part of Hyōgo Prefecture, Japan, was a devastating event. It measured 6.9 on the moment magnitude scale and had a maximum intensity of 7 on the JMA Seismic Intensity Scale. The earthquake resulted in approximately 6,434 deaths, with Kobe being the most severely affected city.

The quake was an "inland shallow earthquake" caused by the movement along active faults, notably the Nojima Fault on Awaji and the Suma and Suwayama faults in Kobe. It lasted for 20 seconds, causing significant damage, including destroying nearly 400,000 buildings, elevated road and rail bridges, and port quays. Approximately 300 fires were triggered, and water, electricity, and gas supply disruptions were widespread.

The majority of the casualties occurred in Hyōgo Prefecture, with over 4,000 deaths. Structural damage was severe, with one in five buildings becoming uninhabitable in the worst-hit areas. The earthquake also profoundly impacted transportation infrastructure, with elevated expressways and railways sustaining substantial damage.

The earthquake prompted a reassessment of building codes and construction practices. Despite initial beliefs that collapsed structures were negligently constructed, it was later revealed that many complied with the building codes of the 1960s, which were later found to be inadequate. The damage highlighted the vulnerability of certain construction methods, particularly those predating the 1981 building code revision.

The earthquake caused subsidence in artificial islands, such as Rokkō Island and Port Island in Kobe, due to liquefaction. Notably, the Akashi Kaikyō Bridge, under construction near the epicenter, was undamaged but experienced horizontal displacement.

In the aftermath, there were extensive efforts to repair and rebuild infrastructure, with the Kobe Municipal Subway resuming operations a day after the earthquake. The earthquake had a lasting impact on seismic regulations and disaster preparedness in Japan.

== See also ==
- 2000s in Japan
