= Gyoko-dori Underground Gallery =

Art gallery in Tokyo, Japan

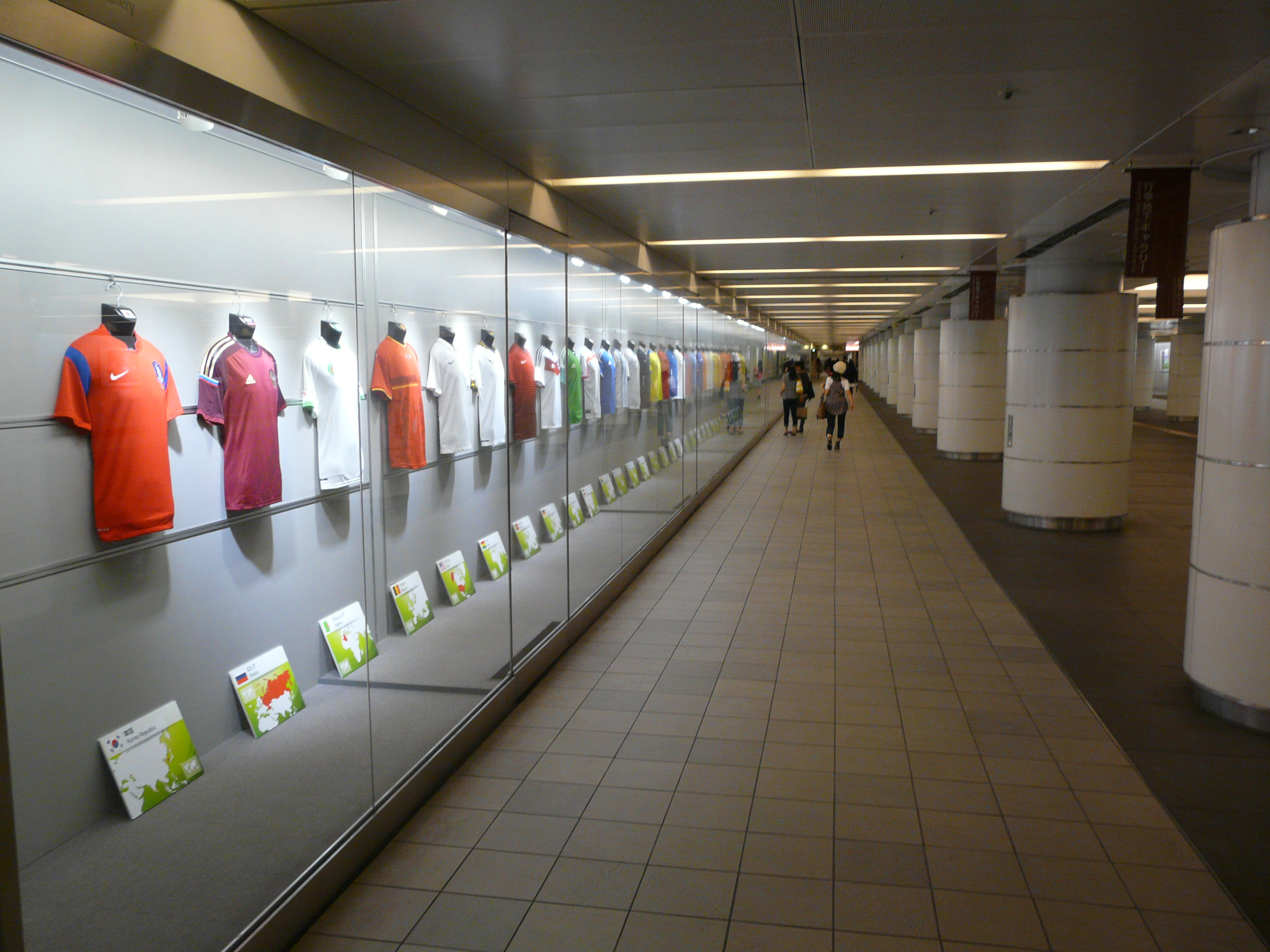
Gyoko-dori in Chiyoda City, Japan

Gyoko-dori Underground Gallery is an underground passageway and exhibition space in Marunouchi, Tokyo, Japan.

The passageway links Tokyo Station with the Marunouchi Building, Shin-Marunouchi Building and Nijūbashimae Station.

In addition, the space is also used as a gallery to exhibit paintings and photography.
