= Pacific Century Place =

Pacific Century Place may refer to:

- Pacific Century Place Jakarta, a 211m tall skyscraper in Jakarta, Indonesia
- Pacific Century Place Marunouchi, a 149.8m tall skyscraper in Tokyo, Japan
