= Zeria Pharmaceutical =

Japanese company (e. 1955)

Zeria Shinyaku Kōgyō KK (ゼリア新薬工業株式会社, Zeria Shinyaku Kōgyō Kabushiki-gaisha, Zeria Pharmaceutical Co., Ltd.) is a Japanese drug manufacturer that obtained Tillotts Pharma AG.

In 1955, the Japanese Kisaku Ibu, former Yamanouchi Seiyaku executive opened a new pharmaceutical company in Tokyo under the name Zeria Yakushō Kenkyusho (Zeria Pharmaceutical and Cosmetics Laboratory). In 1970, this company becomes Zeria Shinyaku Zeria Shinyaku KK.

In 1975, it built a new factory in Kumagaya in Saitama prefecture, before the main factory in Tsukuba which was constructed by Takenaka Corporation in 1988.

In 2009, the company obtained Switzerland company Tillotts Pharma AG, and began operating internationally through a large network of subsidiaries,

It manufactures and sells pharmaceuticals in Sweden, Ireland, UK, Czech Republic, Spain, Germany, France, Italy, Vietnam and Denmark. The drug itself is developed in Switzerland, Tillotts Parma.

The company owns a 6.63% share of Asuka Seiyaku, also a pharmaceutical company, other than its subsidiaries.

The main shareholder of the company is the company itself, the present president Mitsuhiro Ibu, Mitsubishi UFJ Financial Group, Custody Bank of Japan, Morinaga Milk Industry, SMBC, Mizuho Bank, Risona Bank, Aioi Nissay Dowa Insurance as of March 2023.

== Products ==
Zeria holds a leading position within the gastroenterology field in Japan.

In 2019, the pain reliever cream EPATEC (ketoprofen) firstly developed by Nissan Chemical Corporation was revocated authorization of Ministry of Health, Labour and Welfare around the contraindications for women in the third trimester of pregnancy.

At a facility located in Esbjerg, Denmark the subsidiary ZPD, Zeria Pharmaceuticals Denmark, (formerly Biofac) manufactures Chondroitin Sulfate Sodium. In November 2024 a considerable expansion of the facility was announced.
