= Marunouchi =

Financial district of Tokyo, Japan

Marunouchi 丸の内
- Central business district
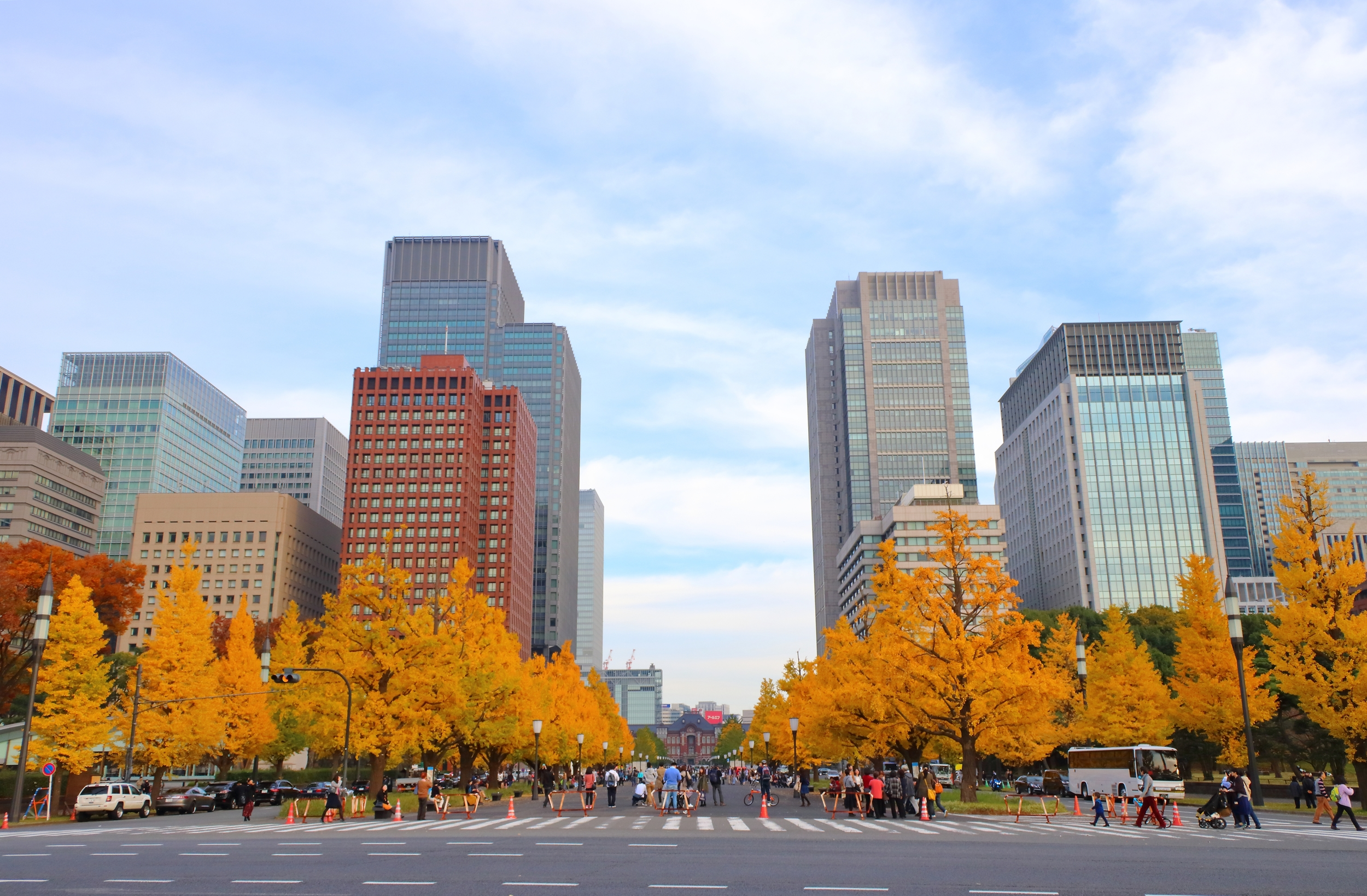
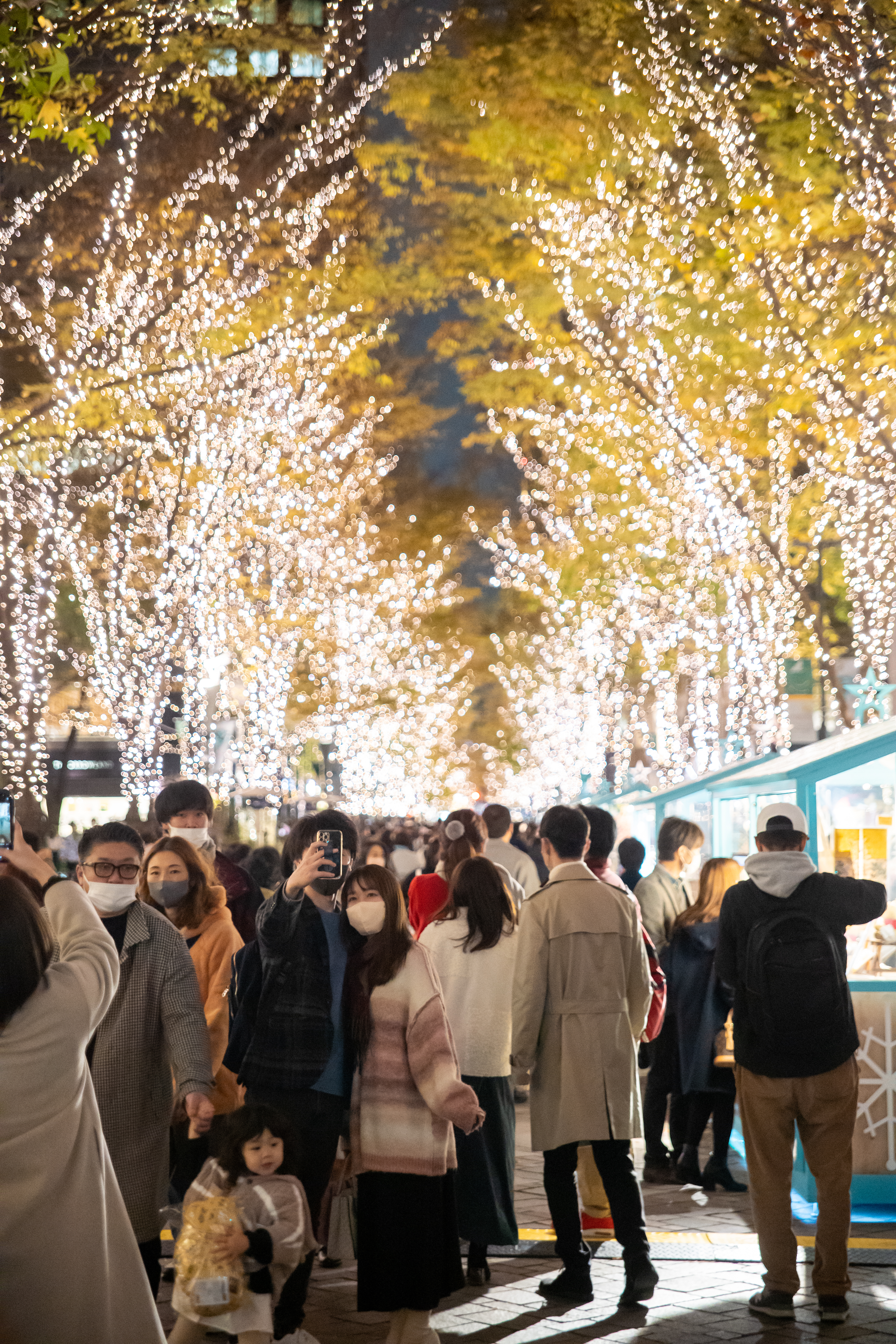
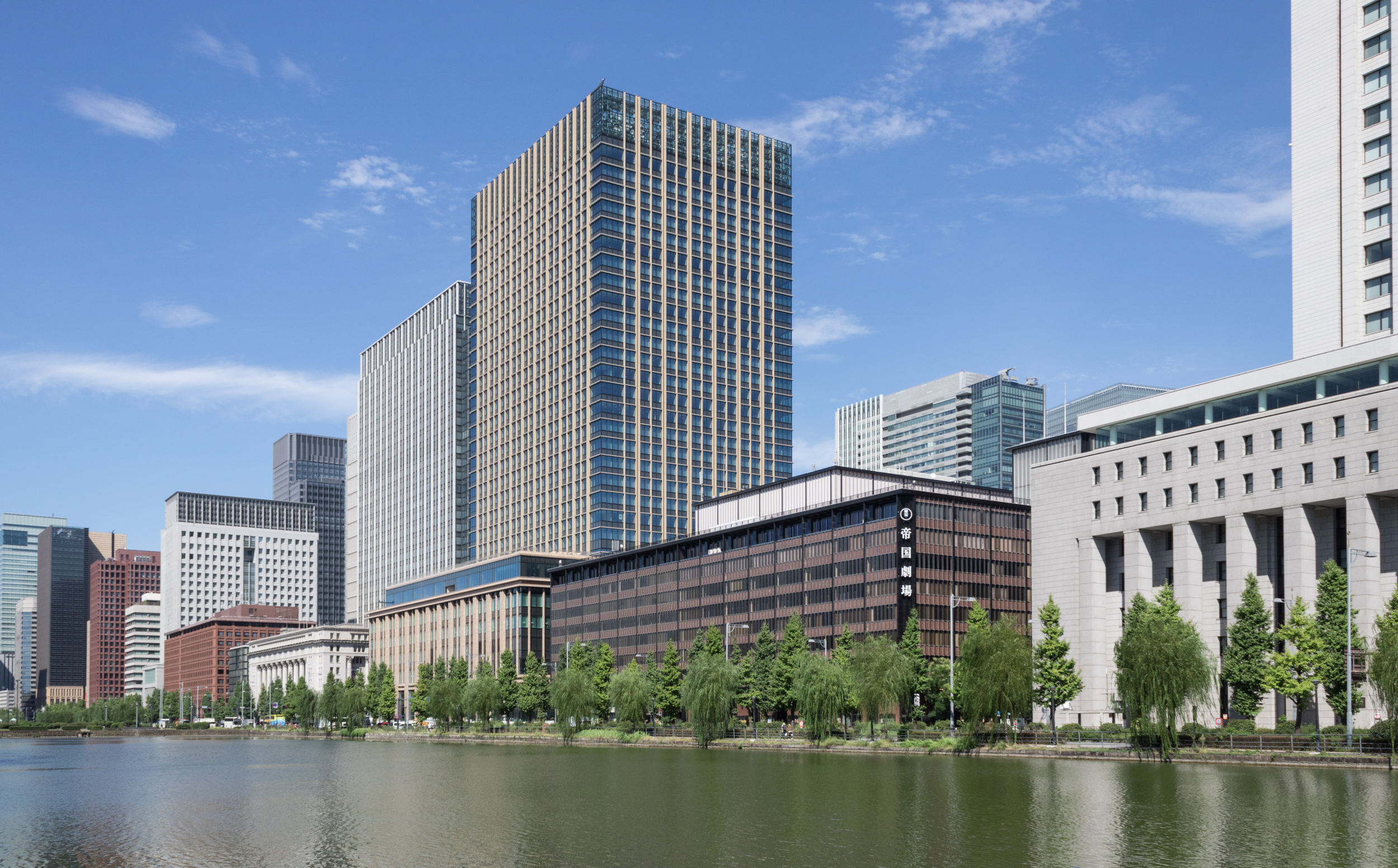
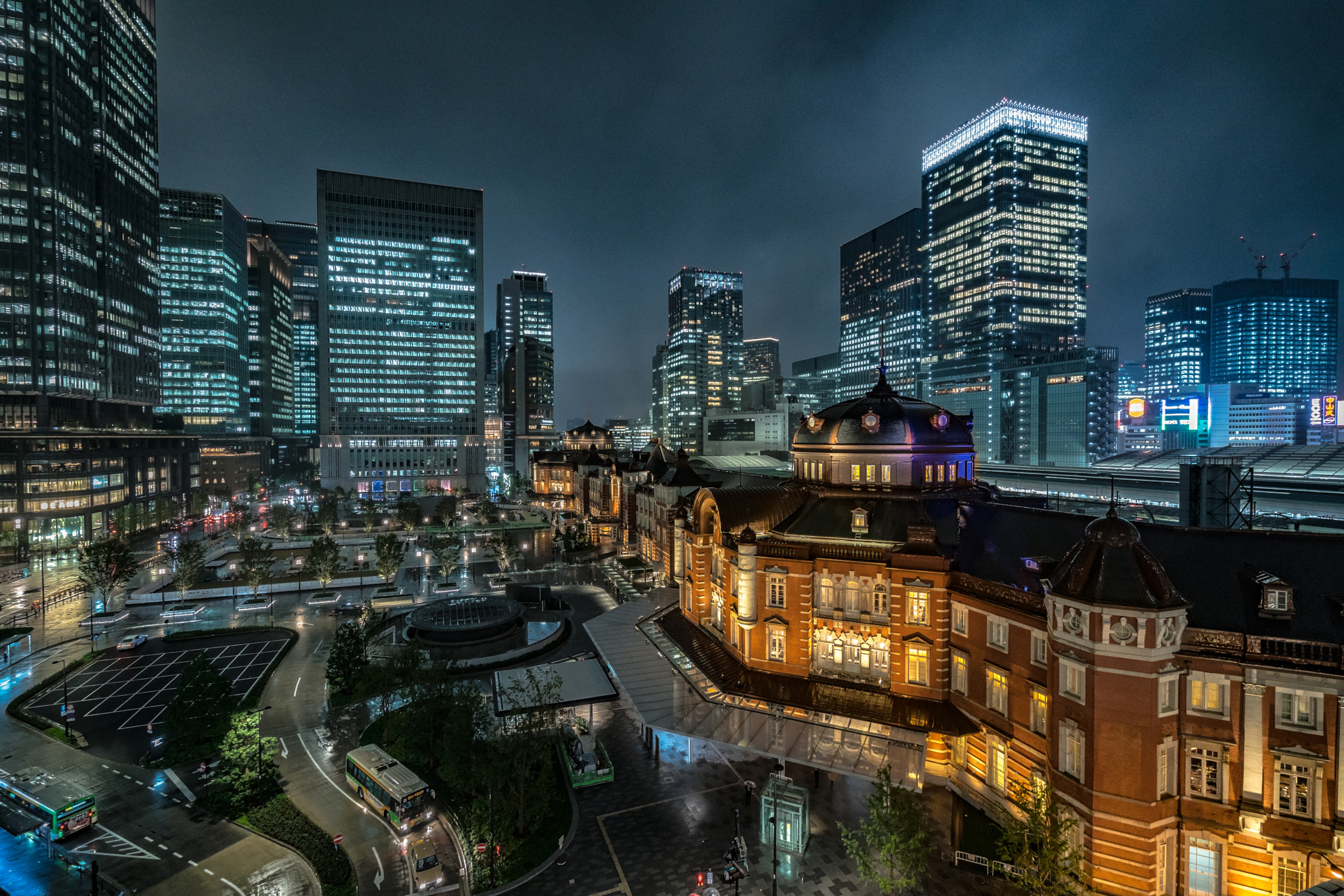
- Gyoko Street with Tokyo Station at the end Naka Street Hibiya-bori moat Tokyo Station
- Interactive map of Marunouchi
- Coordinates: 35°40′53″N 139°45′57″E
- Founder: Yanosuke Iwasaki (as a business district)

Area
  - Total: 0.8082 km^{2} (0.3120 sq mi)
- Elevation: 3.4 m (11 ft)

Population (2024)
  - Total: 9
  - Density: 11/km^{2} (29/sq mi)
- Postal code: 100-0005

Marunouchi (丸の内) is an area in Chiyoda, Tokyo, Japan, located between Tokyo Station and the Imperial Palace (皇居, Kōkyo). The name, meaning "inside the circle", derives from its location within the palace's outer moat. Marunouchi is the core of Tokyo's central business district as well as one of the main financial centres in Japan. 20 of the Fortune Global 500 companies are headquartered in the area as of 2021, while many other such companies based outside Japan have Asian or Japanese offices there. Together with the neighbouring districts of Yūrakuchō (有楽町) and Ōtemachi (大手町), Marunouchi is part of a larger business district sometimes referred to as Daimaruyū (大丸有).

== History ==
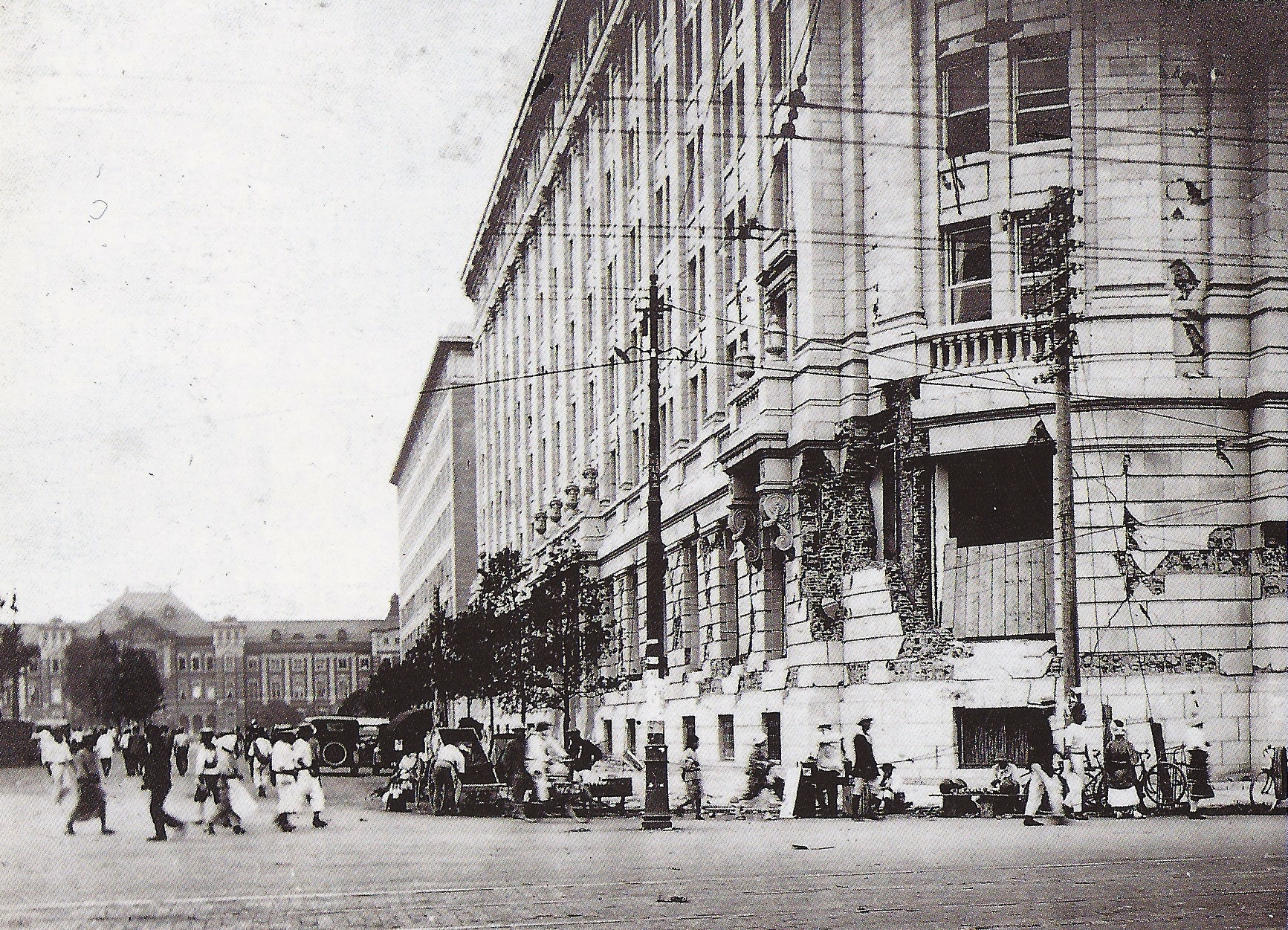
Marunouchi in the aftermath of the 1923 Great Kantō earthquake; the NYK building (foreground), the Marunouchi Building (midground), Tokyo Station (background)

In 1590, before shogun Tokugawa Ieyasu entered Edo Castle, the area now known as Marunouchi was an inlet of Tokyo Bay and had the name Hibiya. With the expansion of the castle, this inlet was filled, beginning in 1592. A new outer moat was constructed, and the earlier moat became the inner moat. The area took the name Okuruwauchi ("within the enclosure"). Daimyōs, particularly shinpan and fudai, constructed their mansions here, and with 24 such estates, the area also became known as daimyō kōji ("daimyō alley"). The offices of the North and South Magistrates, and that of the Finance Magistrate, were also here.

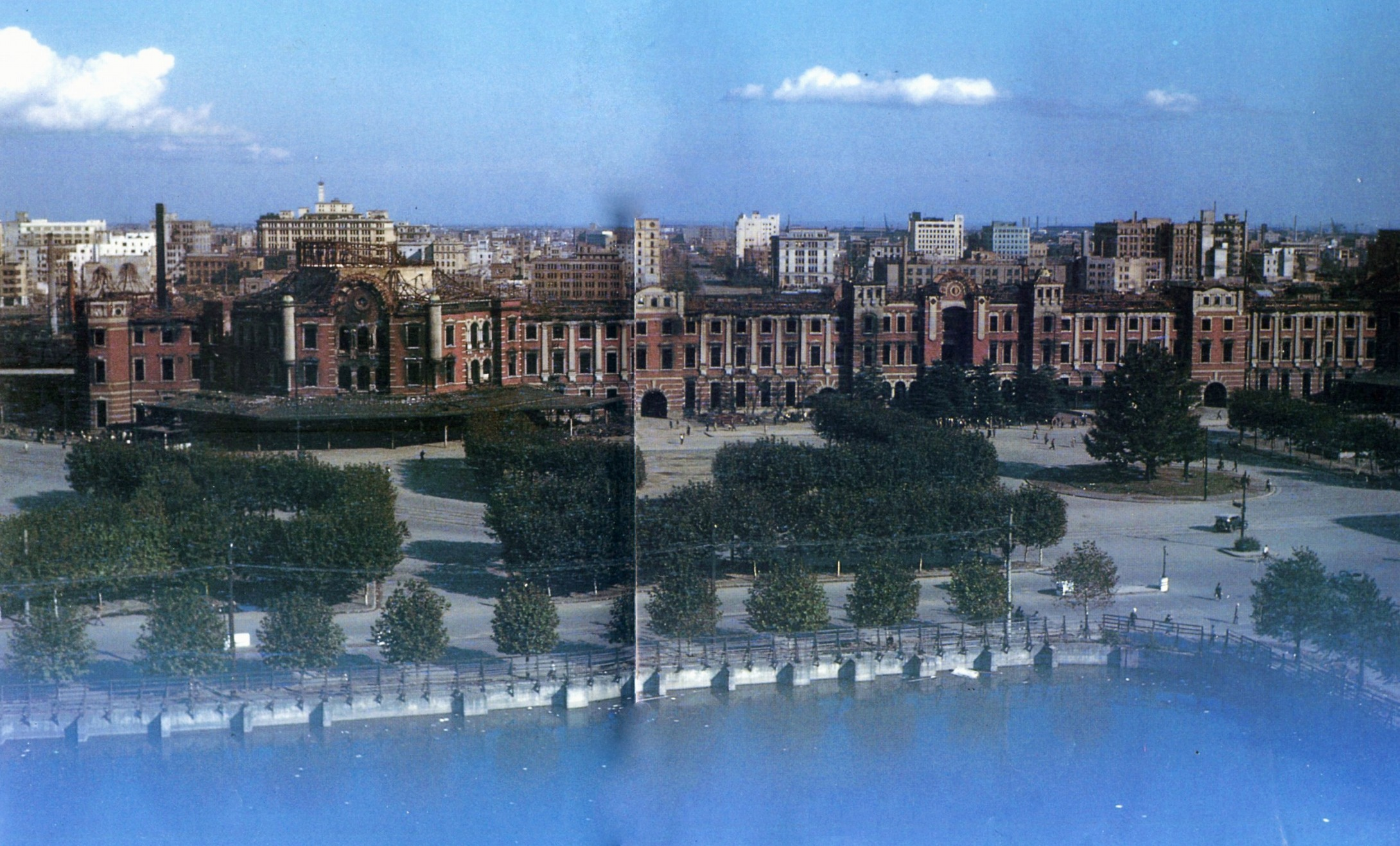
Tokyo Station after the Great Raid of 25 May 1945: the foundation of the Shin-Marunouchi Building, whose construction was interrupted due to the war, was used as a fire-fighting reservoir.

Following the Meiji Restoration, Marunouchi came under control of the national government, which erected barracks and parade grounds for the Imperial Japanese Army. In 1890 Iwasaki Yanosuke, brother of the founder (and later the second leader) of Mitsubishi, purchased the land for 1.5 million yen. As the company developed the land, it came to be known as Mitsubishi-ga-hara (the "Mitsubishi Fields"). Much of the land remains under the control of Mitsubishi Estate Co., and the headquarters of many companies in the Mitsubishi Group are in Marunouchi.

The government of Tokyo constructed its headquarters on the site of the former Kōchi han in 1894. They moved it to the present Tokyo Metropolitan Government Building in Shinjuku in 1991, and the Tokyo International Forum and Toyota Tsusho Corporation now stands on the site. Nearly a quarter of Japan's GDP is generated in this area. Tokyo Station opened in 1914, and the Marunouchi Building in 1923. Marunouchi was targeted in the 1974 Mitsubishi Heavy Industries bombing by the radical far-left terrorist organisation East Asia Anti-Japan Armed Front. Tokyo Station reopened on 1 October 2012 after a 5 year refurbishment.

== Landmarks ==
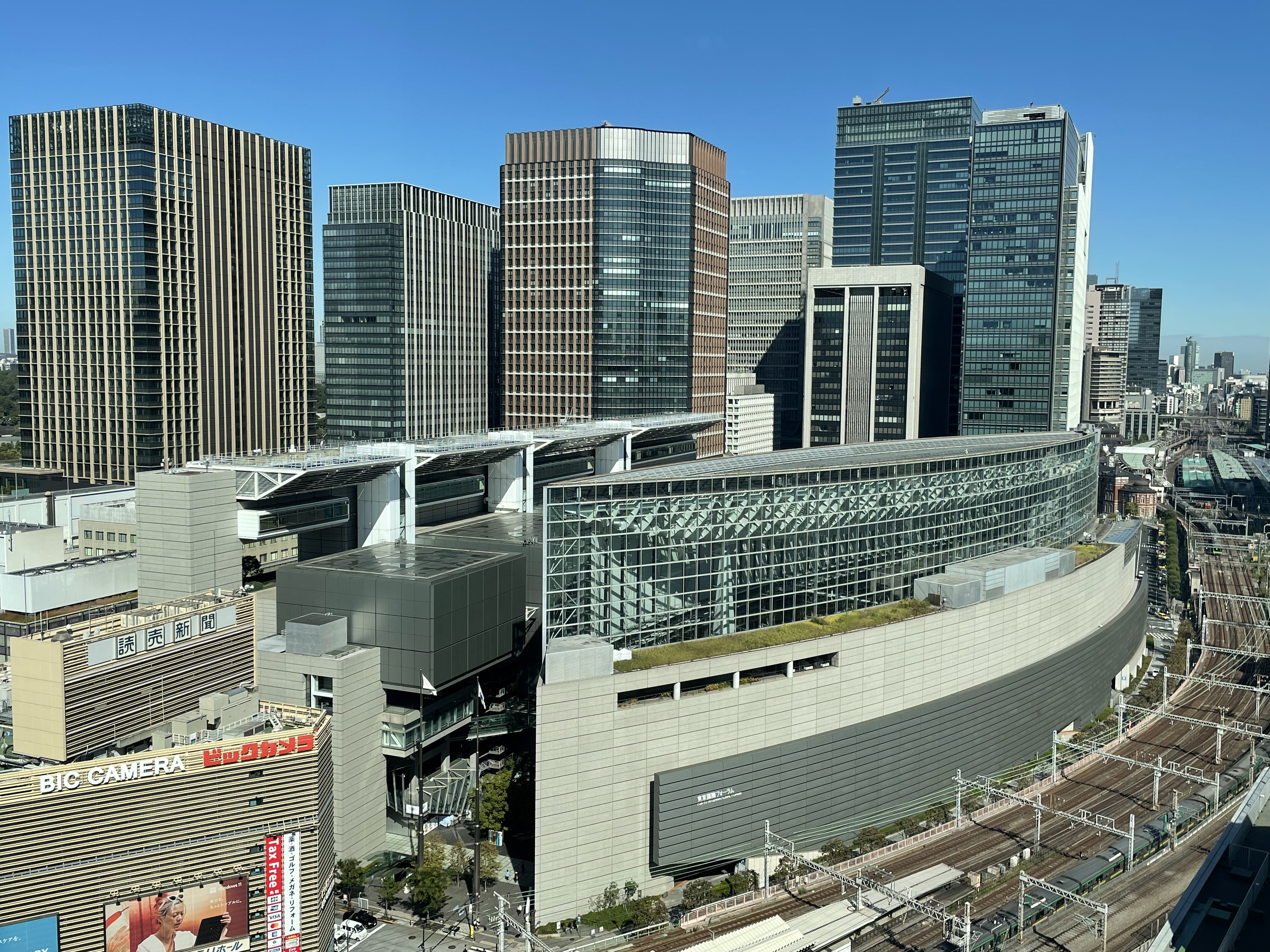
Tokyo International Forum, a multi-purpose culture centre

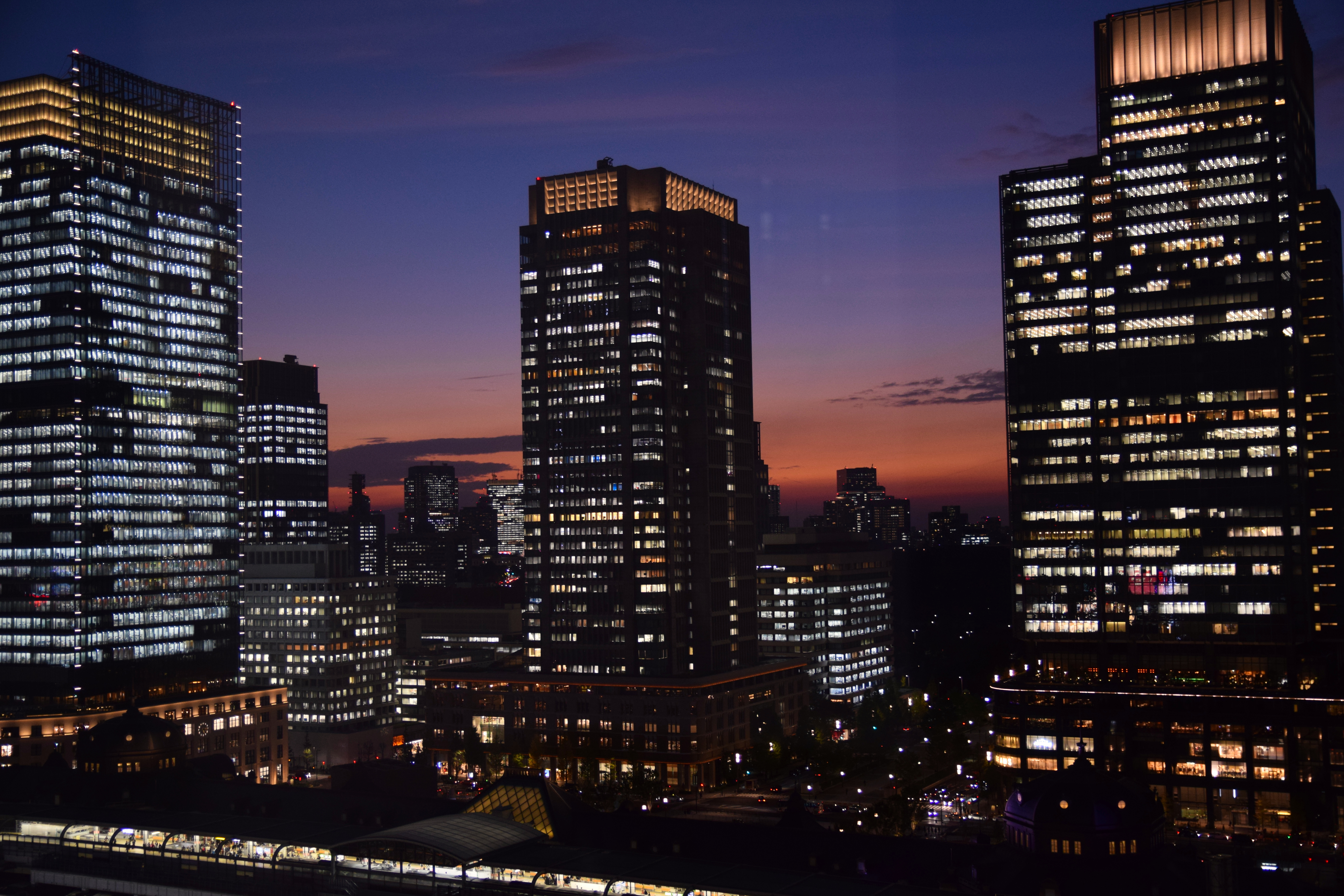
Three buildings in Marunouchi redeveloped in the 2000s; the JP Tower (left), the Marunouchi Building (centre), the Shin-Marunouchi building (right)

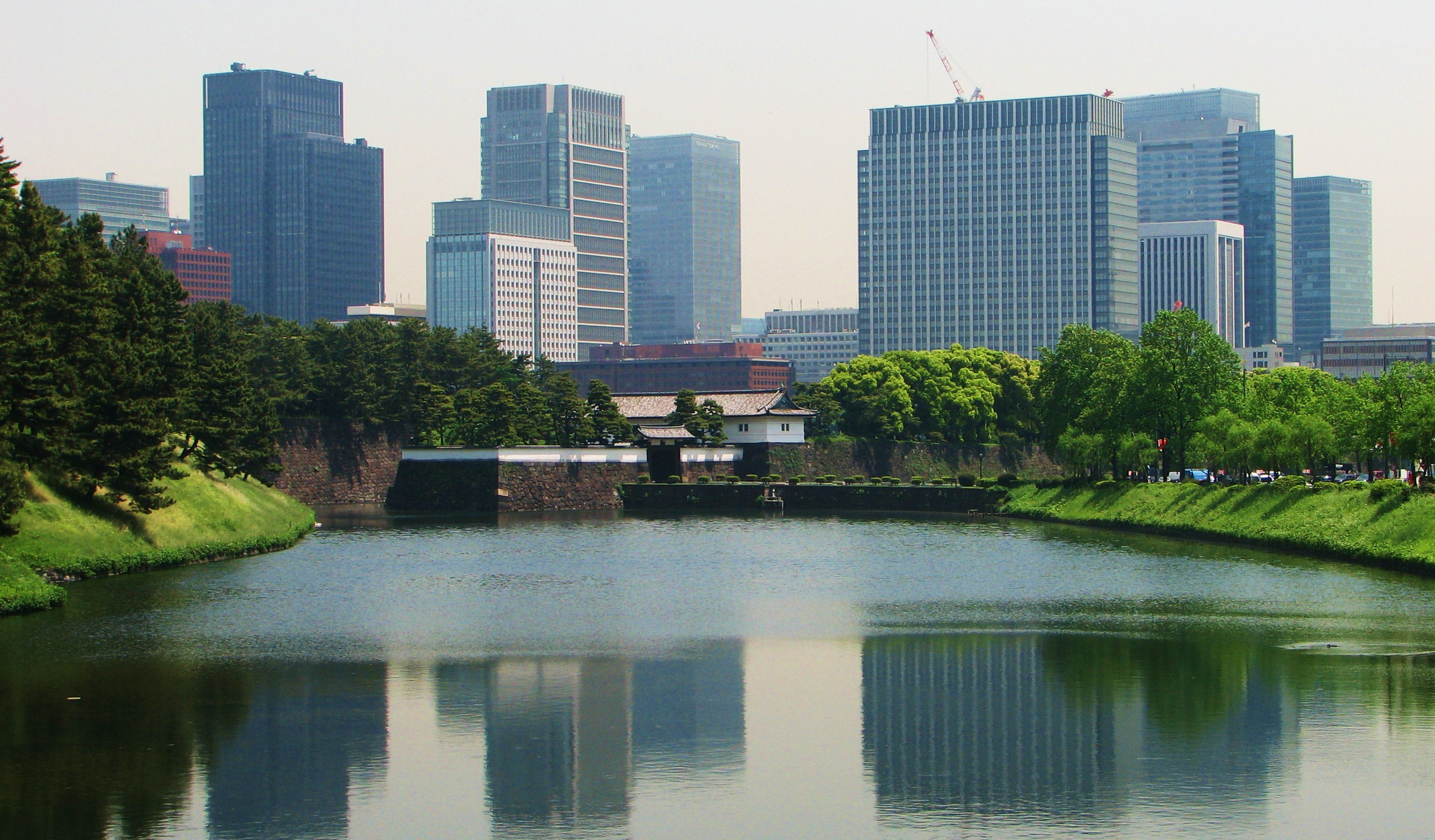
Part of Marunouchi seen from the west

=== Extant historical buildings ===
==== Fully preserved ====
- Tokyo Station (1914)
- Meiji Insurance Headquarters (1934)
- Mitsubishi Ichigokan Museum (1894, rebuilt partially using original materials in 2009)

==== Partially preserved ====
- Tōkyō Central Post Office (1933, preserved as the lower-storey structure of the JP Tower since 2012)
- Japan Industry Club (1920, preserved as the lower-storey structure of the Mitsubishi Trust&Banking Head Office since 2003)
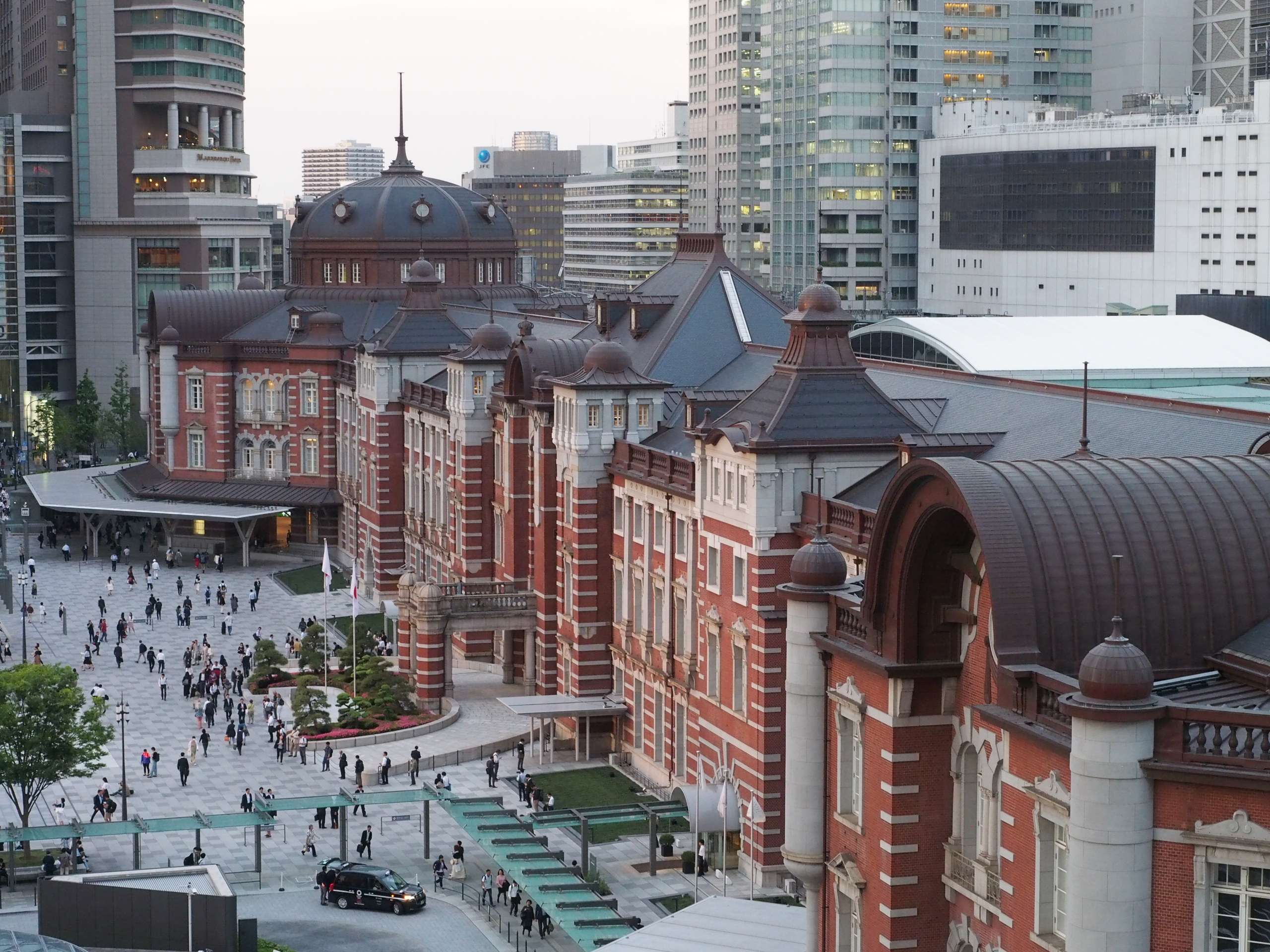
Tokyo Station (1914)

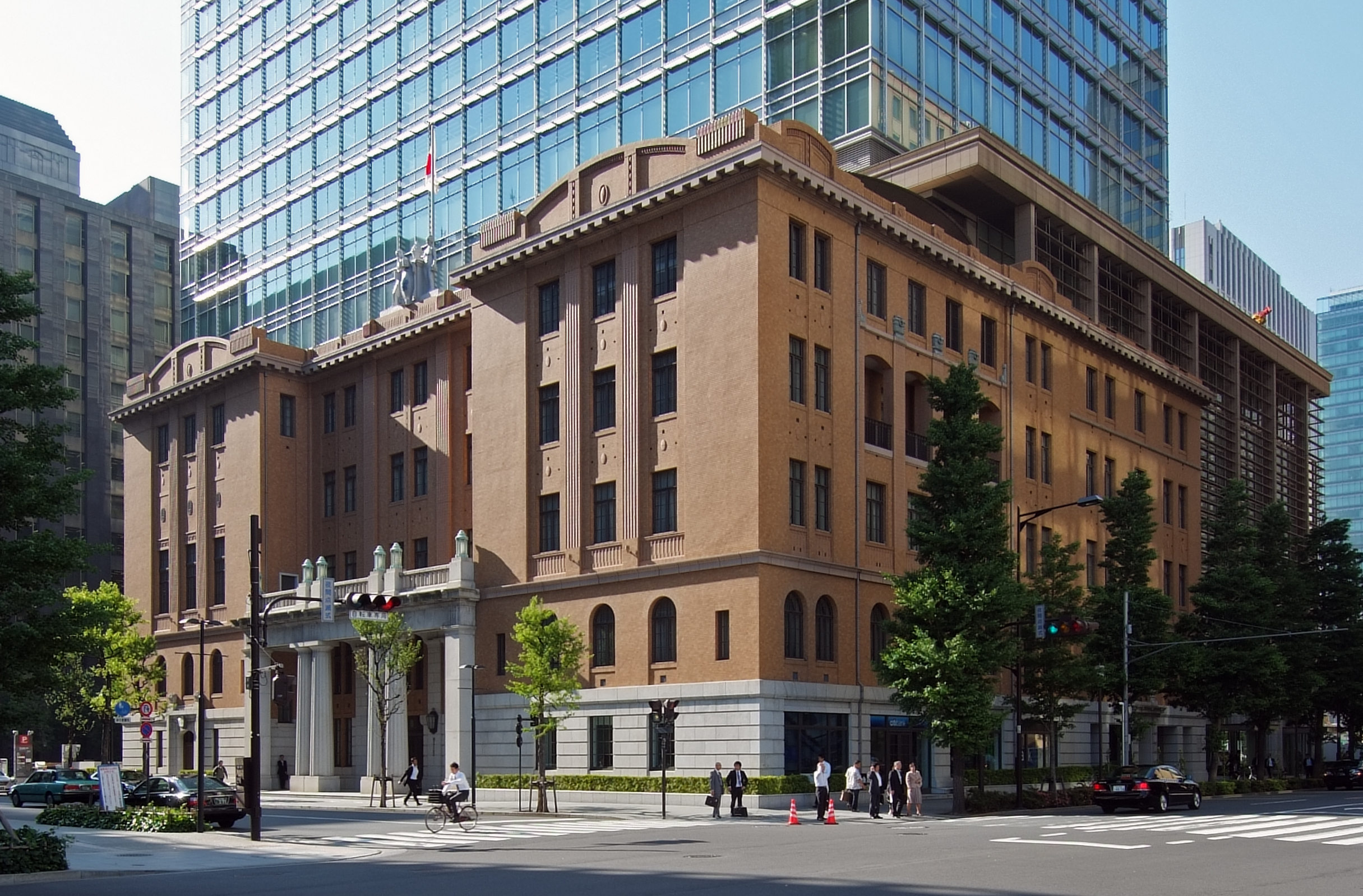
The Industry Club of Japan (1920)

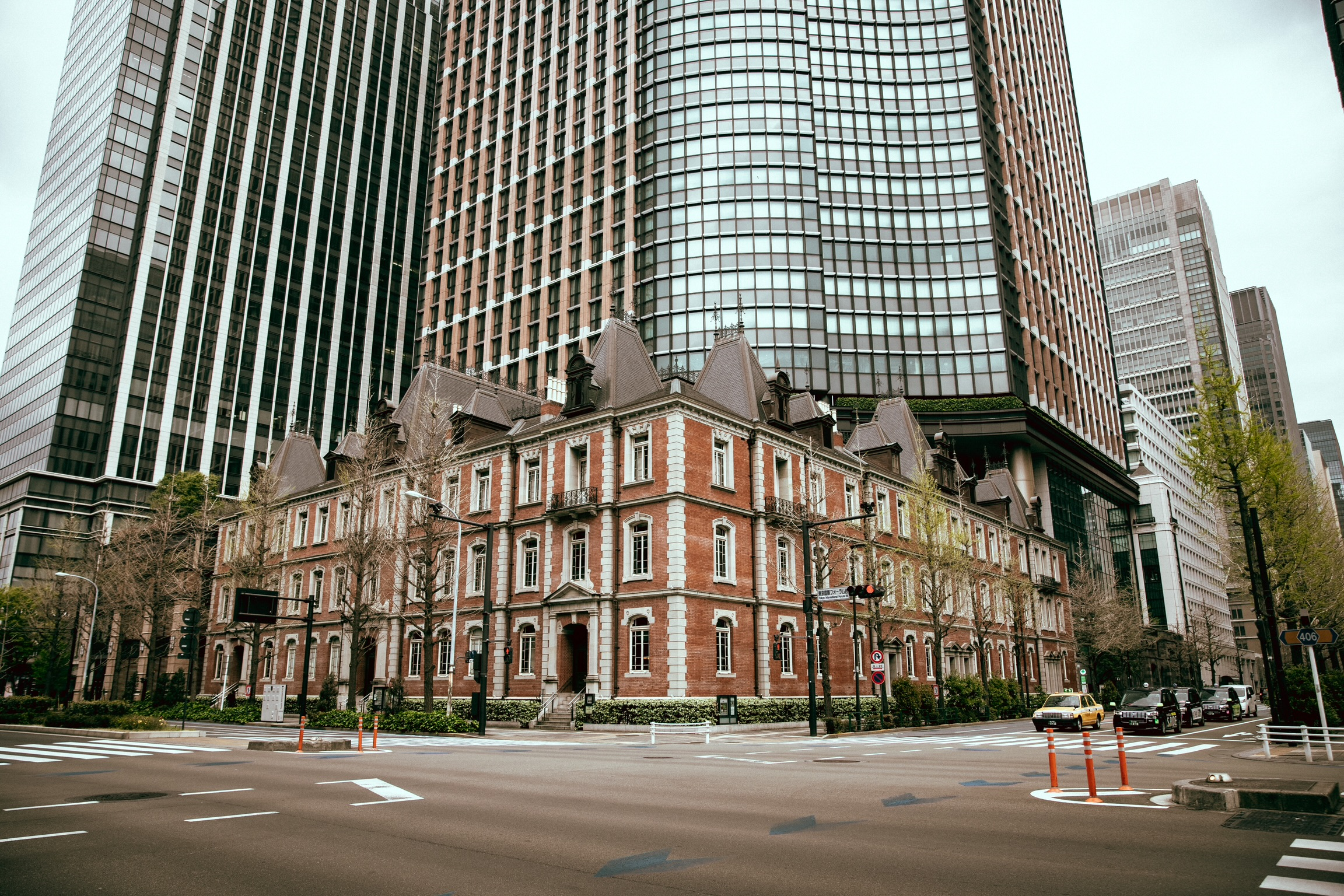
Mitsubishi Ichigokan Museum (1894/2009)

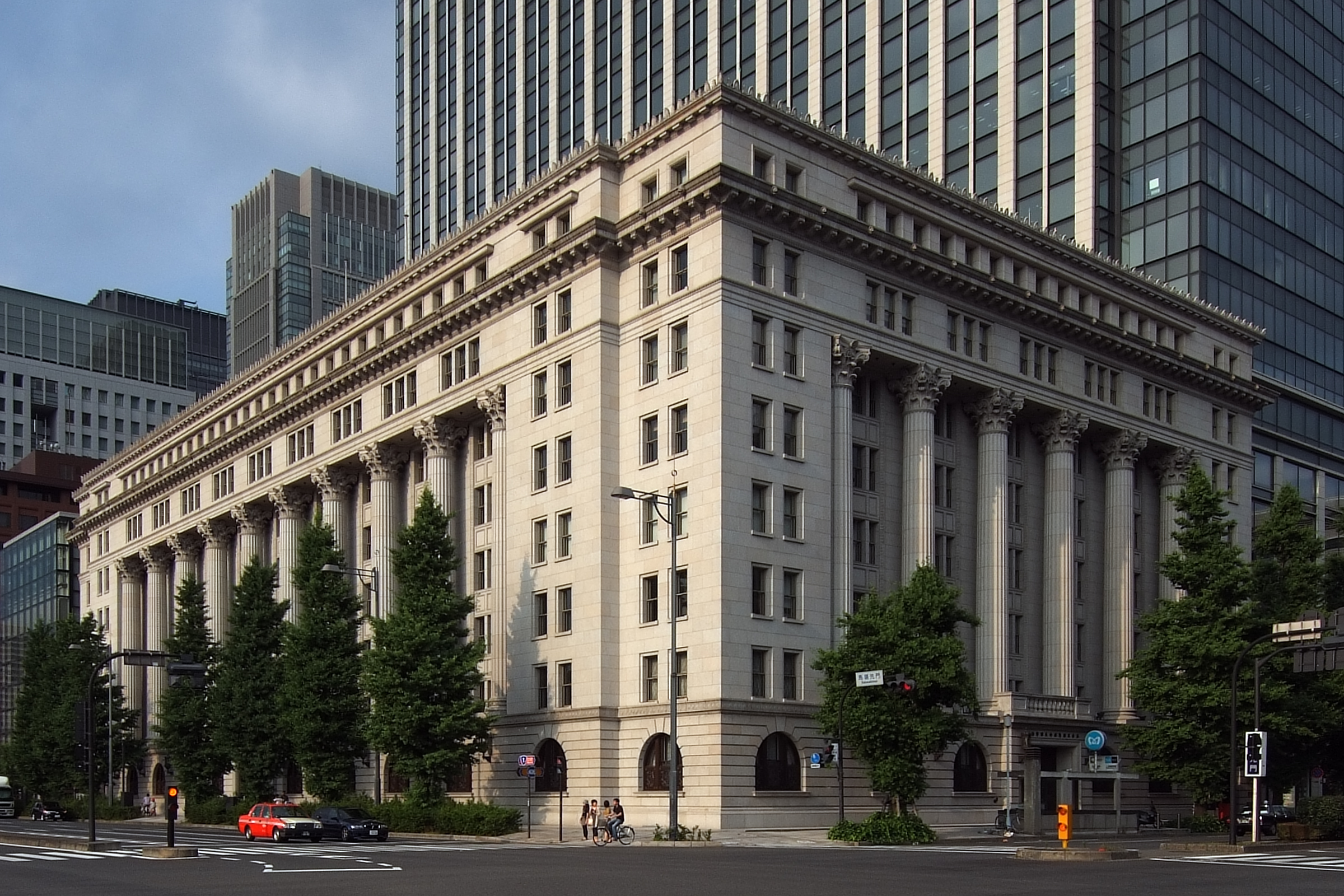
Meiji Insurance Headquarters (1934)

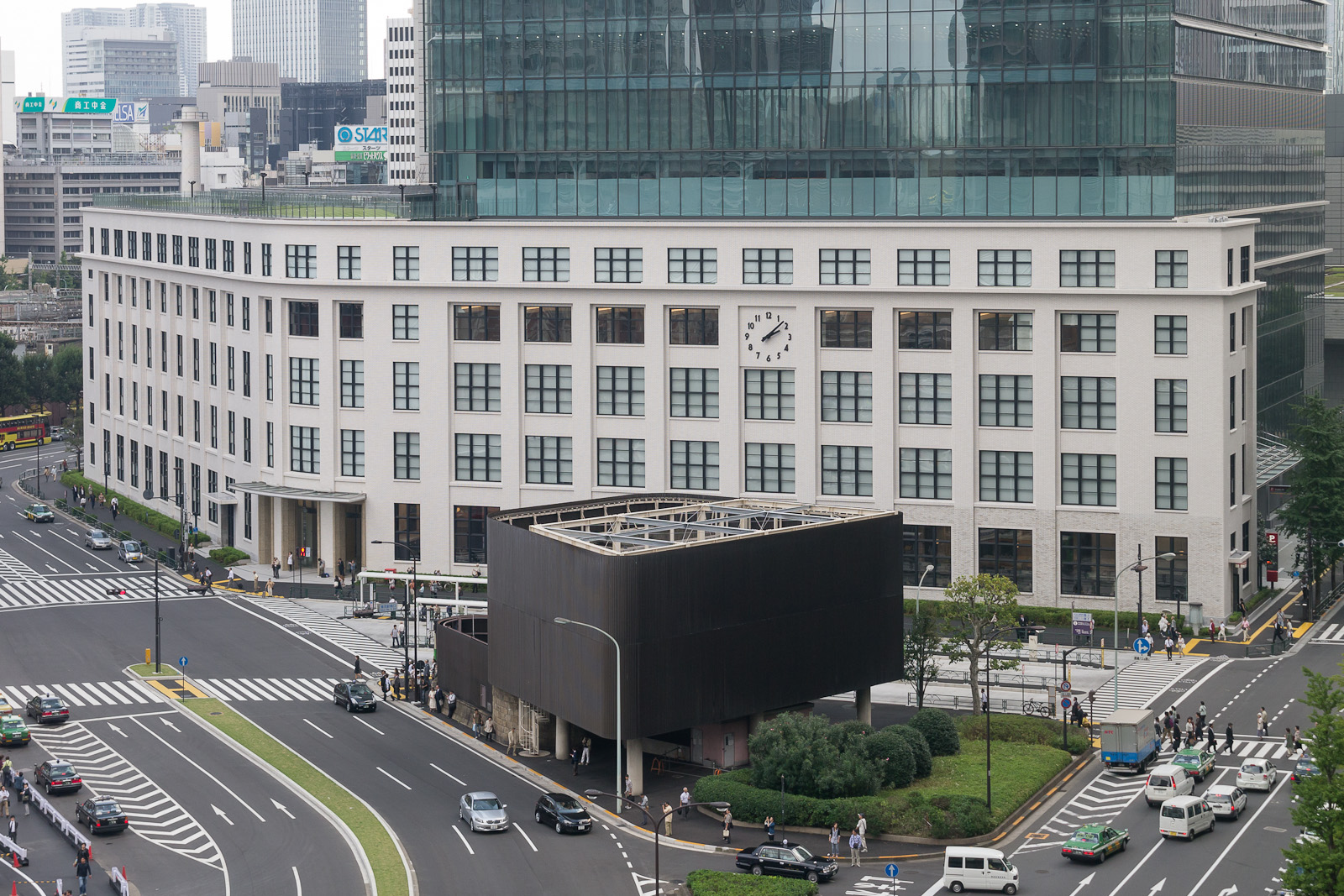
Tokyo Central Post Office (1933)

== Companies based in Marunouchi ==
Calbee has its headquarters in the Marunouchi Trust Tower Main. Konica Minolta has its headquarters in the Marunouchi Center Building in Marunouchi.

- Mitsubishi Group companies:
  - MUFG
  - Meiji Yasuda Life Insurance
  - Mitsubishi Corporation
  - Mitsubishi Heavy Industries
  - Mitsubishi Electric
  - Nippon Yusen
  - Tokio Marine Nichido
  - Asahi Glass
- Hitachi
- Furukawa Electric
- Nikko Citigroup
- Ushio, Inc.
- Tanaka Kikinzoku Group

Japan Airlines used to have its headquarters in the Tokyo Building in Marunouchi.

=== International companies ===
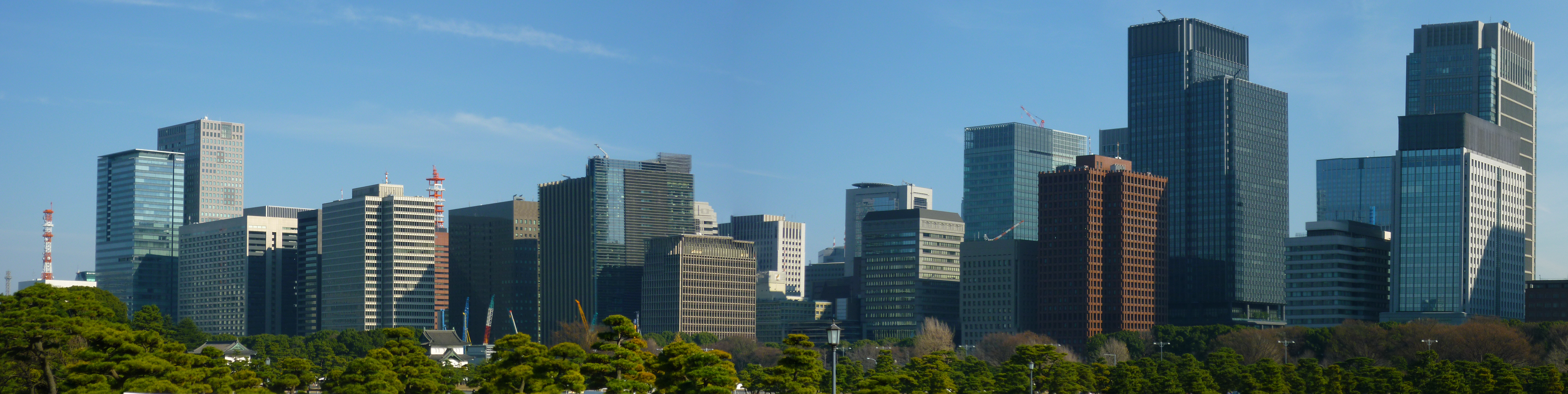
Skyline of Marunouchi district, viewed from Imperial Palace gardens

Marunouchi also houses the Japan offices of Aeroméxico (Pacific Century Place Marunouchi), Bain & Company, Bayerische Landes Bank, Bloomberg, First National Bank of Boston, BNP Paribas, BT Group, Citigroup, Banca Commerciale Italiana, Deloitte Touche Tohmatsu, Bank of India, JPMorgan Chase, KPMG, Latham & Watkins, Mellon Bank, Morgan, Lewis & Bockius, Morrison & Foerster, NatWest Group, Nikko Cordial, Nikko Citigroup, Rabobank, Bank Negara Indonesia, Overseas Union Bank, Philadelphia National Bank, PwC, Ropes & Gray, Royal Insurance, Standard Chartered and Standard & Poor's.

== Rail and subway stations ==
- Nijūbashimae Station (Chiyoda Line)
- Otemachi Station (Chiyoda Line, Hanzōmon Line, Marunouchi Line, Toei Mita Line, Tozai Line)
- Tokyo Station (Chūō Line, Keihin-Tohoku Line, Keiyo Line, Marunouchi Line, Shinkansen, Sōbu Line, Yamanote Line, Yokosuka Line)

== Education ==
Chiyoda Board of Education operates public elementary and junior high schools. Chiyoda Elementary School (千代田小学校) is the zoned elementary of Marunouchi 1-3 chōme. There is a freedom of choice system for junior high schools in Chiyoda Ward, and so there are no specific junior high school zones.
