= Nijūbashimae Station =

Metro station in Tokyo, Japan

Coordinates: 35.680324°N 139.761715°E

Nijubashimae Station (Marunouchi) 二重橋前駅 〈丸の内〉

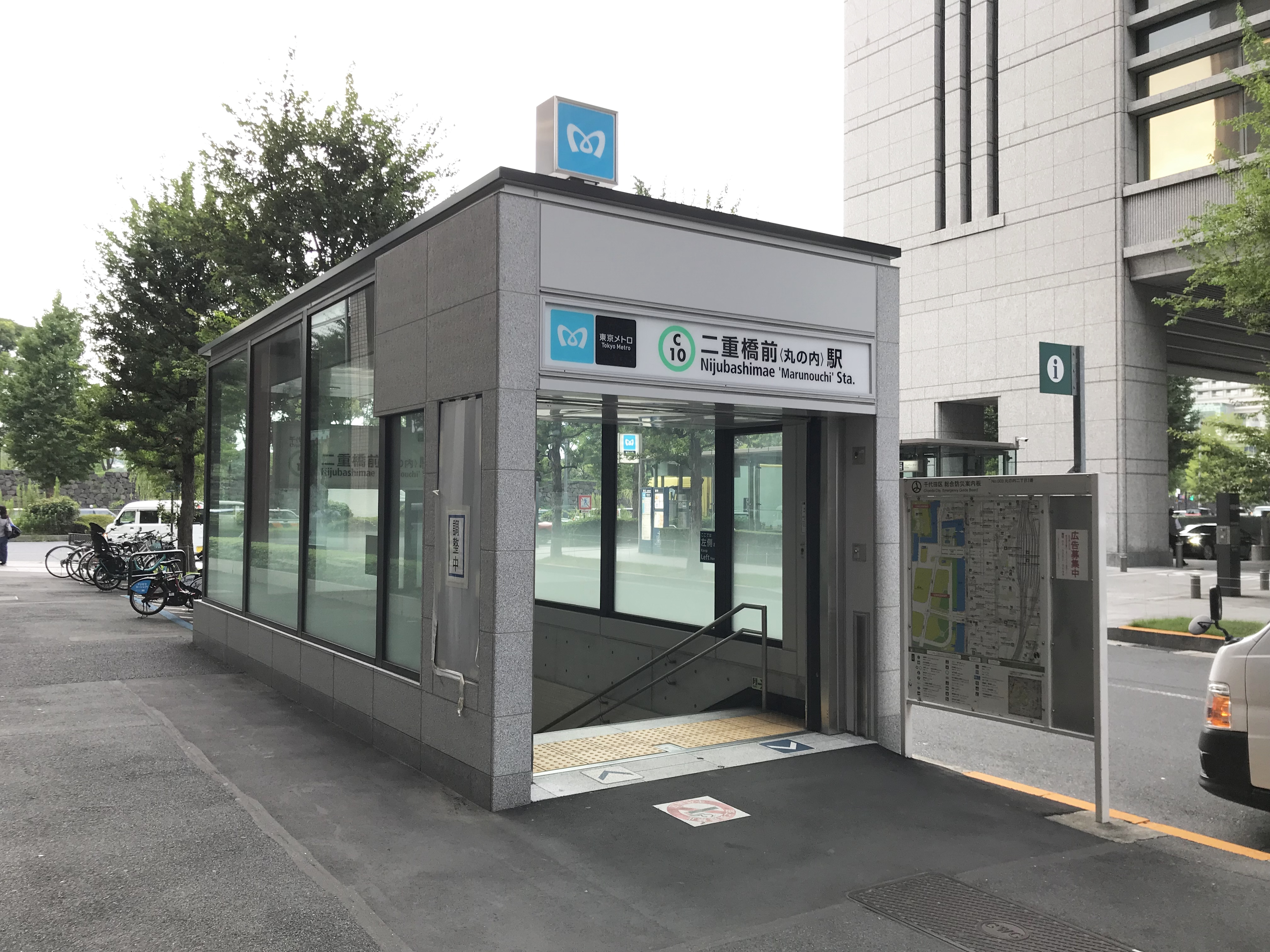
- Exit 4 in 2019

General information
- Location: 2-3-1 Marunouchi, Chiyoda-ku, Tokyo; Japan
- Operator: Tokyo Metro
- Line: Chiyoda Line
- Platforms: 1 island platform
- Tracks: 2

Construction
- Structure type: Underground

Other information
- Station code: C-10

History
- Opened: 20 March 1971; 55 years ago

Passengers
- 34,898 (Daily average, 2017)

Services
Preceding station	Tokyo Metro	Following station
Hibiya towards Yoyogi-Uehara	Chiyoda Line	Ōtemachi towards Kita-Ayase
Location
- Location within Tokyo Yamanote Loop Location within Tokyo wards area Location within Japan

Nijubashimae Station (Japanese: 二重橋前駅, Hepburn: Nijūbashimae-eki), also known as Nijubashimae Station (Marunouchi) (二重橋前駅 〈丸の内〉) is an underground railway station on the Tokyo Metro Chiyoda Line in Chiyoda, Tokyo, Japan, operated by Tokyo Metro. It is close to Nijubashi Bridge and the Tokyo Imperial Palace (though not as close as Sakuradamon Station). Tokyo Station is also within walking distance to/from this station - a passageway containing the Gyoko-dori Underground Gallery links the two stations underground.

== Lines ==
The station is served by the Tokyo Metro Chiyoda Line, and is numbered C-10.

The Toei Mita Line passes close by, but does not serve this station.

== Station layout ==
The station is composed of one island platform serving two tracks.

=== Platforms ===
1	Chiyoda Line	for Omote-sando and Yoyogi-uehara; Odakyu Odawara Line for Hon-Atsugi and Isehara
2	Chiyoda Line	for Otemachi, Kita-Senju, Ayase, and Kita-ayase; Joban Line (Local) for Matsudo, Kashiwa and Toride (via Ayase)

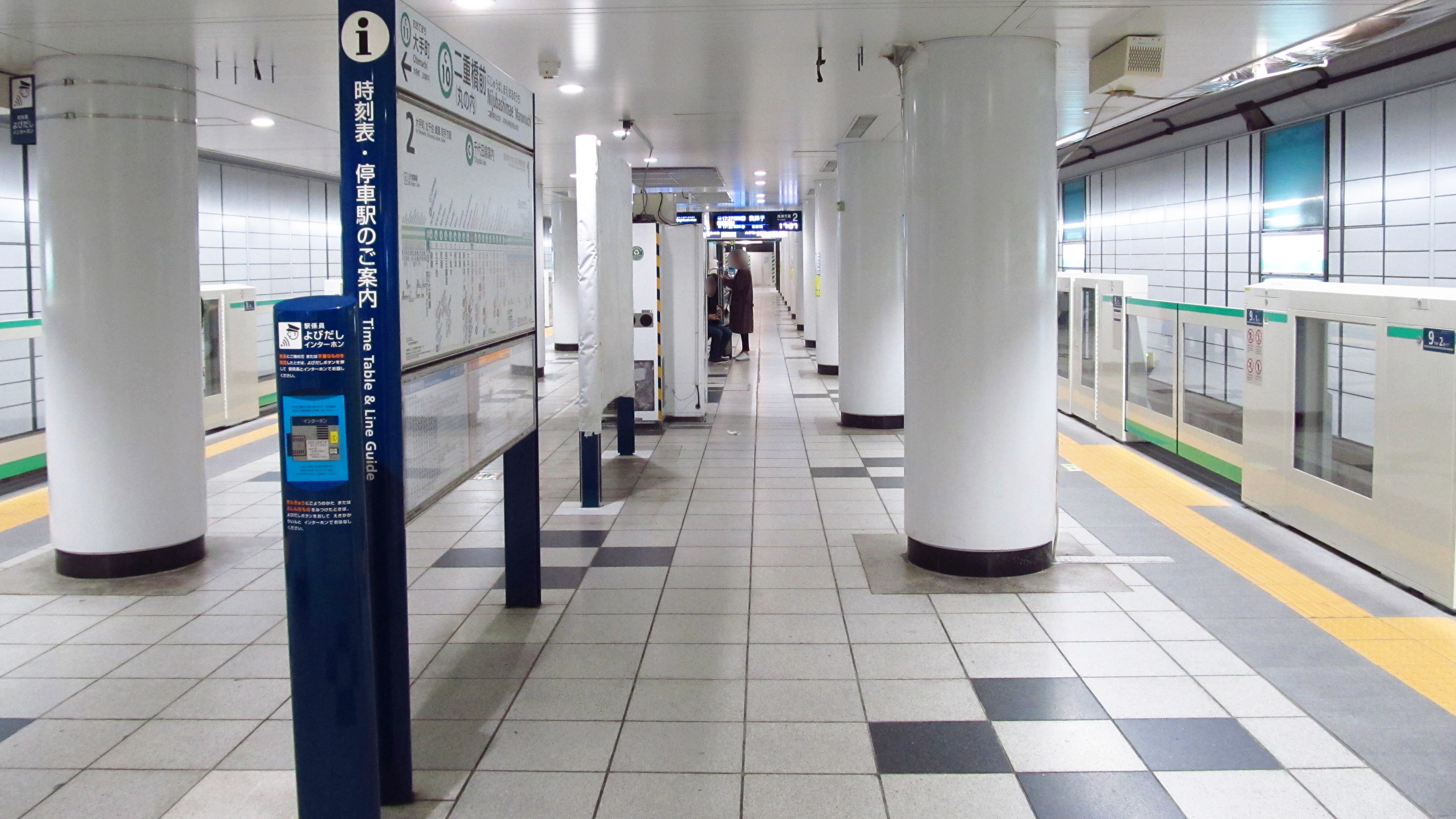
Platforms, 2019

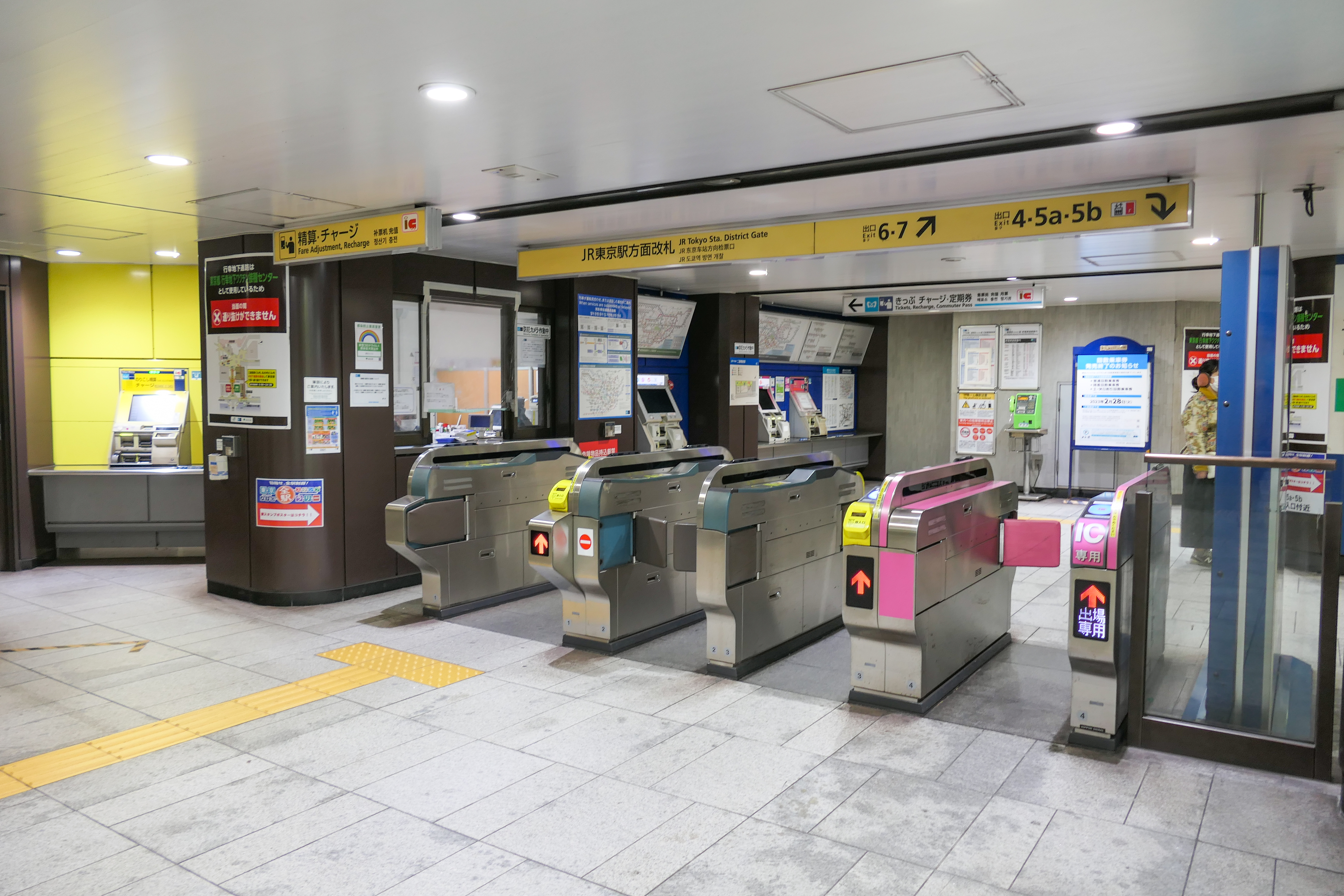
JR Tokyo Station district gate

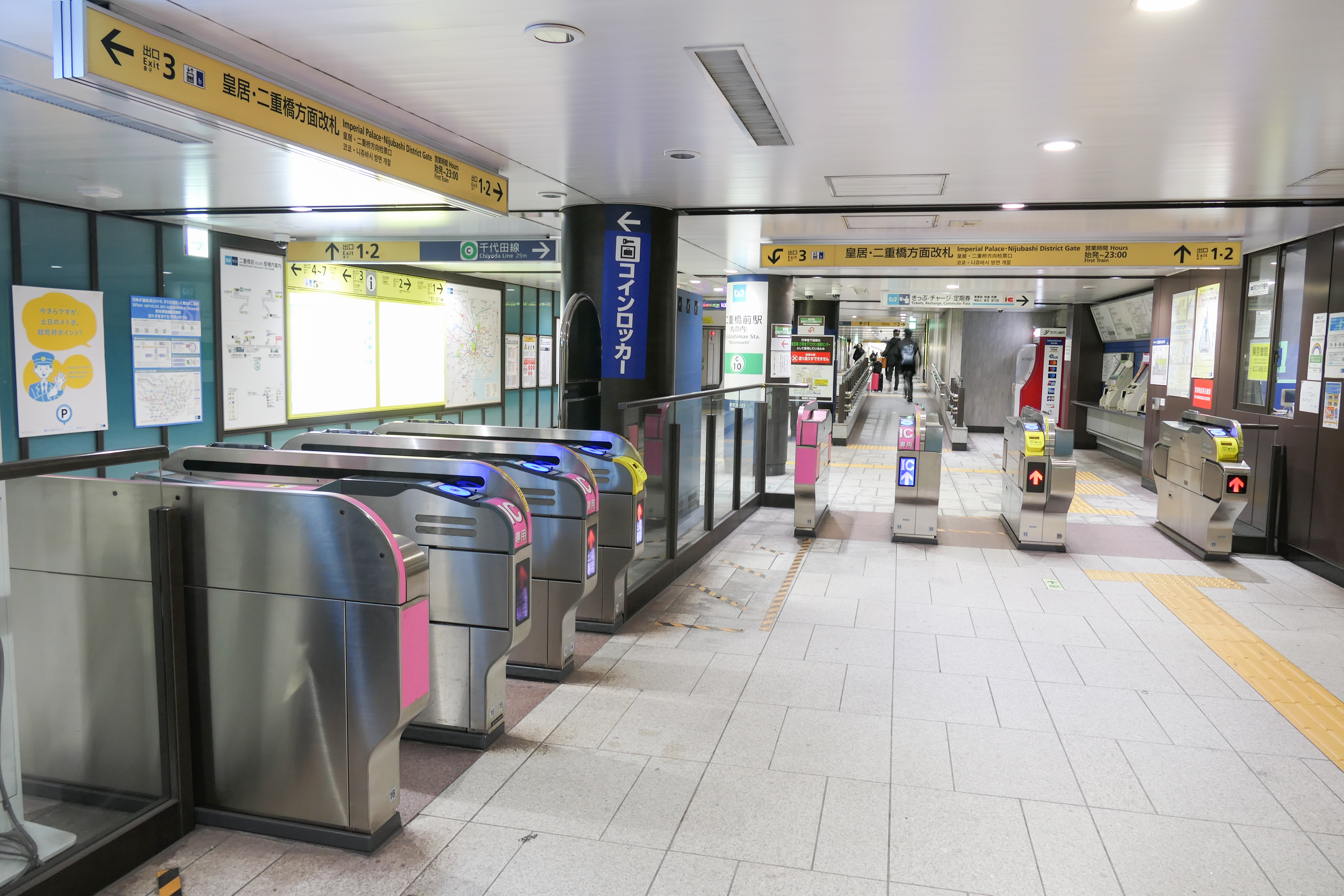
Imperial Palace and Nijubashi district gate

== History ==
Nijubashimae Station was opened on March 20, 1971 by the Teito Rapid Transit Authority (TRTA).

The station facilities were inherited by Tokyo Metro after the privatization of the TRTA in 2004.

Since 17 March 2018, Nijubashimae Station has been also known as Nijubashimae Station (Marunouchi) as a secondary station name to increase awareness of the station's location in the Marunouchi area, and to encourage passengers to use the station in conjunction with the surrounding stations.

== Surrounding area ==
- Tokyo Station
- Nijubashi, the bridge this station is named after
- Tokyo Imperial Palace
