= CapitaGreen =

Office skyscraper in Singapore

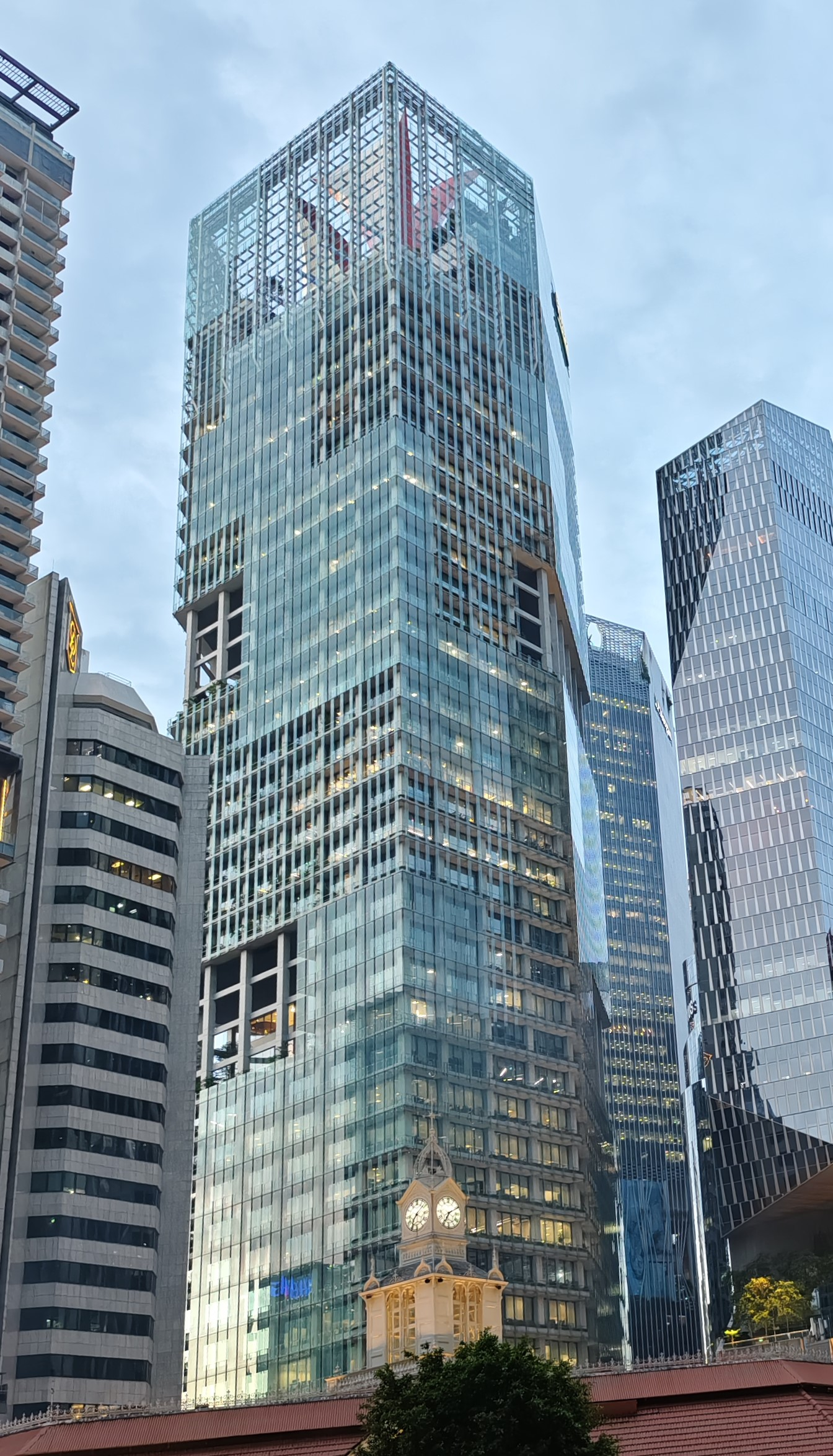
- Interactive map of the CapitaGreen area

General information
- Type: Commercial offices
- Location: Raffles Place; Downtown Core, Singapore, 138 Market Street, Singapore 048946
- Coordinates: 1°16′54.840″N 103°51′1.080″E
- Construction started: 2012
- Completed: 2014
- Cost: S$1.266 billion
- Owner: CapitaLand Commercial Trust; CapitaLand Limited; Mitsubishi Estate Asia

Height
- Height: 245 m (804 ft)

Technical details
- Floor count: 40, 3 below ground
- Floor area: 82,003 m^{2} (882,670 sq ft)
- Lifts/elevators: 27

Design and construction
- Architect: Toyo Ito
- Architecture firm: Takenaka Corporation; Toyo Ito & Associates
- Developer: CapitaLand Commercial Trust; CapitaLand Limited; Mitsubishi Estate Asia
- Structural engineer: Sasaki Associates; Takenaka Corporation
- Main contractor: Takenaka Corporation

Other information
- Parking: 180

Website
- Official website

CapitaGreen, also known as Market Street Tower, is an office tower located in Raffles Place, Singapore. The building was designed by Toyo Ito and completed in 2014. With a height of 245 m (804 ft), it is one of the tallest skyscrapers in Singapore.

== Architecture ==
The CapitaGreen building was designed to be "like a plant growing towards the sun", with a façade that incorporates living plants. The rooftop garden, known as the "Sky Forest", has 40 different kinds of tree and shrub. The rooftop garden features a 45m-high (150ft) windcatcher structure, designed to look like flower petals, that captures cool fresh air and channels it into the office floors.

== Awards ==
CapitaGreen won the 2015 CTBUH Skyscraper Award for Best Tall Building in the Asia and Australasia Region.

== See also ==
- List of tallest buildings in Singapore
