= Maison Hermès =

Building in Ginza, Tokyo, Japan

Coordinates: 35°40′18.8″N 139°45′47.8″E

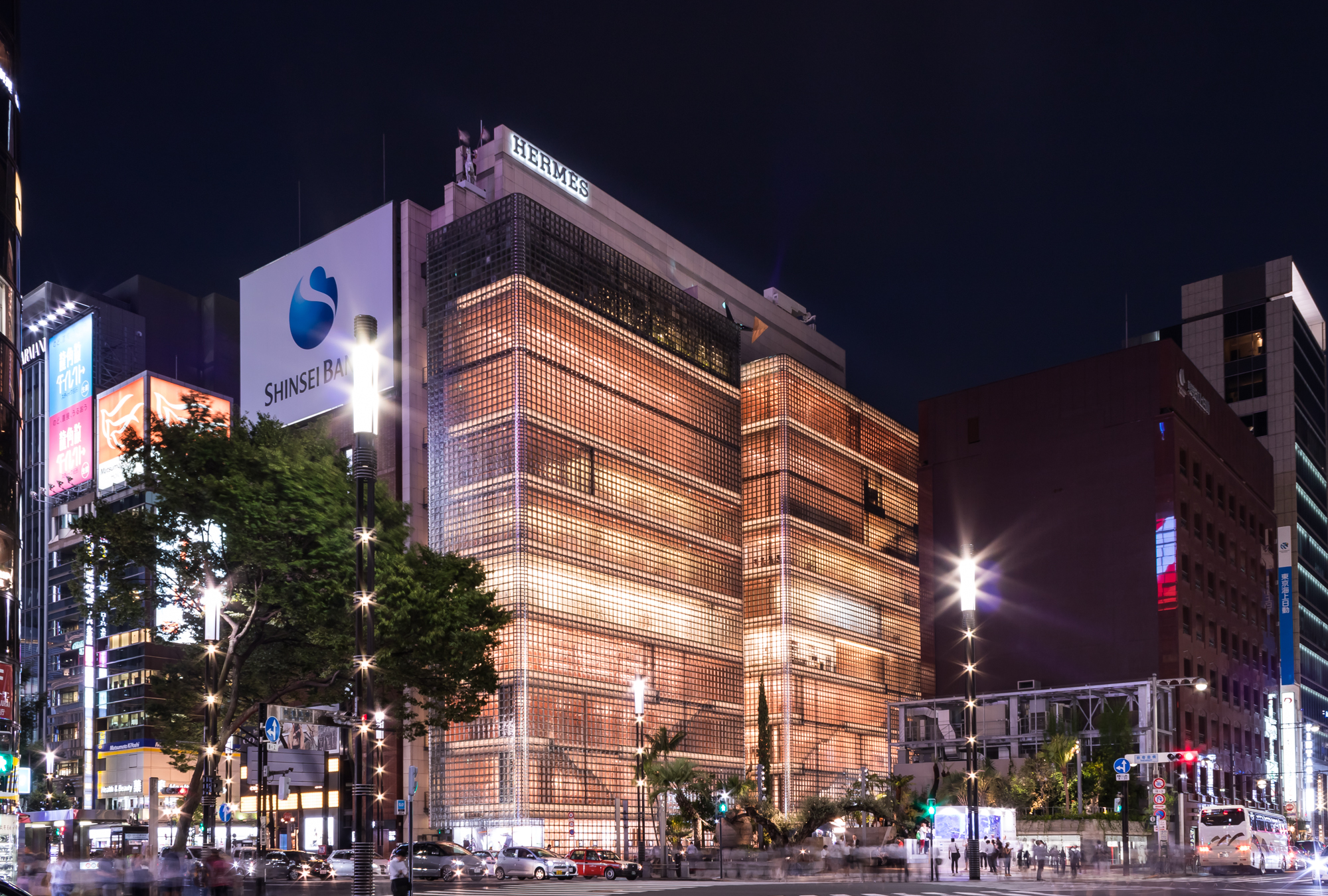
Maison Hermès, Tokyo

Maison Hermès is a building in Tokyo, Japan. It is located at 5-4-1 Ginza, Chūō, Tokyo. Constructed between 1998 and 2001, it was designed by Renzo Piano assisted by Bohlin Cywinski Jackson of Berkeley, California and in collaboration with Takenaka Corporation. The building is the flagship store and corporate headquarters of the French luxury-goods corporation, Hermès, in Japan. It is a 6,000 square metre (65,000 square feet) structure that houses workshops and offices, a shopping space, exhibition areas and multimedia quarters. In addition to a roof garden at the top of the building, there is also a recess which divides the long facade into two, forming a courtyard that delivers an access to the Tokyo Metro's Ginza Station two levels below.
