= Takenaka Carpentry Tools Museum =

Museum in Japan

- 竹中大工道具館
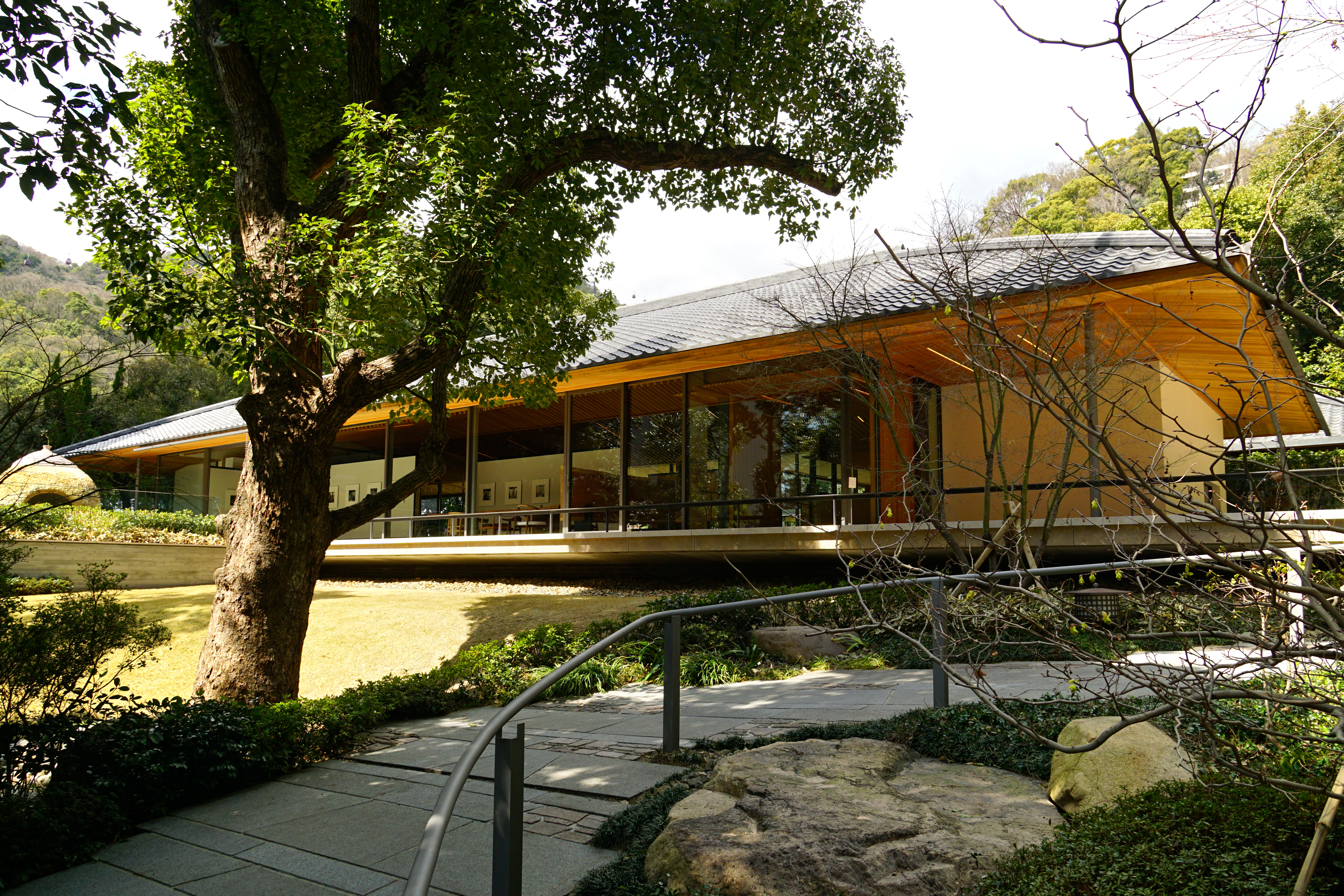
- Takenaka Carpentry Tools Museum
- Established: 1984
- Location: 7-5-1 Kumochi-cho, Chuo-ku, Kobe 651-0056, Japan
- Coordinates: 34.7068°N 135.1975°E
- Collections: Japanese and Western tools
- Collection size: More than 30,000 items of which c. 20,000 tools
- Owner: Takenaka Corporation
- Website: dougukan.jp

The Takenaka Carpentry Tools Museum is a museum of carpentry tools in Kobe, Japan. The museum was opened in 1984 with the objective of collecting and conserving ancient tools as an example of Japanese cultural heritage, in order to pass them on to the next generation through research and exhibitions.

More than 30,500 pieces of materials have been collected so far, and the museum has held exhibitions, lectures, seminars, classes outside of the museum, and workshops on the people who make use of the tools, as well as the resulting architecture and the culture of wood that surrounds it.

The project was designed and constructed by the Takenaka Corporation in collaboration with skilled woodworkers.
