= Elsa Tower 55 =

Residential skyscraper in Kawaguchi, Saitama Prefecture, Japan

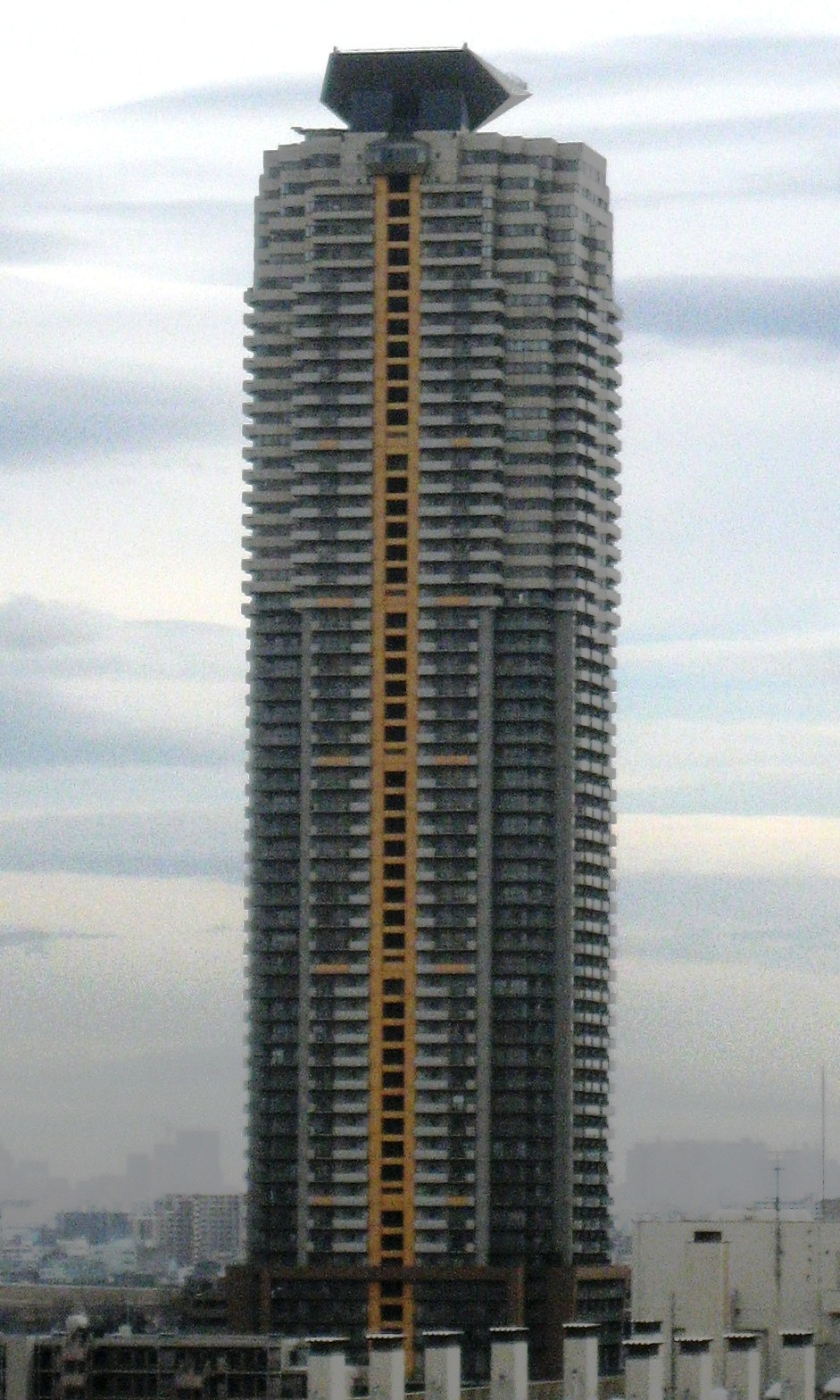

General information
- Status: Completed
- Location: 15-1, 2 Motogo, Kawaguchi, Saitama Prefecture, Japan
- Coordinates: 35.796795°N 139.731491°E
- Completed: 1998

Height
- Roof: 185.8 m (610 ft)

Technical details
- Floor count: 55 above ground 1 below ground
- Floor area: 74,342 m^{2} (800,210 sq ft)

Design and construction
- Main contractor: Takenaka Corporation

The Elsa Tower 55 (エルザタワー55, Eruza Tawā Fifutiifaibu) is a residential skyscraper located in Kawaguchi, Saitama Prefecture, Japan. Completed in 1998, it stands at 186 m (610 ft) tall. It was the tallest residential building in Japan until 2004, when Acty Shiodome overtook it.
