= Takenaka Corporation =

Japanese general contracting firm

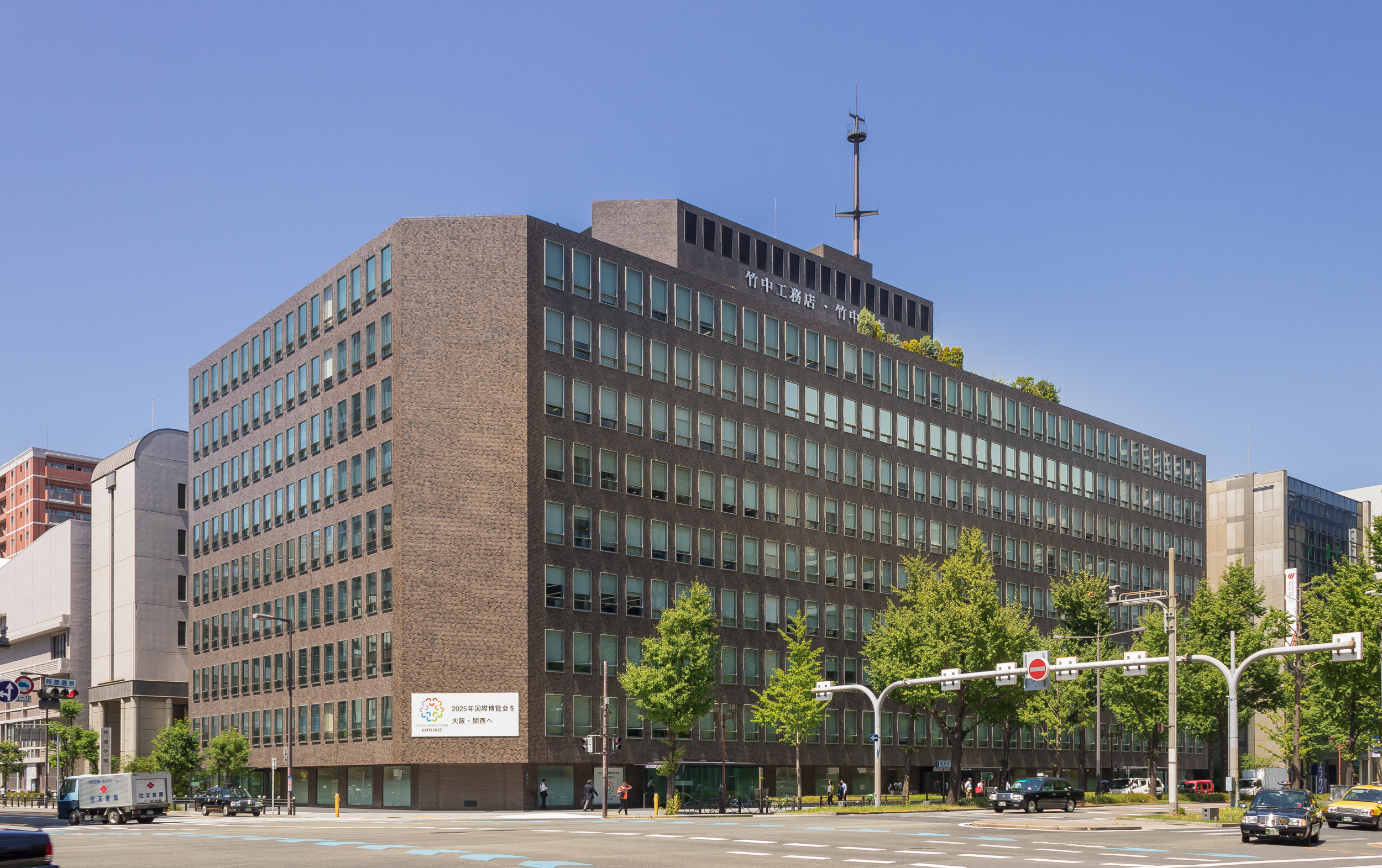
- Headquarters in Chūō-ku, Osaka
- Native name: 株式会社竹中工務店
- Romanized name: Kabushiki-gaisha Takenaka Kōmuten
- Type: Private (K.K)
- Industry: Construction, Architecture, Engineering
- Founded: 1610 (Nagoya, Japan); 1909 (Takenaka Corporation)
- Headquarters: Honmachi, Chūō-ku, Osaka, Japan
- Key people: Toichi Takenaka, Honorary Chairman of the Board, Masato Namba, Chairman, Masato Sasaki, President
- Services: Architectural Design, Construction, Renewal, Engineering, Technology, Research and development
- Revenue: ¥ 1,284 billion (consolidated, fiscal 2015)
- Total assets: ¥ 50 billion (as of March 31, 2015)
- Number of employees: 7,473; 2,506 (Licensed Architects); 2,315 (Licensed Construction Managers); 166 (Licensed Engineers); 111 (Ph.D's)
- Website: www.takenaka.co.jp

Takenaka Corporation (株式会社竹中工務店, Kabushiki-gaisha Takenaka Kōmuten) is one of five major general contractors in Japan. Takenaka provides architectural, engineering, and construction services and has its headquarters located in Chūō-ku, Osaka, Osaka Prefecture. Takenaka has eight domestic offices in Japan with overseas offices in Asia, Europe, and the United States. It has remained under family control since the founding of Takenaka Corporation in 1609, and is currently led by the 17th generation of the family.

The Takenaka corporation designed and built the Takenaka Carpentry Tools Museum.

== About Takenaka ==
In 1610 Tobei Masataka Takenaka (竹中 藤兵衛正高), a shrine and temple carpenter, started a business in Nagoya. The business continued as a family business and built some of the first Western-style buildings in Japan during the last half of 19th century, most of them in Nagoya. In 1899 Toemon Takenaka (竹中 藤右衛門), a 14th generation descendant of the original founder established a branch office in Kobe and founded Takenaka Corporation as an official company.

The company grew during the 20th century; its capital in 1909 was about ¥100,000. This rose to ¥6 million in 1938, ¥1.5 billion in 1959 and ¥50 billion in 1979. Today, Takenaka Corporation is a multinational company with offices in 18 different countries. The current president is Masato Sasaki (since 2019).

The Takenaka Corporation claims to be the oldest operating firms of its type in the world. In 2006 Takenaka acquired competing family architect-carpentry business (Miyadaiku) Kongō Gumi which had been in operation for 1,427 years.

The company is now regarded in Japan as one of the "Big Five" contractors ranked alongside Kajima, Obayashi, Shimizu and Taisei. The firm has built some of the most important buildings in Japan, including the Tokyo Tower, the Tokyo Dome (the first large-scale stadium with an air-supported membrane roof in Japan), the Fukuoka Dome (Japan's first large-scale stadium with a retractable roof), and the Kobe Meriken Park Oriental Hotel among others.

Among its current proposals is the Sky City 1000 project.

Takenaka reconstructed the Suzakumon in Nara.

== History timeline ==
- 1610 (Keicho 15 years) – Takenaka Tobei Masataka, a former vassal of Oda Nobunaga, established a carpentry team in Nagoya. His work mainly involved erecting shrines and temples.
- 1899 (Meiji 32) – Takenaka Tozaemon XIV moved to Kobe, and founded the official company. They built Mitsui Bank Kobe Onohama warehouse.
- 1923 (Taisho 12 years) – the head office in Osaka is moved to Kobe.
- 1935 – Kobe mosque construction.
- 1937 (Showa 12 years) – Established Takenaka Corporation. ¥1.5 million in capital. President Takenaka Tozaemon.
- 1945 – Tozaemon Takenaka appointed as Chairman of the Board and Renichi Takenaka appointed as President.
- 1958 – Tokyo Tower construction.
- 1980 – Takenaka Renichi appointed as Chairman of the Board and Takenaka Toichi appointed as President.
- 1984 – Takenaka Carpentry Tools Museum opened.
- 1988 – Tokyo Dome completed.
- 1993 (Heisei 5 years) – Fukuoka Dome completed, Japan's first roof-retractable multi-purpose stadium
- 1997 – Osaka Dome, Nagoya Dome, International Stadium Yokohama completed.
- 2004 – The Tokyo Main Office moves to new building in Koto-ward in Tokyo.
- 2006 – Midland Square (Nagoya) completed.
- 2007 – Tokyo Midtown, Shin-Marunouchi Building completed.
- 2010 – 400th anniversary of the company.
- 2013 – Masahiro Miyashita becomes president, the first from outside the founding family.

== Technological innovation and R&D ==
Takenaka operates the Takenaka Technical Research Laboratory, which conducts research on construction engineering, including seismic isolation technologies. The company has also reported the integration of Building Information Modeling (BIM) and construction robotics into its projects.

== Sustainability and environmental initiatives ==
The company publishes annual sustainability reports detailing its environmental policies. These include measures to reduce construction waste and the use of low-carbon concrete in specific projects.

== Issues ==
=== Insufficient reinforcement ===
- On November 19, 2007, during the construction of a 27-story (94 meter high) highrise condominium in Minato, Tokyo, the whole 8th and 9th floors of the building had to be dismantled and rebuilt because the reinforcing steel used was of insufficient strength.

=== Industrial accident cover-ups ===
- According to a report of December 28, 2007, a 52-year-old foreman of a Takenaka condominium construction site in Fukushima ward, Osaka, reported an industrial accident in which a falling concrete hose seriously injured a worker of sub-contractor, Airtech Co., Ltd. The accident was reported as having happened at a different demolition site that the foreman was also in charge of. Takenaka and Airtech were issued a summary indictment by the Osaka prosecutor's office for violating the Industrial Safety and Health Act.
- Takenaka also announced on December 19, 2007, that it had failed to report an industrial accident at a Toyota factory it was building in Kariya City, Aichi Prefecture, and that it was under investigation for violation of the Industrial Safety and Health Act.

=== Tax evasion (non-reporting of income) ===
- In March 2013, it was discovered that the Osaka National Tax Office had reprimanded the company for failing to declare about ¥30 million of income (¥9 million of it intentionally) between 2008 and 2011.
- In April 2015, the same office reprimanded the company again for underreporting its income for the four years between 2010 and 2013 by about ¥150 million.

=== Leaky subway ===
- On September 25, 2014, train services at Nagoya Station on the Higashiyama Subway Line were suspended for nine hours due to water leaking into the station as a result of construction work the company was carrying out on the JR Tower Nagoya building.

=== Falling window ===
- On February 17, 2015, a window frame weighing approximately 100 kg fell from the 4th floor of the Kofu City Hall building, which had been built by the company and two other companies. A subsequent investigation by Kofu City found 87 defects in the building. Executives of Takenaka and the other two companies involved, Nihon Sekkei and Sankyo Tateyama, visited the mayor of Kofu on March 20, 2015, to apologize.
- Following these incidents, Takenaka updated its corporate governance guidelines. The company established third-party oversight committees to audit construction safety and revised its subcontractor management policies.

== Selected projects ==
=== Public facilities ===
- Nagoya TV Tower
- Tokyo Tower
- Nippon Budokan
- Kansai-kan of the National Diet Library
- Okinawa Convention Center
- Hankyu Umeda Station
- Kobe Port Tower

=== Commercial facilities ===
- Prada Tokyo (with Herzog and de Meuron)
- Miu Miu Tokyo (with Herzog and de Meuron)
- Maison Hermes (with Renzo Piano)
- Expocity

=== Historic buildings and religious architecture ===
- Suzakumon
- Church of St. Ignatius
- Meiji Seimei Kan
- Seishoji temple
- Imperial Military Academy
- Kobe Union Church

=== Schools ===
- Kwansei Gakuin University UekeHara Campus Mita Campus
- Keio University (Shinanomachi) School of Medicine Integrated Medical Research Building
- Sophia University Building No. 2
- Meiji University Liberty Tower
- Konan University 13 Building
- Kobe Gakuin University Port Island campus
- Kobe International University
- Kansai University Naofumikan
- Kansai University Takatsuki Muse campus
- Kawasaki College of Allied Health Professions gymnasium
- Tokyo University of Science Oshamambe campus

=== Sports stadiums ===
- Tokyo Dome
- Osaka Dome
- Sapporo Dome
- Fukuoka Dome
- Nagoya Dome
- International Stadium Yokohama
- Okayama Prefecture athletics stadium Momotaro Stadium
- Ibaraki Prefectural Kashima Soccer Stadium

=== Office buildings ===
- Abenobashi Terminal Building – Harukas tallest building in Japan, design collaboration with César Pelli
- Midland Square
- Shin-Marunouchi Building
- Tokyo Midtown
- Crystal Tower
- The Landmark Nagoya Sakae
- TV Asahi new headquarters
- Umeda Hankyu Building
- Kobe Hankyu Building
- Tokyo Shiodome Building
- Second Yoshimoto Building
- Shin Umeda City, Umeda Sky Building
- Nippon Club Tower
- Tokyo Sankei Building
- Pacific Century Place Marunouchi
- Chuo Mitsui Trust and Banking Co., Ltd. Head Office Building
- Nintendo headquarters building
- Kikkoman Noda headquarters
- Kyocera headquarters building
- Tokyo Opera City
- Morita headquarters building
- Asahi Broadcasting Corporation building (firefly town) Asahi Broadcasting Corporation old building, Osaka Tower, Hotel Plaza demolition
- Audio-Technica new Headquarters
- CapitaGreen, Singapore

=== Museums and theme parks ===
- 21st Century Museum of Contemporary Art, Kanazawa, Kanazawa (with SANAA)
- Sagawa Art Museum
- Museum of Contemporary Art, Tokyo
- Otsuka Museum of Art
- MOA Museum of Art
- Ikuo Hirayama Museum of Art
- Pola Museum of Art
- Izumi City Kubo Sou Memorial Museum of Art
- Tempozan Harbor Village, Kaiyukan
- Shima Spain Village
- Takenaka Carpentry Tools Museum

=== Dwellings ===
- Kuzunoha Tower City
- Moto-Azabu Hills
- Rokko Island City, "East Court 11 Avenue"
- Elsa Tower 55
- Tennozu View Tower
- CapitaGreen (with Toyo Ito)
- Toranomon Hills residential tower (with ingenhoven associates)

=== Plants and research laboratories ===
- Suntory World Research Center
- Zeria Pharmaceutical Tsukuba Plant
- Toyota Industries Corporation Information Technology Institute
- Nichia headquarters third research building
- Tateyama brewing headquarters factory
- Sanyo Denki Technology Center
- Yanmar Diesel Co., Ltd. Biwa Plant
- Stanley Electric Hatano new Building 2

=== Hotels ===
- Kobe Meriken Park Oriental Hotel
- Kanazawa Manten Hotel Station

=== Hospitals ===
- Jichi Medical University Hospital New Building
- Kawasaki Medical School Hospital West Wing Building
- Kyushu University Hospital South Tower
- Kitasato University Hospital new building

== See also ==
- Nippon Club (New York)
