= Marunouchi Building =

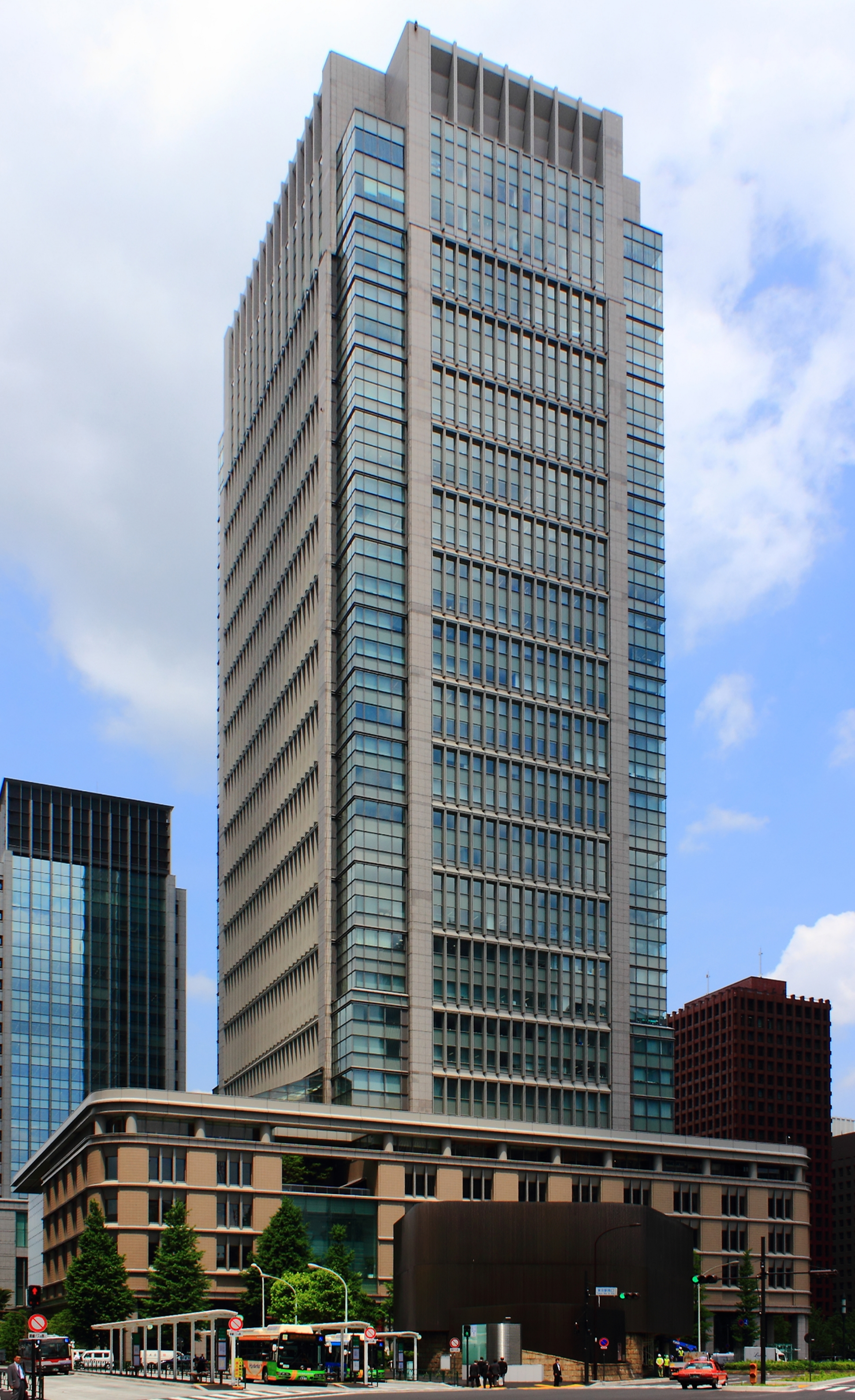
- Interactive map of the Marunouchi Building area

General information
- Status: Completed
- Coordinates: 35°40′51.7″N 139°45′49.6″E
- Completed: 2002

Height
- Height: 180 m (590 ft)

Technical details
- Floor count: 37

The Marunouchi Building (丸の内ビルディング) is a skyscraper located in Marunouchi, Tokyo, Japan. Construction of the 180-metre, 37-story skyscraper was finished in 2002.

== History ==
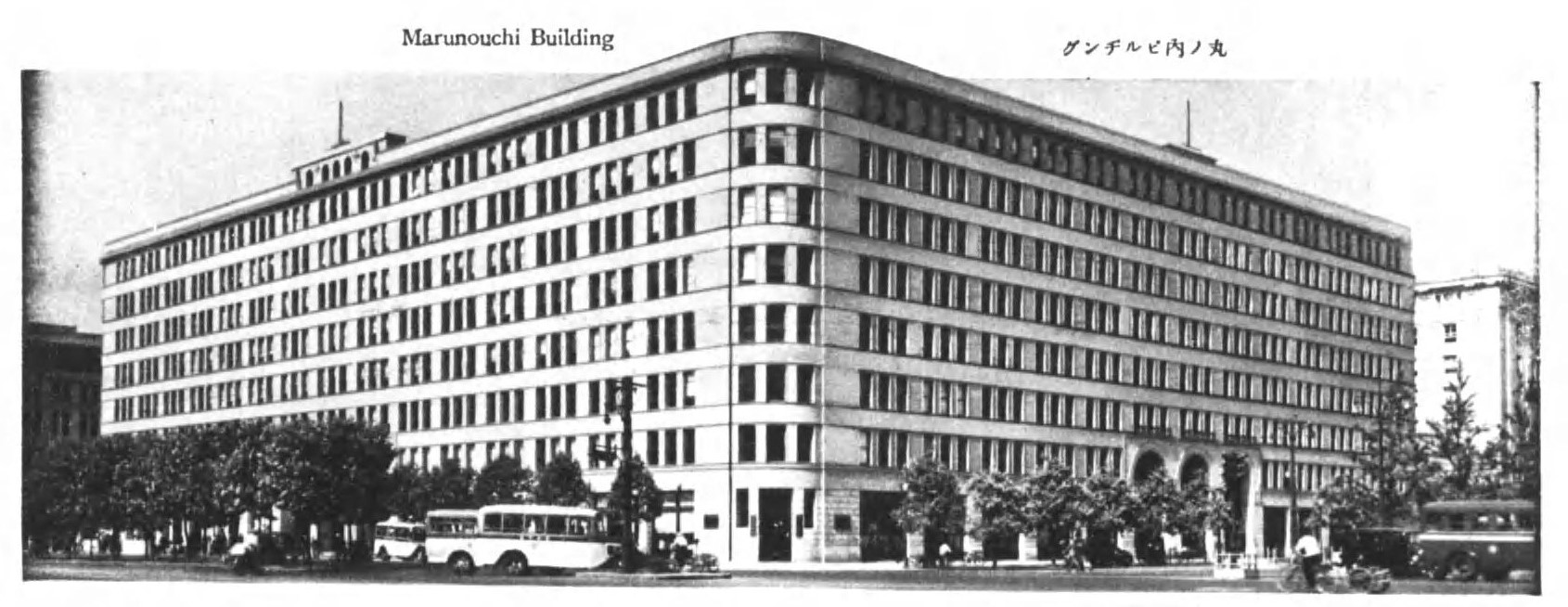
The Marunouchi Building in 1936

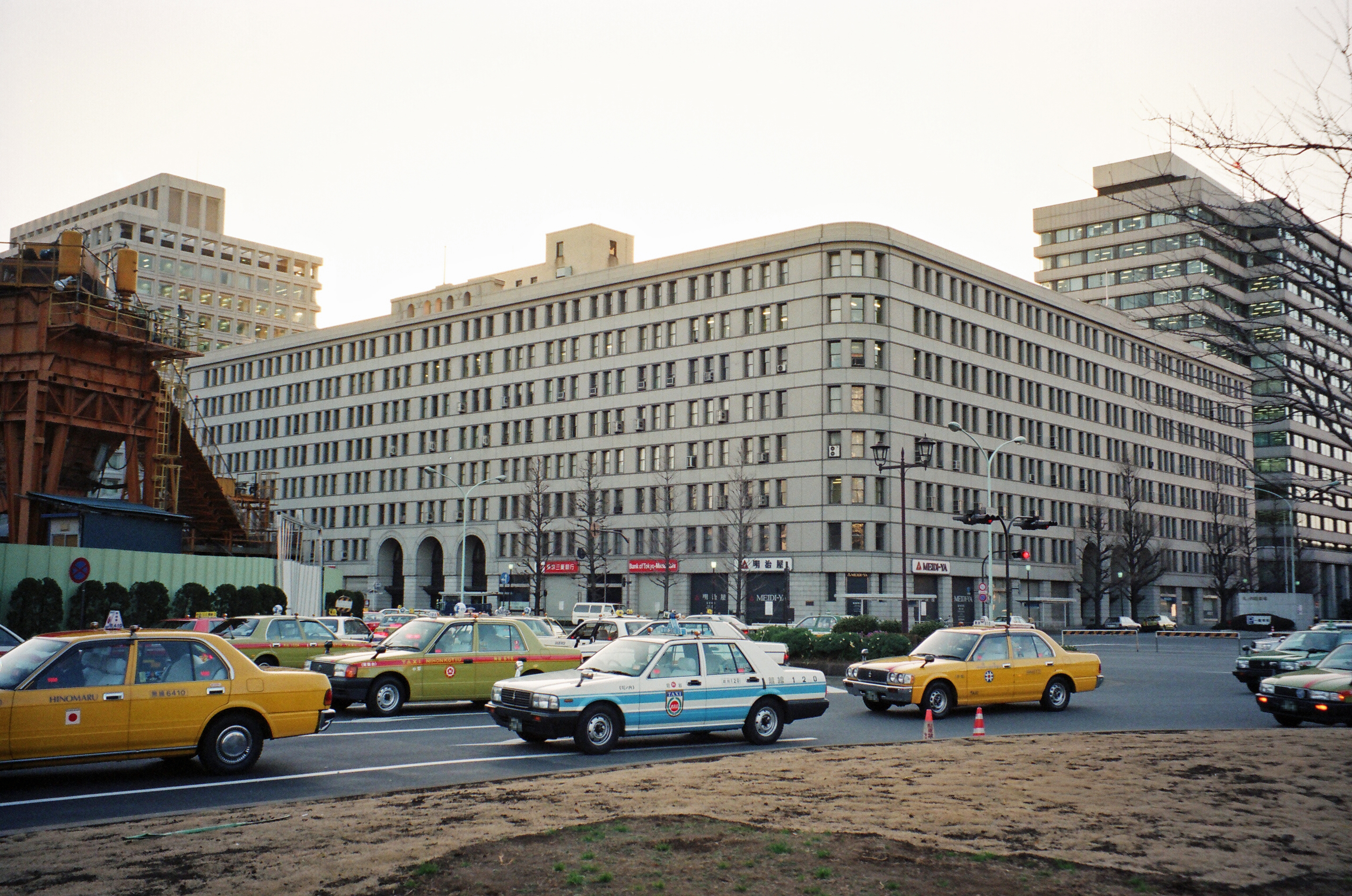
The Marunouchi Building in 1997

In 1923, a nine-storey building was built on the site. The building survived both the Great Kantō Earthquake and the bombings of Tokyo during the Second World War. With a total floor area of over 60,000 square metres, it was the largest office building in Asia when it was completed.

The old building was closed in 1997 and replaced by the current 180-metre structure in 2002. One of the porticos from the old building has been preserved as part of the new building.

== Tenants ==
- 1st basement: retail stores, cafes, restaurants, printing & copying store and banks (ATMs)
- 1st floor: retail stores, cafe and restaurants
- 2nd and 3rd floors: retail stores
- 4th floor: retail stores, hair salons, cafe, etc.
- 5th and 6th floors: restaurants
- 7th, 9th, and 10th floors: Nagoya University of Commerce and Business Graduate School of Management
- 10th floor: Business areas
- 15th - 18th floors: Deloitte Tohmatsu Consulting
- 19th - 22nd floors: Bloomberg
- 23rd floor: Advantest
- 24th floor: Visa International
- 25th floor: NGK Insulators Tokyo Headquarters
- 27th floor: Tenqoo Restaurant
- 27th and 28th floor: Intelligence
- 29th floor: IBIDEN Tokyo Branch
- 33rd Floor: AlixPartners, Greenhill & Co.
- 34th floor: Treasure Data
- 35th and 36th floors: restaurants
