= Pacific Century Place Marunouchi =

Building in Tokyo, Japan

Coordinates: 35°40′41″N 139°46′01″E

- パシフィックセンチュリープレイス丸の内
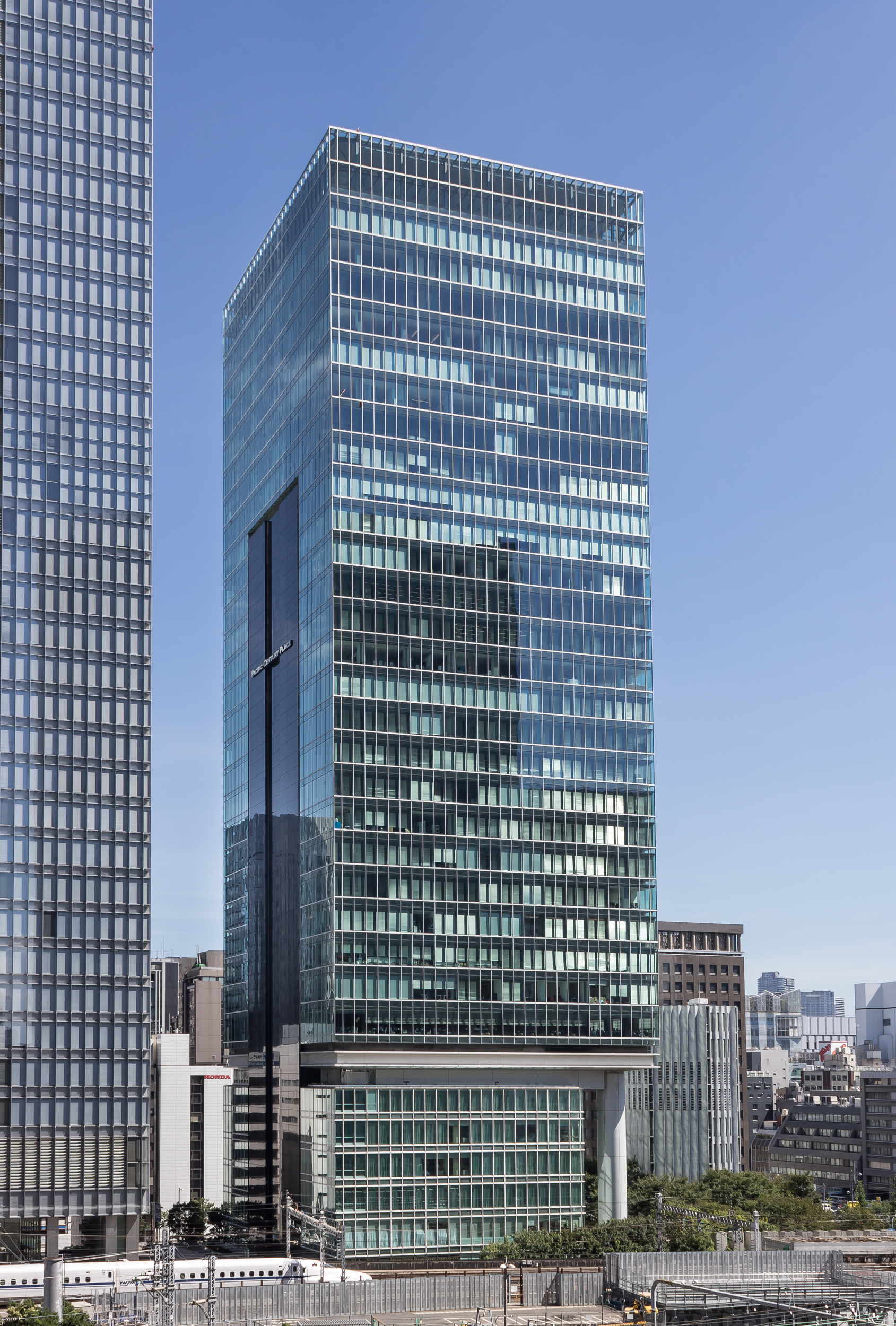
- Interactive map of the Pacific Century Place Marunouchi area

General information
- Status: Completed
- Construction started: 1999
- Completed: 2001

Pacific Century Place Marunouchi (パシフィックセンチュリープレイス丸の内, Pashifikku Senchurī Pureisu Marunouchi) is a skyscraper in Marunouchi, Chiyoda, Tokyo.

The Four Seasons Hotel Tokyo at Marunouchi is within the building. The building also houses Aeroméxico's Japan offices.

The building was developed following a tender of the underlying land by Japan Railway Settlement Corporation in 1997. Pacific Century Group acquired the land and led the development of the property. Nikken Sekkei was responsible for preliminary architectural design, while Takenaka Corporation and Kajima Corporation led the construction.

Singaporean sovereign wealth fund GIC acquired a large portion of the building in 2014 (excluding the hotel and certain other components) for $1.7 billion from Secured Capital Investment Management, which acquired the space in 2009 for around $1.3 billion.
