= Shin-Marunouchi Building =

Skyscraper in Japan

Shin Marunouchi Building
- 新丸の内ビルディング
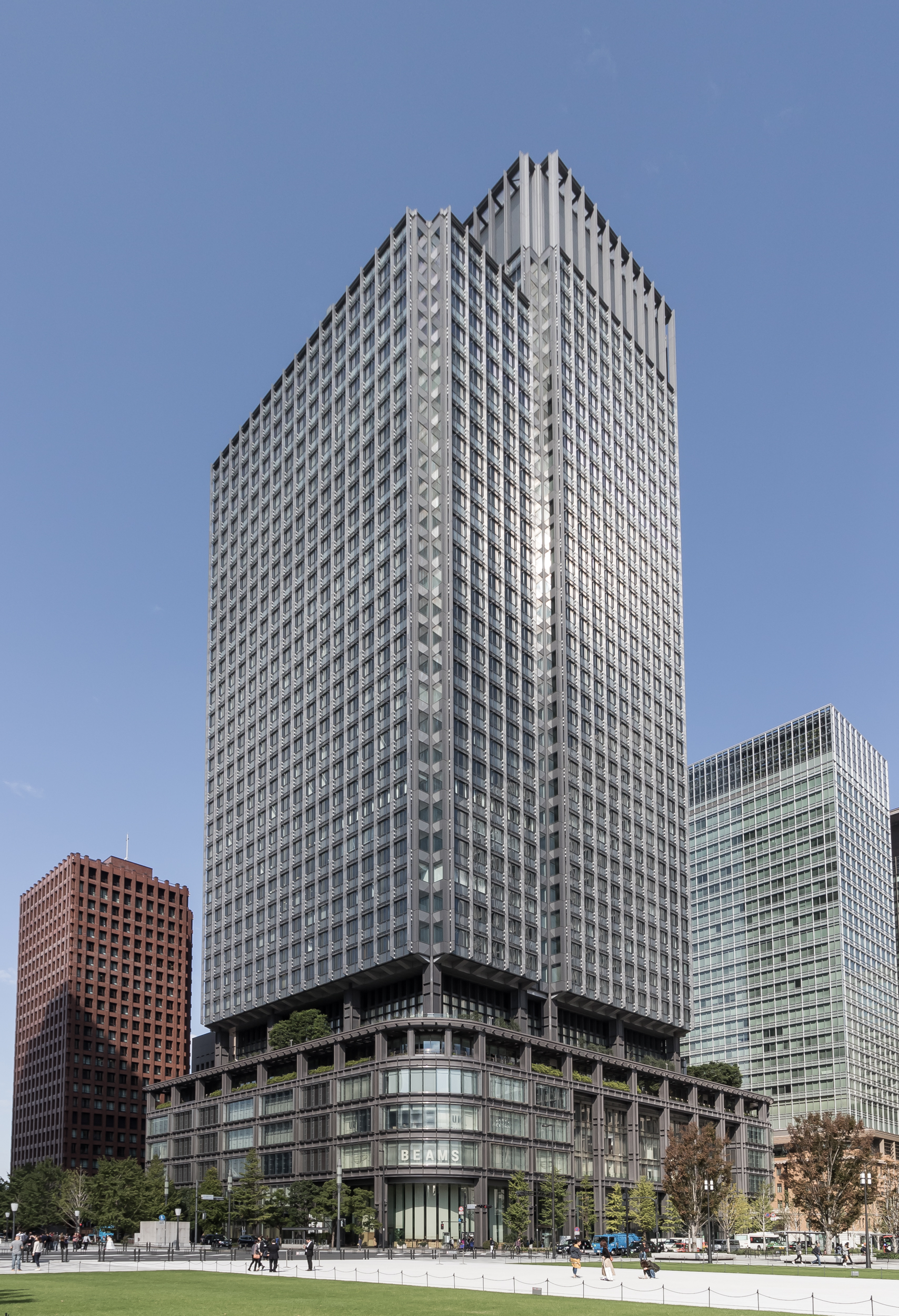
- Interactive map of the Shin Marunouchi Building area

General information
- Status: Completed
- Type: Offices and restaurants
- Location: Chiyoda, Tokyo, Japan
- Coordinates: 35.68255°N 139.764373°E
- Completed: 2007
- Opening: April 2007
- Owner: Mitsubishi Estate

Height
- Antenna spire: 197.6 m (648 ft)
- Top floor: 38

Technical details
- Floor count: 42 (38 above ground, 4 underground)
- Floor area: 195,490 m^{2} (2,104,200 sq ft)

Design and construction
- Architect: Sir Michael Hopkins
- Structural engineer: Mitsubishi Jisho Sekkei Inc.
- Main contractor: Takenaka Corporation

The Shin Marunouchi Building (新丸の内ビルディング, Shin Marunouchi Birudingu), or New Inner Circle Building, is a 198 m (650 ft) high-rise building in Chiyoda ward in Tokyo, directly across from Tokyo Central Station. The building was completed on April 19, 2007, and opened to the public on April 27, 2007. It is often called "Shin Maru Biru" for short.

== Overview ==
The previous eight story high Shin Marunouchi Building (新丸ノ内ビルヂング, Shin Marunouchi Birujingu) was built there in 1952. The construction work of the current building began on March 15, 2005, and the building was one of the commercial complex buildings in Marunouchi Manhattan Plan, a redevelopment project in the Marunouchi area, following to the Marunouchi OAZO and the Tokyo Building TOKIA. The building was designed by Hopkins Architects of London.

The building contains office floors, and 153 stores are housed in total. The total construction cost was about 90 billion yen, and constructed by the Takenaka Corporation. The building was designed by British architect Sir Michael Hopkins, who won the Special Award of the Civic Trust Award for Sustainability in 2002.

The basement floor connects to Tokyo Central Station, as well as other nearby buildings.

The building was used as a fictional office building called "carrier man tradings" in Aggretsuko.
