= Scroll on the Comparative Merits of Sake and Rice =

Japanese emaki from the 16th century depicting a debate on the merits of sake and rice

- Japanese: 酒飯論絵巻, Shuhanron emaki
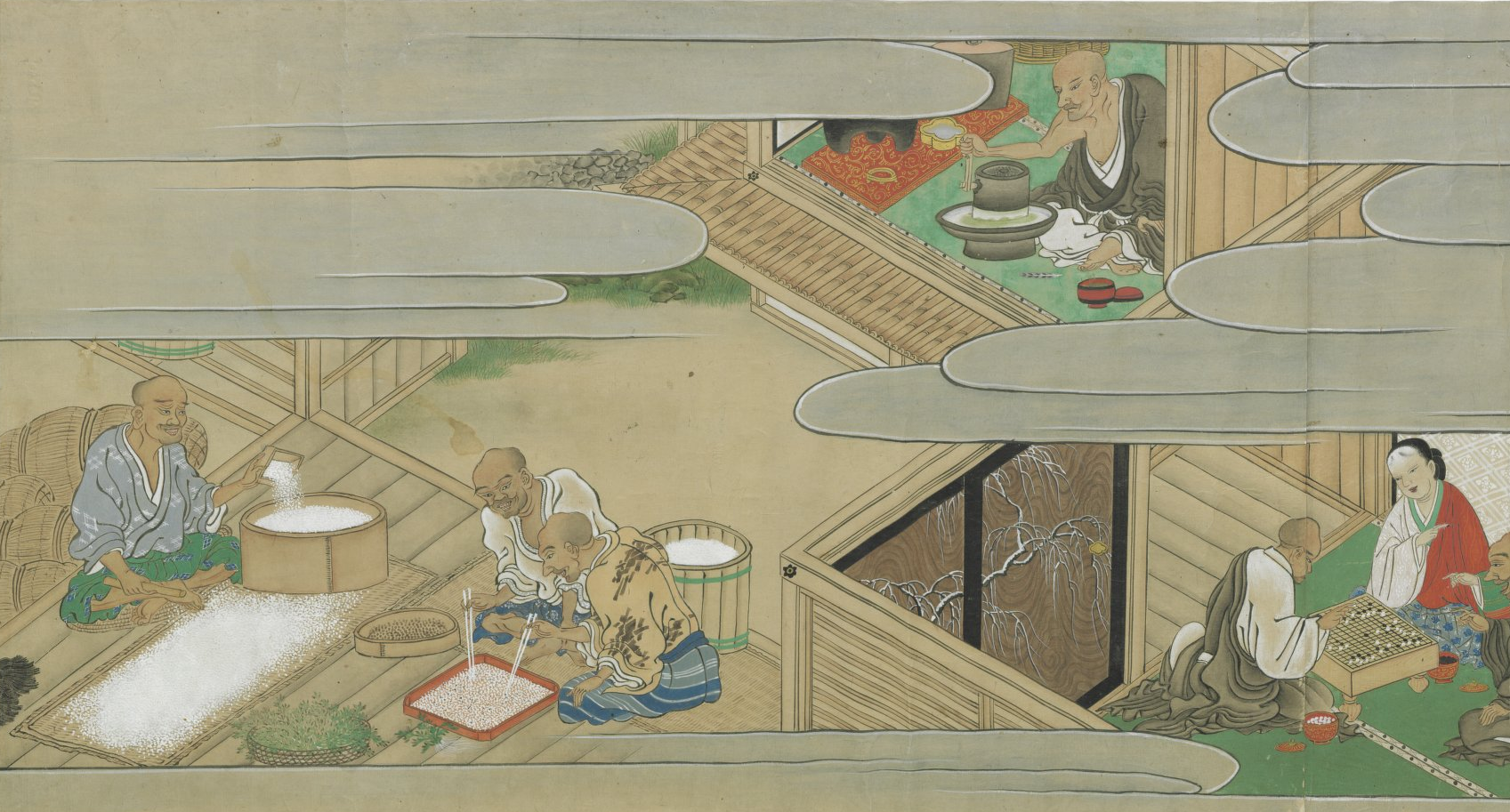
- Detail of scene 1: the preparation of tea and sorting of rice for the banquet, while guests play go in the bottom right.
- Artist: Kanō Motonobu, Tosa Mitsumoto
- Completion date: 16th century
- Medium: Painting and ink on a paper scroll
- Dimensions: 1,416 cm × 30.7 cm (557 in × 12.1 in)
- Location: Tokyo National Museum, Tokyo

The Scroll on the Comparative Merits of Sake and Rice (Japanese: 酒飯論絵巻; Shuhanron emaki) is a Japanese emaki dating from the 16th century, of which several versions or copies survive. The work recounts a quarrel during a banquet among three characters about the superiority of rice, sake, and diversity. It serves as a valuable iconographic document on cuisine and table manners in Japan during the Muromachi period.

== Context ==
Imported to Japan from around the 6th century through exchanges with the Chinese Empire, the practice of emaki became widespread among the aristocracy during the Heian period. These are long paper scrolls narrating a story to the reader through text and paintings. The reader discovers the narrative by gradually unrolling the scrolls with one hand while re-rolling them with the other, from right to left (following the Japanese writing direction), so that only a portion of text or image, about sixty centimeters, is visible at a time.

The art of emaki experienced a golden age from the 12th to the 14th centuries, then lost its vigor and originality, although production remained significant within the main painting schools during the Muromachi period. The oldest versions of the Scroll on the Comparative Merits of Sake and Rice date from this period of artistic decline and classicism in the art of emaki.

== Theme ==
The versions of the Scroll on the Comparative Merits of Sake and Rice consist of several scenes of banquets and cooking, where the painting accompanies the text in kana. The scenes depict a debate at the table among three characters—a noble, a monk, and a warrior—about the merits of rice alcohol (sake) compared to rice itself: the monk prefers rice, the noble prefers sake, and the warrior, the host of the banquet, appreciates both. After an introduction, each character successively praises their preference in a section of the emaki, for a total of four sections (the order varies by version). This form of debate with three viewpoints, one of which is intermediary, is ancient in Japanese and Chinese theology and literature

This debate, according to several scholars, references a religious quarrel among three Buddhist schools during the Muromachi period: Nichiren, Jōdo Shinshū, and Tendai, the latter teaching the Middle Way (Madhyâmaka), or mediation. This ideological conflict led to a surge of violence in the imperial capital, already affected by famines and civil wars. The Scroll on the Comparative Merits of Sake and Rice does not depict these violences, but the author clearly advocates for the intermediary path (the Tendai position) in the final scene, painting all the characters eating and drinking together in moderation. The author highlights, in contrast, the excesses of drinking, drunkenness, and the austerity induced by the complete absence of alcohol

The final scene, full of splendor, abundance, and conviviality, appears utopian in the context of the late Muromachi period, depicting an idealized moment of life as envisioned by the painter.

== Different versions ==
Around twenty or thirty versions of the emaki survive today, but the first historical version, generally attributed to Kanō Motonobu (1476–1559), has disappeared. The various copies can be classified into two branches: one linked to the Kanō school and the other to the Tosa school, the two main painting schools of the country at the time. Among the surviving versions, the oldest from the Kanō branch is sometimes attributed to Kanō Motonobu, though this is uncertain and contested, while the oldest version from the Tosa school is attributed, based on its colophon, to Tosa Mitsumoto (1530–1569). The oldest surviving version, from the Kanō branch, is currently held by the Agency for Cultural Affairs (Bunkachō) and stored at the Tokyo National Museum. The work dates from the 16th century (Muromachi period) and consists of a single paper scroll measuring 30.7 centimetres (12.1 in) in height and 1,416 centimetres (557 in) in length

While the pictorial style varies between versions, the text, narrative, and scene composition remain relatively consistent. The four scenes of the scrolls are generally divided into two parts, depicting the banquet and the preparation of dishes and drinks in the kitchen. The paintings reflect the beginnings or origins of genre painting in the Edo period (fūzokuga), while inheriting traditional emaki painting techniques, notably the use of a high vantage point that allows interior scenes to be painted without depicting the roof or front wall of buildings (fukinuki yatai). It is likely that the Scroll on the Comparative Merits of Sake and Rice served as a model for banquet scenes in more significant emaki, such as the Taiheiki emaki, and as a learning tool for young painters

The main institutions holding a copy of the Scroll on the Comparative Merits of Sake and Rice include the Agency for Cultural Affairs (exhibited at the Tokyo National Museum), the National Diet Library, the library of Waseda University (black-and-white illustrated book), Kyoto University, the Seikadō Bunko Art Museum, the National Library of France, the British Museum, the Chester Beatty Library in Dublin, the Ehime Prefecture Museum of History and Culture, and the New York Public Library.

According to a French study, the copy held by the National Library of France is one of the most refined and faithful to the original, distinguished by its attention to detail, fluid and sharp ink lines, flat color contrasts, and the use of mist to highlight the main characters.

== Historiography ==
The emaki is a significant source of interest for the art of table manners and festivities in late Muromachi period Japan: the conduct of receptions, foods, drinks, drunkenness, etc., leading to numerous studies on this topic. The variety and precision of the dishes and drinks make it "one of the most detailed visual sources on the culinary culture of the Muromachi period" according to some specialists. Like most emaki, the work depicts characters from all social classes—monks, warriors, nobles, servants—with realism and sometimes humor, such as the drunken warrior vomiting to rejoin the feast and continue drinking

== Gallery ==
The images below are from the version held by the National Library of France, painted in the style of the Kanō school.

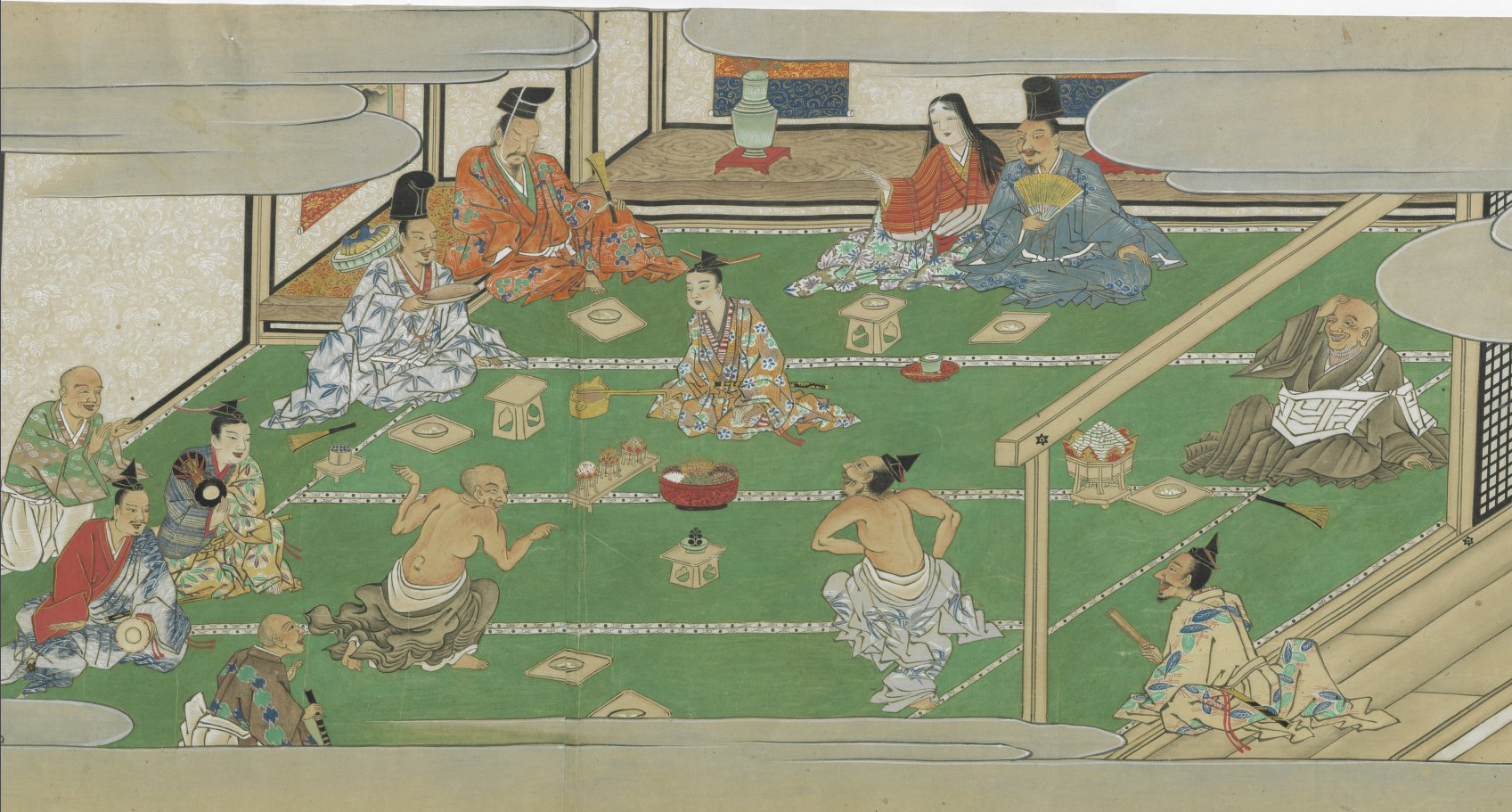
Scene 2: part of the banquet where the noble defends the merits of sake and conviviality.

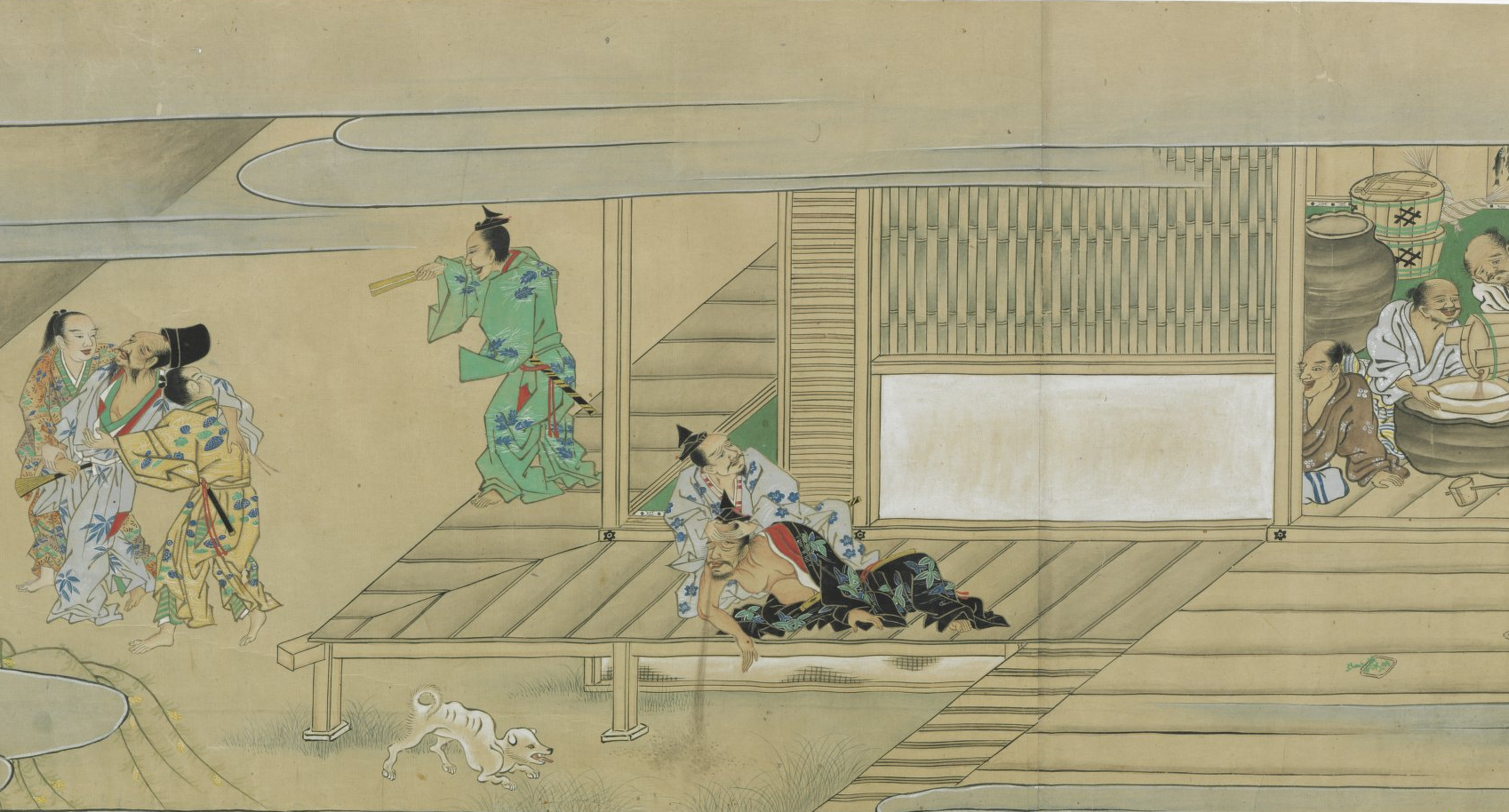
Scene 2: preparation of sake and drunkenness.

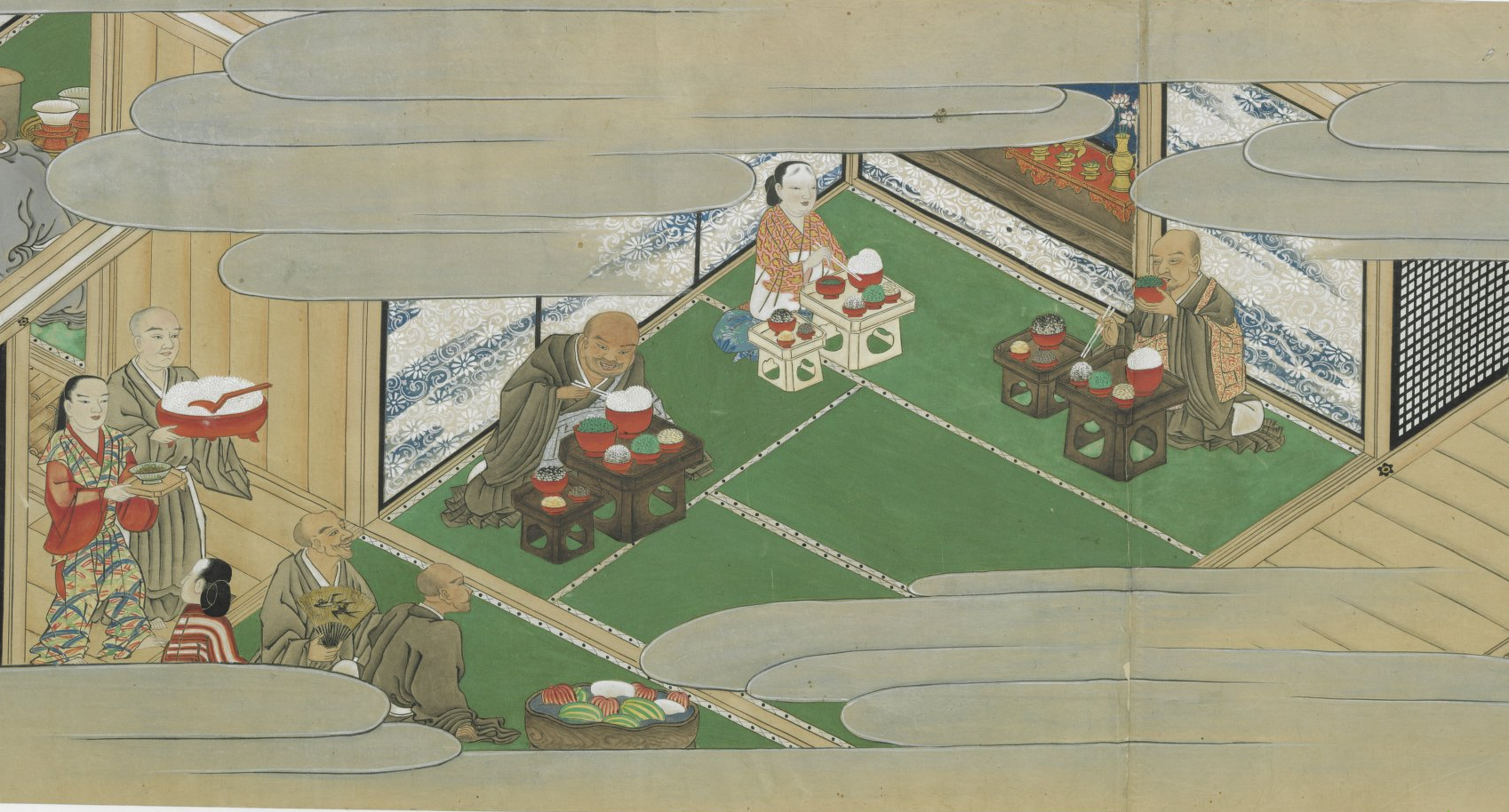
Scene 3: part of the banquet where the noble defends the merits of rice and abundance.

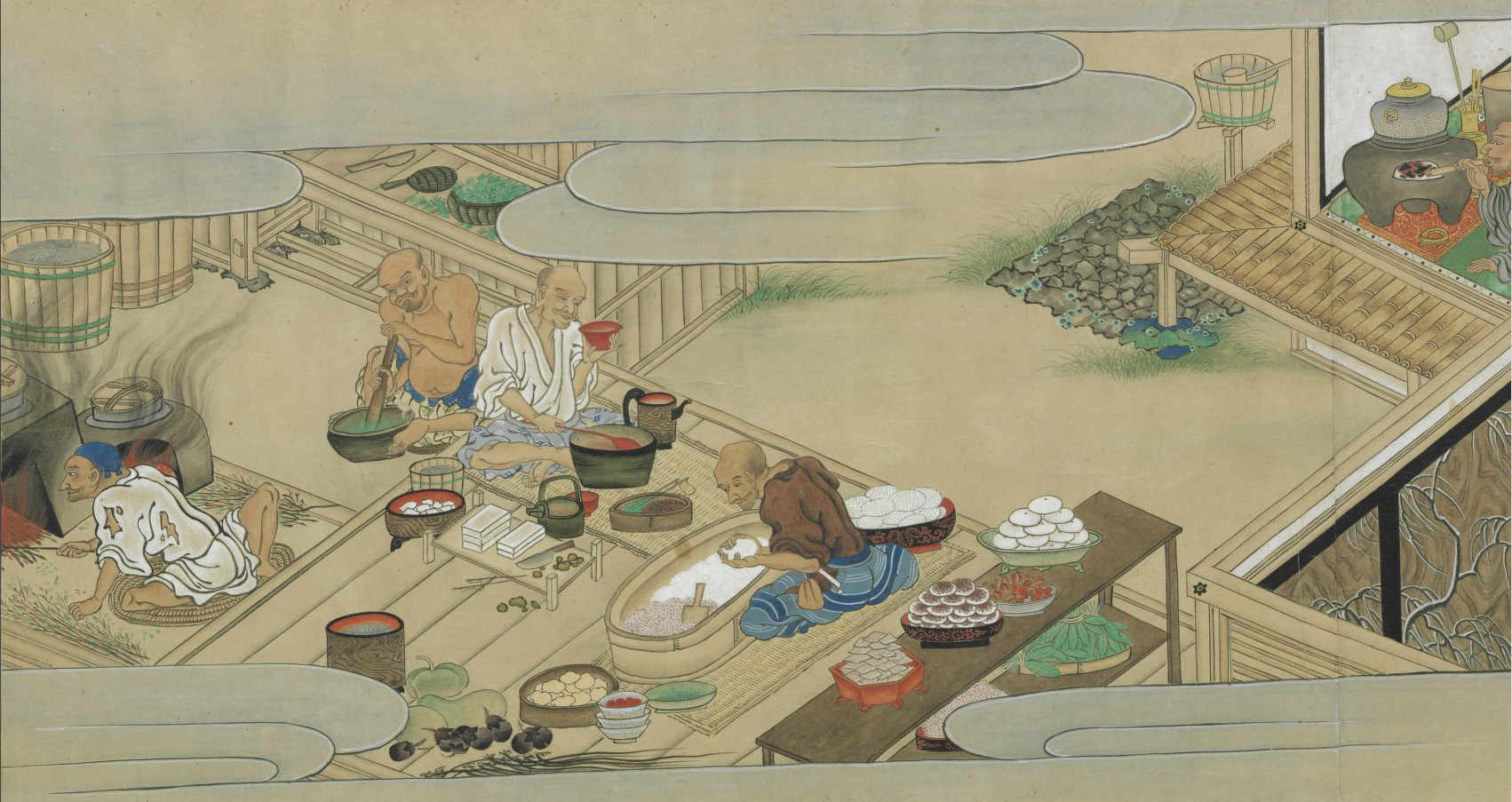
Scene 3: cooking numerous dishes made from rice.

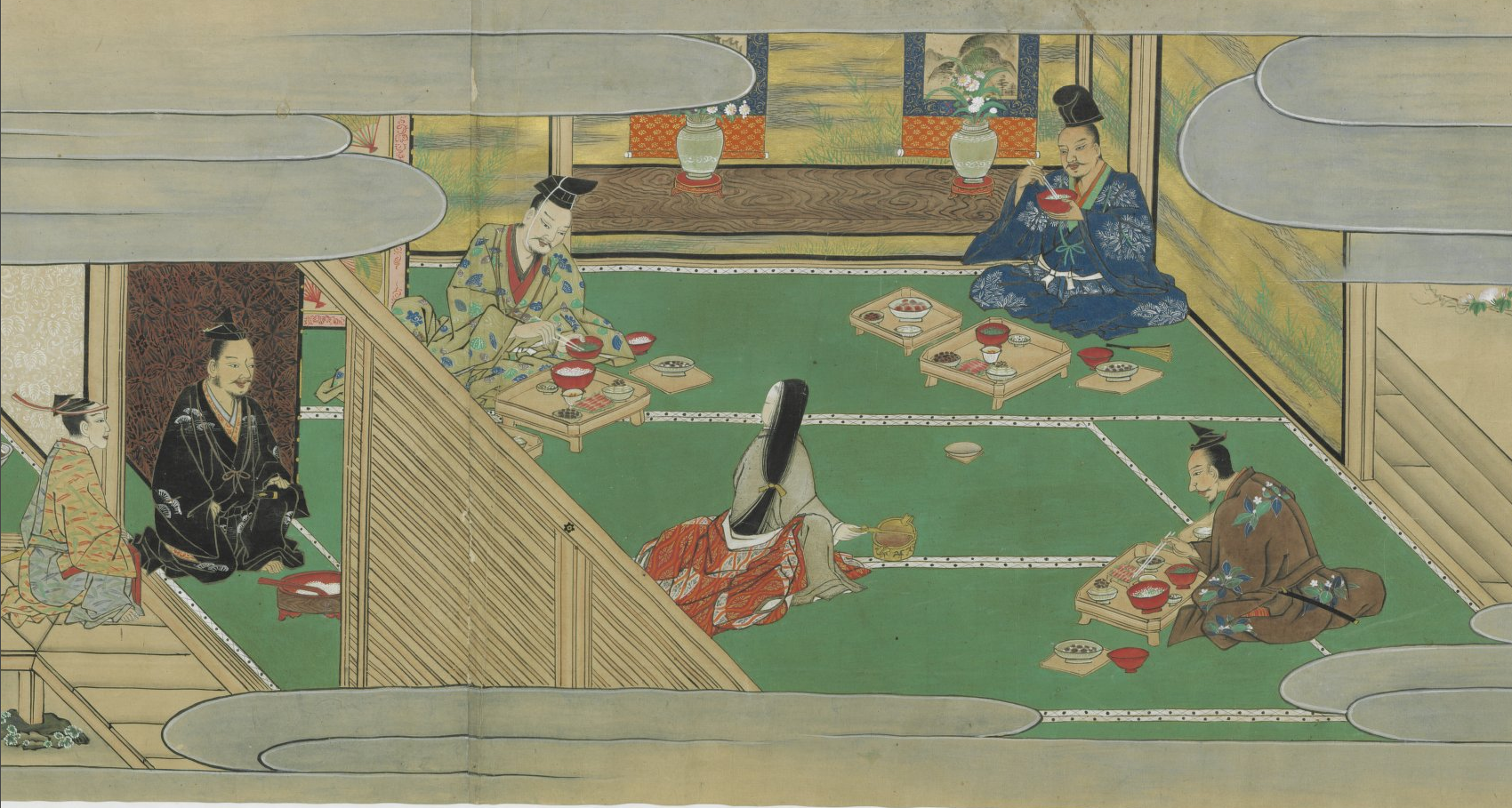
Scene 4: part of the banquet where the warrior defends the Middle Way.

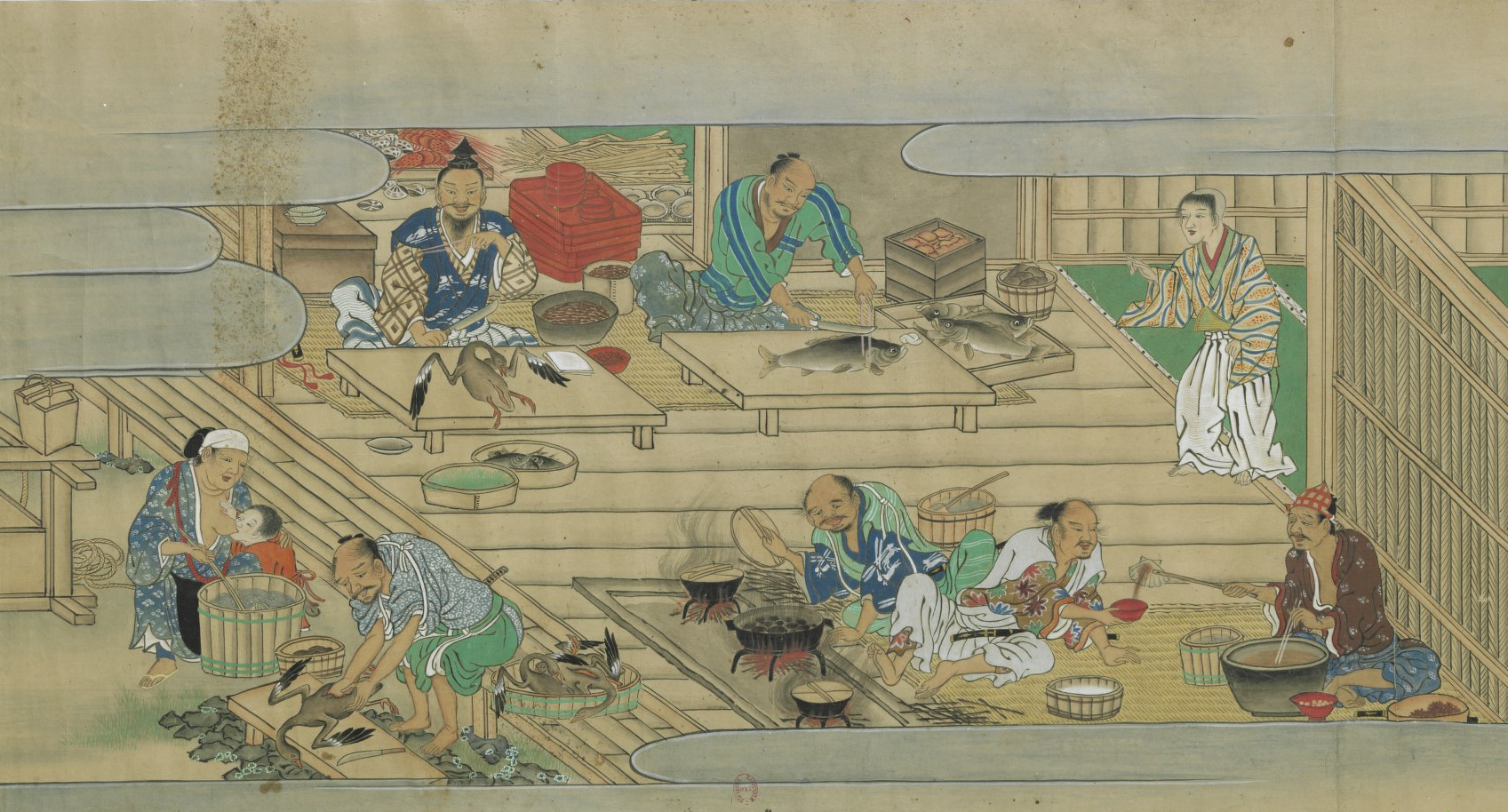
Scene 4: cooking various dishes made from meat, fish, crustaceans, and vegetables.

== Bibliography ==
- Brisset, Claire-Akiko; Leggeri-Bauer, Estelle; Béranger, Véronique (2014). Des mérites comparés du saké et du riz illustré par un rouleau japonais du 17th century [The Comparative Merits of Sake and Rice Illustrated by a 17th-Century Japanese Scroll] (in French). Paris: Diane de Selliers and National Library of France. p. 248. ISBN 978-2-36437-039-5. Archived from the original on 2015-06-26.
- Brisset, Claire-Akiko (2014). "La Disputation sur le saké et le riz (Shuhanron emaki): une controverse parodique dans le Japon médiéval" [The Debate on Sake and Rice (Shuhanron emaki): A Parodic Controversy in Medieval Japan]. L'Atelier du Centre de Recherches Historiques (in French). 12 (12). doi:10.4000/acrh.5937.
