= Mitsubishi Ichigokan Museum, Tokyo =

Mitsubishi Ichigokan Museum, Tokyo 三菱一号館美術館

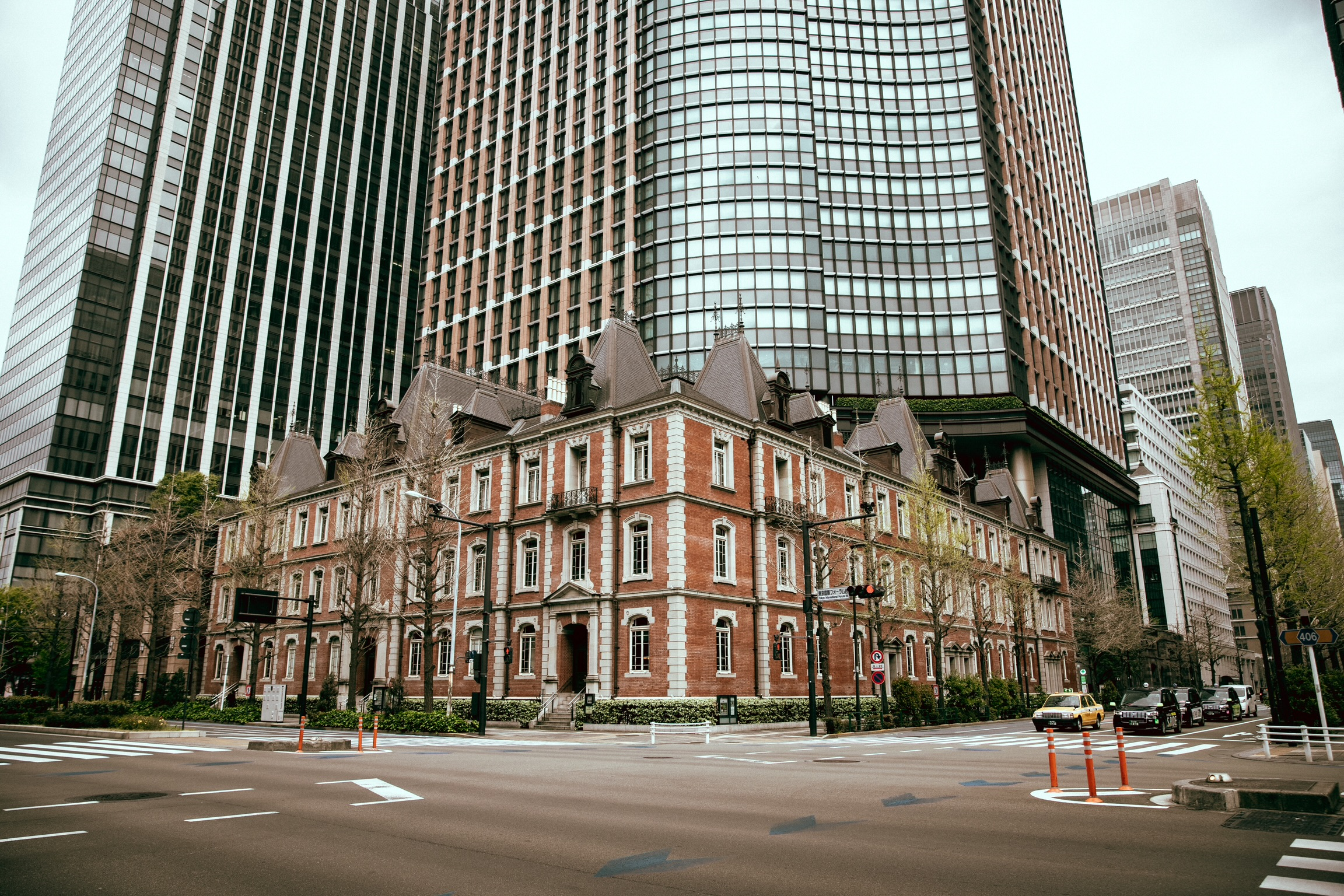
- Street level view of Mitsubishi Ichigokan Museum, Tokyo as of April 2023

- Location within Tokyo Yamanote Loop Location within Tokyo wards area
- Established: April 6, 2010
- Location: Marunouchi area of Chiyoda, Tokyo, Japan
- Coordinates: 35.678355°N 139.763255°E
- Type: Art museum
- Director: Akiya Takahashi
- Owner: Mitsubishi Group
- Public transit access: Chiyoda Line - Nijubashimae, Marunouchi Line - Tokyo Station, JR Lines - Tokyo Station
- Website: English - Japanese

The Mitsubishi Ichigokan Museum, Tokyo (三菱一号館美術館, Mitsubishi Ichigōkan Bijutsukan) is an art museum in Tokyo's Marunouchi district.

== History ==
The building is a faithful recreation of the original Mitsubishi Ichigokan which stood on the same location. Originally completed in 1894 and designed by British architect Josiah Conder, the building was torn down in 1968. The construction company responsible for the current incarnation used portions of the original plans and materials used at the time of the original construction. The new building, built out of red brick and cast concrete, has three stories above ground and two stories below.

== Museum ==
Construction of the museum was completed in 2009 and it was opened April 6, 2010. The museum includes approximately 800 square metres (8,600 sq ft) of exhibition space, spread over 20 rooms, throughout the building's 6,000 square metres (65,000 sq ft) floorplan.

The museum focuses on 19th-century Western artwork. Included in the museum's own artwork is the Maurice Joyant collection, a group of over 200 works by Henri Toulouse-Lautrec. The theme of the opening exhibition will be "Manet and Modern Paris", in cooperation with Musée d'Orsay. An opening commemoration exhibition and logo design were announced in 2008.

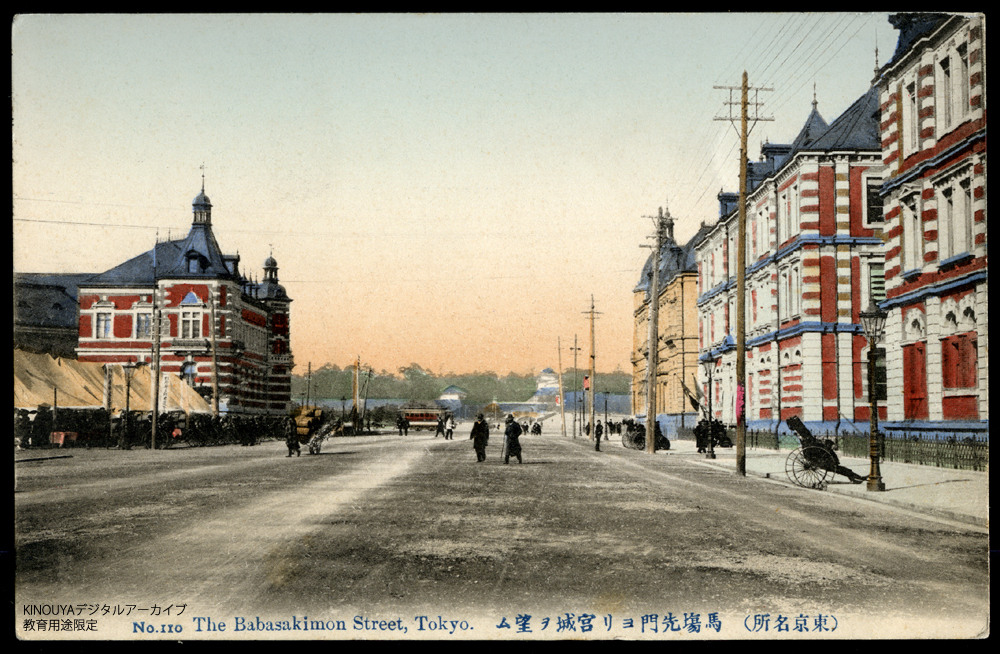
Late Meiji era view of Babasaki-dori Avenue

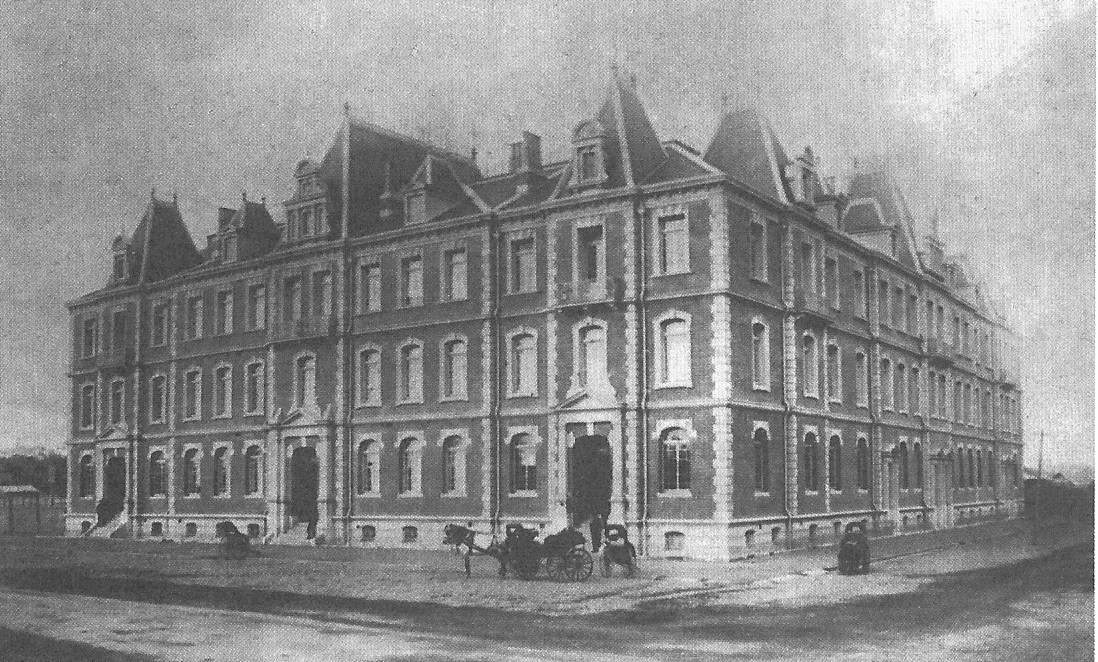
The original Mitsubishi Ichigokan

The Museum does not currently exhibit its permanent collection and holds only special exhibitions.

== Publications ==
The museum has published a number of books about its special exhibitions, including the following:

- Ukiyo-e: Floating world from the Saito Collection (2013)
- Intimate Impressionism from the National Gallery of Art, Washington (2015)
- Kyosai: Master painter and his student Josiah Conder (2015)
- Paris Haute Couture (2016)
- Leonardo da Vinci e Michelangelo (2017)
- Impressionism and Beyond: Master paintings from the Yoshino Gypsum Collection (2019)
- 1894 Visions: Odilon Redon and Henri de Toulouse-Lautrec (2020)
- From Kiyochika to Hasui: Ukiyo-e and Shin-Hanga Woodblock Prints from the Smithsonian's National Museum of Asian Art (2026)

== See also ==
- Meiji Seimei Kan
- Marunouchi
- Mitsubishi Estate Co., Ltd.
