= Okada Shinichirō =

Japanese architect

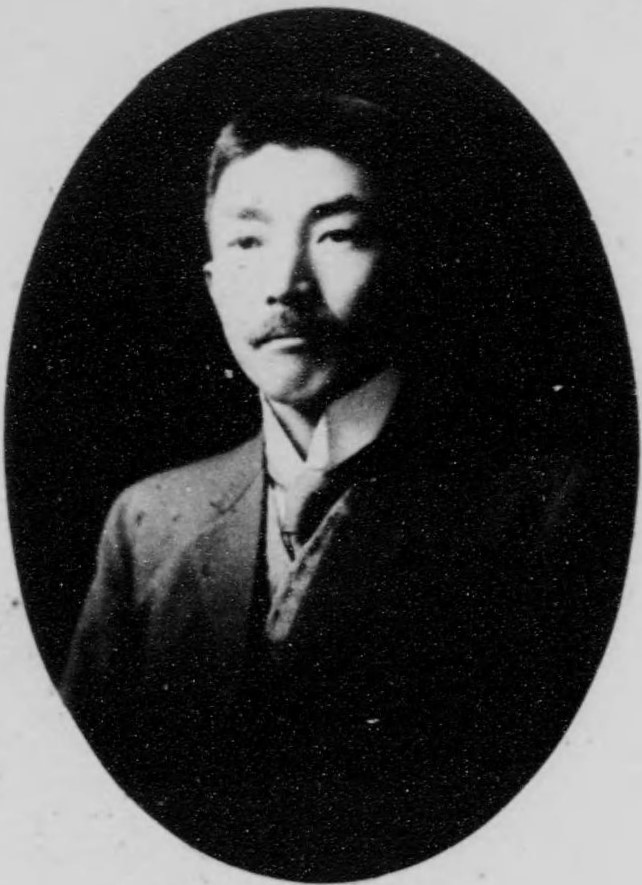
- Okada Shin'ichiro
- Born: 20 November 1883
- Died: 4 April 1932 (aged 48)
- Occupation: Architect

Okada Shinichirō (岡田信一郎) (20 November 1883 – 4 April 1932) was a prominent Japanese architect who practiced in the early twentieth century. Okada taught at Waseda University and Tokyo School of Fine Arts.

While he was well-known for tendency for European styles, he also produced work in the Imperial Crown style (帝冠様式, Teikanyōshiki). One example is the Biwako Otsukan in Yanagasaki Lakeside Park, Shiga Prefecture.

== Biography ==
On November 20, 1883 Okada was born in Tokyo. In 1900 he graduated from a middle school attached to the Normal School, which is now Tsukuba University secondary school/high school. He graduated from Daiichi High School in 1903 and entered the Tokyo Institute of Technology Technical University. He graduated from university in 1906.

After graduation Okada became a lecturer at Tokyo School of Fine Arts. In 1911 he became a lecturer at Waseda University, and became a full professor a year later in 1912. In 1923 he became a full professor at Tokyo School of Fine Arts.

Okada won the first prize in a design competition for the Osaka City Central Public Hall in 1917. He designed the Tokyo Metropolitan Art Museum, a European classicist building with entrances on all four sides, which opened on 1 May 1926. He also designed Meiji Seimei Kan, which was completed posthumously in 1934.

Okada died on April 4, 1932.

== Selected works ==
- Komatsu Miyauchi Hinoshito statue pedestal base (1912)
- Bank of Japan Otaru Branch (1912) (currently a Financial Museum)
- Osaka City Central Public Hall (1917) Designed by Tatsuno Kataoka, based on Okada's original plan.
- Osaka Takashimaya (1921) Remodeled after war damage, demolished in 2007.
- Hatoyama Ichiro House ( 1924 ) Currently Hatoyama Kaikan.
- Kabukiza (1924) Restored after war damage but demolished in 2010.
- Aoyama Kaikan (1924). Constructed at the site of the residence of Suzumori Su-Feng.
- Tokyo Metropolitan Art Museum ( 1926 ). Demolished after the completion of the present museum.
- Tokyo Prefectural First Higher Girls' School (1927).
- Kokokuin Bago (1927) Kanoeiji Temple.
- Kamakura National Treasure Hall (1928): The temple shrine of Kamakura was heavily damaged by the Great Kanto Earthquake and was re-built.
- Kuroda Memorial Hall (1928):(黒田記念館)
- Tokyo Prefectural First Junior High School (1929). Current municipal Hibiya High School.
- Tokyo Art School Showroom (1929) Current Tokyo National University of Fine Arts and Sciences Department of Art College Showroom.
- Nikolaito repair (1930) of design by Mikhail Stichlupov.
- Hakuhodo (1930) Former headquarter building of the advertising agency. Demolished in 2010.
- Meiji Life Museum (1934)
- Lake Biwa Hotel (1934) Present Biwako Otsu pavilion.
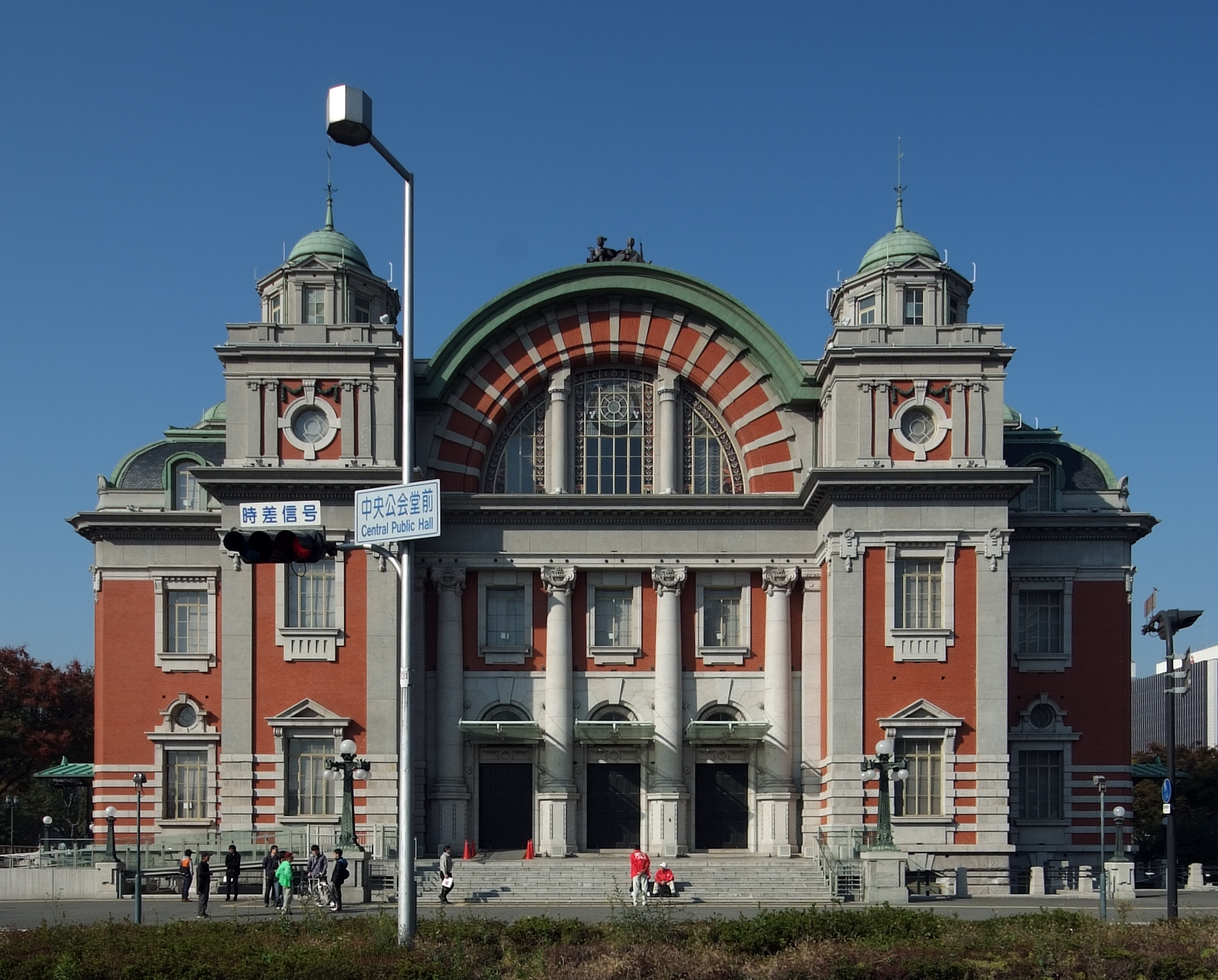
Osaka Central Public Hall

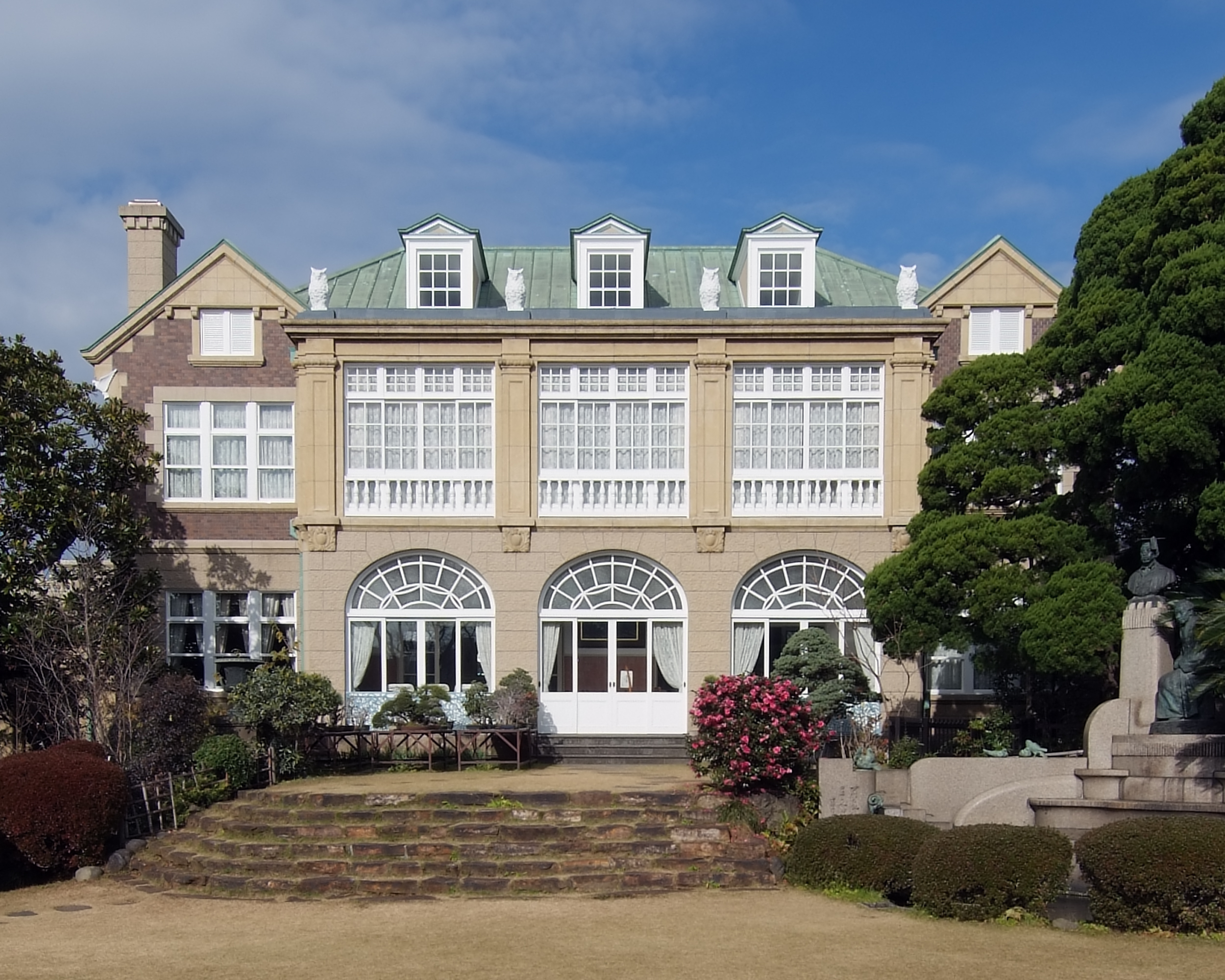
Hatoyama Hall

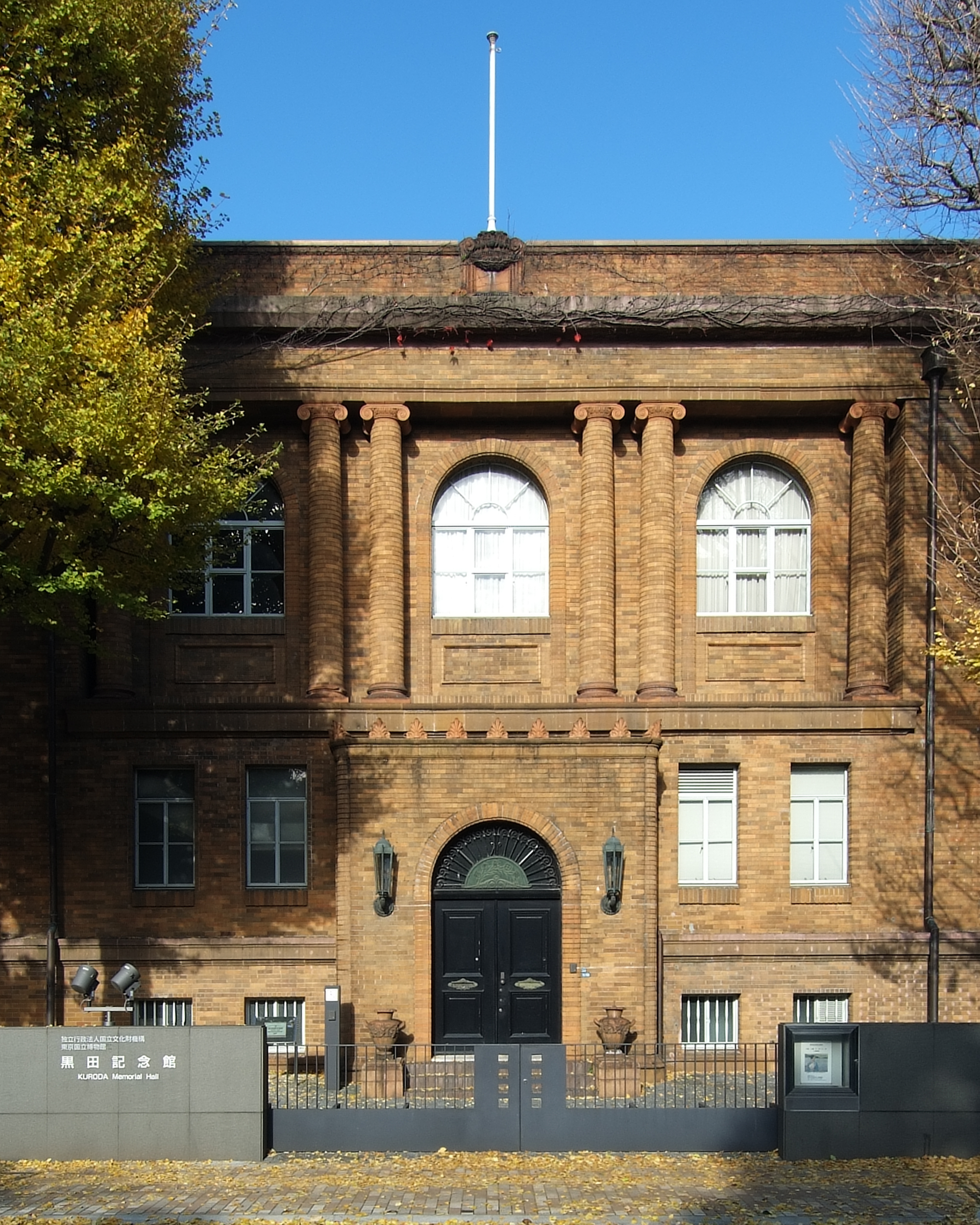
Kuroda Memorial Hall

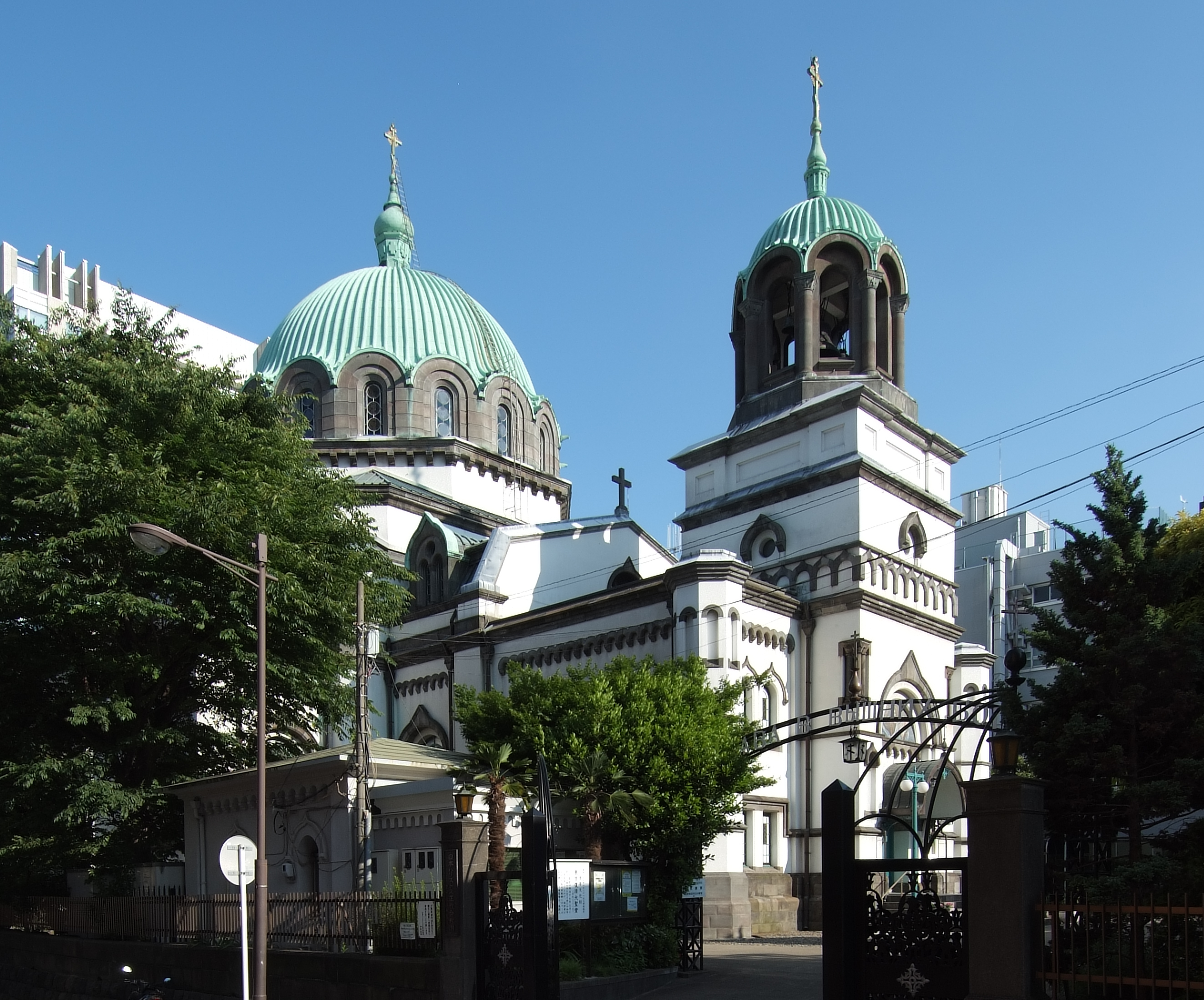
Tokyo Resurrection Cathedral

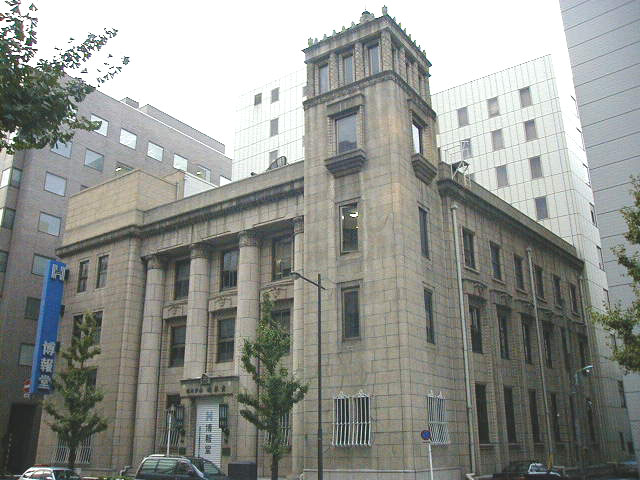
Hakuhodo

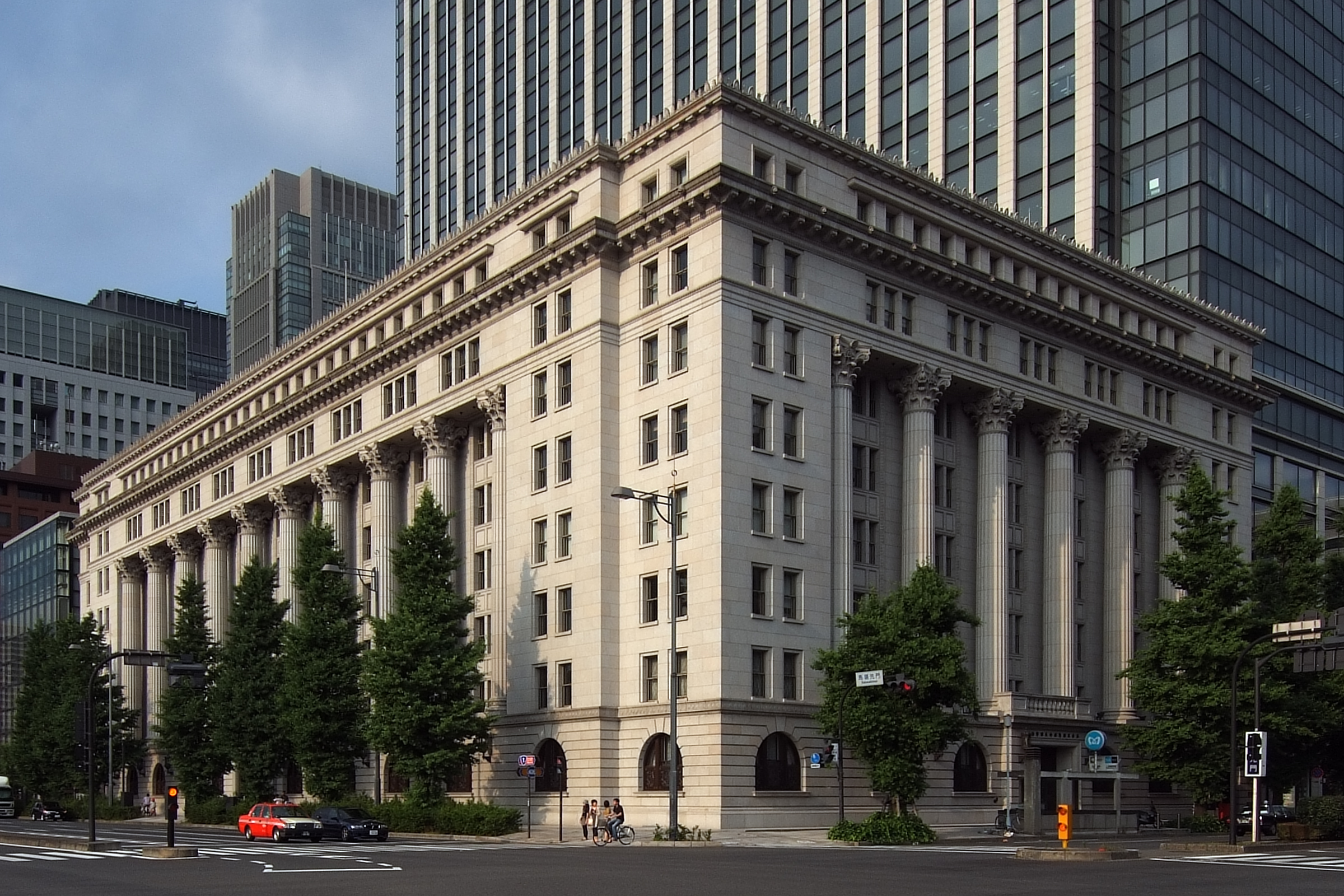
Meiji Yasuda Life Insurance Company Head Office

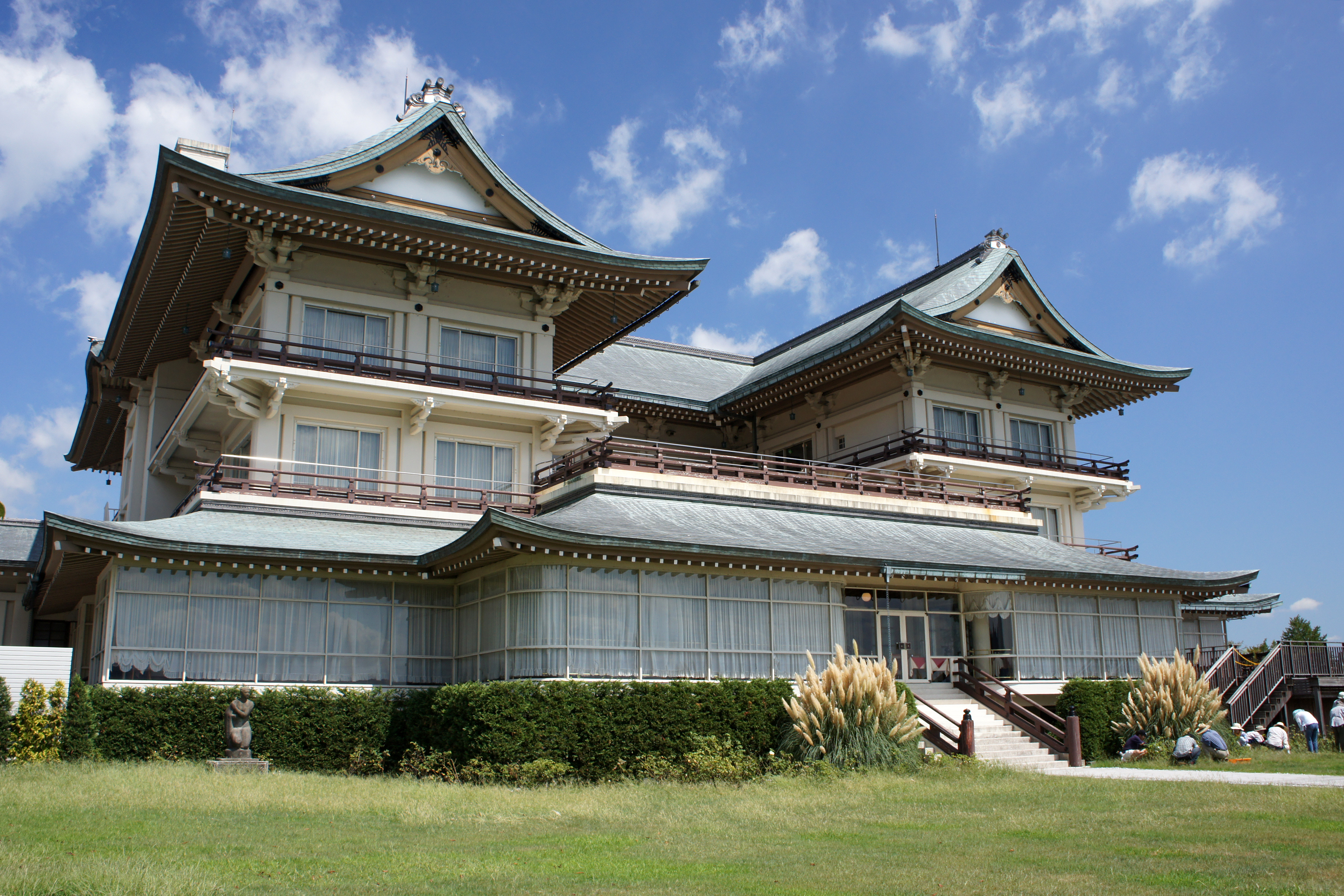
Biwako Otsukan
