= Akiya Takahashi =

Japanese art historian

- Born: 1953 (age 72–73); Japan Tokyo
- Occupation: Art historian

Akiya Takahashi (高橋 明也, Takahashi Akiya; born in 1953 in Tokyo) is a Japanese art historian and a founding director of the Mitsubishi Ichigokan Museum, Tokyo.

== Biography ==
For his master's degree at the Graduate School of Fine Arts, Tokyo University of the Arts, Takahashi majored in 19th century French Art History, with a particular focus on Eugène Delacroix and Édouard Manet. Takahashi held a position as a Curator at the National Museum of Western Art, Japan from 1980 to 2006. He served as a visiting fellow at the museum opening office of the Musée d'Orsay, Paris from 1984 to 1986, dispatched as part of the Overseas Researcher Program of the Ministry of Education, Japan. After acting as Senior Curator and Chief Curator at The National Museum of Western Art, Japan, Takahashi was appointed Director of the Mitsubishi Ichigokan Museum, Tokyo in 2006. He added the Maurice Joyant Collection, which houses over 250 lithographs and posters by Henri de Toulouse-Lautrec. The museum's opening exhibition was “Manet and Modern Paris”. Takahashi received the Chevalier dans l’Ordre des Arts et des Lettres in October 2010.

Takahashi's father, Hikoaki, is a scholar of French literature and former professor of the Education Faculty at Waseda University. Takahashi lived in Paris when he was an elementary student from 1965 through 1966 when he accompanied his father on sabbatical. Takahashi's wife Aki Ooka is an artist and poet. Makoto Ooka (poet and critic) and Saki Fukase (playwright) are Takahashi's parents-in-law, and Akira Ooka (novelist) is his brother-in-law.

== Major exhibitions curated ==
- Maurice Denis, Musée national d’art occidental, Tokyo, 1981
- L’Angélus de Millet. Tendences du réalisme en France, 1848*1870, Musée national d’Art occidental, Tokyo, 1982
- Space in European Art : Council of Europe Exhibition in Japan, Musée national d’Art occidental, Tokyo, 1987
- Japonisme, Musée national d’Art occidental, Tokyo, 1988
- Delacroix et le romantisme français, Musée national d’art occidental, Tokyo, Nagoya City Art Museum, 1989
- La peinture française du XIXème siècle : Le Musée des Beaux*Arts de Lille, Sogo Museum of Art Yokohama, Hokkaido Obihiro Museum of art, The museum of art Kintetsu, Osaka, The Yamaguchi prefectural Museum of Art, 1991
- Maître français 1550*1800:dessins de la donation Mathias Polakovits à l’Ecole des Beaux*Arts, Paris, Musée national d’art occidental, Tokyo, 1992
- Great French paintings from the Barnes Foundation, Musée national d’art occidental, Tokyo, 1994
- Paris en 1874: L’Année de l’Impressionisme, Musée national d’art occidental, Tokyo, 1994
- Rodin : Collection du Musée national d’art occidental, Yorozu Tetsugoro memorial art museum, 1996
- La Modernité : Collection du Musée d’Orsay, Musée métropolitain d’art de Tokyo, Musée Municipal de Kobe, 1996
- The birth of Impressionism, Musée Tobu, Tokyo, 1996
- Expressiveness of Materials, The National Museum of Art, Osaka, 1997
- Rêve et réalité : Collections du Musée d’Orsay, Musée Municipal de Kobé, Musée métropolitain d’art de Tokyo, 1999
- Woven pictures: 17th and 18th centuries European tapestries in the National Museum Western Art collection, Musée national d’art occidental, Tokyo, 2003
- Arts of East and West from World Expositions 1855*1900: Paris, Vienna and Chicago, Musée national de Tokyo, Musée Municipal des Beau*Arts d’Osaka et Musée Municipal de Nagoya, 2004
- Delacroix: lithograph illustrations for "Faust" and "Hamlet", Musée national d’art occidental, Tokyo, 2004
- Georges de La Tour, Musée national d’art occidental, Tokyo, 2005
- Paradis d’artistes au XIXeme siècle: collection du Musée d’Orsay, Musée Municipal de Kobé, Musée métropolitain d’art de Tokyo, 2006*2007
- Monet and French Landscape: Travellings of artists in 19th century France, Pola Museum of art, Hakone, 2007
- Corot: Souvenirs et variations, Musée national d’Art occidental, Tokyo, Musee municipal de Kobe, 2008
- AIG Collection: The Light of Impressionism, Dreams from the Ecole de Paris, The Museum of Modern Art, Toyama, 2008
- Manet et le Paris moderne, Musée Mitsubishi Ichigokan, Tokyo, 2010

== Publications ==
- Manet, Heibonsha, 1984
- Eugène Delacroix, Nigensha, 1999
- Gauguin－l’ame d’un artiste qui cherchait l’illusion d’une « sauvagerie », Rikuyousha, 2001
- The secret of masterpiece COROT, Chuokoron-Shinsha, Inc., 2008
- Connaître Manet :La vie et l’œuvre, Tokyo Bijutsu, 2010

== Major recent articles ==
«A Rediscovered Group of Sculptures by Leonardo Bistolfi from the Former Matsukata Collection», Journal of the National Museum of Western Art, n˚6, 2003, pp42–44

- «Une voix venue de l’ombre－Réflexions sur la première exposition Georges de La Tour au Japon－» catalogue d’exposition, Musée national d’Art occidental, Tokyo, 2005, pp192–198
- «Artists and Travel: Focusing on France», catalogue d’exposition, Pola Museum of Art, Hakone, 2007, pp168–170
- «Camille Corot : un peintre du XIXème siècle plus que jamais vivant», catalogue d’exposition, Musée national d’Art occidental, Tokyo, Musee municipal de Kobe, 2008, pp242–247
- «Manet, fondateur du modernisme?－ Ou plutôt maître de l’ambivalence...», catalogue d’exposition, Musée Mitsubishi Ichigokan, Tokyo, 2010, pp292–298

== Publications Co-Authored ==
- Musée du Louvre, 9 volumes, Shogakukan, 1985–1988
- France : les Régions et leurs merveilles, 2 volumes, Tokyo Shoseki, 2000
- The Museums of the World, 100vols. Kodansha, 2000–2002

== Translations ==
- Toulouse-Lautrec: the complete prints, Wolfgang Wittrock, Sotheby Parke Bernet Pubns, 1986/ Iwanami Shoten, 1990 (Japanese version)
- Hidden treasures revealed, Albert Grigor'evich Kostenevich, Harry N Abrams Inc, 1995/ Kodansha, 1995 (Japanese version)
- Romanticism, David Blayney Brown, 2001, Phaidon Press Limited /2004, Iwanami Shoten (Japanese version)
- The secret language of Art, Sara Carr-Gomm, 2001/ Toyo Shorin, 2004 (Japanese version)
- Georges de La Tour : Histoire d'une redécouverte, Jean-Pierre Cuzin et Dimitri Salmon. Collection "Découvertes Gallimard" (nº 329), série Arts. Gallimard : Réunion des musées nationaux; Sougensha, 2005 (Japanese version)
