= Seikadō Bunko Art Museum =

Coordinates: 35°40′44″N 139°45′41″E

- 静嘉堂文庫美術館
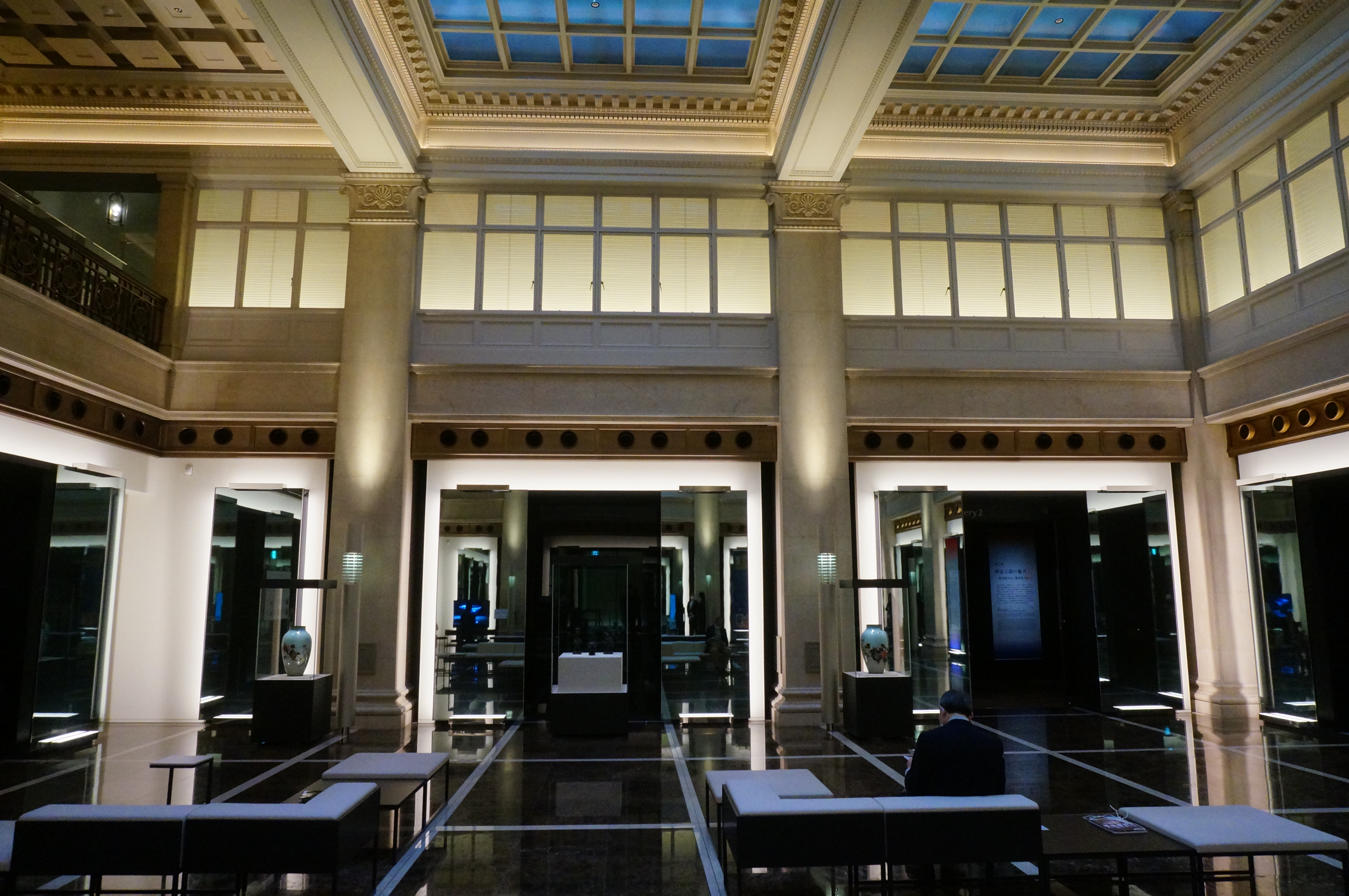
- Seikado Bunko Art Museum in the Meiji Seimei Kan.
- Established: 1992 (Setagaya); 2022 (Chiyoda)
- Location: Setagaya, Tokyo, Japan; Chiyoda, Tokyo, Japan
- Type: Art museum
- Website: http://www.seikado.or.jp/en/index.html

Seikadō Bunko Art Museum (静嘉堂文庫美術館) is a museum of East Asian art that opened in Setagaya, Tokyo in 1992. The museum's gallery moved to Meiji Seimei Kan in Marunouchi in Chiyoda, Tokyo in October 2022, but the foundation continues to operate and manage its collection in its former building in Setagaya.

== History ==
The Seikado Foundation was founded by Baron Yanosuke Iwasaki (1851-1908), the younger brother of Yataro Iwasaki, who was the second president of Mitsubishi, and expanded by Yanosuke's son, Koyata Iwasaki (1879-1945), who became the fourth president of Mitsubishi. Its collection today comprises 200,000 classic books and 6,500 works of old Oriental art, including 7 National Treasures and 83 Important Cultural Properties.

In 1892 Yanosuke established the Library and began to collect old Chinese and Japanese books more seriously, but the collection of old art works had started earlier. Yanosuke continued to purchase antiquities during the second and third decades of the Meiji (1868-1912) era, spending a huge amount of money. In addition to his admiration for old matters and objects, he had a strong desire to prevent old Oriental books and other cultural properties from going out of Japan, being scattered and lost from Japan as then Japanese had heavy inclination toward Western culture and ignoring its own at that time. He collected a wide range of art including swords, tea ceremony utensils, Chinese and Japanese paintings, calligraphy, ceramics, lacquerware, stationery and wood sculpture.

In 1940, Koyata established the Seikado Foundation and opened the Seikado Bunko Library. After his death in December 1945, 171 important works from his collection including National Treasures and Important Cultural Properties were bequeathed to the Foundation. Later, at the death of his wife Mrs. Takako Iwasaki in 1975, the entire collection of art works which remained in the Iwasaki family was donated together with the exhibit gallery to the Foundation by Tadao Iwasaki (1909-1980), who was the President of the Foundation. Since then until 1988 the art works were open to the public in the exhibit gallery annexed to the Foundation.

In April 1992, the art museum was newly built and inaugurated to mark the 100th anniversary of the Seikado Foundation. In 2009 Seikado was authorized by the Japanese government as a Public Interest Incorporated Foundation.

== Collection ==
The Seikado Bunko Museum houses 200,000 classic books and 6,500 East Asian cultural artifacts. As of September 2023, the Japanese government has designated 7 of these items as National Treasures and 84 as Important Cultural Properties. The museum's collection occupies an important place among private collections in Japan. The museum has four small galleries and only a few thematic exhibitions per year. As a result, only a small portion of the collection is on display at any one time.

At a high level, the collection includes books and calligraphy, paintings and prints, lacquer art, ceramics, tea ceremony utensils, stationary and infusion tea utensils, swords and swords furniture, Buddhist sculptures, and archaeological objects.

== See also ==
- List of National Treasures of Japan (crafts: others)
- List of National Treasures of Japan (crafts: swords)
- List of National Treasures of Japan (writings: Japanese books)

== Publications ==
- 120 Seikado Masterpieces, The Seikado Foundation (2013, 1st edition; 2015, 2nd edition)
