= Meiji Seimei Kan =

Building in Japan

Coordinates: 35°40′44.27″N 139°45′41.29″E

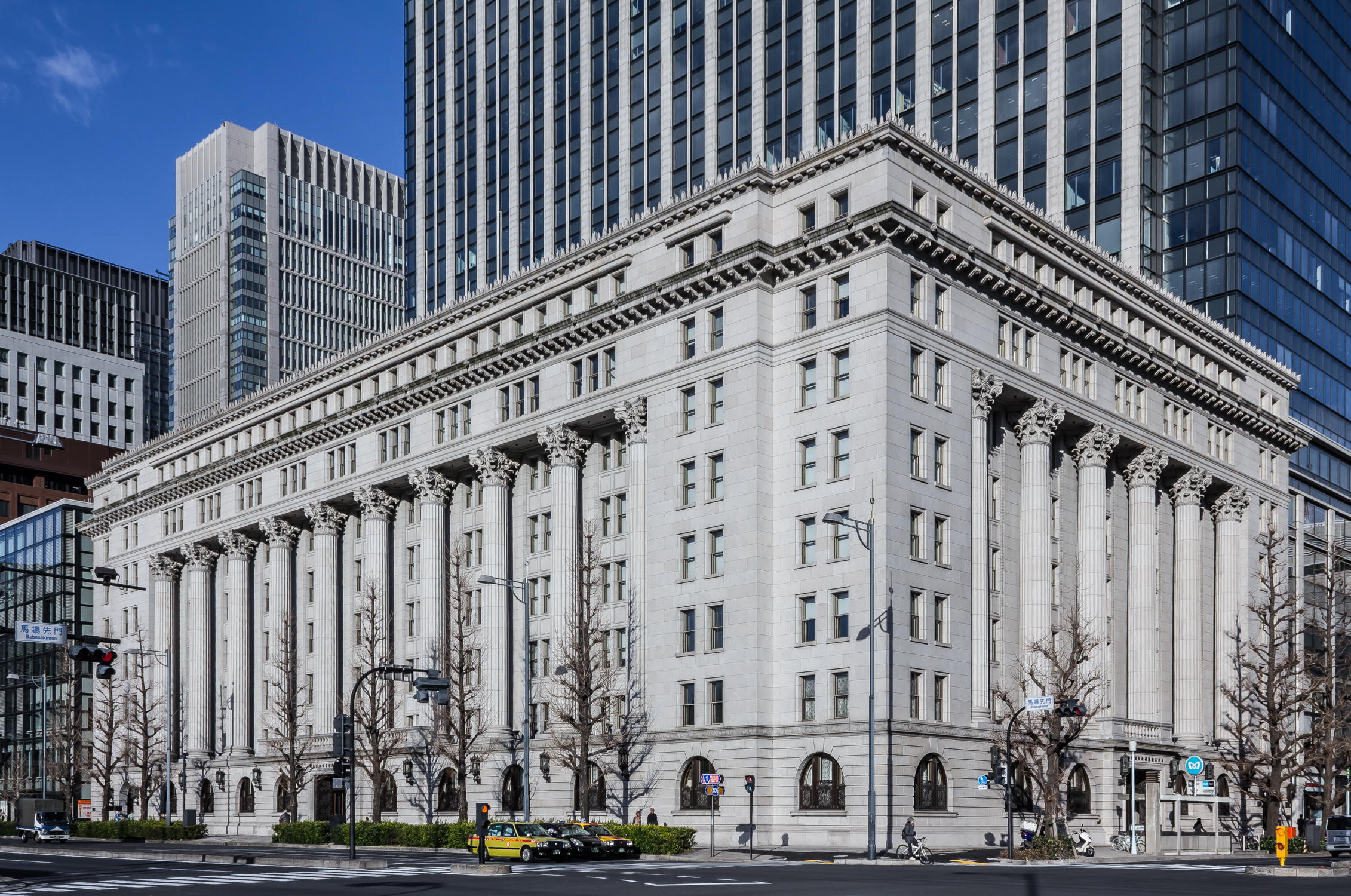
Meiji Seimei Kan

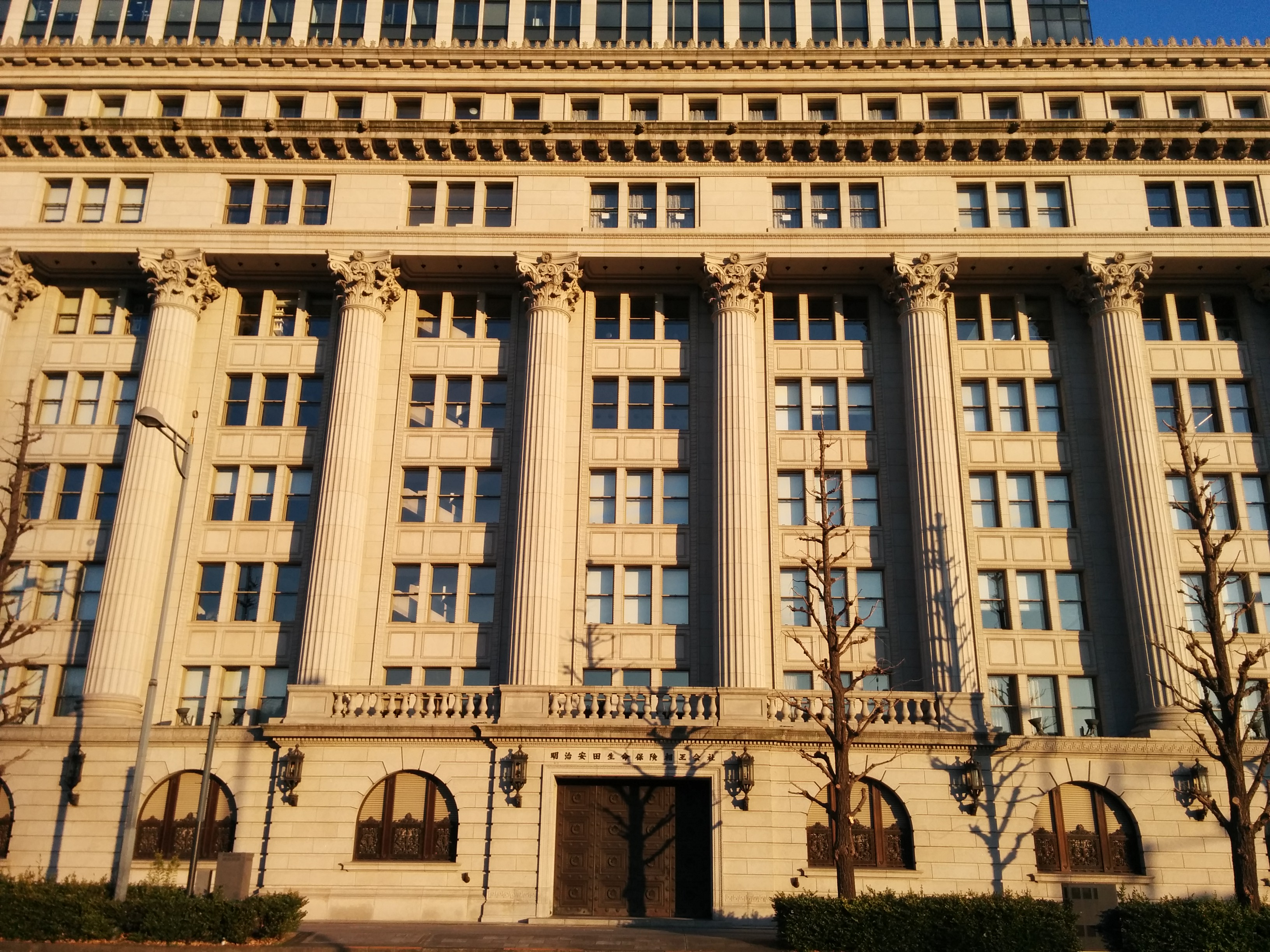
Close-up of the facade with monumental pillars

Meiji Seimei Kan (明治生命館) is a building in Marunouchi, Tokyo, Japan.

== History ==
The building was designed by Shinichiro Okada and completed in March 1934, two years after his death. It survived the bombing of Tokyo during World War II, but was taken over by the General Headquarters / Supreme Commander for the Allied Powers (GHQ/SCAP) after the war. It was returned to Meiji Insurance Company in 1956. In 1997, the building was designated a National Important Cultural Property. It was the first building erected in the Showa period to receive this honour.

== Architecture ==
The building is in the Greek Revival architecture style. The facade outside features monumental Corinthian pillars that is five stories high to the pediment, which is actually the fifth floor. The material used is concrete encased steel beam structure with a height of 31 m and an area of 3,856 m^{2}. It sits on a property of 11,347 m^{2}. It has 8 floors above ground and 2 below. The first and second floor, which contain conference rooms, dining rooms, offices, and waiting rooms, are open to the public for touring.

== See also ==
- Mitsubishi Ichigokan Museum, Tokyo
