= Kiyoshi Mutō =

Japanese architect (1903–1989)

Kiyoshi Mutō (武藤 清, Mutō Kiyoshi; 29 January 1903 – 12 March 1989) was a Japanese architect and structural engineer. He is considered the "father of the Japanese skyscraper" for his contributions to earthquake engineering.

== Earthquake engineering research ==
Mutō was born in Toride, Ibaraki, Japan. He entered the Department of Architecture at Tokyo Imperial University (now the University of Tokyo) in 1922 and graduated in 1925. He was immediately appointed Lecturer, and obtained a Dr of Engineering degree in 1931. In 1935, he was appointed Professor of Structural Engineering, a post which he held for almost 30 years, developing and teaching the principles of earthquake-resistant design.

Among his best known contributions was the development of a simple but accurate method for routine structural analysis of a moment resisting frame under lateral loading. Known as the "D Method", it replaced tedious, time-consuming calculations with numerical tables, and was widely used for many years throughout the world. It was adopted into the Calculation Standard of the Architectural Institute of Japan in 1933.

== Work as structural engineer ==
After retiring from the University of Tokyo in 1963, Mutō became executive vice president of Kajima Corporation, a major construction company. He also founded his own company, the Mutō Institute of Structural Mechanics, in 1965. At Kajima, he led the team that designed Japan's first high-rise building, the 36-story Kasumigaseki Building. Among his innovations for this building was first energy dissipation system used in Japan, a slit wall system consisting of precast reinforced concrete strips that stabilized the building under strong winds and small earthquakes and absorbed the energy of strong earthquakes.

== Works ==
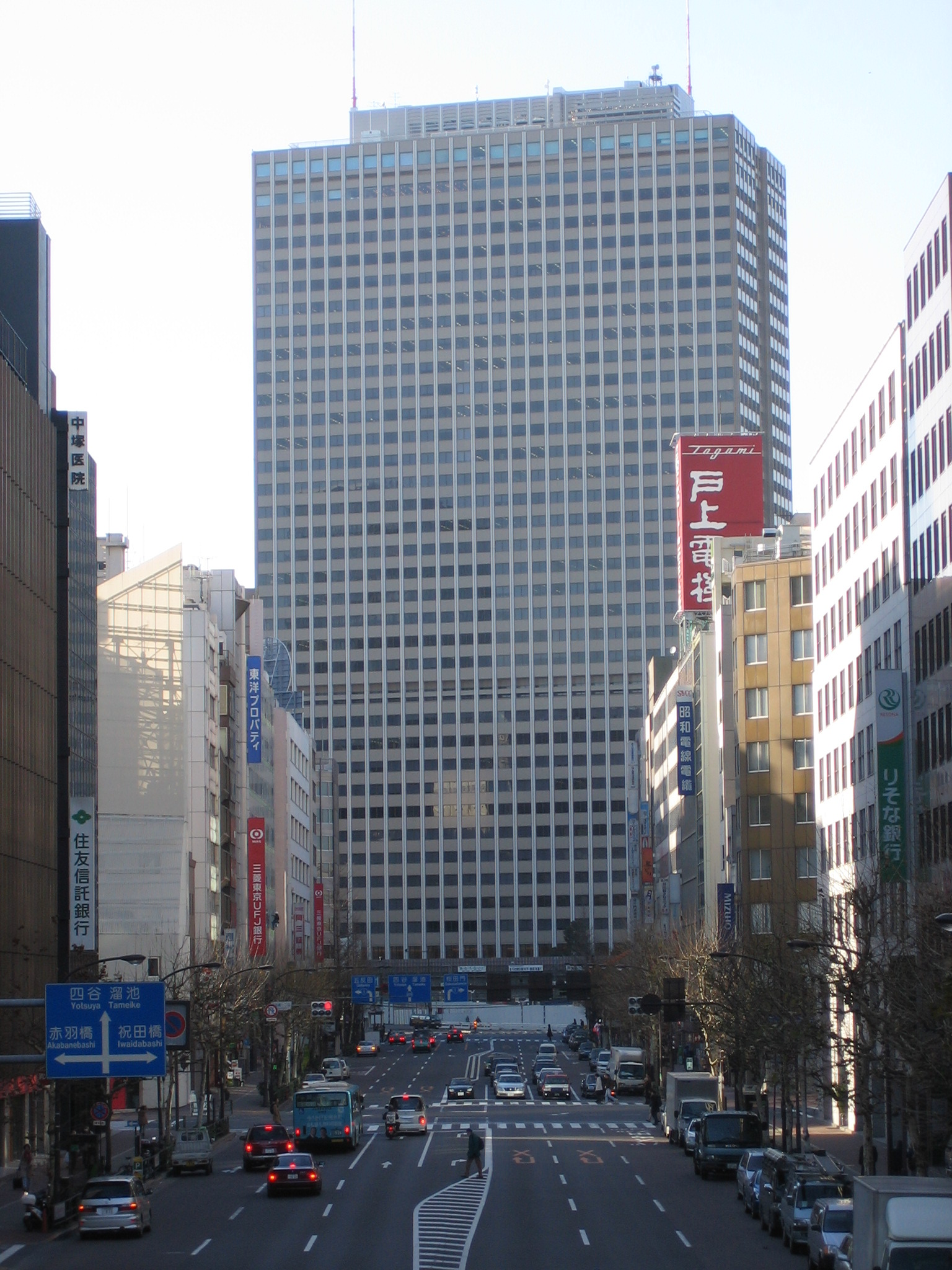
Kasumigaseki Building (Tokyo)

Mutō was the structural engineer for many of Tokyo's tallest and best-known buildings, including the following.

- Kasumigaseki Building (1967)
- World Trade Center (1970)
- Keio Plaza Hotel (1971)
- Shinjuku Mitsui Building (1974)
- Sunshine 60 (1978)
- Grand Prince Hotel Akasaka (1982)
- Tokyo Metropolitan Government Building (1991)
