= Sumitomo Realty & Development =

Japanese real estate developer

Sumitomo Realty & Development Co., Ltd.
- Native name: 住友不動産株式会社
- Romanized name: Sumitomo Fudosan Kabushiki-gaisha
- Formerly: Izumi Real Estate Co., Ltd. (1949 - 1957)
- Company type: Public (K.K)
- Traded as: TYO: 8830
- Industry: Real estate development
- Founded: December 1, 1949; 76 years ago
- Headquarters: Shinjuku NS Building; 4-1, Nishi-Shinjuku 2-chome, Shinjuku, Tokyo, Japan
- Area served: Japan
- Key people: Kenichi Onodera, Chairman; Kojun Nishima, President
- Subsidiaries: Sumitomo Real Estate Sales Co., Ltd.; Sumitomo Fudosan Tatemono Service Co., Ltd.; Sumitomo Fudosan Syscon Co., Ltd.; Sumitomo Fudosan Villa Fontaine Co., Ltd.; Sumitomo Fudosan Bellesalle Co., Ltd.; Sumitomo Fudosan Esforta Co., Ltd.; Sumitomo Fudosan Finance Co., Ltd.
- Website: https://www.sumitomo-rd.co.jp/

Sumitomo Realty & Development Co., Ltd. is a Japanese real estate development company headquartered in Shinjuku, Tokyo. It is a member of the Sumitomo Group.

It is one of the three largest real estate developers in Japan, alongside Mitsubishi Estate and Mitsui Fudosan. As of 2018, it has the second-largest real estate portfolio in Japan (after Mitsubishi), with a total value of 5.7 trillion yen.

== History ==
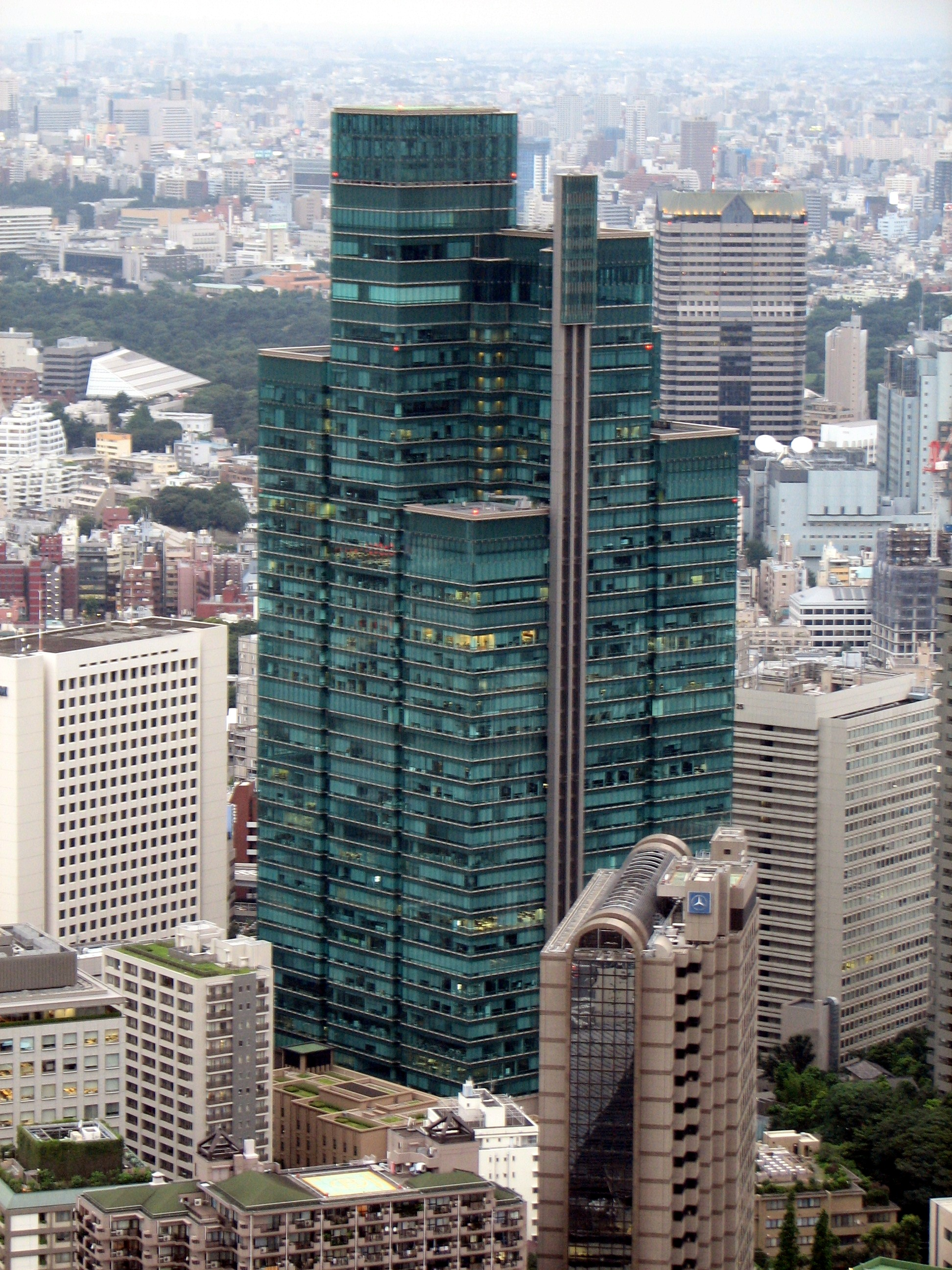
Izumi Garden Tower in Roppongi, Tokyo

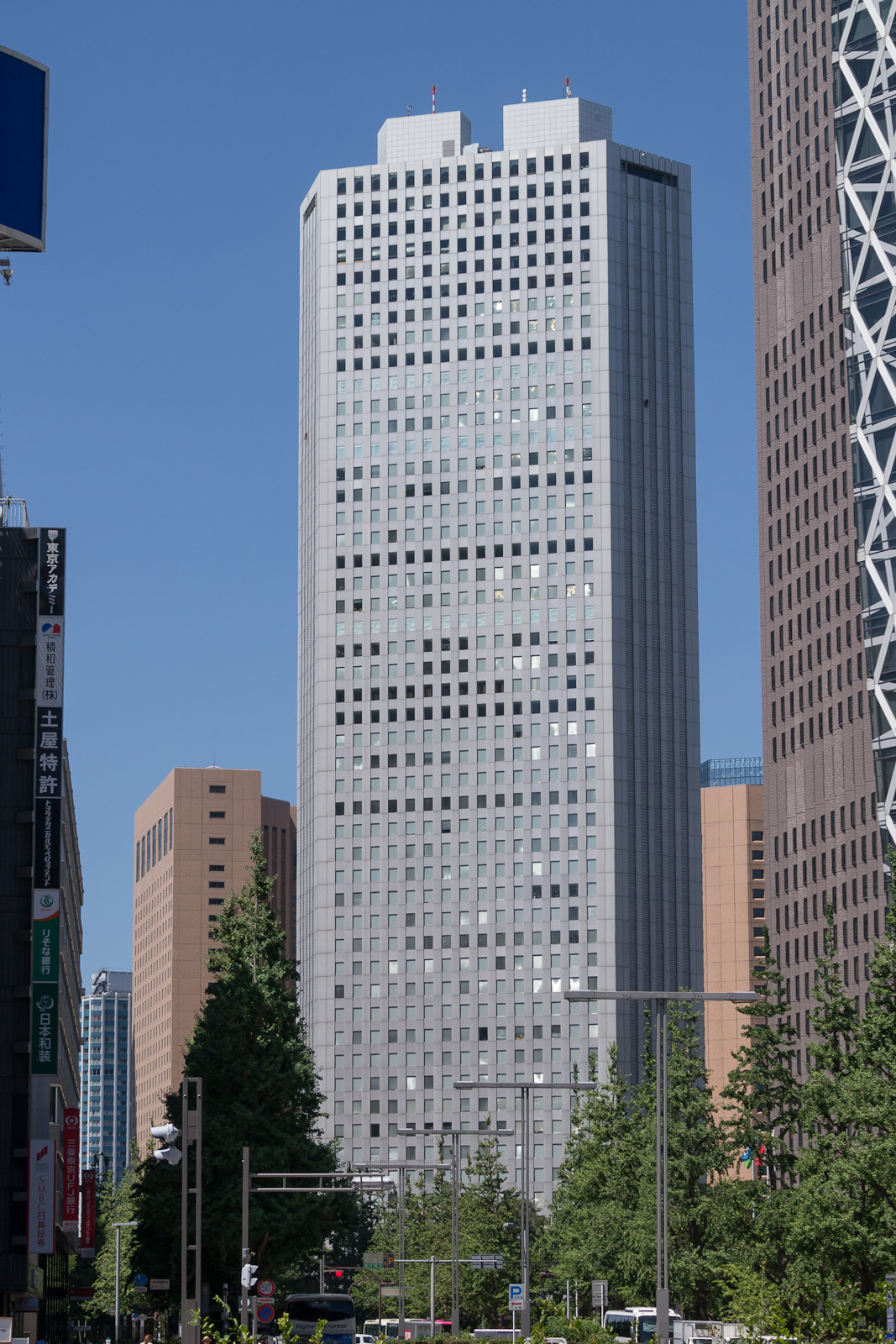
Shinjuku Sumitomo Building in Nishi-Shinjuku, Tokyo

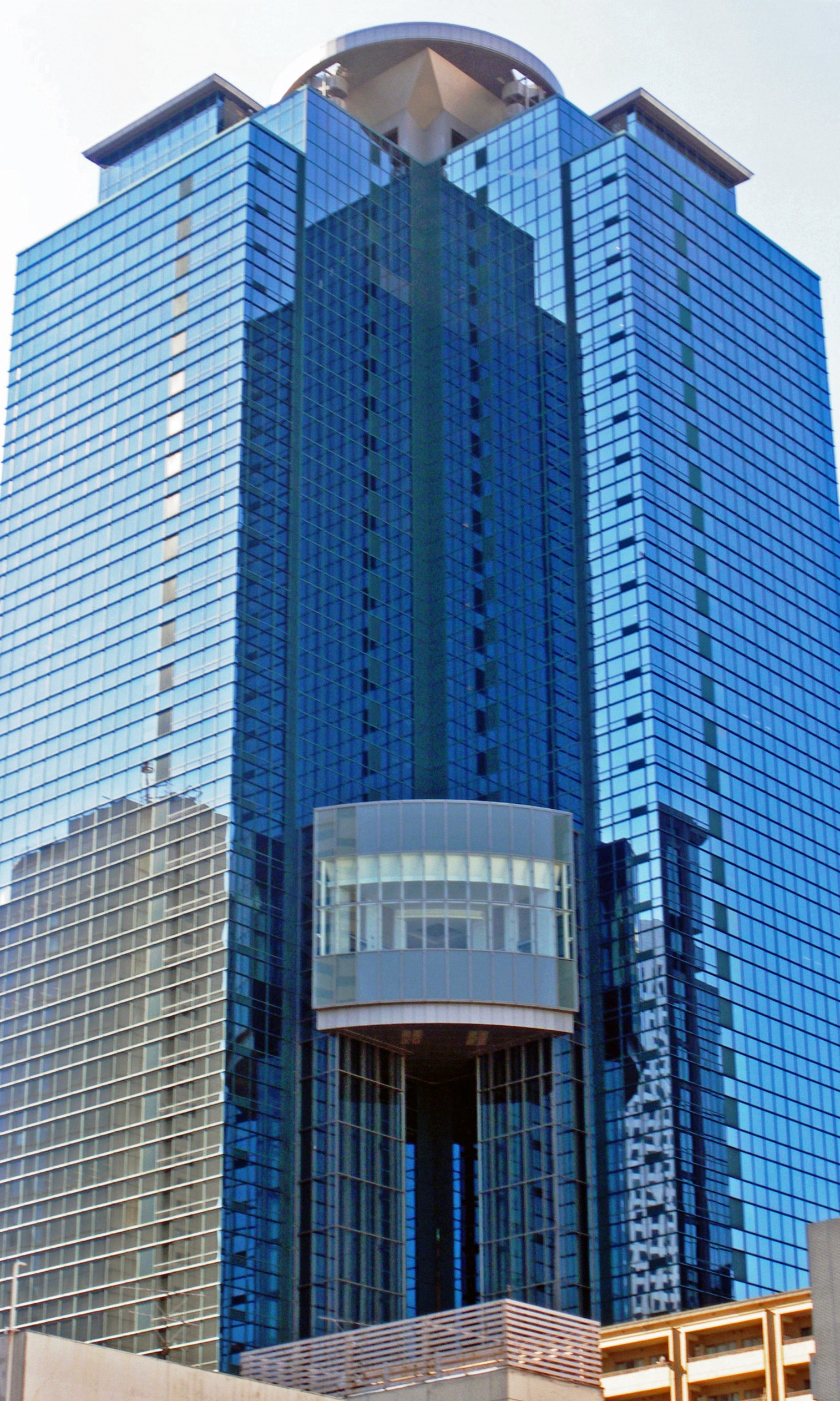
Shinjuku Oak Tower in Nishi-Shinjuku, Tokyo

The company was founded as Izumi Real Estate Co., Ltd. in 1949 following the dissolution of the Sumitomo conglomerate. It adopted its current name in 1957.

From the early 1960s, Sumitomo was active in developing and selling condominium properties.

Sumitomo Realty held its initial public offering on the Tokyo and Osaka stock exchanges in 1970.

The company's first high-rise project was the Shinjuku Sumitomo Building, completed in 1974. This building became the company's head office. At the time of its completion, it was the tallest building in Tokyo (but was overtaken by the nearby Shinjuku Mitsui Building several months later), and its elevators were the fastest in the world.

Sumitomo entered the real estate leasing and brokerage businesses in the late 1970s; commercial and residential leasing now accounts for the majority of its income.

The company's headquarters moved to the 30-story Shinjuku NS Building (a Sumitomo-developed property) in 1982.

Sumitomo actively invested in California and Hawaii real estate during the 1970s. In 1987, Sumitomo acquired the Tishman Building at 666 Fifth Avenue in New York City, which it sold at a loss in 1998. In 1989, Sumitomo acquired the JW Marriott hotel in Century City, Los Angeles for $85 million. Sumitomo also set up subsidiaries in Washington, D.C. and Sydney during the 1980s.

In the mid-1990s, Sumitomo began a home renovation and remodeling business known as Shinchiku Sokkurisan.

Historically, Sumitomo has followed a policy of never selling the properties that it develops.

== Notable properties ==
=== Office towers ===
Sumitomo owns around 220 office buildings in Tokyo, most of which are located in the city's seven central wards. Its largest developments include:

- Shinjuku Sumitomo Building (1974)
- Shinjuku NS Building (1982)
- Izumi Garden Tower (2002)
- Shinjuku Oak City (2003)
- Tokyo Shiodome Building (2004)
- City Tower Takanawa (2004)
- Shinjuku Grand Tower (2011)
- Tokyo Nihombashi Tower (2015)
- Roppongi Grand Tower (2016)

=== Hotels ===
Sumitomo Realty operates the Hotel Villa Fontaine chain, which has a total of 15 properties in Japan (Tokyo, Kobe and Osaka).
