= List of Tensou Sentai Goseiger episodes =

This is a list of Tensou Sentai Goseiger episodes. Each episode is referred to as an "epic".

== Episodes ==
No.	Title	Written by	Original release date
1	"The Gosei Angels Descend"; Transliteration: "Gosei Tenshi, Kōrin" (Japanese: 護星天使、降臨)	Michiko Yokote	February 14, 2010
In preparation for their invasion of Earth, the Warstar army's leader Mons Drake deploys his second-in-command Dereputa to destroy the Heaven's Tower and prevent Gosei World's Gosei Angels from interfering. Despite succeeding, Dereputa is attacked by one of several Gosei Angels who were already on Earth, Alata of the Skick Tribe. Ten days later, a boy named Nozomu Amachi sees Alata using his powers to rescue a baby and befriends him before Alata leaves, dropping a blank card. Alata later joins four Gosei Angels, who have assumed their Goseiger forms to fight Warstar's Beebe soldiers, only to realize he lost the card he needs to transform into his own form. As his allies defeat the monsters and berate him for his carelessness, they see that Nozomu followed him and attempt to erase his memories and keep their existence secret. However, Alata vouches for Nozomu, saying he can be trusted, and the group leave him. Meanwhile, Warstar sends a soldier named Mizogu to attack humans. The Goseigers attempt to stop him, but he traps all except Alata. Nozomu arrives to give Alata his card back, allowing him to help his fellow Goseigers kill Mizogu. However, they are confronted by Dereputa.
2	"The Fantastic Goseigers"; Transliteration: "Fantasutikku Goseijā" (Japanese: ファンタスティック・ゴセイジャー)	Michiko Yokote	February 21, 2010
Dereputa announces the arrival of Warstar before abruptly leaving. Alata explains who he is and what he did to his fellow Goseigers before breaking off to walk Nozomu home. In the process, he meets Nozomu's father, Shuichirou Amachi. Meanwhile, Goseiger members Eri and Hyde of the Skick and Seaick Tribes respectively investigate the Heaven's Tower's ruins, where their leader Master Head attempts to contact them on how they can return to Gosei World. Eventually, Hyde learns of an upcoming yet rare solar flare that can facilitate this. Elsewhere, Goseiger members and Landick Tribe siblings Agri and Moune battle another Warstar soldier named Zaruwaku, who was sent to kidnap humans. After contacting their allies, Alata, Eri, and Hyde join the siblings in rescuing Zaruwaku's captives before defeating him. However, Warstar strategist Buredoran sends Beebe Bugs to enlarge Zaruwaku. Undeterred, the Goseigers unlock the ability to summon giant Gosei Machines, which they combine to form the mecha Gosei Great and kill Zaruwaku. Afterward, Hyde uses his powers to erase the alien's victims' memories while Master Head observes the Goseigers' progress.
3	"Landick Power Divided"; Transliteration: "Randikku Pawā, Bunretsu" (Japanese: ランディックパワー、分裂)	Michiko Yokote	February 28, 2010
As the Skick Goseigers move in with Nozomu and become Shuichirou's assistants, the Landick siblings establish a camp for themselves in the mountains so they can hone their abilities. However, they get into an argument over Moune's fighting skills before sensing a Warstar soldier named Yuzeikusu mounting an attack. As their allies arrive to help them, Moune tries to fight the alien on her own, only to get hurt while using an imperfect Landick technique before Agri forces the alien to retreat. As the siblings renew their argument, Alata suggests they all move into the Amachis' home, but they refuse. Moune then runs off to fight Yuzeikusu again and prove herself better than Agri. Concurrently, her teammates search for her, during which Alata teaches Agri the importance of having friends. They soon rescue an overwhelmed Moune and join her in defeating Yuzeikusu. After killing the enlarged alien, Hyde and the Landick siblings move in with the Amachis and Skick Goseigers.
4	"Play the Angel's Song"; Transliteration: "Hibike, Tenshi no Uta" (Japanese: 響け、天使の歌)	Michiko Yokote	March 7, 2010
While cleaning the Amachis' home, the Landick siblings find an arcade machine, which later comes to life and reveals his name is Datas and that he was sent by Master Head to help the Goseigers. Meanwhile, the Skick Goseigers are attacked by a Warstar soldier named Mazuarta, who came to Earth to play pain-inducing rock music. Due to their highly sensitive sense of hearing, the pair fail to defeat the alien before he leaves. The pair eventually return home, where their friends attempt to comfort them. After Datas detects Mazuarta taking over a concert hall to broadcast his music globally, Hyde and the Landick siblings leave to stop him, only for Buredoran to intervene. Nonetheless, the Skick Goseigers arrive and use Eri's singing to negate Mazuarta's music and destroy his broadcasting machine. After Hyde and the Landick siblings repel Buredoran, the pair join them in defeating Mazuarta before using their mecha to kill the enlarged alien. Afterward, the Goseigers make failed attempts at contacting Master Head.
5	"Magical Hyde"; Transliteration: "Majikaru Haido" (Japanese: マジカル・ハイド)	Naruhisa Arakawa	March 14, 2010
Master Head attempts to contact the Goseigers to tell them how to summon Headder mecha hidden on Earth via Datas, but they lose reception. Soon after, Nozomu arrives to tell them of a "Genius Cold" epidemic spreading around his school. Hyde later discovers a Warstar soldier named Ucyuseruzo attacking a civilian. The alien's armor plating proves too difficult for Hyde to penetrate, but an arriving Agri forces Ucyuseruzo to retreat. After the pair ask the civilian why Ucyuseruzo attacked her, she introduces herself as Dr. Renko Shikishima and takes them to her son, Kenichi, who was infected with the "Genius Cold" and transforms into a Beebe soldier. As the others contain the infected, Hyde uses his powers to disguise himself as Renko and lure Ucyuseruzo into a trap before borrowing Agri's axe to weaken him so he can extract his hemolymph to help Renko create a cure. The Goseigers soon defeat Ucyuseruzo, but Buredoran restores his armor while enlarging him. The alien overpowers Gosei Great until Hyde summons the Seaick Brother Headders and combines them with the mecha to kill Ucyuseruzo. Afterward, Renko cures the alien's victims while Hyde and Agri start to form a mutual understanding.
6	"The Breakout Goseigers"; Transliteration: "Bureikuauto Goseijā" (Japanese: ブレイクアウト・ゴセイジャー)	Naruhisa Arakawa	March 21, 2010
Alata attempts to comfort Nozomu upon learning the boy cannot perform pull-ups, but Nozomu runs off. Following this, Alata joins the other Goseigers in confronting a Warstar soldier named Hidou, but are overwhelmed by his super-speed. Alata uses his wind sensory power to cripple the alien, but Dereputa overpowers him before the aliens leave. While the others train to master Alata's power, Alata attempts to perform pull-ups for Nozomu despite his injuries until Datas alerts them to Hidou's return. As Alata fights and defeats Dereputa, the other Goseigers defeat Hidou. However, Buredoran enlarges the alien, who proves too fast for Gosei Great. The Landick siblings' determination grants them the ability to summon the Landick Brother Headders and combine them with the mecha so they can kill Hidou. Following this, Alata vows to train harder to defeat Dereputa properly while Nozomu works on performing pull-ups with help from his friends.
7	"Protect the Land!"; Transliteration: "Daichi o Mamore!" (Japanese: 大地を護れ！)	Akatsuki Yamatoya	March 28, 2010
While out shopping, Eri and Agri encounter an old man named Jotaro, who defeats Agri in a sumo wrestling match and takes Eri home with him. Despite learning of what happened, the other Goseigers choose to leave Agri alone while he performs menial labor for Jotaro to get Eri back. Meanwhile, the Goseigers fight a Warstar scientist named Abauta, who allows them to attack him without fighting back before leaving. Afterward, Agri reluctantly takes Eri back to Jotaro and resumes his chores, during which she notices a photo of the man with his presumed deceased wife, Sachiko. The next day, Eri discusses her findings with Agri before they leave to rejoin their friends in stopping Abauta, who has returned to destroy all plant life on Earth. Despite learning that he adapted to their fighting styles, Agri uses his newly learned gardening skills to defeat Abauta. After killing the enlarged alien, the Goseigers are shocked to learn Sachiko is alive, having returned from a vacation, and Jotaro is a pervert before erasing his memories.
8	"Out of Control Gosei Power"; Transliteration: "Gosei Pawā, Bōsō" (Japanese: ゴセイパワー、暴走)	Akatsuki Yamatoya	April 4, 2010
The Goseigers confront a childish Warstar solder named Fandaho. Though they force him to retreat, the alien successfully hits Alata with a beam that scrambles his powers. The other Goseigers mount attempts to cure him, to no avail. The next day, the group try to fight Fandaho again in the hopes that defeating him will undo his effect on Alata. However, Buredoran intervenes, overwhelming the Goseigers with his extensive combat experience before enlarging Fandaho before they can defeat him. In his desperation to help his friends, Alata summons the Exotic Brother Headders and combines them with Gosei Great so they can kill Fandaho, curing Alata and causing the Exotic Brothers to disappear.
9	"Gotcha☆Gosei Girls"; Transliteration: "Gatcha Gosei Gāruzu" (Japanese: ガッチャ☆ゴセイガールズ)	Michiko Yokote	April 11, 2010
As Moune attempts to establish house rules, she clashes with Eri over the latter's carefree attitude and the former's strictness. The Goseigers soon learn that Warstar sent a soldier named Irian to capture human men with her paralyzing poison. They attempt to stop her, but she captures the male Goseigers and knocks out the female members. Upon regaining consciousness, Moune and Eri attempt to find their missing friends with Datas' help, but he cannot pinpoint them. Using male trees, Moune uses her powers to locate Irian as she is converting her captives into furniture. She then restrains Eri, believing she will only hinder her, before leaving to fight Irian. Refusing to accept this, Eri's desire to help Moune allows her to summon miniature versions of the Skick Brother Headders and join the fray. Together, the female Goseigers defeat Irian and free her victims. After Irian gets enlarged, the reunited team enlarge and combine the Skick Brothers with Gosei Great to kill her. Afterward, Eri and Moune reconcile and bond over berating Alata for teasing them during the last fight.
10	"Hyde's Partner"; Transliteration: "Haido no Aibō" (Japanese: ハイドの相棒)	Michiko Yokote	April 18, 2010
In flashbacks, amidst Dereputa's attack on the Heaven's Tower, Warstar sent a soldier named Kurasunigo to boil the Earth's oceans. However, he was thwarted by Hyde's Gosei Angel partner, Magis, who sacrificed himself to seemingly kill the alien. In the present, Hyde learns Kurasunigo survived and has returned to resume his mission. Enraged, the former tries to stop him without his allies' help, but is defeated before Kurasunigo leaves. The Goseigers demand Hyde for answers, but he storms off. Upon making contact with him, Master Head reveals what happened to Magis along with Hyde's survivor's guilt. The next day, Hyde overloads Datas' processors while searching for information on Kurasunigo before Shuichirou introduces him to his marine biologist friend, Professor Sakana. While volunteering at Sakana's aquarium, Hyde is reminded of his Gosei Angel duties and forgoes seeking revenge before joining his friends in reengaging and defeating Kurasunigo. After using their mecha to kill the enlarged Kurasunigo, the Goseigers help cheer up Hyde as he pays his respects to Magis.
11	"Spark, Landick Power"; Transliteration: "Supāku Randikku Pawā" (Japanese: スパーク・ランディックパワー)	Naruhisa Arakawa	April 25, 2010
Annoyed over the Goseigers' interference, Mons Drake sends an elite soldier named Yokubabanger to kill them. Meanwhile, the Goseigers discover Moune became a volunteer at a general hospital and is secretly using her powers to cheer up a patient named Miku before she undergoes an operation. Upon learning of Yokubabanger's presence, the Goseigers leave to stop him, but he drains the city's power to overwhelm them. Realizing that he took out the hospital's emergency power, Moune leads the Goseigers in continuing the fight. However, Mons Drake intervenes to help Yokubabanger. Unable to stand by anymore, Datas travels to the hospital and tells Moune to use her powers to strengthen him so he can restore the hospital's power. After the Goseigers defeat him, Buredoran enlarges Yokubabanger, who drains Gosei Great's power. Wanting to help them, Datas summons the Hyper Charge Headder, which transforms him into Datas Hyper and grants him the power to kill Yokubabanger. As an incensed Mons Drake vows to eliminate the Goseigers, the group check on Miku following her operation.
12	"The Miraculous Gosei Headder Great Assembly"; Transliteration: "Mirakuru Gosei Heddā Daishūgō" (Japanese: ミラクル・ゴセイヘッダー大集合)	Naruhisa Arakawa	May 2, 2010
Refusing to spend more time on the Goseigers, Mons Drake and Dereputa travel to Earth to prepare the "Gravity Fall" ceremony. Upon learning of their plot, the Goseigers arrive to stop them, but are overwhelmed and lose their powers. Before the aliens can kill them, Master Head brings them back to the Amachis' home and tells them they must combine their powers to save Earth and restore full access to them. Meanwhile, Mons Drake orders Dereputa to stab him so the former can use his planetary powers to pull the moon closer to Earth. However, the reinvigorated Goseigers return to thwart them, having communed with their primary elements beforehand. While Mons Drake retreats, Dereputa orders Buredoran to enlarge him, allowing him to overpower Gosei Great and Datas Hyper. Nonetheless, the Goseigers recall Master Head's message and combine all of their mecha to form Hyper Gosei Great and seemingly kill Dereputa.
13	"Run! The Mystic Runner"; Transliteration: "Hashire! Misutikku Rannā" (Japanese: 走れ！ミスティックランナー)	Akatsuki Yamatoya	May 9, 2010
Mons Drake orders Buredoran and a soldier named Powereddark to kill the Goseigers and avenge Dereputa. The Goseigers convene to fight the aliens, but Powereddark uses Buredoran's newly developed Power Seeds to counter most of their abilities until Alata drives them off with a new Skick technique. Unable to perform the attack herself, Eri asks Alata to train her, but grows frustrated over his strange training methods until she realizes he is using the same methods she used to teach him when they were children. They soon rejoin their friends to fight Powereddark once more, only to learn Buredoran gave him the means to counter all of their abilities. Nevertheless, the Skick Goseigers combine their powers to defeat the alien before summoning the Mystic Brothers mecha to repel Buredoran. He enlarges Powereddark, but the Goseigers combine the Mystic Brothers with Gosei Great to kill him. Afterward, Eri starts to develop feelings for Alata.
14	"Birth of the Ultimate Tag Team!"; Transliteration: "Saikyō Taggu Tanjō!" (Japanese: 最強タッグ誕生！)	Akatsuki Yamatoya	May 16, 2010
As Moune and Hyde become embroiled in an argument, Datas detects the arrival of an elite Warstar soldier named Targate, who has come to earn Dereputa's place as Mons Drake's second-in-command by using his teleportation and portal production powers to steal several buildings. The Goseigers split up to stop him, with Hyde and Moune confronting Targate until they resume their argument, allowing him to trap them in an interdimensional prison while he overpowers the others. Working together, the pair escape and defeat Targate before the Goseigers use their mecha to kill the enlarged alien, restoring the buildings he stole in the process. Refusing to accept another failure, Mons Drake opts to kill the Goseigers personally.
15	"Countdown! The Life of the Earth"; Transliteration: "Kauntodaun! Hoshi no Inochi" (Japanese: カウントダウン！地球の命)	Michiko Yokote	May 23, 2010
Mons Drake orders Buredoran to use the Warstar mothership, the Indevader, to remove Earth's oxygen while he announces to the world that the planet will be destroyed in one day. The Goseigers confront him, but he overpowers them before sparing them so they can witness Earth's destruction. The next day, despite struggling to breathe, the Goseigers renew their efforts to stop Mons Drake, who eats a Beebe Bug to enlarge himself before revealing he tasked Buredoran with crashing the Indevader into Earth and use the stolen oxygen to incinerate the planet. After a grueling fight, the Goseigers eventually use Hyper Gosei Great to kill Mons Drake and destroy the Indevader, restoring Earth's oxygen, though Buredoran secretly escapes. Once they erase all memory of Mons Drake's attack from the citizens' memories, the Goseigers return home to celebrate.
16	"Dynamic Alata"; Transliteration: "Dainamikku Arata" (Japanese: ダイナミックアラタ)	Michiko Yokote	May 30, 2010
As the Goseigers, save for Alata, celebrate defeating Warstar, Datas receives a message from Master Head telling them that they can take a break from saving the world and focus on their future as Gosei Angels. Amidst this however, Eri and the Landick siblings are attacked by Dereputa, who summons a meteor shower to lure out Alata and Hyde. While fighting them, he reveals that he narrowly survived being attacked by Hyper Gosei Great and now wants to restore his honor by seeking revenge on Alata. After Hyde takes an attack meant for Alata, taking him out of the fight, Alata eventually kills Dereputa in combat. Unbeknownst to the Goseigers however, the alien's meteor shower had unearthed a strange box and released a new evil.
17	"A New Enemy! The Yuumajuu"; Transliteration: "Aratana Teki! Yūmajū" (Japanese: 新たな敵！幽魔獣)	Naruhisa Arakawa	June 6, 2010
Days after defeating Dereputa, the Goseigers discover a tunnel and footprints leading away from it. Worsening matters, Datas alerts them to a monstrous presence using slime to dissolve people into toxic sludge. The group splits up, with the Landick siblings following the tunnel, Hyde analyzing the slime, and the Skick Goseigers watching the news to determine the killer's pattern. Upon concluding their investigation, they soon encounter the culprit, Tomarezu of the monstrous Yuumajuu. The group's leaders, Makuin and Kinggon reveal themselves and join the fray, explaining that they had been sealed within the Erurei Box by ancient Gosei Angels millennia prior before they were recently released. Seeking to pollute the Earth to make it more habitable for them, the monsters overwhelm the Goseigers until a mysterious robotic figure called Gosei Knight arrives to help them repel the Yuumajuu leaders and defeat Tomarezu. Though the monster is suddenly enlarged, Gosei Knight transforms into the Groundion Headder to kill him before leaving. Meanwhile, Makuin and Kinggon reconvene with the individual responsible for enlarging Tomarezu and an old friend, Buredoran.
18	"The Earth Purifying Knight of Destiny"; Transliteration: "Hoshi o Kiyomeru Shukumei no Kishi" (Japanese: 地球を浄める宿命の騎士)	Naruhisa Arakawa	June 13, 2010
After learning more about the Yuumajuu and Gosei Knight from Master Head, the Goseigers learn Gosei Knight is attacking an industrial plant and its workers. Upon confronting him, he reveals that he originally worked with ancient Gosei Angels to fight the Yuumajuu millennia prior before he was separated from them and made a pact with the Earth itself to protect it from harm in exchange for his humanoid form. Meanwhile, Makuin revives a Yuumajuu called Zeibu so he can use his powers to brainwash a TV studio and broadcast his powers further. The Goseigers mobilize to stop him, but are distracted by Buredoran, who claims that he is actually a Yuumajuu who fled into space while Zeibu establishes a barrier. After Buredoran leaves, Gosei Knight arrives and gives the Goseigers five minutes to rescue the humans inside the studio. Despite heavy resistance from Beebe soldiers and Gosei Knight, the group eventually lure Zeibu outside, allowing Gosei Knight to defeat him. After Buredoran enlarges the monster, the Goseigers use their mecha to kill him while Gosei Knight leaves, still believing that saving humans is not part of his programming. Taking notice of this, Buredoran formulates a plan to take advantage of it.
19	"Gosei Knight Will Not Allow It"; Transliteration: "Gosei Naito wa Yurusanai" (Japanese: ゴセイナイトは許さない)	Saburo Yatsude	June 20, 2010
As the Goseigers discuss earning Gosei Knight's trust, Buredoran recruits a Yuumajuu called Giemurou to help him enact his plot. The monster obliges by using his ticks to capture people and lure out the Gosei warriors. Despite being temporarily overpowered, the monster succeeds in capturing Gosei Knight before retreating. The latter later awakens to find that Giemurou is siphoning his powers and using it to convert his captives into kappas to drain Earth's water supply and convert more people into kappas. Gosei Knight becomes crestfallen over being used to harm the Earth until the Goseigers arrive to rescue him and fight off the Yuumajuu. Seeing their determination to save the world, Gosei Knight frees himself and joins the fight. A retreating Buredoran enlarges Giemurou and temporarily negates the Goseigers' ability to summon their mecha. However, Gosei Knight summons his own Gosei Machines, combines with them to form Gosei Ground, and kills the monster. Afterward, the Goseigers ask Gosei Knight to join them, but he refuses over Alata's pleas that they share the same mission.
20	"Fall In Love Goseigers"; Transliteration: "Fōrin Rabu Goseijā" (Japanese: フォーリンラブ・ゴセイジャー)	Kento Shimoyama	June 27, 2010
After meeting a lovesick high school student named Takuya, Nozomu asks the Goseigers to help Takuya win the heart of his classmate Mizuki Takazaki. Meanwhile, Makuin revives a Yuumajuu called Pesaranza and tasks him with wreaking havoc via his ability to devour humans' persistent love. The next day, Pesaranza takes advantage of the Goseigers' work with Takuya to attack the latter's school, causing people to go crazy with love so he can drain the life from them. Nonetheless, the Goseigers are joined by Gosei Knight in eventually defeating the Yuumajuu. After killing the enlarged Pesaranza, the Goseigers watch Takuya befriend Mizuki from afar.
21	"Elegant Eri"; Transliteration: "Ereganto Eri" (Japanese: エレガント・エリ)	Michiko Yokote	July 4, 2010
The Gosei warriors respond to an attack by a Yuumajuu called Waraikozou, who is causing chaos with his ability to destroy machinery. While repelling him, a baker gets caught in the crossfire and ends up injured. Feeling guilty, Eri offers to take over his bakery and complete an order he was tasked with completing while he recovers despite her lack of cooking skills. A disgusted Gosei Knight scoffs at her efforts, though Hyde defends her. Once she is done, she brings flour to hinder Waraikozou's movements before joining her friends in defeating him. After killing the enlarged Yuumajuu, Gosei Knight questions the Goseigers' desire to make people smile while Makuin enlists a Yuumajuu who previously fought Groundion.
22	"Over the Rainbow"; Transliteration: "Ōbā Za Reinbō" (Japanese: オーバー・ザ・レインボー)	Michiko Yokote	July 18, 2010
Accepting Makuin's offer to settle his rivalry with Groundion, Uobouzu uses his shadow-eating powers to put people into comas and lure out the Gosei warriors. They soon arrive to stop him, but he overpowers the Goseigers and fights Gosei Knight to a standstill until the clouds force Uobouzu to retreat. Following this, Gosei Knight starts to believe that Gosei Angels have grown weaker since his time. The next day, Uobouzu renews his attack, but is ultimately defeated by Gosei Knight. After being enlarged by Buredoran, Uobouzu overpowers the Gosei warriors' mecha until they combine them to form Ground Gosei Great and kill the monster. Afterward, Gosei Knight accepts the Goseigers as allies, but advises them to continue training.
23	"Burn! Goseigers"; Transliteration: "Moero! Goseijā" (Japanese: 燃えろ！ゴセイジャー)	Naruhisa Arakawa	July 25, 2010
The female Goseigers head to the beach, but they and the other beachgoers are attacked by a Yuumajuu called Zaigo, who Kinggon sent to overheat people and accelerate the effects of global warming. The male Goseigers arrive soon after to repel Zaigo, though Hyde falls victim to the monster's effects too. Sometime later, Zaigo mounts a failed attack on an ecologically minded village while Kinggon kidnaps the female Goseigers and tries to kill them with fireworks. Nonetheless, the remaining Gosei warriors and Datas arrive to rescue their friends and defeat Zaigo. After using their mecha to kill the enlarged Yuumajuu, the Goseigers watch a fireworks show while Buredoran and Gosei Knight hear a distant roar and recognize its owner.
24	"The Miracle Attack Goseigers"; Transliteration: "Mirakuru Atakku Goseijā" (Japanese: ミラクルアタック・ゴセイジャー)	Naruhisa Arakawa	August 1, 2010
Buredoran locates the site of a powerful Gosei World weapon called the Abare Headder, but a barrier prevents him from going any further. Undeterred, he recruits a Yuumajuu called Semattarei to manipulate the Goseigers into helping him. Using his illusionary powers, Semattarei attacks the Goseigers until Gosei Knight arrives to help them, revealing Buredoran's plot to them in the process. While he holds off Semattarei, the Goseigers break the barrier and retrieve the Abare Headder, but Buredoran steals it. While regrouping, Master Head informs the Goseigers of the Abare Headder's origins, piquing Alata's curiosity. After Datas alerts them to Buredoran and Semattarei's return, the Goseigers mobilize to stop him. However, Buredoran uses the Abare Headder to enhance Semattarei's powers, making his illusions tangible. The latter summons phantoms of dead Yuumajuu to overwhelm the Goseigers until Alata reaches out to the Abare Headder, recognizing that it is afraid of its own power and offers it his friendship. The Headder transforms into a Miracle Headder and summons four more to enhance the Goseigers. Using their new super forms, they repel Buredoran and kill Semattarei. Upon returning to Makuin and Kinggon, Buredoran is reprimanded for his failure.
25	"Nostalgic Moune"; Transliteration: "Nosutarujikku Mone" (Japanese: ノスタルジック・モネ)	Kento Shimoyama	August 8, 2010
After imprisoning Buredoran for failing them, Makuin and Kinggon formulate a new plan to kill the Goseigers. Later that night, Moune experiences recurring visions of a woman calling out to her. Confident that she will be safe with the Miracle Headders' power, she secretly goes off on her own to find the visions' source. She soon discovers what appears to be her mother, who asks her not to reveal her presence to the others, including Agri. However, this leads to an argument between the Landick siblings after he calls out her strange behavior. During a later meeting, Moune's mother claims that she can bring her back to Gosei World. She soon realizes that she is being tricked before Gosei Knight rescues her and reveals the imposter as a Yuumajuu called Sarawareteiru. Joined by their friends, the Gosei warriors defeat the monster, then kill the enlarged Sarawareteiru with their mecha. Afterward, the Landick siblings reconcile, during which Agri notices that Moune is starting to mature.
26	"The Laughing Gosei Angels"; Transliteration: "Gosei Tenshi, Bakushō!" (Japanese: 護星天使、爆笑！)	Kento Shimoyama	August 15, 2010
While attending a comedy show, Hyde struggles to understand the jokes. Suddenly, a Yuumajuu called Hit kidnaps Moune and most of the audience via his gourd, which is capable of absorbing anyone who laughs in its vicinity. Joined by Gosei Knight, the Goseigers fight back, but Hit captures Eri and Agri before escaping. Believing Hyde interfered with the fight, Gosei Knight storms off. While regrouping, Hyde intends to use Alata as bait for Hit while Alata tries to make Hyde laugh. Hyde's laughter over word puns soon attracts Hit, whose presence attracts Gosei Knight in turn. Though Hit captures Alata, Hyde convinces Gosei Knight to help him put on a comedy show to make the monster laugh, forcing him to destroy his gourd and free his captives before he gets pulled in. Reunited, the Gosei warriors defeat Hit before killing the enlarged monster with their mecha. Afterward, Hyde makes himself laugh after using a word pun, to the others' dismay.
27	"Wake Up Agri!"; Transliteration: "Mezamero, Aguri!" (Japanese: 目覚めろ、アグリ！)	Michiko Yokote	August 22, 2010
Makuin releases Buredoran with a warning before telling him that Kinggon intends to replace him with a Yuumajuu called Jogon, who possesses seashells that cause anyone exposed to them to believe that everyone around them is talking about them behind their back. The Gosei warriors fight Jogon, but he uses one of his seashells on Agri before retreating. Under its effects, Agri falls into a depressive state until Gosei Knight helps him realize what happened and break the spell. Meanwhile, Buredoran secretly uses one of Jogon's seashells to make Kinggon believe that Makuin no longer has faith in him. Seemingly under its spell, Kinggon joins Jogon in fighting the Gosei warriors to prove his superiority over Makuin. They soon defeat the pair and use their mecha to kill an enlarged Jogon, unaware that Kinggon survived and went into hiding.
28	"A Father's Treasure"; Transliteration: "Otōsan no Takaramono" (Japanese: おとうさんの宝物)	Michiko Yokote	August 29, 2010
With Kinggon apparently eliminated, Buredoran attempts to earn Makuin's favor until the latter recruits a Yuumajuu called Pikarime to use her mind control powers to brainwash several children, including Nozomu. Unaware of what happened to him, Shuichirou believes Nozomu is becoming a delinquent and that he failed as a father. Alata assures him otherwise before leaving to help his friends battle Makuin and Pikarime. Upon learning that Nozomu and the other enthralled children are going to jump off a cliff, Shuichirou heads out to stop them and reaches out to Nozomu. Meanwhile, the Gosei warriors defeat Pikarime, though Buredoran saves Makuin and enlarges her. Nonetheless, the Gosei warriors use their mecha to kill her, breaking her spell. As the Goseigers escort the Amachis home, Makuin promotes Buredoran, who asks to borrow the Erurei Box for his latest plot against the Goseigers.
29	"The Goseigers are Sealed!"; Transliteration: "Goseijā o Fūin seyo!" (Japanese: ゴセイジャーを封印せよ！)	Michiko Yokote	September 5, 2010
Using his newly acquired position as Makuin's second-in-command, Buredoran asks to use the Erurei Box against the Goseigers. Despite his misgivings, Makuin agrees. Buredoran subsequently lures the Goseigers into a trap and seals the Miracle Headders in the box before leaving. The group is initially crestfallen until they learn from Master Head that a new Heaven's Tower is almost finished. Reinvigorated, the Goseigers join Gosei Knight in fighting the Yuumajuu to save the Miracle Headders when Kinggon suddenly resurfaces to seemingly challenge Makuin. During the fight, Buredoran tries to use the Erurei Box to seal everyone in it, only to discover he was given a counterfeit and that Makuin and Kinggon knew of his treachery. As Makuin reveals the real Erurei Box, Gosei Knight frees the Miracle Headders from it. Regaining their super forms, the Goseigers renew their attack, but Kinggon uses an unwilling Buredoran to shield him and Makuin. He then reveals that he stole the Beebe Bugs' hive and uses them to forcibly enlarge Buredoran. Though he initially overpowers them, the Gosei warriors eventually kill Buredoran. Despite their hard-fought victory, Gosei Knight reminds the others that their fight is not over yet.
30	"Romantic Eri"; Transliteration: "Romantikku Eri" (Japanese: ロマンティック・エリ)	Junko Kōmura	September 12, 2010
A week after defeating Buredoran, most of the Goseigers fret over the Yuumajuu's next move while Eri prepares for the Gosei Festival. Meanwhile, Makuin and Kinggon locate a dream-eating Yuumajuu called Elmgaim and use the Erurei Box to grant him the ability to eat people's souls, causing their comatose bodies to produce roots of despair and rot the Earth. Upon being alerted to his presence, the Gosei warriors fight Elmgaim, but he eats Eri's soul. Nonetheless, she encourages the monster's other victims not to lose hope while her allies lure Elmgaim into a trap to free them. Reunited, the Gosei warriors defeat Elmgaim before killing the enlarged Yuumajuu with their mecha. Afterward, the Goseigers celebrate the Gosei Festival while Makuin and Kinggon conduct further research into the Erurei Box.
31	"Never Give Up, Goseigers!"; Transliteration: "Nebā Gibu Appu! Goseijā" (Japanese: ネバーギブアップ！ゴセイジャー)	Naruhisa Arakawa	September 19, 2010
As Makuin and Kinggon complete their research on the Erurei Box, the Goseigers prepare for Nozomu's upcoming birthday until they are forced to leave to stop the Yuumajuu, who have spread Erurei Box-enhanced mold samples across the city to make people sick and now intend to use fear to strengthen them further. Despite heavy resistance, the Gosei Warriors eventually defeat the monsters. Kinggon enlarges Makuin, who overpowers their mecha and tries to weaken their resolve by telling them of humanity's horrors. However, Nozomu reminds the Gosei warriors that not all humans are evil. Reinvigorated, the group kill Makuin, destroying his mold. Afterward, the Goseigers resume preparing for Nozomu's birthday, unaware that Kinggon enlarged the Erurei Box and placed it atop the Tokyo Metropolitan Government Building.
32	"Perform the Ultimate Miracle!"; Transliteration: "Kyūkyoku no Kiseki o Okose!" (Japanese: 究極の奇跡を起こせ！)	Naruhisa Arakawa	September 26, 2010
As the Goseigers finish preparing for Nozomu's birthday, Datas interrupts them, revealing what Kinggon did with the Erurei Box. The group leave to join Gosei Knight in fighting Kinggon, who reveals that Makuin intended for the Goseigers to kill him so he can absorb the Miracle Headders' energy and regenerate inside the Erurei Box so he can create a "Yuuma Hole" to destroy Earth. While Gosei Knight holds off Kinggon, the Goseigers enter the Yuuma Hole, find Makuin's core, and permanently kill him. However, the Yuuma Hole closes in around them. Meanwhile, as a defeated Kinggon uses the Beebe Bugs to enlarge himself before discarding their hive, Master Head learns of the Goseigers' plight from Datas and sends them the Heaven's Tower's cornerstone. After the Miracle Headders transform it into a new Gosei Machine called Gosei Ultimate, the Goseigers use it to escape the Yuuma Hole before transforming it into a mecha to kill Kinggon. Despite learning that Master Head disappeared and the new Heaven's Tower can no longer be built without the cornerstone, the Goseigers celebrate Nozomu's birthday nevertheless. Elsewhere, the Beebe Bug hive sinks into the ocean.
33	"The Dreadful Matrintis Empire"; Transliteration: "Kyōfu no Matorintisu Teikoku" (Japanese: 恐怖のマトリンティス帝国)	Saburo Yatsude	October 3, 2010
Upon learning of Master Head's disappearance and the Goseigers being unable to return to Gosei World, Nozomu grows worried for his friends, though Alata, Hyde, and the Landick siblings assure him that everything will be fine while Eri desires to go home to share her experiences on Earth with other Gosei Angels. Suddenly, the Goseigers are alerted to an explosion caused by a "Matroid" called Zan-KT, a herald of the Matrintis Empire. Despite receiving help from Gosei Knight, the Goseigers are overwhelmed by the new foe and Nozomu gets caught in the crossfire. After ensuring Nozomu and Gosei Knight's safety, the Goseigers use their super forms to defeat Zan-KT. However, Matrintis emperor Robogorg and his Matroid aide Metal Alice arrive to use the Beebe Bugs they obtained to enlarge Zan-KT. After the Goseigers use Gosei Ultimate to destroy the Matroid, Nozomu vows to continue helping them.
34	"Gosei Knight Justice"; Transliteration: "Gosei Naito Jasutisu" (Japanese: ゴセイナイト・ジャスティス)	Michiko Yokote	October 10, 2010
As the Goseigers discover the Matrintis Empire has been spying on them, Metal Alice presents Zan-KT's data to Robogorg, who uses them to build an upgraded model called Zan-KT2 before deploying him and Metal Alice to fight the Gosei warriors. During the subsequent fight, Metal Alice reveals the Matrintis Empire intends to enslave humanity, causing Gosei Knight to question his purpose upon realizing that the Yuumajuu have been defeated. He considers fighting humanity due to the pollution they cause until Nozomu convinces him that humanity is worth saving. After Datas alerts the Gosei warriors to Zan-KT2's return, they eventually defeat him and destroy the enlarged Matroid with their mecha. Afterward, Gosei Knight vows to continue protecting the Earth alongside the Goseigers.
35	"Find the Perfect Leader!"; Transliteration: "Pāfekuto Rīdā o Sagase!" (Japanese: パーフェクトリーダーを探せ！)	Junko Kōmura	October 17, 2010
The Goseigers respond to attacks carried out by a Matroid called Zuteru-S, who was sent to capture humans and take them to a Matrintis labor camp, but he overwhelms them with his speed and their lack of leadership before escaping. With Master Head gone and Gosei Knight having discovered the camp, the Goseigers initially elect Hyde to lead them. As they rescue the prisoners and reengage Zuteru-S however, the leadership role gets passed on to Agri, Eri, and Moune. After the Matroid gets enlarged, Alata takes over and leads them in combining Gosei Great with Gosei Ultimate to form Ultimate Gosei Great and destroy Zuteru-S. Afterward, as his friends argue over what to have for dinner, Alata quietly addresses all their decisions.
36	"Run, Agri!"; Transliteration: "Hashire, Aguri!" (Japanese: 走れ、アグリ！)	Daisuke Ishibashi	October 24, 2010
While jogging, Agri encounters a runner named Naoto Nakamura, who dreams of joining a popular athletics group called Team Meteor, before he is called away to help his friends fight a Matroid called Bazaruso-LJ, who was sent to capture physically fit humans and convert them into cyborg soldiers. After failing to stop him, the Goseigers further their training, with Agri opting to undergo a rigorous training regimen so he can try out for Team Meteor in the hopes that Bazaruso-LJ will capture him and lead him to his captives. Eventually, his plan succeeds and Bazaruso-LJ captures him and Naoto. Upon alerting his friends, Agri rescues Naoto and the other captives before defeating the Matroid with Gosei Knight’s help. After the Gosei Warriors use their mecha to destroy the enlarged Bazaruso-LJ, Agri learns Naoto achieved his dream while recovering from his training.
37	"Excited Moune"; Transliteration: "Ekisaito Mone" (Japanese: エキサイト・モネ)	Michiko Yokote	October 31, 2010
While out running errands, Moune purchases a heath watch called a Vital Meter, which has been spreading across the city. However, she later finds that it is irremovable before Datas alerts the Goseigers to a Matrintis attack. Joined by Gosei Knight, they discover a Matroid called Adoburute-G is turning several humans into statues to decrease human resistance against his creators. During the subsequent fight, he discovers Moune is wearing one of his meters and reveals it will release petrification gas once the wearer's aggression reaches an optimal level. Due to her meter being dangerously close to activating, the Gosei warriors knock out Moune, retreat, and leave her in Nozomu and Datas' care while they search for Adoborute-G to make him deactivate the meter. While attempting to stay calm, Moune becomes inspired by Shuichirou's participation in a comedy contest to help her friends by maintaining a calm state of mind so she can defeat Adoborute-G, restoring his victims. After the Gosei warriors use their mecha to destroy the enlarged Matroid, Moune comforts Shuichirou after he loses the contest.
38	"Alice vs. Gosei Knight"; Transliteration: "Arisu Bāsasu Gosei Naito" (Japanese: アリスVSゴセイナイト)	Michiko Yokote	November 7, 2010
As Robogorg struggles to understand how the Goseigers are destroying his Matroids, Metal Alice offers to personally oversee the next mission. Meanwhile, Hyde helps Gosei Knight better understand humanity while Nozomu is excited to learn his mother, Hiroko, is returning home from work until he and Shuichiro learn Metal Alice is attacking the railway system, delaying Hiroko's train. The Gosei warriors battle Metal Alice until she suddenly retreats. Gosei Knight later learns the Matroid had placed a bomb on the bridge that Hiroko's train must cross. The Gosei warriors reengage Metal Alice, but she detonates the bomb anyway. Undeterred, the Goseigers summon the mecha Gosei Wonder to form a makeshift bridge. An enraged Metal Alice enlarges herself but is destroyed by Gosei Wonder. Afterward, Gosei Knight observes the Amachi family reunion while Robogorg rebuilds Metal Alice and installs a "Punishment Bomb" within her to ensure she does not fail him again.
39	"Epic Zero"; Transliteration: "Epikku Zero" (Japanese: エピック･ゼロ)	Michiko Yokote	November 14, 2010
Eri and Moune find themselves wondering what Nozomu wants to be when he grows up, leading to them discussing their childhood dreams with the others until they realize Alata is missing. Eri and Nozomu later find him helping civilians until Datas alerts the Goseigers to another Matrintis attack. They soon confront a Matroid called Bakutofuji-ER, who temporarily overpowers them with his ability to rewind time before Metal Alice arrives to announce the creation of Matrintis' new member, Buredoran, who Robogorg revived as the cyborg Buredo-RUN before erasing his memories save for his name and hatred for the Goseigers. Despite this turn of events, they successfully fight back until Metal Alice enlarges Bakutofuji-ER to protect Buredo-RUN. As the Gosei warriors use their mecha however, Buredo-RUN secretly uses the combatants' energies to send Alata back in time to before Warstar destroyed the Heaven's Tower. As he realizes what happened, the Matrintis Empire overwhelm the remaining Gosei warriors until Buredo-RUN malfunctions, forcing Metal Alice to take him back to Robogorg.
40	"Strong Alata"; Transliteration: "Sutorongu Arata" (Japanese: ストロング・アラタ)	Michiko Yokote	November 21, 2010
While recovering from the Matrintis Empire's latest attack, Nozomu and Datas reveal to the Gosei warriors that Alata is alive, albeit trapped in the past, before they are forced to fight Robogorg, who intends to gather more data on them. Meanwhile, Alata attempts to assemble the Goseigers early to save the Heaven's Tower, but experiences trouble with Hyde and the Landick siblings. Worsening matters, he learns Bakutofuji-ER was also sent back in time and had been reverted to normal size. With help from his fellow Goseigers, Alata eventually succeeds in sending himself and Bakutofuji-ER back to the present, emerging during the Gosei warriors' fight with Robogorg. Satisfied with the data he collected, the emperor leaves his subordinates to continue the fight, though the Gosei Warriors destroy Bakutofuji-ER and repel Metal Alice and Buredo-RUN. Afterward, Nozomu learns Alata's childhood dream is to protect the world.
41	"Exploding Bonds of Friendship!"; Transliteration: "Bakuhatsu! Nakama no Kizuna" (Japanese: 爆発！仲間の絆)	Kento Shimoyama	November 28, 2010
As the Goseigers grow concerned about Buredoran's return, Alata assures them that they will prevail before Datas alerts them to Metal Alice's presence. Upon confronting her, she deploys a seemingly defective Matroid called Ain-I to shield her from their attacks before retreating. Taking pity on him, Eri adopts the Matroid, renames him "Koro", and teaches him about friendship until Hyde and Agri learn a bomb was installed in him. Metal Alice soon returns to reveal Ain-I's true purpose was to study friendship before wiping his memory and activating his battle mode to make him fight the Goseigers. Reluctantly, Eri deactivates the Matroid, but Metal Alice enlarges him and activates his bomb. Eri summons Gosei Ultimate to take Ain-I into space, intending to sacrifice herself, but Ain-I reactivates and pushes her away at the last second before detonating. As the Goseigers mourn Koro, Robogorg tortures Metal Alice for acting on her own.
42	"Passionate Hyde"; Transliteration: "Jōnetsu Teki Haido" (Japanese: 情熱的ハイド)	Junko Kōmura	December 5, 2010
Following what happened with Koro, Hyde and Datas attempt to conduct further research into the Matrintis Empire. Amidst this however, Moune takes offense to Hyde calling Datas a machine before the Goseigers are alerted to another Matrintis attack. The group soon learn that Metal Alice and Buredo-RUN intend to fire a missile at the International Conference Center unless they get Datas. The Goseigers and Datas reluctantly comply, but Buredo-RUN fires the missile anyway, forcing the Goseigers to destroy it while he and Metal Alice escape with Datas. While regrouping, Hyde feverishly works to track him. He eventually locates Datas' energy signature, but when the Gosei warriors go to rescue him, they instead find a Matroid called Saroge-DT, who reveals he was reverse-engineered from Datas and given his knowledge on them before overwhelming them. After locating and rescuing Datas, Hyde uses his illusion powers to fool Saroge-DT's sensors, allowing Datas and the Gosei warriors to defeat him. After destroying the enlarged Matroid, Datas laments losing his memory files on the Matrintis base.
43	"The Empire's All-Out Attack"; Transliteration: "Teikoku Sōkōgeki" (Japanese: 帝国総攻撃)	Kento Shimoyama	December 12, 2010
Upon analyzing the data he has collected on the Goseigers, Robogorg prepares an all-out assault with Buredo-RUN, but dismisses Metal Alice, feeling that she has served her purpose. He then hijacks the country's communications to declare war on the Gosei warriors and humanity. In response, the Gosei warriors prepare as well. The next day, Robogorg sends in a Matroid army to weaken the Gosei warriors before deploying Buredo-RUN to negate their powers. The emperor soon arrives, revealing he used Buredoran's memories as part of his plot. As he overpowers them, Gosei Knight discovers he still has some power left and uses it to restore that of the Goseigers' before shutting down. Reinvigorated, they assume their super forms to face Robogorg.
44	"The Ultimate Final Battle"; Transliteration: "Kyūkyoku no Saishū Kessen" (Japanese: 究極の最終決戦)	Kento Shimoyama	December 19, 2010
The Goseigers send Gosei Knight home for repairs before fighting Robogorg and Buredo-RUN. The former attempts to use the latter as a suicide bomber, but Metal Alice arrives and convinces Robogorg to use her instead. However, she fails to kill Alata before her Punishment Bomb explodes, severely damaging her. Disgusted by Robogorg's callousness over this and his ideals, the Goseigers combine their weapons with that of Gosei Knight’s to defeat him. After Robogorg enlarges himself, Alata offers him a chance to stop, but the emperor refuses and activates his self-destruct function, intending to take the Goseigers and Earth with him. Nonetheless, a partially repaired Gosei Knight arrives to help the Goseigers use their mecha to destroy Robogorg's body before then. Though they discover the emperor's head is still active and that he has ordered Buredo-RUN to rebuild him, Buredo-RUN betrays him, revealing Metal Alice restored his memories before the fight and that he intentionally left Gosei Knight his powers. Robogorg realizes Buredo-RUN's true identity, but the latter destroys him before he can reveal it. After destroying Metal Alice, he takes his leave, promising the Gosei warriors that they will meet again.
45	"The Messiah is Born"; Transliteration: "Kyūseishu, Tanjō" (Japanese: 救星主、誕生)	Michiko Yokote	December 26, 2010
As the Goseigers prepare for New Year's, Alata calls for a meeting to review everything they know about Buredoran. Starting with how he was able to negate their powers amidst Robogorg's endgame, Nozomu reminds them of Buredoran's time with the Yuumajuu while Gosei Knight adds how he knew of and tried to control the Abare Headder. The Goseigers then theorize that Buredoran freed Makuin and Kinggon before recalling that he had also worked with Warstar and question why a Yuumajuu would travel to space. To the others' concern, Alata realizes Buredoran might not be a Yuumajuu. Suddenly, Master Head appears, having possessed Shuichirou after ending up in another dimension following the Goseigers' final battle with the Yuumajuu, to reveal that an ancient Gosei Angel of considerable power had sealed the Yuumajuu leaders, which troubles Gosei Knight. Meanwhile, Buredo-RUN takes Robogorg's base for himself and uses his data to review the Goseigers. After pondering all that he took from the Matrintis Empire, Yuumajuu, and Warstar, he decides to confront them. During the subsequent fight, he counters their powers once more before revealing himself as a fallen Gosei Angel called Brajira.
46	"Gosei Knight is Targeted"; Transliteration: "Nerawareta Gosei Naito" (Japanese: 狙われたゴセイナイト)	Michiko Yokote	January 9, 2011
Following Brajira's reveal, Alata demands to know his motives. The former explains that he wants to destroy and recreate Earth in his image because Gosei World had failed to save the planet from itself. He then reveals that millennia prior, he sealed the Yuumajuu leaders and previously commanded Groundion before his former comrades persecuted him and he used an imperfect Gosei World technique to travel to the present, which mutated him. Nevertheless, he joined the Goseigers' various enemies to manipulate them into stopping Gosei World from interfering with his "Earth Salvation Plan", using his powers to assume appropriate forms all throughout. He then summons a multi-headed "Dark Headder" monster called Namono-Gatari to fight the Goseigers while he kidnaps Gosei Knight. While regrouping, Master Head warns the Goseigers that Gosei Knight is dying after giving most of his power to them and Brajira intends to use the last of it. After reviewing their fight with Namono-Gatari, the Landick siblings reengage the monster and weaken him before joining their friends in killing the enlarged Namono-Gatari.
47	"The Trap of the Earth Salvation Plan"; Transliteration: "Chikyū Kyūsei Keikaku no Wana" (Japanese: 地球救星計画の罠)	Michiko Yokote	January 16, 2011
As the Goseigers review their fight with Brajira, Nozomu fears that Gosei Knight joined him willingly. After Datas alerts them to the monster's return, the group confront him, during which he reveals two more Dark Headders, Bari-Boru-Dara and Lo-O-Za-Ri, and Dark Gosei Knight, who he corrupted with his Dark Gosei Power. Despite their best efforts, the Goseigers fail to reach their friend before Brajira's group overwhelm them and leave. Nozomu worries that Gosei Knight is beyond saving, but Alata and Hyde believe otherwise. Upon being alerted to Brajira's group's return, the Goseigers fight them once more, during which Nozomu arrives and overhears Brajira's intent to let the Goseigers win. The boy tries to warn them, but Brajira injures him, revealing that he killed his Gosei Angel allies and stole their powers to seal the Yuumajuu leaders before enlarging Bari-Boru-Dara. The Goseigers use their mecha to kill the Dark Headder. However, they later learn that his and Namono-Gatari's essences have transformed into giant elemental wedges and that Brajira only needs one more to enact his "Nega End" ceremony.
48	"The Fighting Gosei Power"; Transliteration: "Tatakau Gosei Pawā" (Japanese: 闘うゴセイパワー)	Michiko Yokote	January 23, 2011
As the Goseigers attend to Nozomu's injuries, Master Head informs them that Brajira's Nega End ceremony is based on a forbidden Gosei World technique originally meant to restore life, which Brajira reworked to end life instead. Upon learning of Brajira's return, Eri stays behind with Datas to heal Nozomu while the others leave to fight the monster and Dark Gosei Knight until Alata stops his friends, concerned that Brajira intends to sacrifice Dark Gosei Knight to create the last wedge. As Alata uses his Gosei Power to purify Gosei Knight, the others are joined by Eri and Datas in fighting and killing the now enlarged Lo-O-Za-Ri. While regrouping, the Gosei warriors learn Master Head told Shuichirou the truth about them before realizing too late that Lo-O-Za-Ri turned into the last wedge and Brajira used Gosei Knight as a distraction.
49	"Fight Towards the Future"; Transliteration: "Mirai e no Tatakai" (Japanese: 未来への戦い)	Michiko Yokote	January 30, 2011
With the last wedge erected, Brajira prepares to enact the Nega End ceremony. Though he is confronted by the ghosts of Mons Drake, Makuin, Kinggon, and Robogorg as well as Gosei Knight, he easily defeats the ghosts before destroying his base to impede Gosei Knight. Meanwhile, the Goseigers formulate a plan to stop Brajira. They later rescue Gosei Knight before he, Master Head, and Shuichirou reveal Brajira will begin his plot during an upcoming solar eclipse. While the Goseigers confront Brajira, Gosei Knight, Datas, and Master Head use their mecha to stop the wedges. However, Brajira easily defeats the Goseigers. In response, they try to sacrifice their powers and give them to Alata so he can defeat Brajira, but the former refuses, opting to use teamwork instead.
50	"Protecting the Planet is an Angel's Mission"; Transliteration: "Hoshi o Mamoru wa Tenshi no Shimei" (Japanese: 地球を護るは天使の使命)	Michiko Yokote	February 6, 2011
Resolute in stopping him, the Goseigers renew their fight with Brajira as the eclipse reaches its peak. Undeterred, he enlarges himself, but they use their mecha to defeat him as the eclipse passes. Reverting to normal size, he reveals he was the last sacrifice needed to finish the Nega End ceremony before dying. As his Dark Gosei Power activates the wedges and overpowers Master Head's group, the Goseigers unlock their powers' full potential and use it to simultaneously stop the Nega End ceremony and restore the Heaven's Tower. Now that they are fully-fledged Gosei Angels, Master Head tells the Goseigers that they can finally return home, though they decide to stay on Earth a while longer to see more of what the planet has to offer and live out their dreams. After Master Head accepts, the Goseigers bid farewell to the Amachis and go their separate ways while Gosei Knight goes into hibernation to restore his full power.
