= Adire =

Adire may refer to:

- One of the Enochian angels
- Adire (textile art), a style of decorated Nigerian Yoruba textiles
- Adire Legal Professional Corporation, a Japanese law firm
- Adire (film), 2023 Nigerian film
