= Shinjuku Mitsui Building =

Skyscraper in Tokyo, Japan

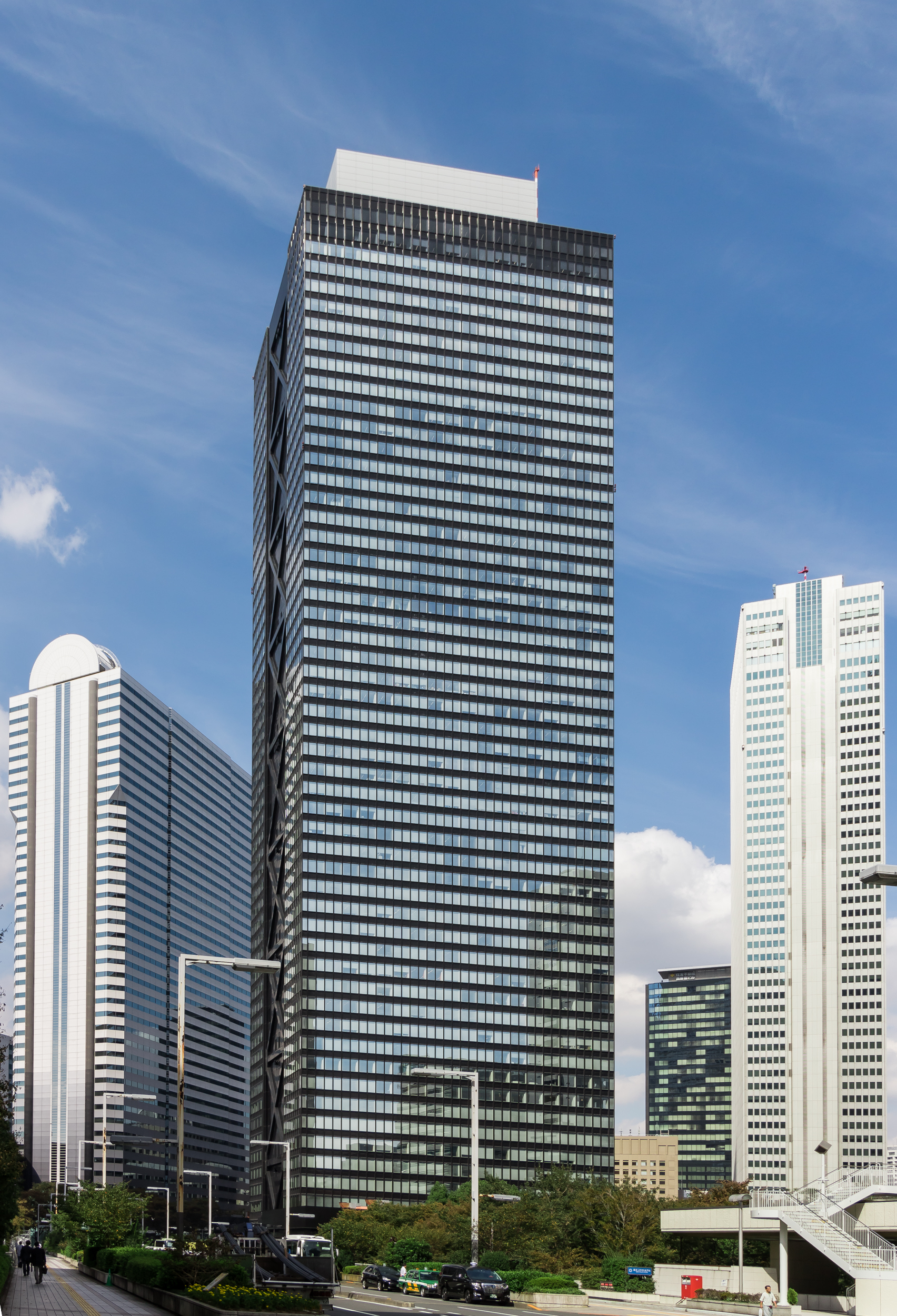
- Shinjuku Mitsui Building in 2018

General information
- Type: Office
- Location: Shinjuku, Tokyo, Japan
- Coordinates: 35.691898°N 139.693903°E
- Construction started: 1972
- Completed: 1974
- Opening: September 1974
- Owner: Mitsui Fudosan

Height
- Architectural: 224.9 m (738 ft)
- Roof: 212.1 m (696 ft)

Technical details
- Floor count: 55
- Floor area: 176,671 m^{2} (1,901,670 sq ft)

Design and construction
- Architect: Nihon Sekkei
- Developer: Mitsui Fudosan
- Structural engineer: Kiyoshi Mutō

The Shinjuku Mitsui Building (新宿三井ビル, Shinjuku Mitsui Biru) is a high-rise building in Nishi-Shinjuku, Shinjuku, Tokyo. It is owned by Mitsui Fudosan. It was the tallest building in Tokyo and Japan from September 1974 to March 1978, when Sunshine 60 was completed.

It was built in the style of high-rise buildings that were being built in the United States in the 1970s. It is notable for the black diagonal braces on its east and west facades. At the base of the skyscraper is a sunken garden and a surprisingly large plaza. In addition to the sunken garden, there is also a roof-top garden.

With its black facades, Shinjuku Mitsui Building stands out among the skyscrapers in Shinjuku. It is located next to the Shinjuku Center Building, which is two meters lower but appears to be taller because its first floor is located on higher ground. It made an appearance in the 1984 film The Return of Godzilla.

== Structure ==
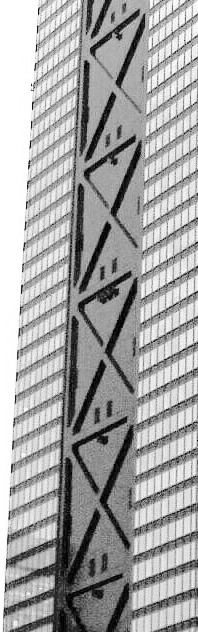
X-shaped braces on west side

The building's height is 212 metres (696 ft) to the top of the roof, and 225 metres (738 ft) to the architectural top. Its entrance lobby is on the second floor. The X-shaped steel braces on the side of the building serve as seismic reinforcement and also as braces for the doors of the machine rooms at each end of every floor. The machine room doors are 4–5 floors tall, for replacement of equipment such as air-conditioners. As in the older Keio Plaza Hotel, some fire escape exits are exposed outside the building to prevent smoke from accumulating in the case of fire.

In 2013, Mitsui Fudosan and Kajima Corporation began installing six massive pendulums on the roof of the building to counter long period ground motion. The pendulums will reduce magnitude of building motion by half or more during a major earthquake, such as the Great East Japan earthquake of 2011.

== Tenants ==
Capcom has its Tokyo offices in the building.

The top 55th floor was formerly occupied by a Chinese restaurant called the Mandarin Palace, but now it houses tenant offices. The 54th floor has a restaurant and a club called "Shinjuku Mitsui Club" for current and former employees of the Mitsui Group and their relatives. There is no observation deck open to the public.

Other floors occupied by tenant office space, except for the B1 to 5th floors, which house banks, restaurants, dental offices, and so on.

- B1: Ministop, Starbucks, Doutor Coffee, restaurants for Okinawan, Indian, Thai, Mandarin, and Korean cuisine
- 1st floor: Royal Host, Post office, Seiko Epson, Mitsui Fudoson Realty, Kyokuto Securities Co., Delicatessen
- 2nd floor: Sizzler, Sumitomo Mitsui Banking Corporation
- 3rd floor: Restaurants and Izakaya
- 4th-5th floors: Clinics, Dental Offices, Medical Center
- 54th floor: Shinjuku Mitsui Club

== Access ==
- 8 minutes by foot from Shinjuku Station
- 1 minute by foot Toei Ōedo Line
- 2 minutes by foot from Tokyo Metro Marunouchi Line
- Parking: Yes (fee)

Records
Preceded by Shinjuku Sumitomo Building	Tallest building in Japan; 225 m (738 ft); 1974–1978	Succeeded by Sunshine 60
Preceded by Shinjuku Sumitomo Building	Tallest building in Tokyo; 225 m (738 ft); 1974–1978	Succeeded by Sunshine 60
