= Adire Legal Professional Corporation =

Japanese law firm

- Native name

Japanese name
- Kanji: 弁護士法人アディーレ法律事務所
Transcriptions
- Revised Hepburn: Bengoshi Hōjin Adīre Hōritsu Jimusho
- Industry: Legal
- Founded: October 2004; 21 years ago
- Founder: Yukito Ishimaru (managing partner)
- Headquarters: Sunshine 60 building, Ikebukuro, Tokyo, Japan
- Number of locations: 50 (2013)
- Website: www.adire.jp

Adire Legal Professional Corporation (弁護士法人アディーレ法律事務所, Bengoshi Hōjin Adīre Hōritsu Jimusho) is a Japanese law firm.

As of 2016 it was the sixth-largest law firm in Japan by number of lawyers, with 160 attorneys on staff. It also has the most offices of any Japanese law firm in history; in July 2013, it opened its 49th and 50th offices in Nagasaki and Sasebo. The firm eventually plans to have offices in each of the 235 courthouse locations in Japan. It is headquartered in the Sunshine 60 building in Ikebukuro, Tokyo.

The firm's focus is on personal and corporate bankruptcy and debt restructuring. As of 2009 the firm was handling over 2,000 new debt restructuring cases each month. In recent years, the firm has diversified its practice into automobile accidents, divorces and other areas due to a gradual decline in debt restructuring work.

== History ==
Yukito Ishimaru established the firm in October 2004 and serves as its managing partner. He had been hired as a new graduate at Sega in 1995 and was stationed as the assistant manager of a video arcade in Obihiro, Hokkaido, but received a suspended prison sentence and lost his job less than a year later after being arrested three times for drunk driving. His experience with his own barely-competent lawyer inspired him to become a lawyer and establish the Adire firm.

Ishimaru and the firm received a reprimand from the Tokyo Bar Association in 2010 after it was found that the firm had failed to file for bankruptcy on behalf of a corporate client more than two years after being asked to do so.

The firm was penalized by the Japanese Consumer Affairs Agency in 2016 in relation to its advertising of debt adjustment services, on the basis that the advertisements offered purportedly one-month, limited-time fee discounts that were actually offered continuously for nearly five years. Following the agency's action, several regional bar associations decided that the firm's actions warranted disciplinary action against the firm and several of its lawyers.
