= Shinjuku Sumitomo Building =

Skyscraper in Tokyo, Japan

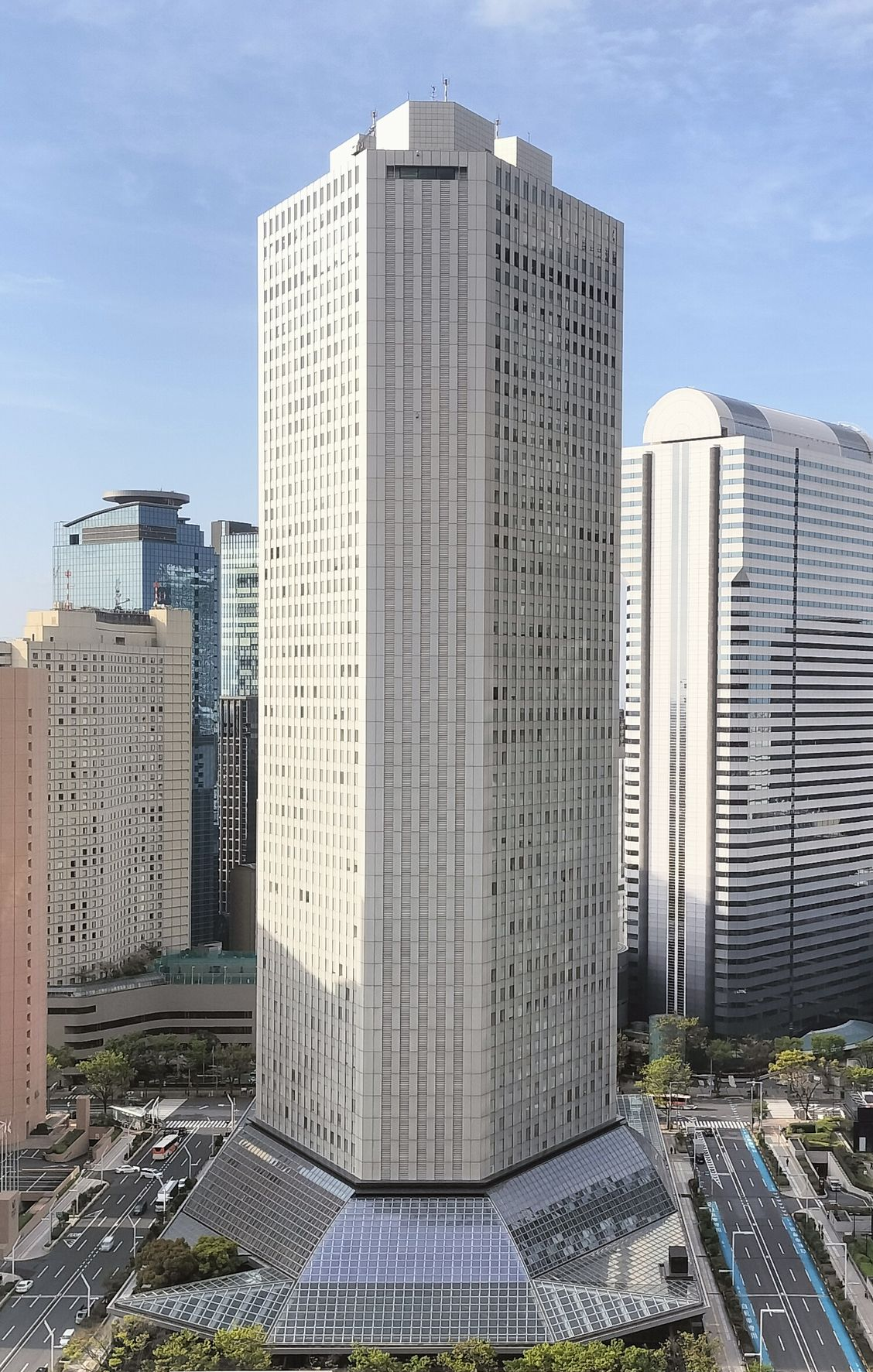
- Interactive map of the Shinjuku Sumitomo Building area

General information
- Status: Completed
- Location: Shinjuku, Tokyo, Japan
- Coordinates: 35°41′29″N 139°41′33″E
- Completed: March 6, 1974

Height
- Roof: 210.3 m (690 ft)

Technical details
- Floor count: 52

Shinjuku Sumitomo Building (新宿住友ビルディング, Shinjuku Sumitomo Birudingu) is a 212 m (696 ft) building in Nishi-Shinjuku, Shinjuku, Tokyo, Japan.

== Design ==
The building's three-sided construction makes good use of available space, yet the building's design sacrifices valuable floor space by including a massive atrium running the entire height of the building. The building's most recognizable characteristic is its shape and structure. It is most simply described as triangular (a more apt description would be a triangle with all the corners cut off), hence why one of its nicknames is 'the Triangle'. Also distinctive is the visible emergency elevator, which is used to transport cargo and not everyday passengers.

== Development ==
Construction began in November 1971 and was finished on March 6, 1974. At the time of its completion, its elevators were the fastest in the world at 540 meters per minute. It was the tallest building in Japan and Asia from March to September 1974, when it was surpassed by the nearby Shinjuku Mitsui Building. It was developed by Sumitomo Realty & Development, the real estate arm of the Sumitomo Group, and previously housed Sumitomo Realty's headquarters.

A pioneering skyscraper in Shinjuku, many companies are tenants of the building, as well as several restaurants. The free observation deck on the 51st floor was closed on April 1, 2017.

== Popular culture ==
In the 1984 film The Return of Godzilla, the Sumitomo Building was knocked over by Godzilla, crushing and breaking the Super X. Also, in the Doraemon film Doraemon: Nobita and the Steel Troops (ドラえもん のび太と鉄人兵団, Doraemon: Nobita to Tetsujin Heidan), the building was accidentally destroyed in the World Inside the Mirror by the huge robot Zanda Claus.

== See also ==
- List of tallest structures in Japan

Records
Preceded by Keio Plaza Hotel North Tower	Tallest building in Japan; 210 m (690 ft); March 1974–September 1974	Succeeded by Shinjuku Mitsui Building
Preceded by Keio Plaza Hotel North Tower	Tallest building in Tokyo; 210 m (690 ft); March 1974–September 1974	Succeeded by Shinjuku Mitsui Building
