= Shinjuku NS Building =

Tower block in Tokyo

- 新宿NSビル
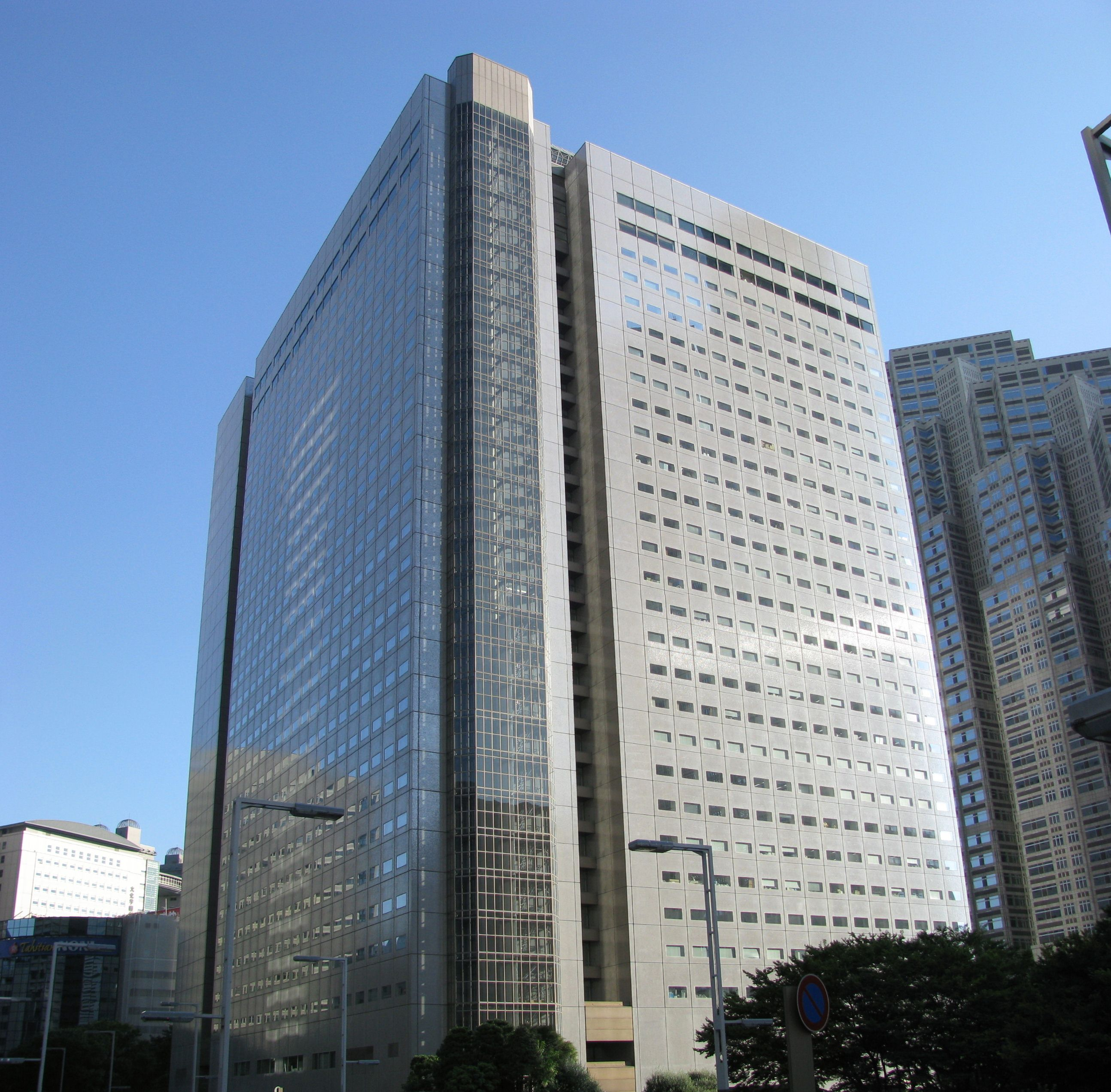
- Interactive map of the Shinjuku NS Building area

General information
- Status: Completed
- Location: 2-4-1 Nishi-Shinjuku; Shinjuku, Tokyo, Japan
- Coordinates: 35°41′36″N 139°41′35.5″E
- Construction started: 1979
- Completed: 1982

Height
- Roof: 134 meters (440 ft)

Technical details
- Floor count: 30 above ground 3 below ground
- Floor area: 166,768 m^{2} (1,795,100 sq ft)

Design and construction
- Architect: Nikken Sekkei
- Developer: Nippon Life Insurance Company; Sumitomo Realty & Development
- Main contractor: Taisei Corporation

The Shinjuku NS Building (新宿NSビル, Shinjuku Enu Esu Biru) is a skyscraper located in Shinjuku, Tokyo, Japan. The name comes from co-developers, Nihon Seimei and Sumitomo. Construction of the 134 metre, 30-story skyscraper was completed in 1982. It made an appearance in the film The Return of Godzilla (1984).

Sumitomo Realty & Development is headquartered in the building.
