= Izumi Garden Tower =

Skyscraper in Japan

- 泉ガーデンタワー
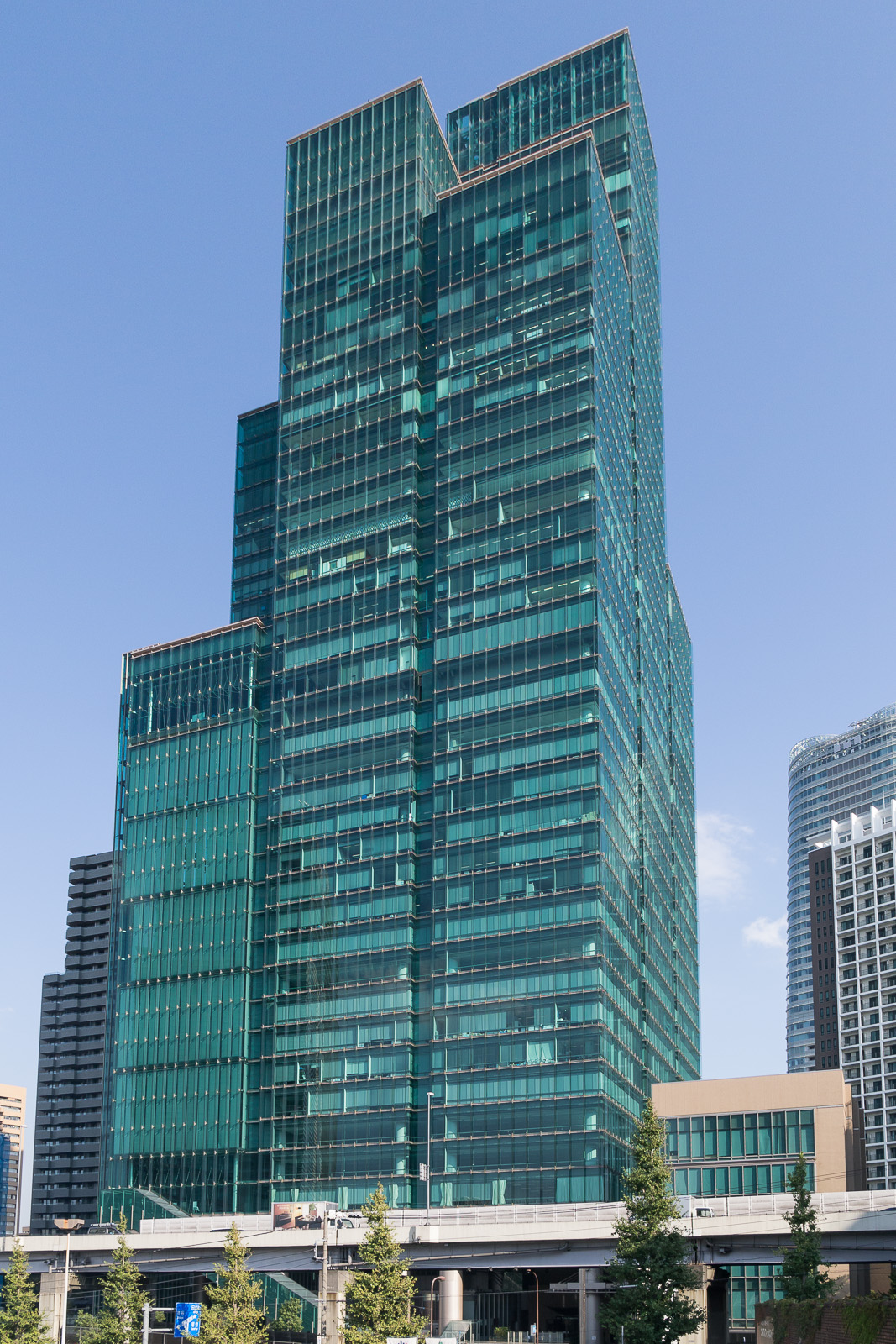
- The Izumi Garden Tower in 2012

General information
- Location: Roppongi, Tokyo, Japan
- Coordinates: 35.66467°N 139.73938°E
- Construction started: 1999
- Completed: 2002

Height
- Roof: 201 m (659 ft)

Technical details
- Floor count: 45

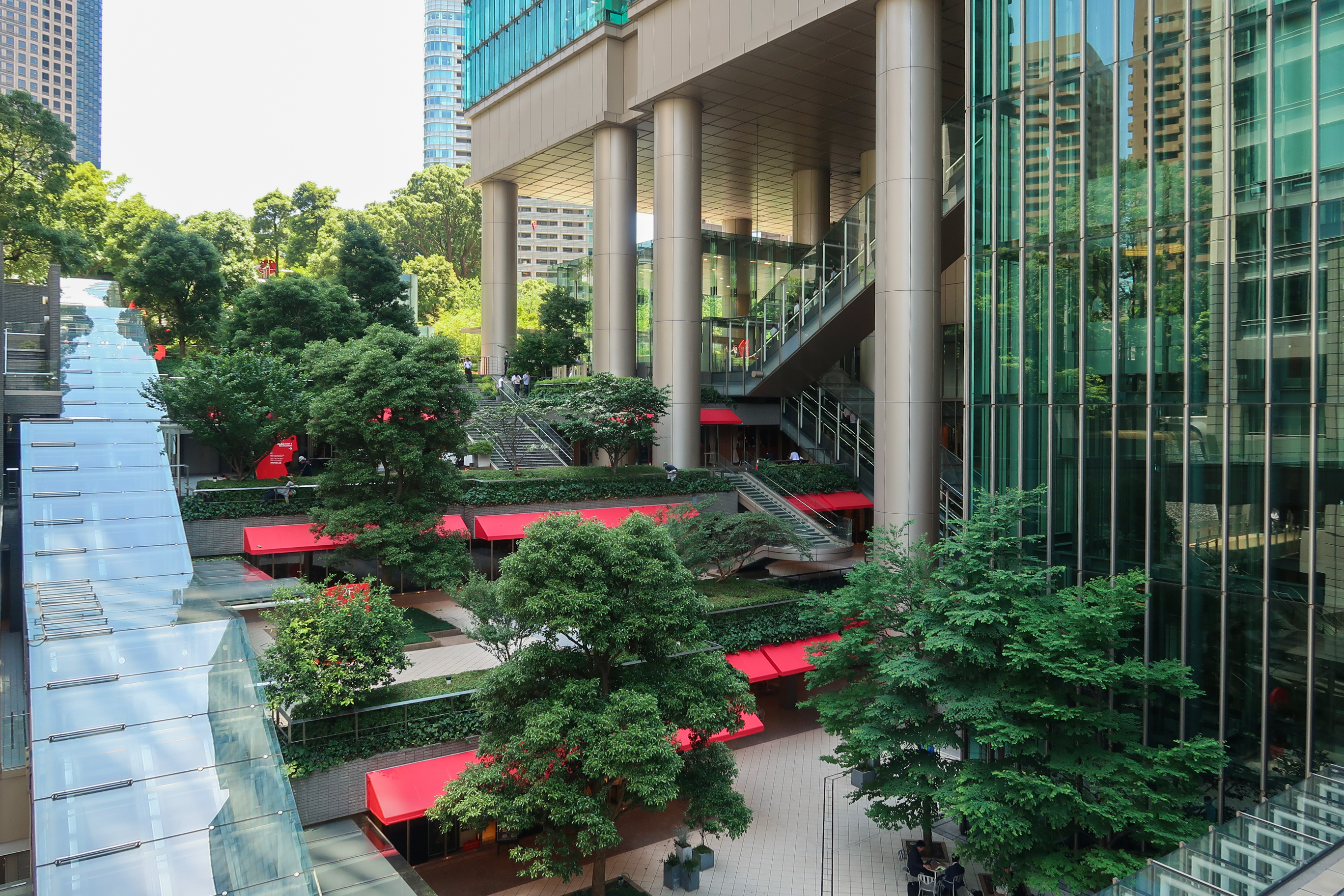
Izumi Garden Terrace

The Izumi Garden Tower (泉ガーデンタワー, Izumi Gāden Tawā, Spring Garden Tower) is a 201 m (roughly 659 ft) high-rise building in the Roppongi district of Tokyo. The tower features a hotel, apartments, a fitness center, offices, shops and restaurants. When construction was completed in 2002, the tower was the tallest building in Minato-ku, although it has since been surpassed by the Roppongi Hills Mori Tower.

The basement of the Izumi Garden Tower is directly connected to Roppongi-itchōme Station on the Tokyo Metro Namboku Line.

== Office tenants ==
- SBI Holdings, 13th–14th, 17th–23rd floors
- Lombard Odier & Cie, 41st floor
- Avex Group, 36th floor (since October 1, 2014)
- Naturally Plus, 35th floor
- RealWorld Inc., 34th floor
- LGT Bank, 33rd floor
- Davis Polk & Wardwell, 33rd floor
- WCL Co., Ltd., 30th floor
- Orrick, Herrington & Sutcliffe, 28th floor
- Credit Suisse, 24th–27th floors
- Skadden, Arps, Slate, Meagher & Flom, 37th floor
- Morningstar, 20th floor
- Electronic Arts, 18th floor
- KPMG, 11th and 12th floors
- PacketVideo Japan Corporation, 10th and 13th floors
- Colt Technology Services Co. Ltd, 27th floor
- Hays Specialist Recruitment Japan, 28th floor

Floor unconfirmed:

- E-Trade

== Izumi Garden Residence ==
Linked to Izumi Garden Tower by means of a central court and escalator system is Izumi Garden Residence, a 32-storey high-rise luxury apartment complex that caters to affluent local and foreign families.

== Other amenities ==
Izumi Tower and its central court contain several amenities and restaurants, including a convenience center, bank, book store, clinic, and hairdresser, as well as the following:

- Fitness Club Esforta
- Paul (bakery and cafe)
- Selfridge Cafe
- Tully's Coffee
- Ma Chambre (French restaurant)
- Tesoro Spanish Restaurant
- Warung Bali (Balinese restaurant)
- 3rd Burger
- Doctors
- Dentist
- Photo Booth
- Postbox
