= Tokyo Metropolitan Government Building =

Building in Nishi-Shinjuku, Tokyo, Japan

- 東京都庁舎
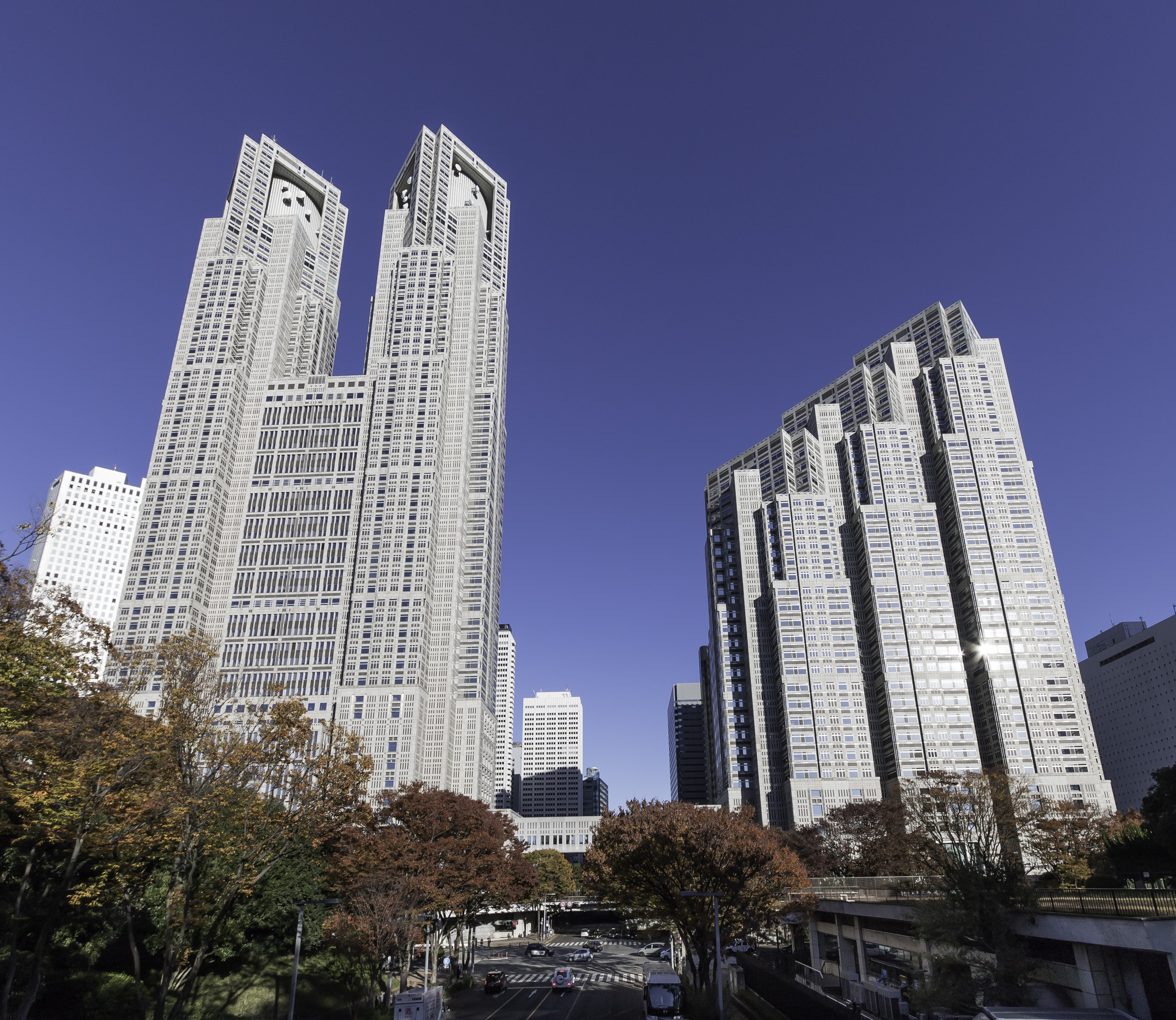
- Interactive map of the Tokyo Metropolitan Government Building area

Record height
- Tallest in Japan from 1991 to 1993^{[I]}
- Preceded by: Sunshine 60
- Surpassed by: Yokohama Landmark Tower

General information
- Status: Completed
- Type: Prefecture building
- Location: 2-8-1 Nishishinjuku, Shinjuku, Tokyo 163-8001 Japan
- Coordinates: 35°41′23″N 139°41′32″E
- Construction started: April 1988
- Completed: December 1990
- Opening: 1991; 35 years ago
- Cost: ¥157 billion
- Owner: Tokyo Metropolitan Government

Height
- Roof: 242.9 meters (797 ft)

Technical details
- Floor count: 48
- Floor area: 195,764 m^{2} (2,107,190 sq ft)

Design and construction
- Architect: Kenzo Tange
- Structural engineer: Kiyoshi Mutō

The Tokyo Metropolitan Government Building (東京都庁舎, Tōkyō-to Chōsha), also referred to as the Tochō (都庁) for short, is the seat of the Tokyo Metropolitan Government, which governs the special wards, cities, towns, and villages that constitute the Tokyo Metropolis.

Located in Shinjuku ward, the building was designed by architect Kenzo Tange. It consists of a complex of three structures, each taking up a city block. The tallest of the three is the Tokyo Metropolitan Government Building No.1, a tower 48 stories tall that splits into two sections at the 33rd floor. The building also has three levels below ground. The design of the building was meant to resemble an integrated circuit, while also evoking the look of a Gothic cathedral. It is the tallest city hall in the world.

The other two buildings in the complex are the eight-story Tokyo Metropolitan Assembly Building (including one underground floor) and Tokyo Metropolitan Government Building No. 2, which has 37 stories including three below ground.

The two panoramic observation decks, one in each tower on floor 45 (202 meters (663 ft) high), are free of charge to the public and contain gift shops and cafes. The two observation decks are open between 9:30 and 22:00 on alternating days.

== History ==
The building was designed by Kenzo Tange and finished in December 1990 at the expense of ¥157 billion (about US$1 billion) of public money. It replaced the old city hall at Yūrakuchō, which was built in 1957 and also designed by Tange, which is now the site of the Tokyo International Forum.

At 242.9 meters (797 ft), it was the tallest building by roof height in Tokyo until 2007, when the Midtown Tower was completed.

In February 2024, the building was recognized by the Guinness World Records for having the world's largest projection mapping display.

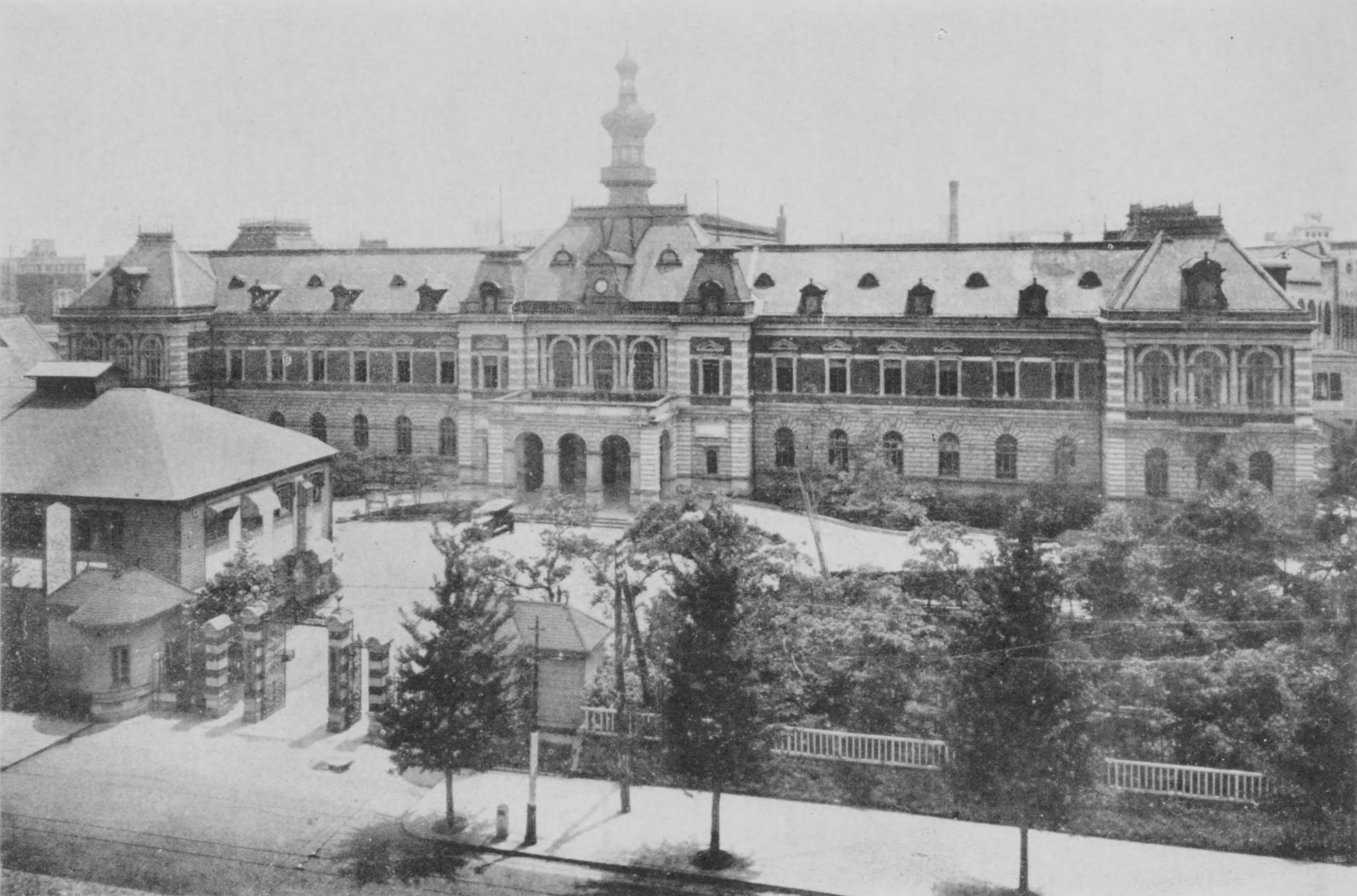
The first Tokyo Metropolitan Government Building in the 1930s. It was damaged during World War II.

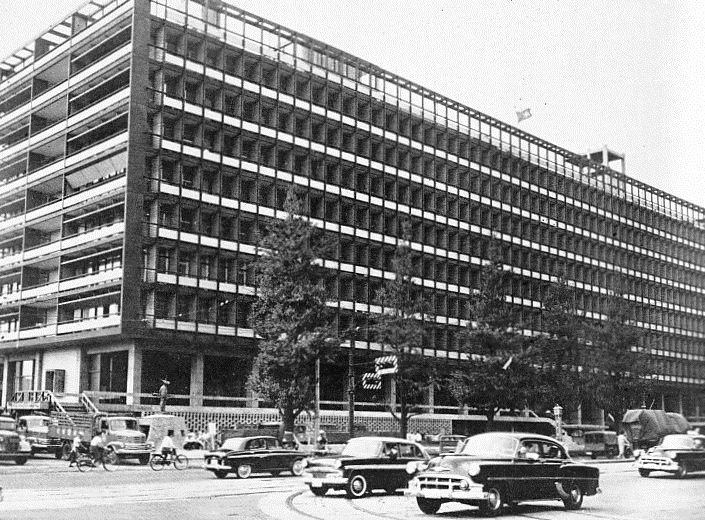
The previous Tokyo Metropolitan Government Building, between 1957 and 1991, in Chiyoda district

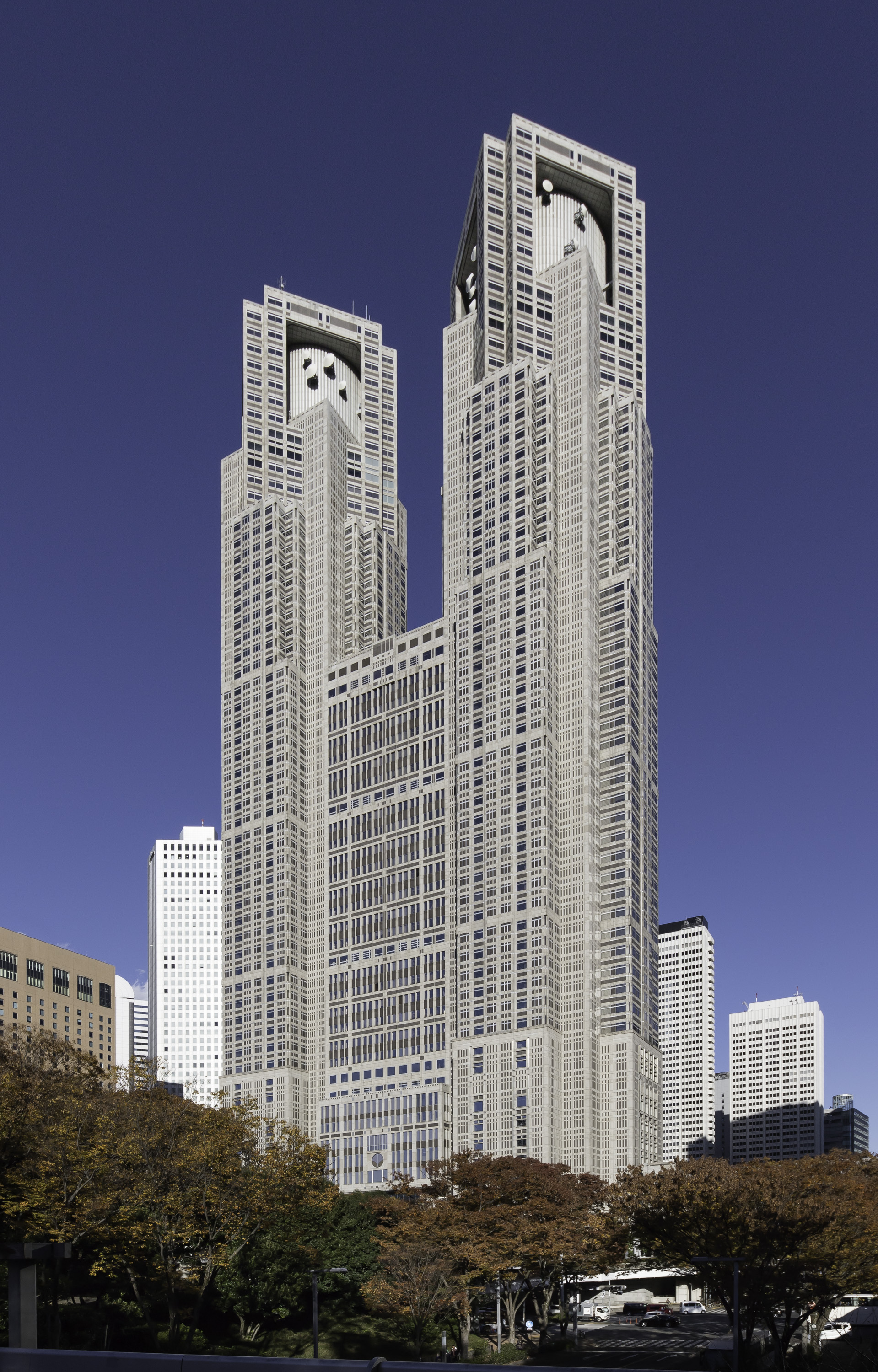
Tokyo Metropolitan Government Building No. 1 (Tōkyō-tochō daiichi honchōsha)

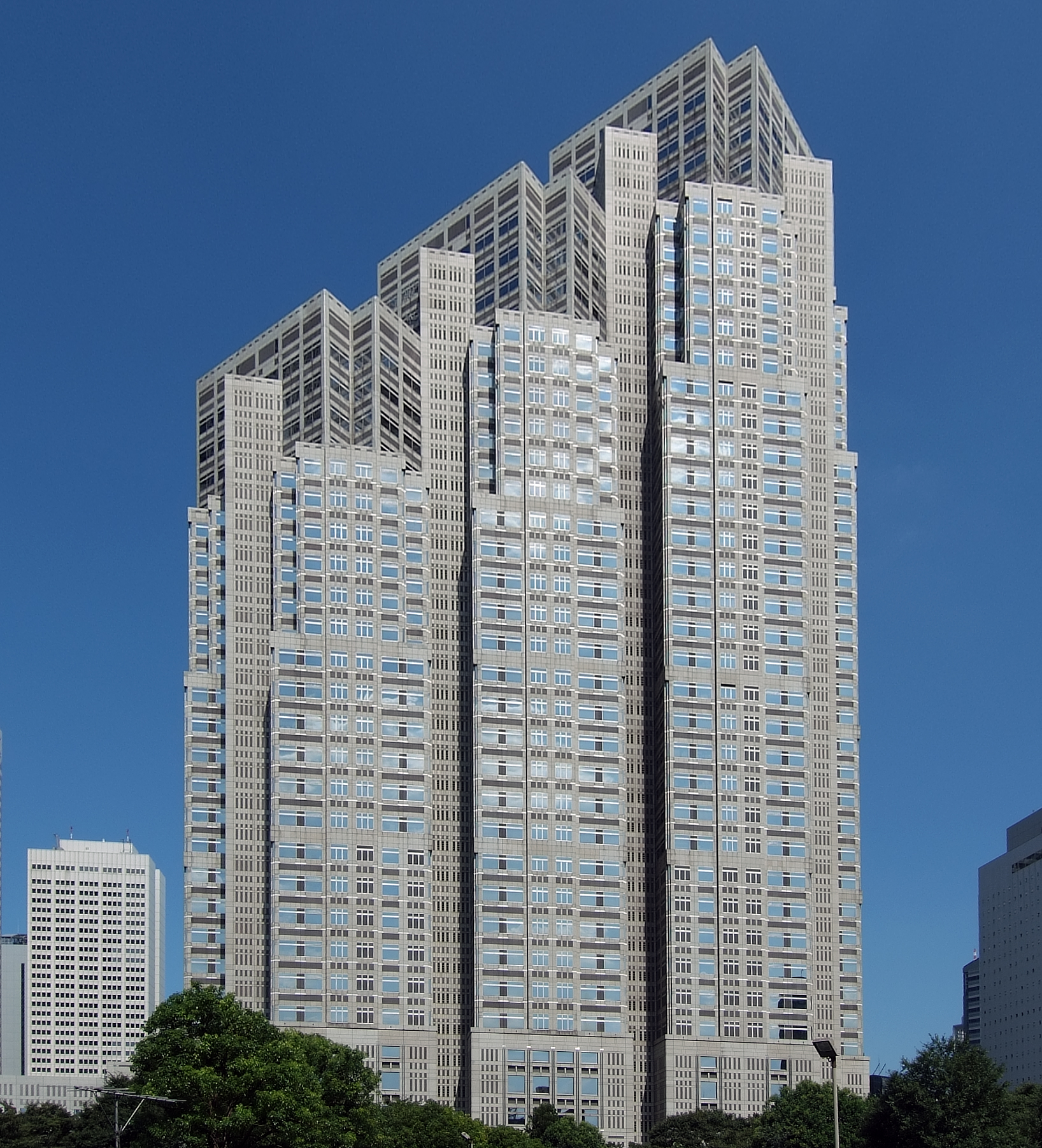
Tokyo Metropolitan Government Building No. 2 (Tōkyō-tochō daini honchōsha)

== See also ==
- List of tallest structures in Tokyo
- List of tallest structures in Japan
- Tochōmae Station

Records
Preceded by Sunshine 60	Tallest building in Japan; 243 m (797 ft); 1990–1993	Succeeded by Yokohama Landmark Tower
Preceded by Sunshine 60	Tallest building in Tokyo; 243 m (797 ft); 1990–2007	Succeeded by Midtown Tower
