= Keio Plaza Hotel =

Hotel chain in Japan

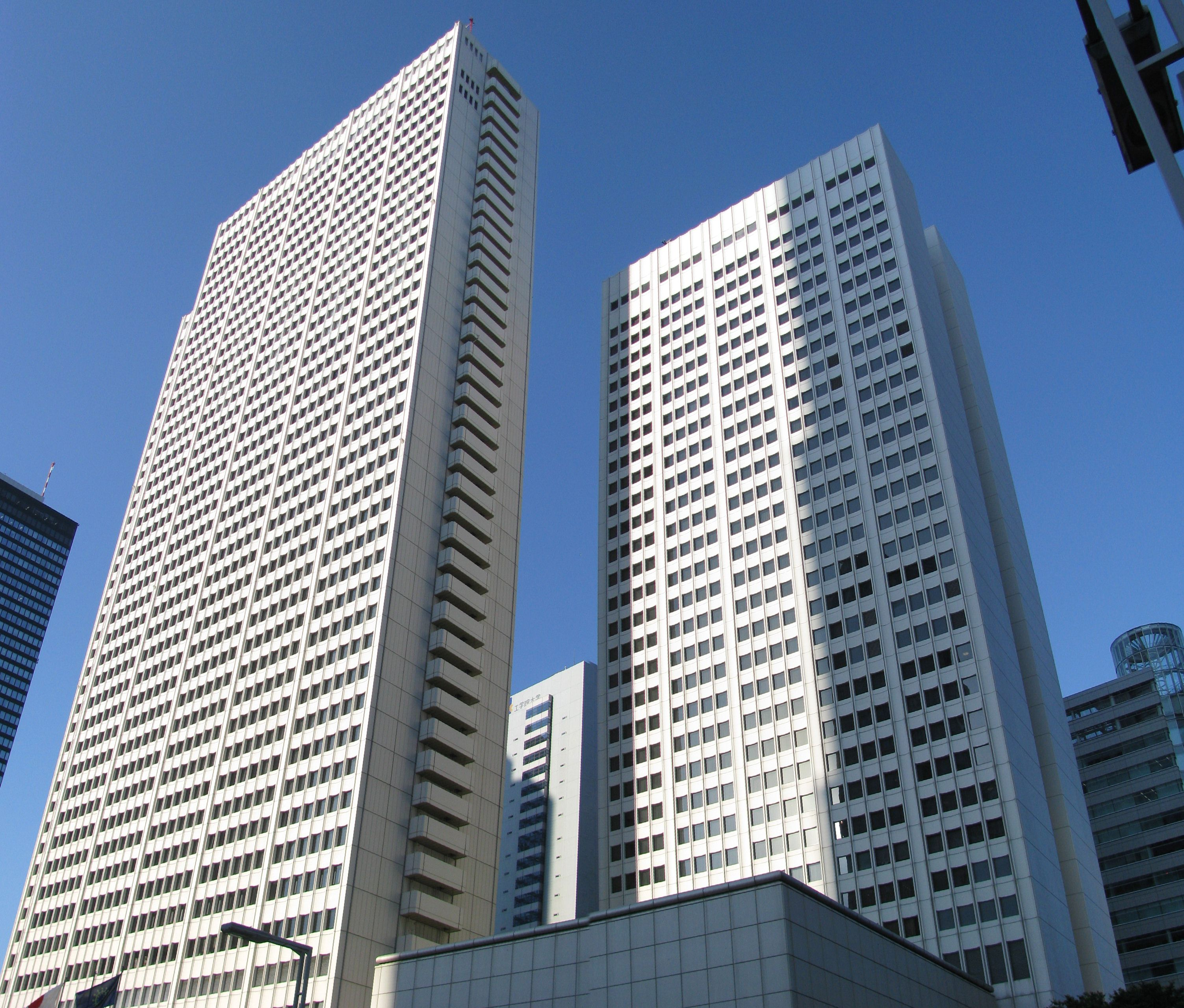

General information
- Location: 2-2-1 Nishi-Shinjuku Shinjuku, Tokyo, Japan
- Coordinates: 35°41′24″N 139°41′40″E
- Opening: 1971

Height
- Height: 584 feet (178 m)

Technical details
- Floor count: 47

Other information
- Number of rooms: 1,438

Website
- www.keioplaza.co.jp

Keio Plaza Hotel (京王プラザホテル, Keiō puraza hoteru) is a chain of hotels in Japan, the largest of which is its flagship hotel in the Nishi-Shinjuku district in Shinjuku, Tokyo, Japan. The Keio Plaza Hotel is featured in the 1984 film The Return of Godzilla and the 1991 film Godzilla vs. King Ghidorah, where it was partially destroyed.

== Locations ==
=== Tokyo ===
Keio Plaza Hotel was the first skyscraper built in Nishi-Shinjuku and the first high-rise hotel in Japan. The 1,438-room hotel is a re-development project on the site where a water purification plant (Yodobashi Purification Plant) formerly existed.

The hotel consists of two towers. The first tower is 178 metres tall and was completed in June 1971; it was the tallest building in Tokyo from 1970 until 1974, when it was surpassed by the nearby Shinjuku Sumitomo Building. The second tower is 138 metres tall and construction was finished in November 1980. In 1975 the hotel opened the first hotel chapel in Japan.

In the early 1980s, the Japanese government planned to lease a corner of the hotel's rooftop for sublease to the United States Forces Japan, officially for the purpose of relaying television transmissions between Yokota Air Base and the Hardy Barracks in central Tokyo. Japanese Communist Party lawmaker Koichiro Ueda alleged that the real purpose of the plan was to facilitate communications with US military strategic planners based in central Tokyo.

The hotel hosts the annual Miss Nippon contest. It made an appearance in the 1984 film The Return of Godzilla, where it was damaged by Godzilla.

=== Other locations ===
- Hachioji – 200 rooms, opened in 1994. Located near Hachioji Station in western Tokyo.
- Tama – 248 rooms, opened in 1990. Located near Tama-Center Station in western Tokyo.
- Sapporo – A franchised property located in Chuo-ku, Sapporo.

Keio Plaza also operated a hotel in Takamatsu from 1976 to 1997, and has an affiliate relationship with the Howard Plaza Hotel in Taipei.

== Corporate management ==
Keio Plaza Hotel Co., Ltd. was formed in 1968 as a division of the Keio Electric Railway. It operates the Keio Plaza Hotel properties in Tokyo, Hachioji and Tama, and has operating income of around 28.4 billion yen.

Keio Plaza was branded as part of InterContinental Hotels from 1972 to 2003, and subsequently joined the Summit Hotels & Resorts group.

Records
Preceded by World Trade Center Building	Tallest building in Japan; 180 m (589 ft); 1971–1974	Succeeded by Shinjuku Sumitomo Building
Preceded by World Trade Center Building	Tallest building in Tokyo; 180 m (589 ft); 1971–1974	Succeeded by Shinjuku Sumitomo Building
