= Sunshine 60 =

Skyscraper in Tokyo, Japan

- サンシャイン60
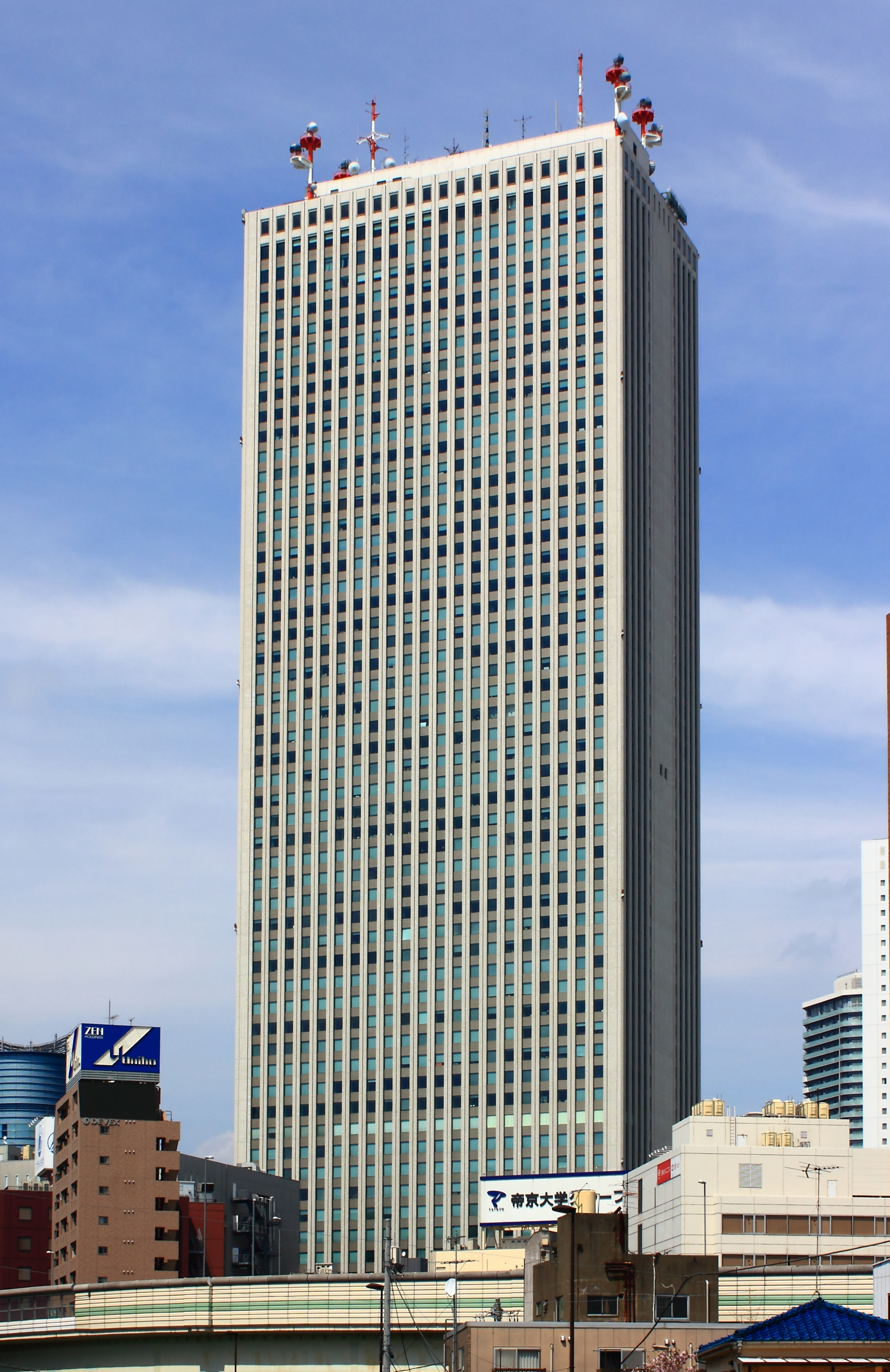
- Interactive map of the Sunshine 60 area

Record height
- Tallest in Japan from 1978 to 1991^{[I]}
- Preceded by: Shinjuku Mitsui Building
- Surpassed by: Tokyo Metropolitan Government Building

General information
- Type: Mixed-use
- Location: 3-1-1 Higashi-Ikebukuro; Toshima, Tokyo, Japan
- Coordinates: 35°43′46.5″N 139°43′4″E
- Construction started: July 1973
- Completed: 1978
- Opening: March 1978
- Owner: Mitsubishi Estate Co.

Height
- Roof: 239.7 m (786 ft)

Technical details
- Floor count: 60 above ground 4 below ground
- Floor area: 241,546 m^{2} (2,599,980 sq ft)
- Lifts/elevators: 41 (33 by Toshiba Elevator, 8 by Mitsubishi Electric)

Design and construction
- Architect: Mitsubishi Estate Co.
- Developer: Mitsubishi Estate Co.
- Main contractor: Joint-venture led by Taisei Construction

Sunshine 60 (サンシャイン60, Sanshain rokujū) is a 60-story, mixed-use skyscraper located in Ikebukuro, Toshima, Tokyo, adjoining the Sunshine City complex. At the time of its completion in 1978, the 239.7 m (787 ft) building was the tallest in Asia, a title it held until 1985 when it was surpassed by the 63 Building in Seoul. Sunshine 60 was also the tallest building in Tokyo and Japan until the Tokyo Metropolitan Government Building was completed in 1991, and housed the world's fastest elevators (at 600 metres per minute (2,000 ft/min)) until the opening of the Yokohama Landmark Tower in 1993; Mitsubishi Electric installed the elevators at the former's highest-rise bank as well as the latter, and Mitsubishi Estate owns both buildings.

== Construction ==
Sunshine 60's foundation is made of reinforced concrete. The lower segment of the building is also reinforced concrete with a steel skeleton. The upper tower is a steel skeleton with "slitted shear walls". These unique walls were inserted between columns in the core, allowing the walls to conform to deformations in the steel frame caused by earthquakes and wind shear helping to assure structural integrity. A rigid framing structural system creates the frame. Mechanical equipment is located directly above the core of the structure on its rooftop.

Sunshine 60 was erected over the site of the destroyed Sugamo Prison, famously used to hold senior Japanese war criminals during the occupation. On December 23, 1948, seven high-ranking, convicted war criminals (including former Prime Minister Hideki Tojo and former civilian Prime Minister Kōki Hirota) were hanged at the prison. It was also the site of the hanging of Soviet spy Richard Sorge during the war. In popular modern lore, the area is rumored to be haunted.

== Facilities ==
As a mixed-use high-rise, Sunshine 60's space is used for a variety of purposes. Floors 1 through 9 are used as commercial space and house a post office, banks, showrooms, cafeterias, a health care center and a day care center. Office space occupies floors 10 through 57. Restaurants are located on the 58th and 59th floors.

From the 60th floor, visitors can see as far as 100 km on a clear day from Sunshine 60's observation deck (admission fee up to ¥620). To get visitors to the observation deck quickly, the observation deck bank of the tower's 40 elevators takes passengers directly from the lobby at a speed of 600 meters per minute (36 km/h, 22 mph). Between its opening and 1993 (the opening of Yokohama Landmark Tower), the observation deck elevators were the fastest in the world.

=== Office tenants ===
The office floors house the headquarters of Credit Saison, FamilyMart, NTT Plala and Sammy Corporation, among other office tenants.

== Image gallery ==
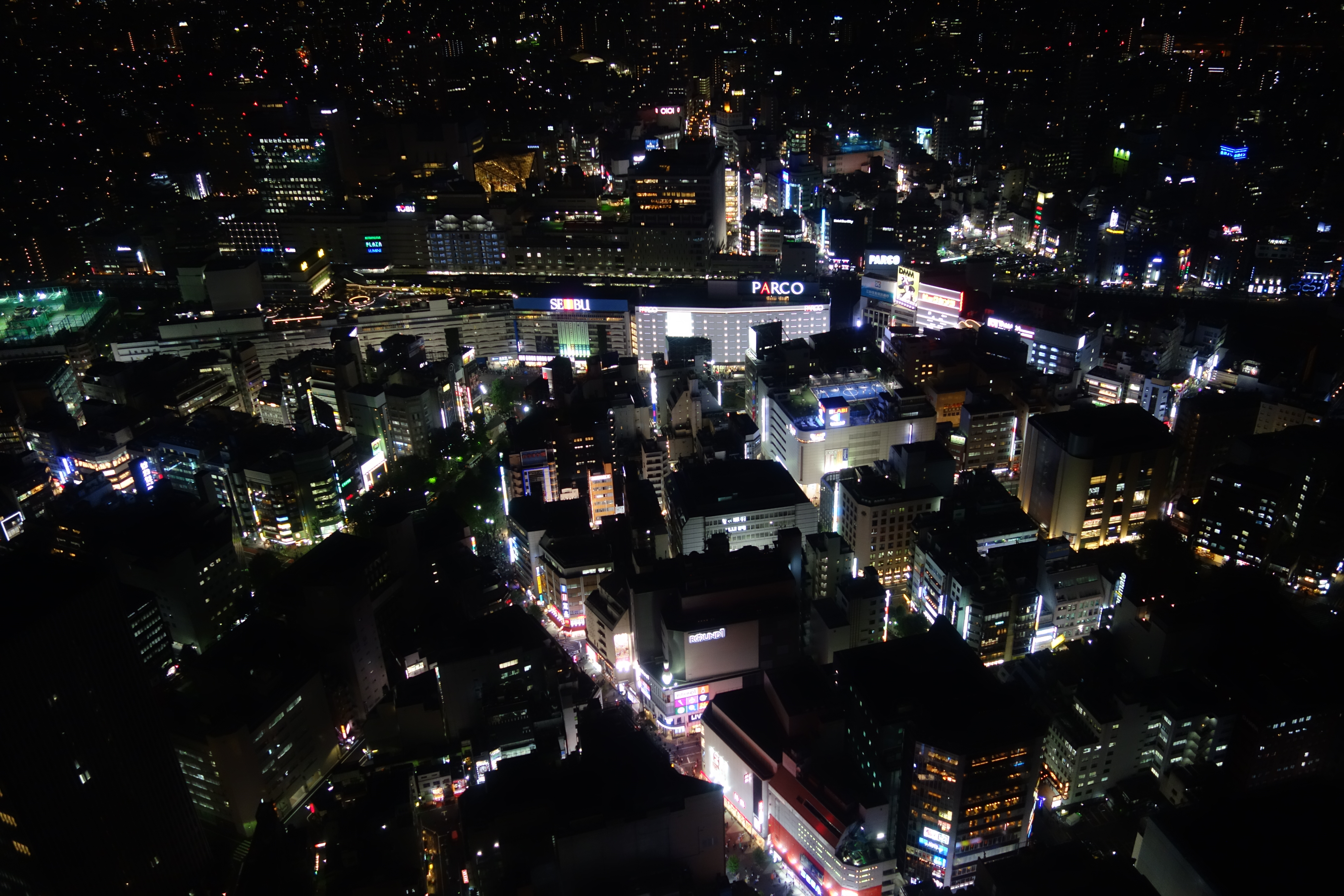
Night view of Ikebukuro from Sunshine 60

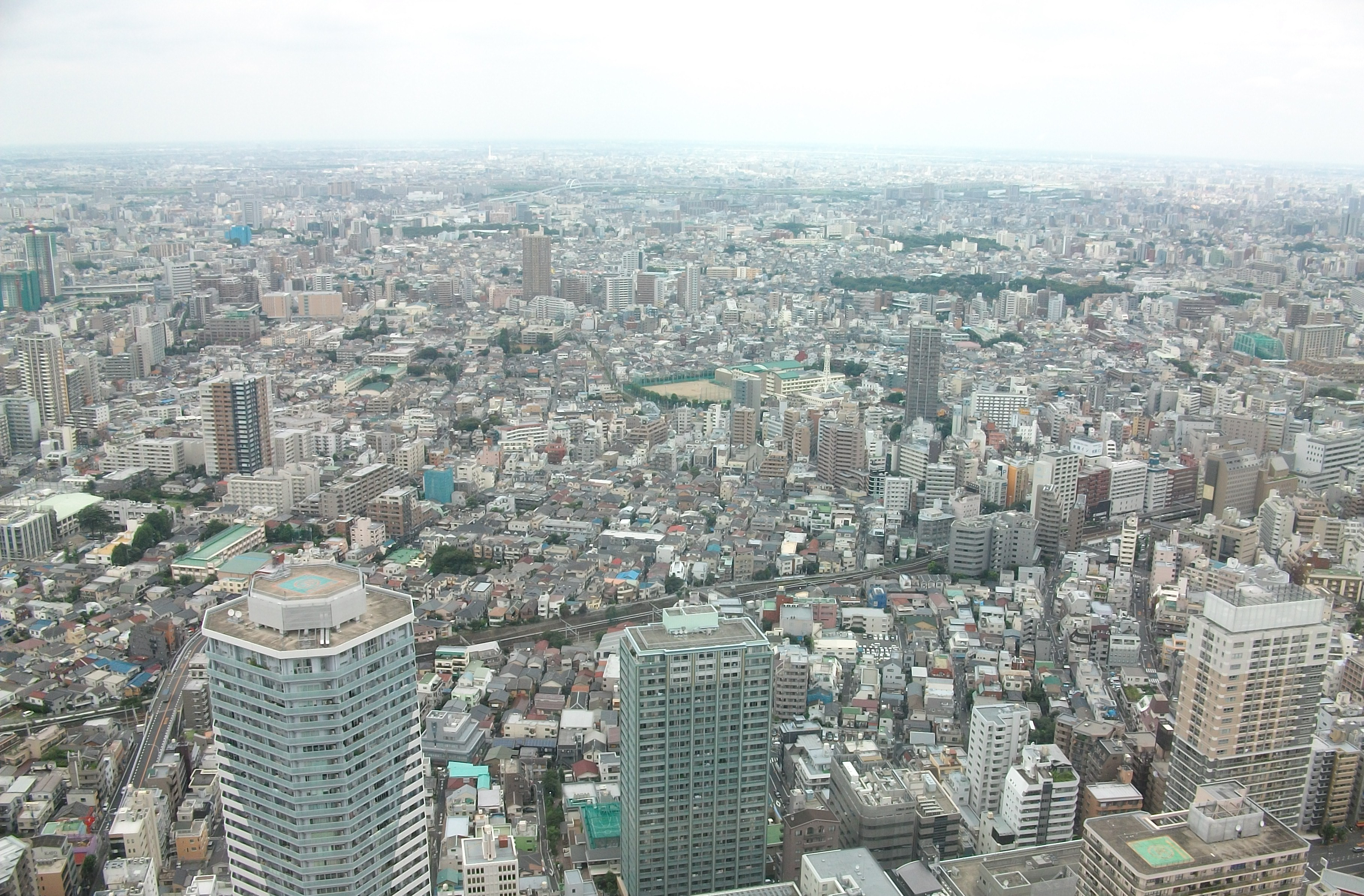
Views from Sunshine 60 observatory

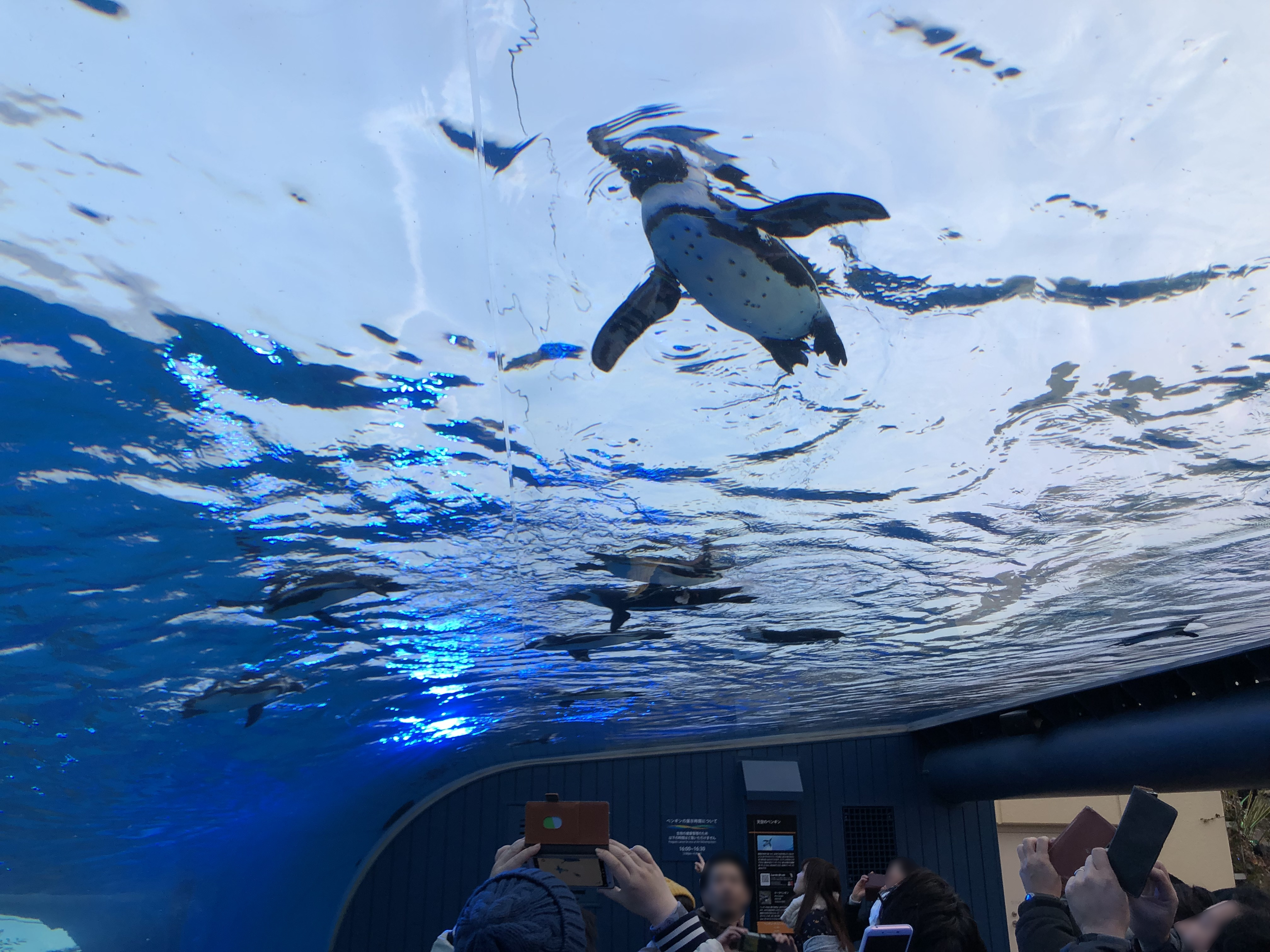
Sunshine Aquarium

== See also ==
- Sunshine City
- Ancient Orient Museum

Records
Preceded by Shinjuku Mitsui Building	Tallest building in Japan; 240 m (786 ft); 1978–1990	Succeeded by Tokyo Metropolitan Government Building No. 1
Preceded by Shinjuku Mitsui Building	Tallest building in Tokyo; 240 m (786 ft); 1978–1990	Succeeded by Tokyo Metropolitan Government Building No. 1
