= JP Tower =

Skyscraper in Japan

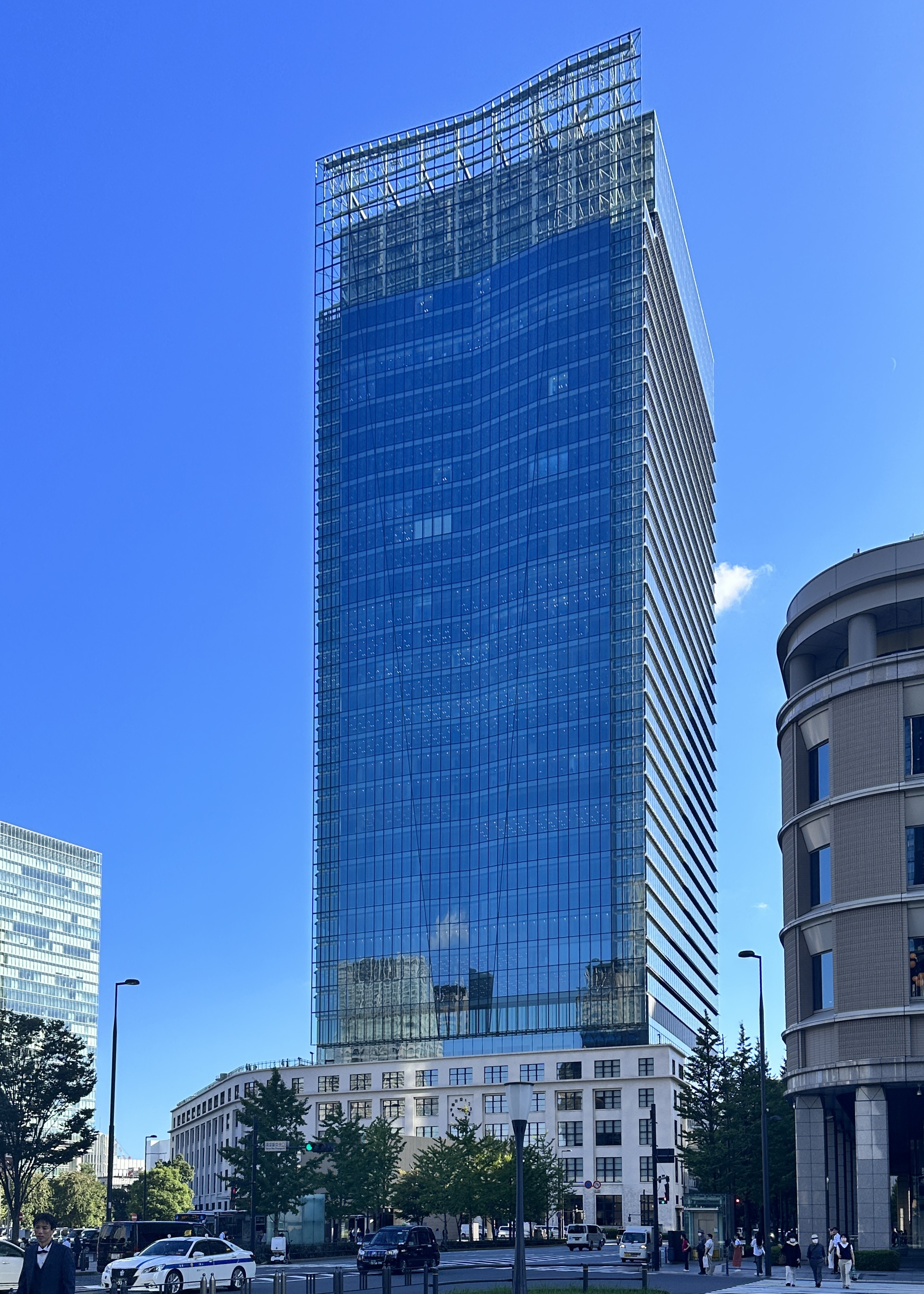
- JP Tower, Marunouchi
- Interactive map of the JP Tower area

General information
- Status: Completed
- Type: Offices, post office, retail, dining
- Location: Chiyoda, Tokyo, Japan
- Coordinates: 35.679583°N 139.764722°E
- Construction started: November 2009
- Completed: May 2012
- Opening: March 21, 2013
- Owner: Japan Post

Height
- Roof: 200.0 m (656.2 ft)
- Top floor: 38

Technical details
- Floor count: 42 (38 above ground, 4 underground)
- Floor area: 212,000 m^{2} (2,280,000 sq ft)
- Lifts/elevators: 34 (32 passenger, 2 service)

Design and construction
- Architects: Tetsuro Yoshida (1931), Helmut Jahn (38 floor tower)
- Developer: Japan Post
- Structural engineer: Mitsubishi Jisho Sekkei Inc.
- Main contractor: Taisei Corporation

The JP Tower (Japanese: JPタワー) is a 195.7 m (642 ft) building with integrated retail and restaurant facilities located in front of the Marunouchi Exit of Tokyo Station in Chiyoda ward, Tokyo. The building was completed in May 2012 and was opened to the public on March 21, 2013.

== Overview ==
The 38 story JP Tower replaces the former central mail sorting facility of Japan Post. A large portion of the original five story low rise frontage of the Tokyo Central Post Office, designed in 1931 by Tetsuro Yoshida, was preserved and redeveloped as the Kitte retail and dining facility. JP Tower tenants include offices of the Mitsubishi UFJ Financial Group.

The basement floor connects directly to Tokyo Station, as well as other nearby buildings.

== Intermediatheque ==
The Intermediatheque, located in the renovated Central Post Office building on the 2nd and 3rd floor, serves as a museum of academic culture and a venue for workshops and seminars open to the general public.

The Intermediatheque was launched as an academic-industry collaborative project with the support of the University of Tokyo. The facility is jointly operated by Japan Post and The University Museum, The University of Tokyo. Many of the furnishings and exhibits on display dating back to the Imperial University era.
