= Taisei Corporation =

Japanese construction and retail estate company

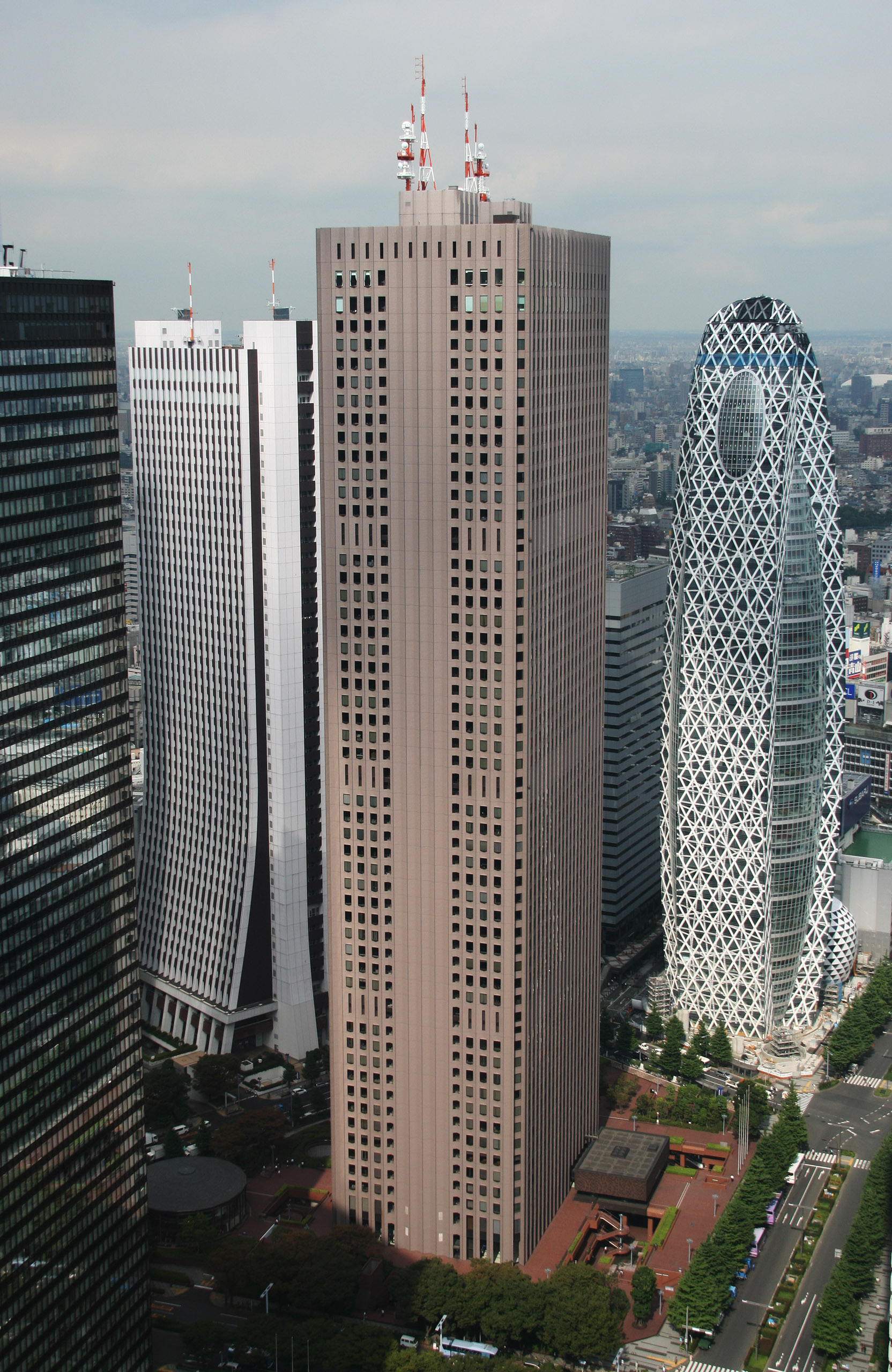
- Headquarters in the Shinjuku Center Building
- Native name: 大成建設株式会社
- Romanized name: Taisei Kensetsu kabushiki gaisha
- Type: Public KK
- Traded as: TYO: 1801; NAG: 1801; Nikkei 225 component (TYO)
- Industry: Construction
- Founded: Tokyo, Japan (October 1, 1873)
- Founder: Okura Kihachiro
- Headquarters: Shinjuku Center Building, Shinjuku, Tokyo, Japan
- Area served: Worldwide
- Key people: Yamauchi Takashi (Chairman, Representative Director); Yoshiyuki Murata (President and Chief Executive Officer, Representative Director)
- Products: Building Construction; Civil Engineering; Real Estate Development
- Brands: Palcon (パルコン)
- Revenue: ¥1,487,253 million (2017)
- Operating income: ¥140,823 million (2017)
- Net income: ¥90,566 million (2017)
- Total assets: ¥570,814 million (2017)
- Number of employees: 13,977 (2017)
- Website: www.taisei.co.jp

Taisei Corporation (大成建設株式会社, Taisei Kensetsu kabushiki gaisha; formerly known in English as the Taisei Construction Company, Ltd.) is a Japanese corporation founded in 1873. Its main areas of business are building construction, civil engineering, and real estate development. Taisei's headquarters are located at Shinjuku Center Building in Nishi-Shinjuku, Shinjuku, Tokyo.

Taisei has 15 branch offices, 1 technology center, 46 domestic offices, 12 overseas offices, 29 consolidated subsidiaries and 43 affiliated companies accounted for by the equity-method.

== Overview ==
Taisei Corporation is one of the five so called Japanese "super general contractors" (スーパーゼネコン, suupaa zenekon), the other four being Kajima Corporation, Shimizu Corporation, Takenaka Corporation and Obayashi Corporation. Taisei Corporation has its roots in Okura zaibatsu (財閥) established by Baron Ōkura Kihachirō (大倉 喜八郎). Following the dissolution of the zaibatsu after World War II, Taisei was restructured as an employee-owned corporation and is currently the only employee-owned Japanese large scale general contractor among the "super general contractors"; the other four are owned and controlled by families.

Taisei has successfully constructed several civil and building projects including skyscrapers, dams, bridges, tunnels, subways as well as residential housing projects both in Japan and overseas. Taisei is also well known in Japan for its disaster resistant housing brand Palcon (パルコン).

Noted international projects where Taisei was involved include the expansion of the Palm Islands undersea tunnel in Dubai, the Bosphorus undersea tunnel in Turkey, the New Doha International Airport in Qatar, the Noi Bai International Airport Terminal 2 in Hanoi, the Mega Bridge in Thailand, the Cần Thơ Bridge in Vietnam and the Iloilo International Airport in Iloilo City, Philippines.

== History ==
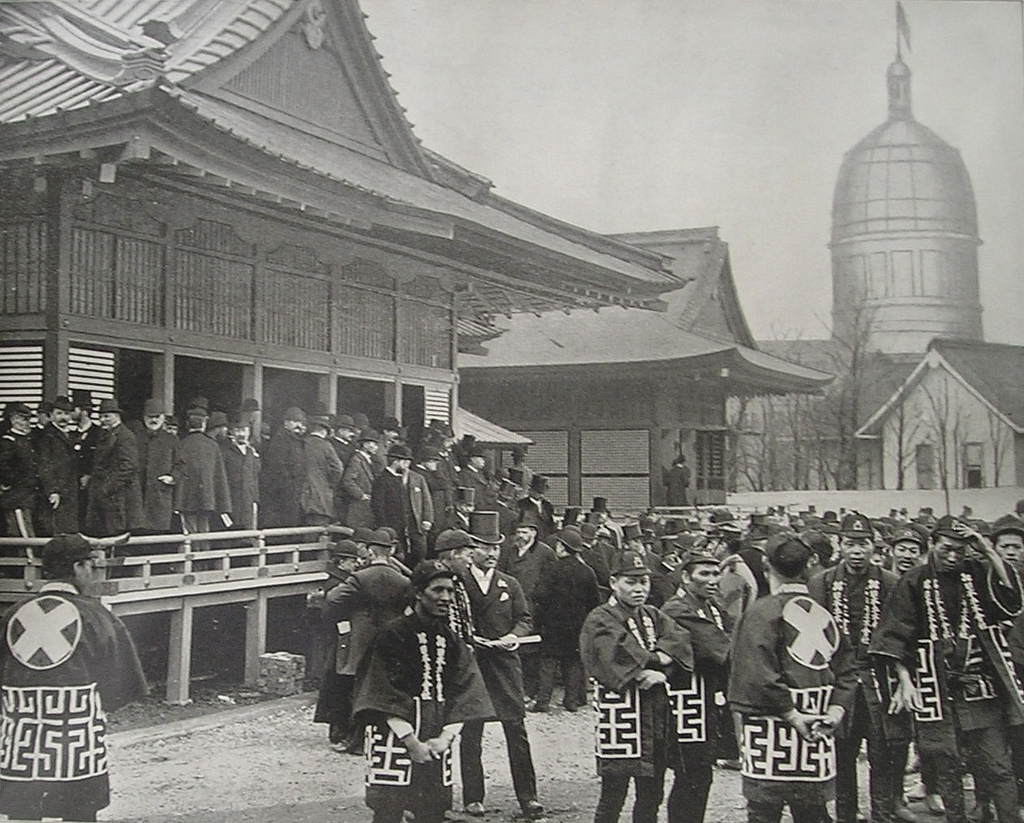
Nippon Doboku Co., Ltd staff at the dedication of Ho-o-den May 1893

Taisei was founded in 1873 as Okuragumi Shokai Company (大倉組商会, Ōkuragumi Shōkai). It became Nippon Doboku Co., Ltd. (有限責任日本土木会社, Yūgen Sekinin Nippon Doboku Kaisha) in 1887, and was renamed Taisei Corporation in 1946.

- 1873 October - Okura Kihachiro founded Okuragumi Shokai.
- 1887 March - Nippon Doboku Co., Ltd. was established as a limited liability company.
- 1892 November - Dissolution of Nippon Doboku Co., Ltd and establishment of Okura Doboku Gumi (大倉土木組).
- 1911 November - Renamed to Kabushiki Gaisha Okura Gumi (株式会社大倉組).
- 1920 - Renamed to Nippon Doboku Kabushiki Gaisha (日本土木株式会社).
- 1924 - Renamed to Okura Doboku Kabushiki Gaisha (大倉土木株式会社).
- 1946 January - Renamed to Taisei Corporation.

== Achievements ==
The following are some notable achievements of Taisei since its establishment in 1873.

- 1882 - Ginza Arc Lights: The first electrical street lighting in Japan was installed on Ginza Dori shopping street in Tokyo
- 1882 - Rokumeikan, a beautiful western-style building was constructed
- 1890 - Lake Biwa Lock and Tunnel: A modern development project in Kyoto to use the water of Lake Biwa in a canal and for power generation
- 1923 - New Imperial Hotel: The first real Western style hotel in Japan, designed by Frank Lloyd Wright, was constructed.
- 1927 - Tokyo's Ginza Subway Line, Japan's first subway connecting Ueno to Asakusa was constructed.
- 1955 - The terminal building at Tokyo International Airport (Haneda) was constructed
- 1958 - National Stadium, the first major athletic stadium in Japan was constructed for the third Asian Games. After modification in 1963, it was used as the main stadium of the Tokyo Olympics
- 1964 - Hotel New Otani, Japan's first skyscraper constructed in time to accommodate visitors to the 1964 Tokyo Olympics.
- 1965 - Mt. Fuji Weather Station, one of Japan's main meteorological observing stations. It was constructed under harsh weather conditions at the highest altitude in Japan.
- 1968 - Completion of the new Imperial Palace.
- 1988 - Seikan Tunnel is Japan's longest railway tunnel connecting Hakodate to Aomori by land. It took over 20 years to complete.
- 1989 - Completion of the Yokohama Bay Bridge.
- 1991 - Tokyo Metropolitan Government Main Building No. 1, a symbolic building towering over the new city center of Tokyo.
- 1994 - Kannongawa River water-conveyance conduit (Original client: Kawasaki City, Client: Japan Sewage Works Agency), for which the spherical shield production process (horn industrial method) was adopted for the first time in the world.
- 2001 - Sapporo Dome is a large dome constructed for the 2002 World Cup. With its hovering sliding pitch stage, the dome can host indoor football and baseball games.
- 2009 - Djibouti Kempinski Hotel, a high-class five-star hotel was designed and constructed in just nine months.
- 2010 - Tokyo International Airport (Haneda) Runway D adopted the world's first hybrid structure that combines a reclaimed land portion with a jetty portion.
- 2012 - JP Tower is a seismic isolated building that preserves part of the old Tokyo Station Central Post Office on a block that faces Tokyo Station Plaza
- 2013 - Opening of the Bosphorus undersea tunnel, Istanbul, Turkey. The undersea tunnel was constructed by the immersed tunnel method to form the world's deepest immersed tunnel, in one of the most rapid ocean currents in the world.
- 2014 - Completed construction of the Noi Bai International Airport Terminal, Hanoi, Vietnam
- 2016 - Sumitomo Fudosan Roppongi Grand Tower. Completed a high-rise building of about 230 meters tall, housing three functions of commercial office space, residential space, and retail space, in an extensive area of about 27,000 square meters that is adjacent to Roppongi-itchome Station on the Tokyo Metro Namboku Line.
- 2023 - Taisei Corporation, Nippon Steel Corporation, Taiheiyo Cement Corporation, Mitsubishi Heavy Industries (MHI), ITOCHU Oil Exploration Co., INPEX Corporation and ITOCHU join forces for a feasibility study of the Advanced CCS project, part of the Tohoku West Coast CCS initiative. Such projects are a means of decarbonisation and are expected to lead the Japanese government to carbon neutrality and a 46% reduction in greenhouse gas emissions (from FY 2013 levels). The Corporation is participating in the carbon capture and storage project in Japan. In May 2023, the company tested the feasibility and energy efficiency of second-life solar panels in new office buildings at Fukoka Airport.

== Domestic Operations ==
=== Headquarters ===
Taisei's headquarters is located in Shinjuku Center Building, Nishi-Shinjuku, Shinjuku, Tokyo. Taisei has 15 branch offices, 1 technology center, 46 domestic offices and 6 major domestic subsidiaries.

=== Domestic Offices ===
- Kyushu: Fukuoka
- Chugoku: Hiroshima
- Shikoku: Takamatsu
- Kansai: Osaka
- Kobe
- Kyoto
- Nagoya
- Yokohama
- Chiba
- Kanto: Saitama
- Tokyo
- Hokushinetsu: Niigata
- Tohoku: Sendai
- Sapporo

=== Domestic Subsidiaries ===
- Taisei ROTEC Corporation
- Taisei-Yuraku Real Estate Co., Ltd.
- Taisei U-LEC Co., Ltd.
- Taisei Setsubi Co., Ltd.
- Taisei Housing Corporation
- Seiwa Renewal Works Co., Ltd.

== International Operations ==
=== Headquarters ===
Taisei's international operations headquarters is located in Shinjuku Center Building, Nishi-Shinjuku, Shinjuku, Tokyo.

=== Overseas Offices ===
==== Taiwan ====
- Taipei

==== Qatar ====
- Doha

==== Malaysia ====
- Kuala Lumpur

==== Indonesia ====
- Jakarta

==== India ====
- Delhi

==== Pakistan ====
- Islamabad

==== Vietnam ====
- Hanoi
- Ho Chi Minh City

==== Thailand ====
- Bangkok

==== Philippines ====
- Manila

==== Myanmar ====
- Yangon

==== Sri Lanka ====
- Colombo

==== Egypt ====
- Cairo

==== Turkey ====
- Istanbul

=== Subsidiaries and Affiliates ===
==== Indonesia ====
- PT. Taisei Pulauintan Construction International
- PT. Indotaisei Indah Development

==== Thailand ====
- Taisei (Thailand) Co., Ltd.

==== Vietnam ====
- Vinata International Co., Ltd.

==== China ====
- CSCEC-Taisei Construction, Ltd.

==== Philippines ====
- Taisei Philippine Construction, Inc.

==== Myanmar ====
- Taisei Myanmar Co., Ltd.

== Photos ==
Iloilo International Airport, Iloilo City, Philippines completed jointly by Taisei Corporation and Shimizu Corporation in 2007.

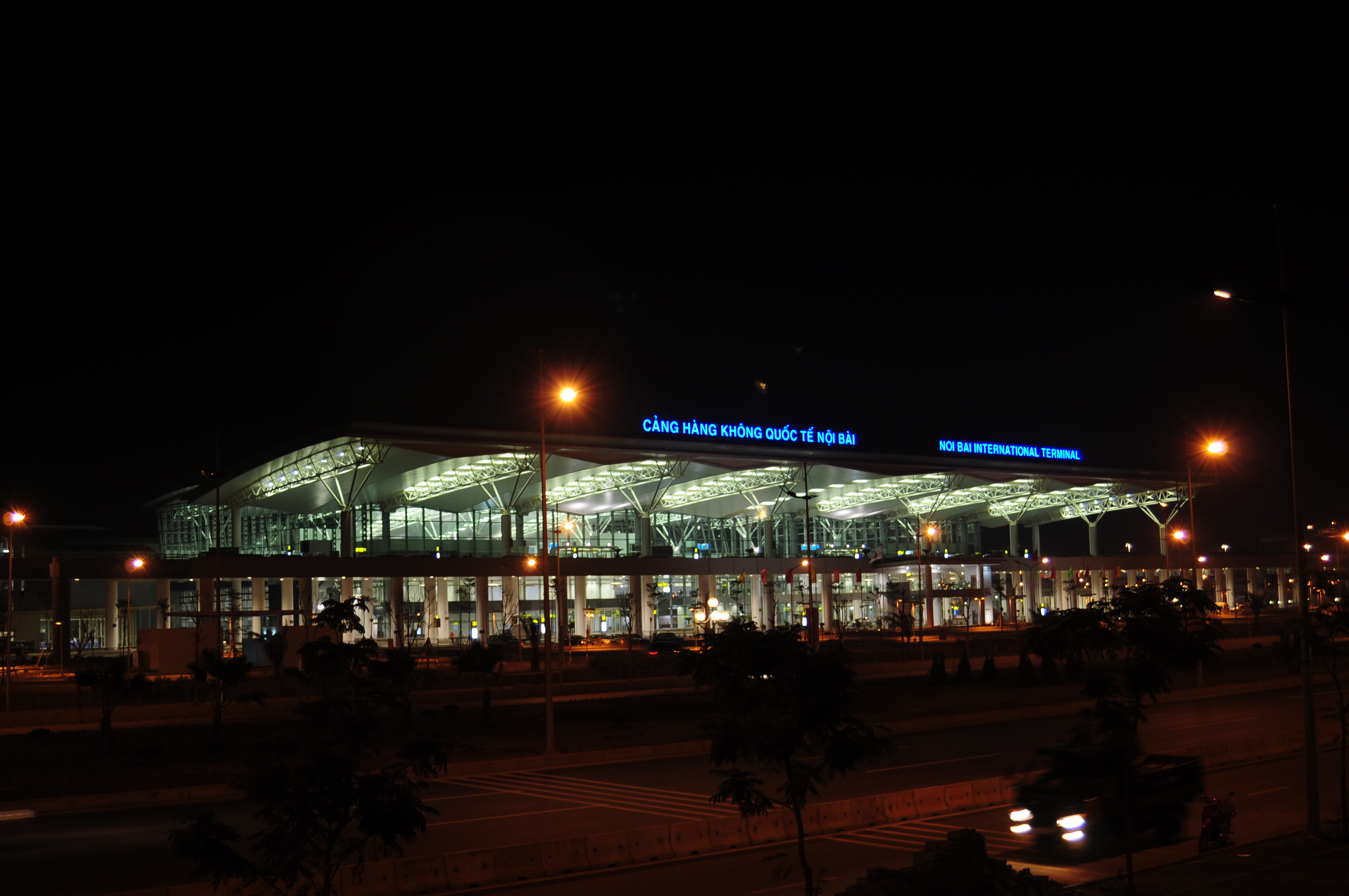
Night view of the Noi Bai International Airport Terminal 2.

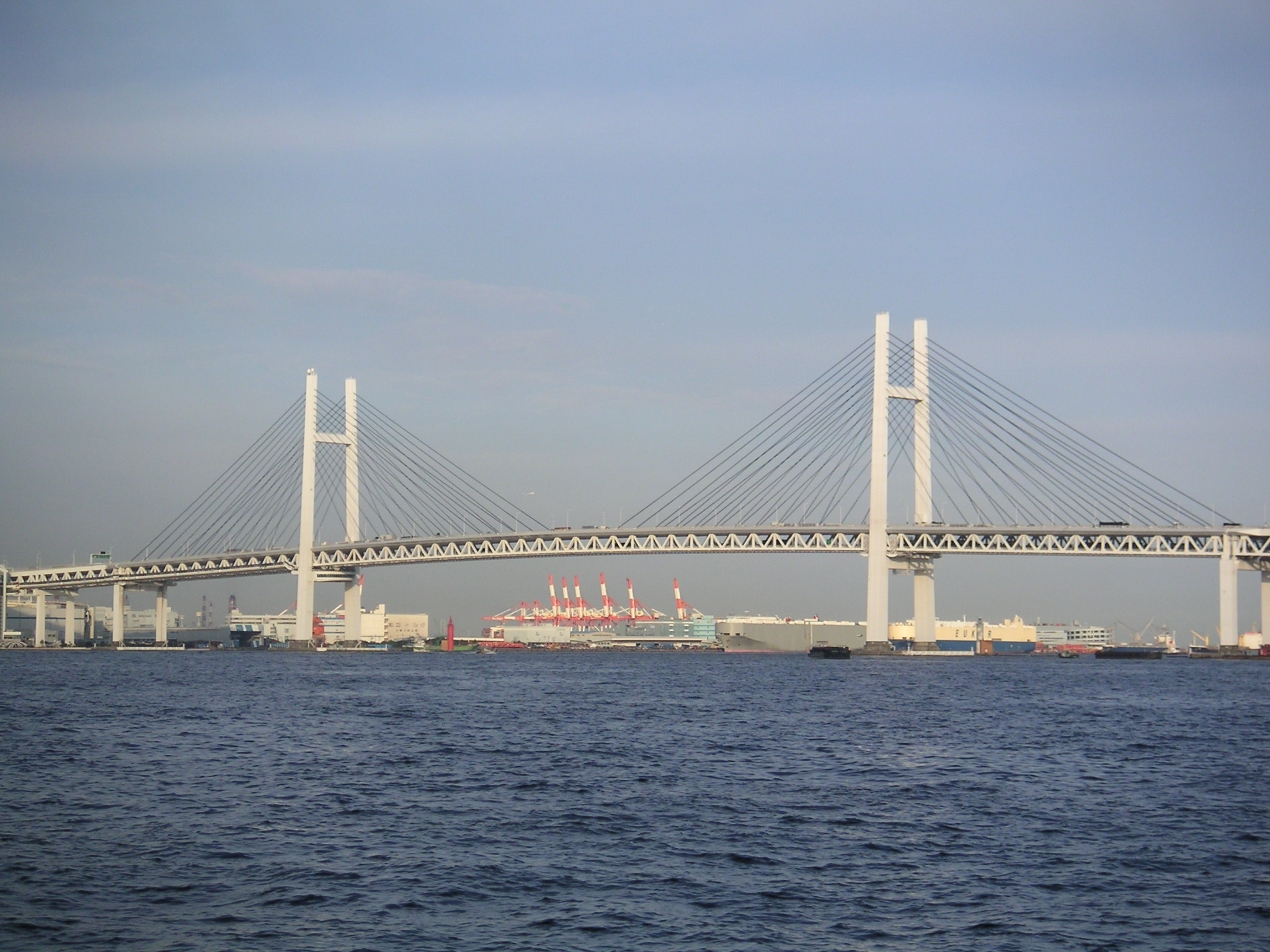
Yokohama Bay Bridge

The JP Tower building in front of Tokyo Station.

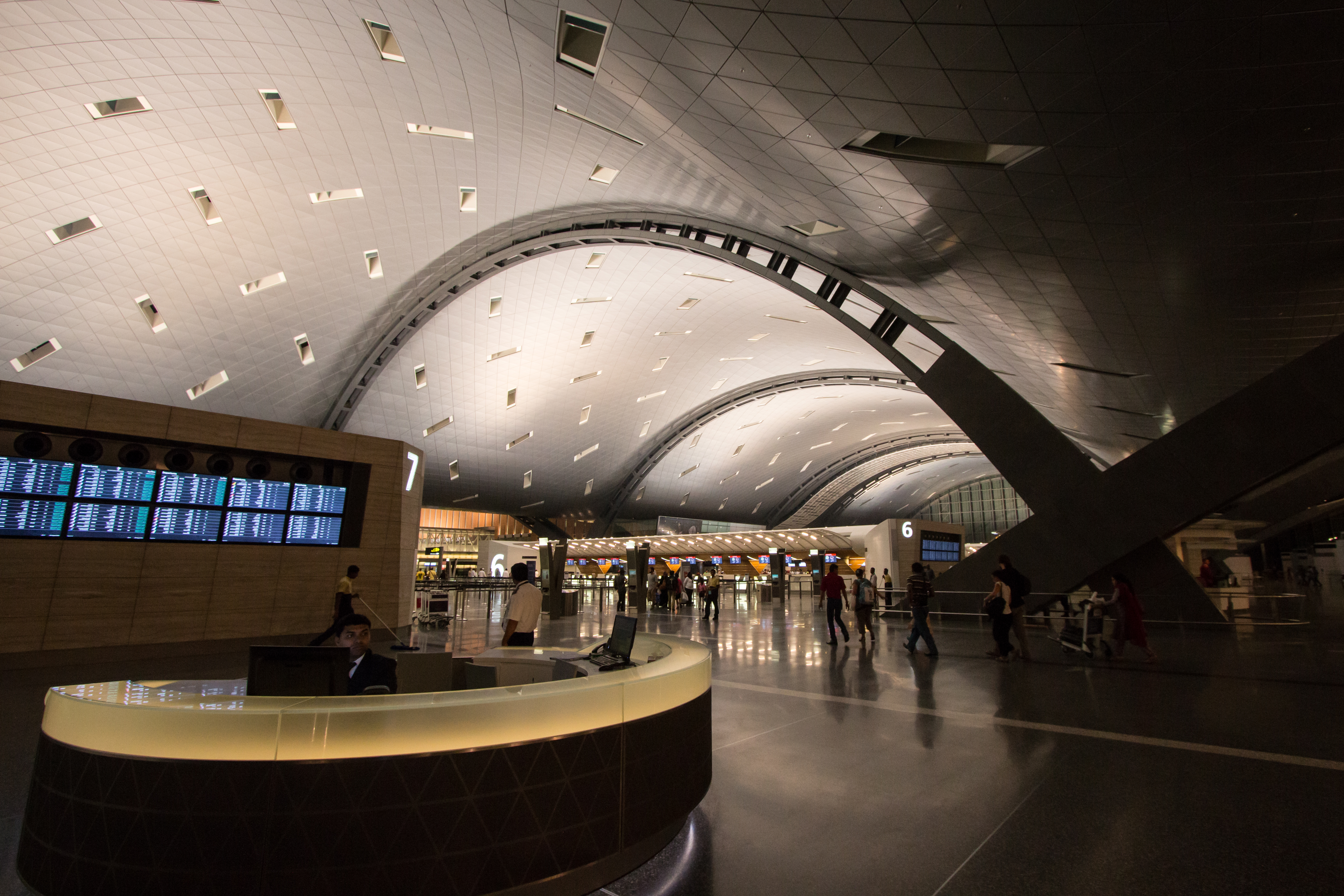
The New Doha International Airport in Qatar
