= Japan National Stadium =

Multi-purpose stadium in Tokyo

- 国立競技場
- MUFG Stadium

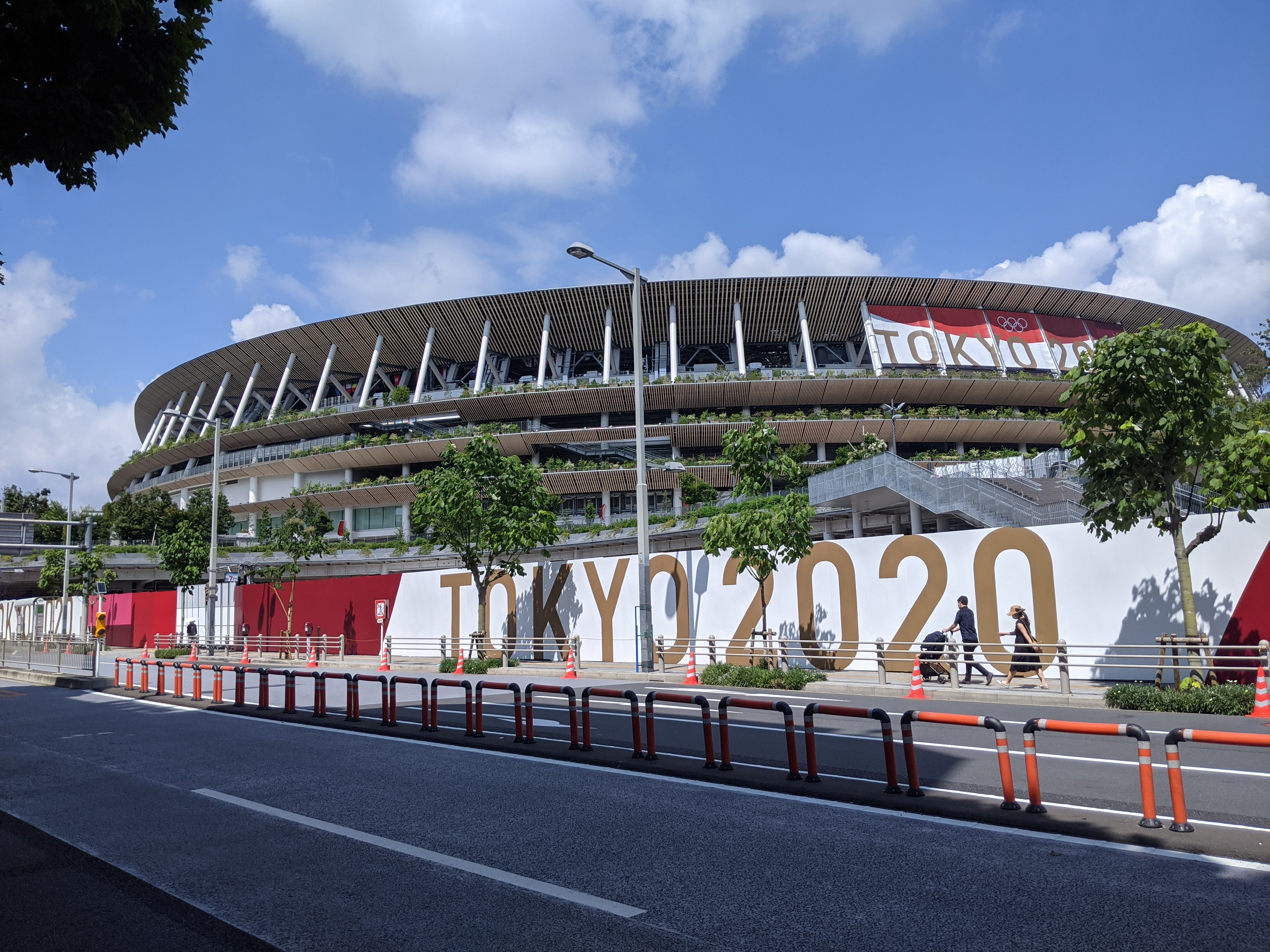
- Japan National Stadium during Tokyo 2020 Olympic Games
- Interactive map of Japan National Stadium
- Location: 10-2, Kasumigaoka-machi, Shinjuku, Tokyo, Japan
- Coordinates: 35°40′42″N 139°42′53″E
- Owner: Japan Sport Council
- Operator: Japan National Stadium Entertainment
- Capacity: 67,750
- Surface: Grass
- Field size: 107 × 71 m
- Public transit: Kokuritsu-Kyōgijō (Toei Ōedo Line); Sendagaya (JR Chūō–Sōbu Line)

Construction
- Groundbreaking: 11 December 2016; 9 years ago
- Built: December 2016 – 30 November 2019
- Opened: 21 December 2019; 6 years ago
- Cost: US$1.4 billion (¥157 billion)
- Architect: Kengo Kuma

Tenants
- Japan national football team Japan national rugby union team All Japan High School Soccer Final

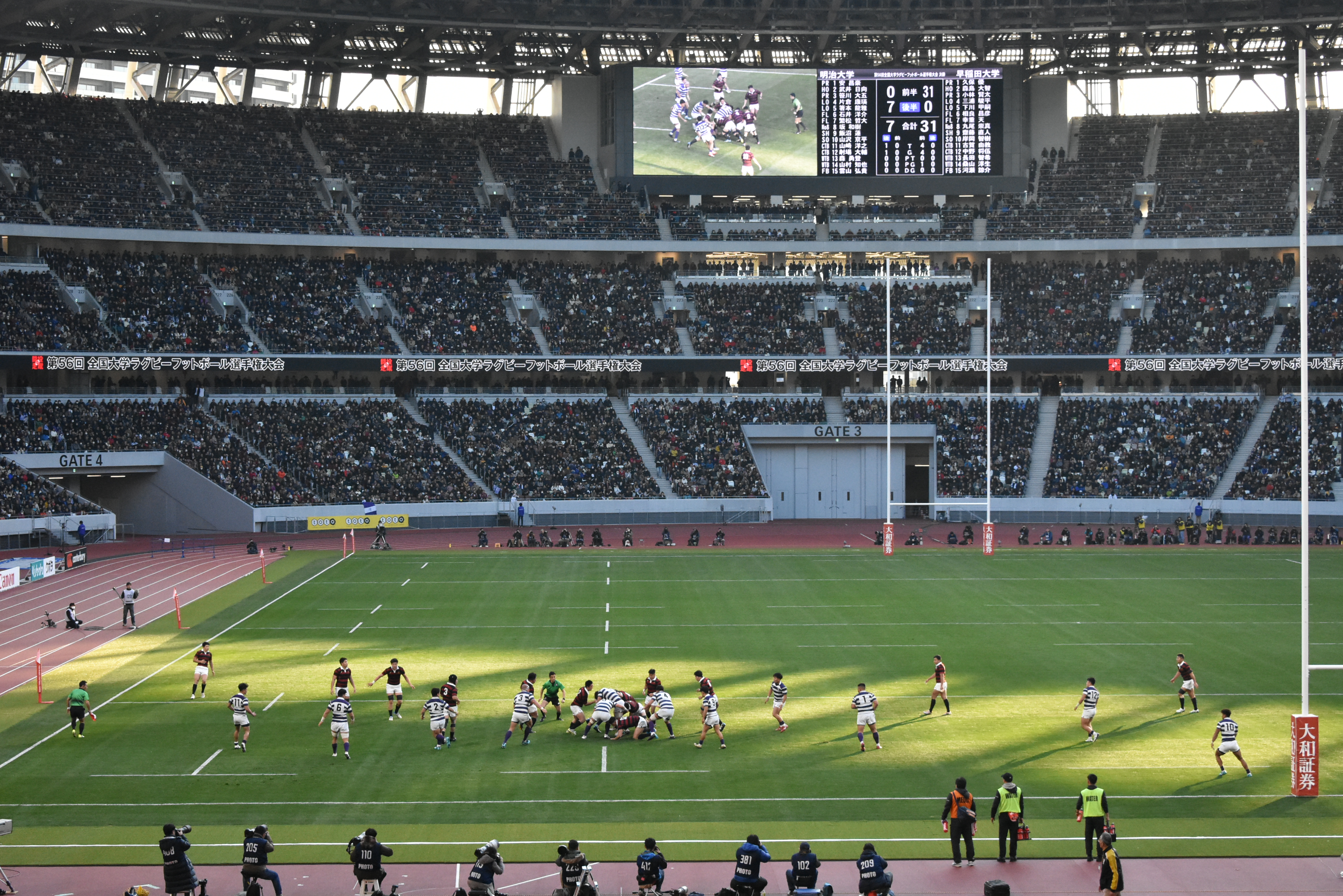
The rugby game Classic Meiji University versus Waseda University at 56th All-Japan University Rugby Championship - final

Outside and inside the stadium, 2022

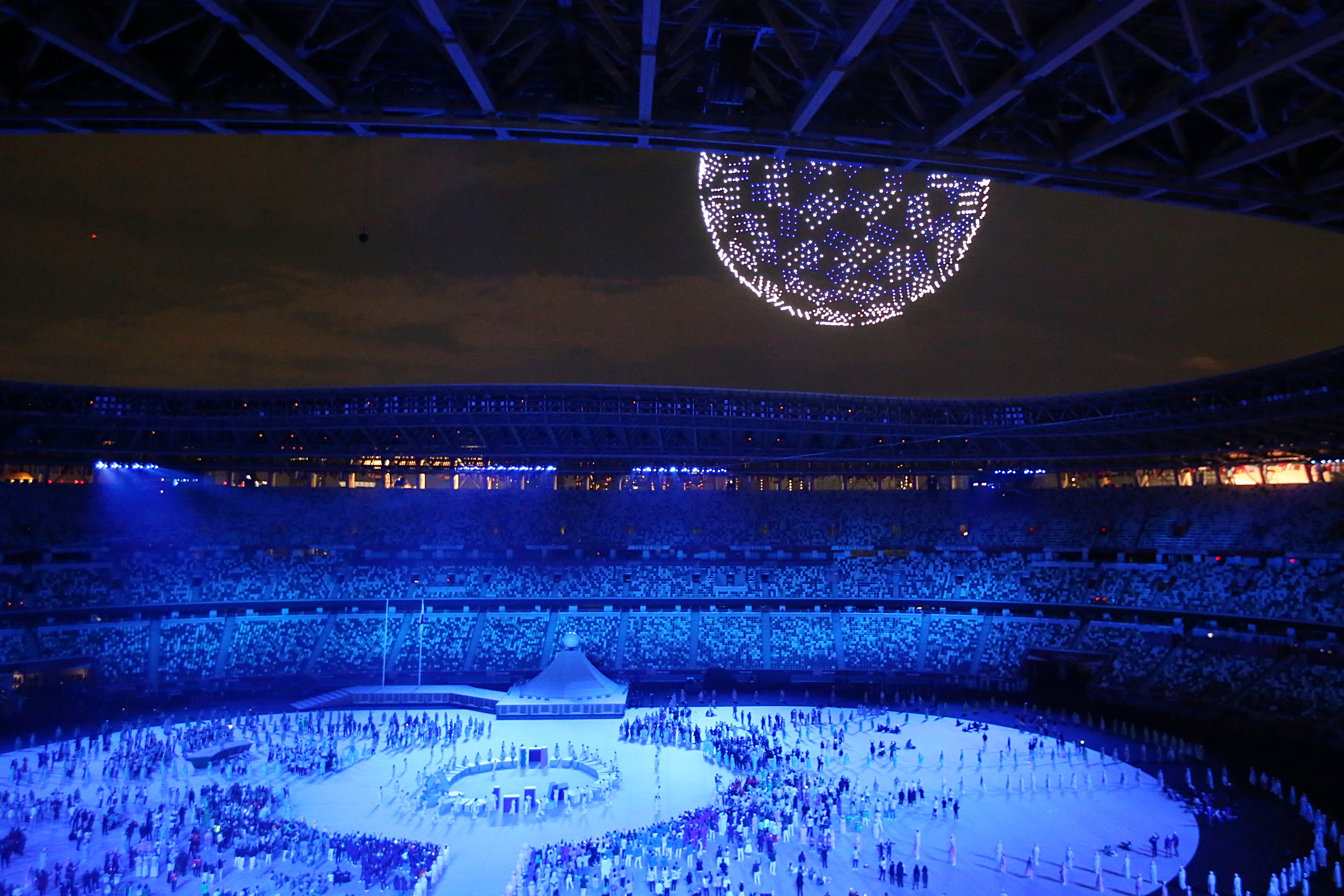
A scene from the 2020 Summer Olympics opening ceremony at the Olympic Stadium, with drones flying around and creating the official logo of the Games

The National Stadium (国立競技場, Kokuritsu Kyōgijō), alternatively Olympic Stadium (オリンピックスタジアム, Orinpikku Sutajiamu; during 2020 Summer Olympics and Paralympics), currently known as MUFG Stadium (MUFGスタジアム, MUFG Sutajiamu) for sponsorship reasons, and formerly known as New National Stadium (新国立競技場, Shin Kokuritsu Kyōgijō), is a multipurpose stadium in Tokyo, Japan. Opened in 2019 and originally constructed for the 2020 Summer Olympics and Paralympics, it hosted the ceremonies and track and field events. Since the Games, the stadium has primarily been used for association football and rugby union events.

The construction of a new National Stadium for Tokyo 2020 was first announced in February 2012; the new stadium was originally set to use a design by British architect Zaha Hadid, which featured an arch-based appearance and a retractable roof. Following criticism of its design and expected costs, the Japanese government scrapped the original plans and began soliciting new bids. In December 2015, the Japan Sport Council accepted a bid by Taisei Corporation and Japanese architect Kengo Kuma. Construction would begin in December 2016.

== History ==
After Tokyo submitted their bid for the 2020 Summer Olympics, there was talk of possibly renovating or reconstructing the National Olympic Stadium. The stadium would host the opening and closing ceremonies as well as track and field events.

In February 2012, it was confirmed that the stadium would be demolished and reconstructed, and receive a £1 billion upgrade. In November 2012, renderings of the new national stadium were revealed, based on a design by British architect Zaha Hadid (who had designed the London Aquatics Centre for the 2012 Summer Olympics). The stadium was demolished in 2015 and the new one was originally scheduled to be completed in March 2019. The new stadium was to be the venue for athletics, rugby, some football games, and the opening and closing ceremonies of the Olympics and Paralympics.

The Japanese government announced several changes to Hadid's design in May 2015, citing budget constraints, including cancelling plans to build a retractable roof and converting some permanent seating to temporary seating. The site area was also reduced from 71 acres (290,000 m^{2}) to 52 acres (210,000 m^{2}). Several prominent Japanese architects, including Toyo Ito and Fumihiko Maki, criticized Hadid's design, with Ito comparing it to a turtle and Maki calling it a white elephant; others criticized the stadium's encroachment on the outer gardens of the Meiji Shrine. Arata Isozaki, on the other hand, commented that he was "shocked to see that the dynamism present in the original had gone" in the redesign of Hadid's original plan.

The roof of the new stadium was particularly problematic from an engineering perspective, as it required the construction of two steel arches 370 metres (1,210 ft) long. Even after design changes, the stadium was estimated to cost over 300 billion yen, more than three times the cost of the London Olympic Stadium and more than five times the cost of the Beijing Olympic Stadium.

The Japanese government reached an agreement in June 2015 with Taisei Corporation and Takenaka Corporation to complete the stadium for a total cost of around 250 billion yen. The new plan maintained the steel arch design while reducing the permanent capacity of the stadium to 65,000 in track mode with an additional 15,000 simple temporary seats available, allowing for an 80,000 capacity for football and the 2019 Rugby World Cup.

However, on 17 July 2015, Prime Minister of Japan Shinzo Abe announced that plans to build the new National Stadium would be scrapped and rebid upon amid public discontent over the stadium's building costs. As a result, Abe said that a replacement venue would have to be selected for the Rugby World Cup, as the new stadium would not be ready until the 2020 Olympics.

In August 2015, the Japanese government released new standards for the National Stadium's reconstruction. The fixed capacity would be 68,000 and be expandable to 80,000 through the use of temporary seats over the athletics track. The government also abandoned the retractable roof; instead a permanent roof was to be constructed over the spectator seating only.

A sports museum and sky walkway that were part of the scrapped design were also eliminated, while VIP lounges and seats were reduced, along with reduced underground parking facilities. These reductions result in a site of 198,500 square meters, 13% less than originally planned.

To further reduce costs, air conditioning for the stadium was abandoned upon request of Japanese Prime Minister Shinzō Abe. Together with the fact that the roof was constructed over the spectator seating only, this led to concerns over indoor temperatures. When asked about the abandonment, Minister for the Olympics Toshiaki Endo stated that, "Air conditioners are installed in only two stadiums around the world, and they can only cool temperatures by 2 or 3°C".

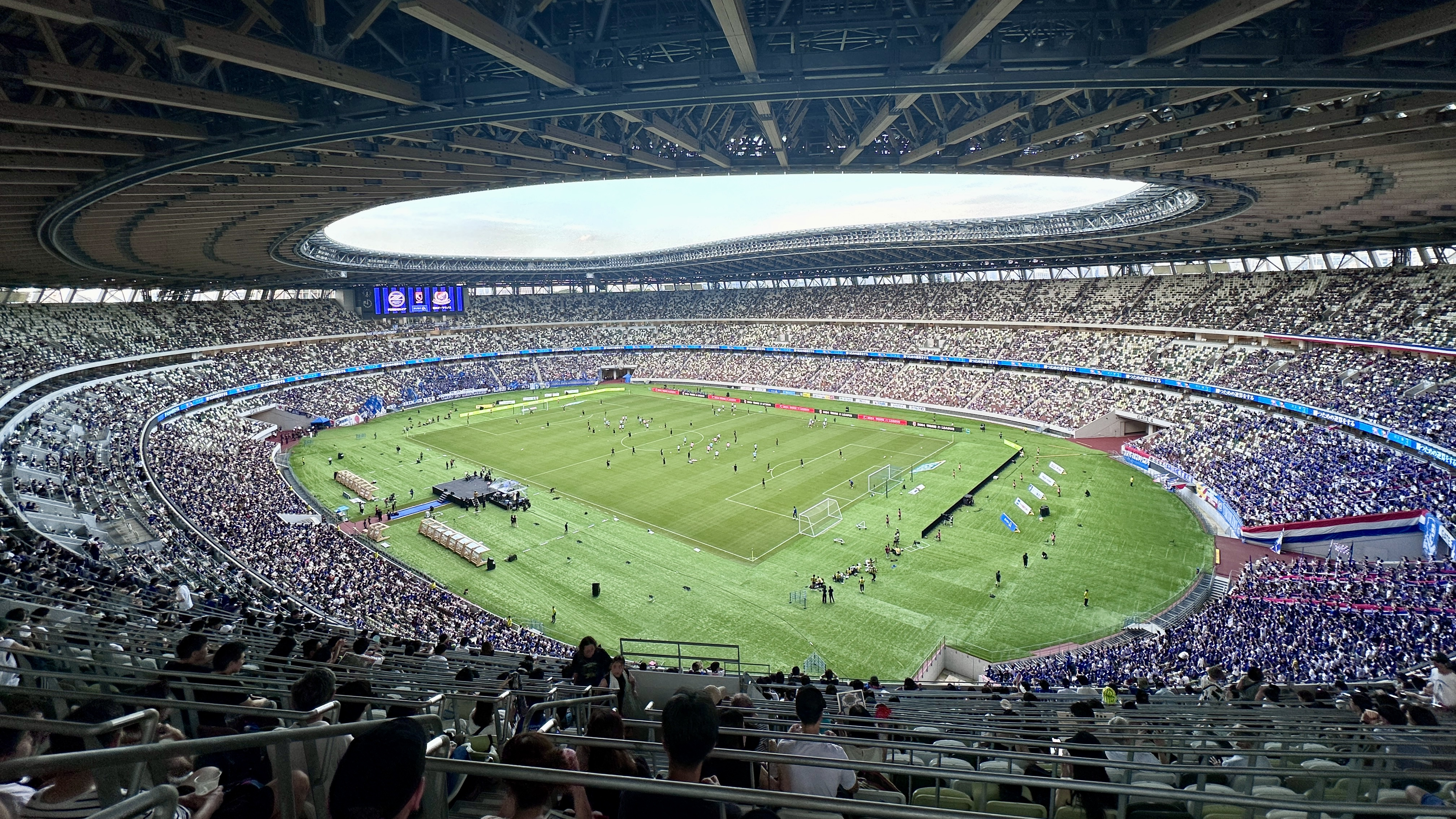
The stadium in 2024

The government slated a decision on contractors and a design by December 2015, with construction to begin at its latest in December 2016. Designers partnered with contractors to submit a design alongside construction cost and timing estimates. It has been revealed that the athletics track will be a permanent feature not to be demolished for the additional 12,000 seats for any future World Cup bid. As of 18 September 2015, two contractors submitted bids for the process: the Taisei Corporation working with architect Kengo Kuma, and a consortium of several major Japanese contractors including the Takenaka, Shimizu, and Obayashi corporations working with architect Toyo Ito. Former winning architect Zaha Hadid was unable to find a (Japanese) contractor willing to work with her design, and was therefore forced to abandon efforts to resubmit her revised design in the new competition.

On 21 December 2015, the Japan Sport Council announced that Kuma and the Taisei Corporation had been selected to design and construct the National Olympic Stadium. The stadium began construction in December 2016, and was set to conclude on 30 November 2019 when the stadium would be handed over to the International Olympic Committee (IOC) for necessary games and ceremony preparations, including test events. The new design would hold 68,089 in athletics mode with the ability to construct temporary seating over the permanent track to create an increased capacity of 80,016. Capacity during the Olympic Games was originally planned to be 60,102 taking into account press and executive seating areas, along with broadcasting equipment. This capacity would be lessened for the Paralympics to 57,750 to add more handicap accessible seating. However, all events were held behind closed doors due to the COVID-19 pandemic.

The inauguration took place on 21 December 2019 with a special ceremony. The stadium's inaugural sporting event, the 2019 Emperor's Cup final, took place on 1 January 2020.

In October 2021, the Government of Japan decided to change their plans and decide to keep the athletics track, scrapping the initial plan of removing it for an increased capacity for football and rugby matches, which was originally set in 2017. Additionally, it was announced that the stadium was bidding for hosting the 2025 World Athletics Championships. The 2025 Athletics Championships were the first major spectator event for athletics at the stadium, and were the first major sporting event in Japan with full capacity attendances since the COVID-19 pandemic in the early 2020s .

As part of celebration of the 30th anniversary of J. League, the stadium announced as venue for two games in May 2023. Home team FC Tokyo won 2–1 against the 10-men Kawasaki Frontale on 12 May. Kashima Antlers faced Nagoya Grampus two days later.

After the operating rights to the stadium were franchised in April 2025, reports surfaced that financial group MUFG is expected to acquire the naming rights of the National Stadium starting in 2026.

== Concerts ==
List of concerts
Date	Main act(s) + opening act(s)	Tour/concert name
3 November 2020 (Taped on 23–24 Oct)	Arashi	Arafes
27–28 August 2022	Eikichi Yazawa	Eikichi Yazawa 50th Anniversary Tour "My Way"
27–28 April 2024	Ado	Ado Special Live 2024 Shinzou
19–20 April 2025	Snow Man	Snow Man 1st Stadium Live～Snow World～
13–14 December 2025		Music Bank Global Festival
4–5 April 2026	One Ok Rock	The Music Stadium 2026 organized by One Ok Rock
11–12 April 2026	Sakurazaka46	5th Year Anniversary Live
18–19 April, 4–5 July 2026	Mrs. Green Apple	「Zenjin Mito to Im/Mutable」
25–26, 28 April 2026	Twice	This Is For World Tour
20–21 June 2026	=LOVE	=LOVE Stadium Live 「Beyond "Kyun"」

== International football matches ==
Date	Competition	Team1	Result	Team2	Attendance
6 June 2022	Friendly	Japan	0–1	Brazil	63,638
24 March 2023	Friendly	Japan	1–1	Uruguay	61,855
1 January 2024	Friendly	Japan	5–0	Thailand	61,916
21 March 2024	World Cup qualifier	Japan	1–0	North Korea	59,354
18 November 2025	Friendly	Japan	3–0	Bolivia	53,508
31 May 2026	Friendly	Japan	1–0	Iceland	62,212
5 October 2026	Friendly	Ecuador	1–1 (6–7 pen.)	Panama	14,364
5 October 2026	Friendly	Japan	2–1	New Zealand	61,812

== International rugby test matches ==
Date	Competition	Team1	Result	Team2	Attendance
9 July 2022	2022 France tour of Japan	Japan	15–20	France	57,011
22 November 2022	2022 Autumn internationals	Japan	31–38	New Zealand	65,000
22 June 2024	2024 England tour of New Zealand	Japan	17–52	England	44,029
25 October 2025	2025 Autumn internationals	Japan	15–19	Australia	41,612
18 July 2026	2026 Nations Championship	Japan	15–42	France	52,632

== Description ==
The stadium is unusual in that timber is used as a major component of the structure, all of it sourced from Japan in order to reduce environmental impact. Many of the wooden elements are in modular form, which can be replaced when the timber deteriorates. The certified wood has been sourced from all 47 prefectures of Japan following a tradition started by the Meiji Shrine. The design of the eaves was inspired by the Hōryū-ji and incorporates air spaces which make best use of the prevailing wind conditions to ventilate the interior space. Part of the roof incorporates transparent solar panels and rain water is collected in underground cisterns and is used to irrigate the arena turf as well as the numerous plants on the top storey promenade. Accessibility has been a major concern, resulting in more than 450 places for wheelchair users, as well as toilets using the latest technology.

== Gallery ==
=== Construction ===
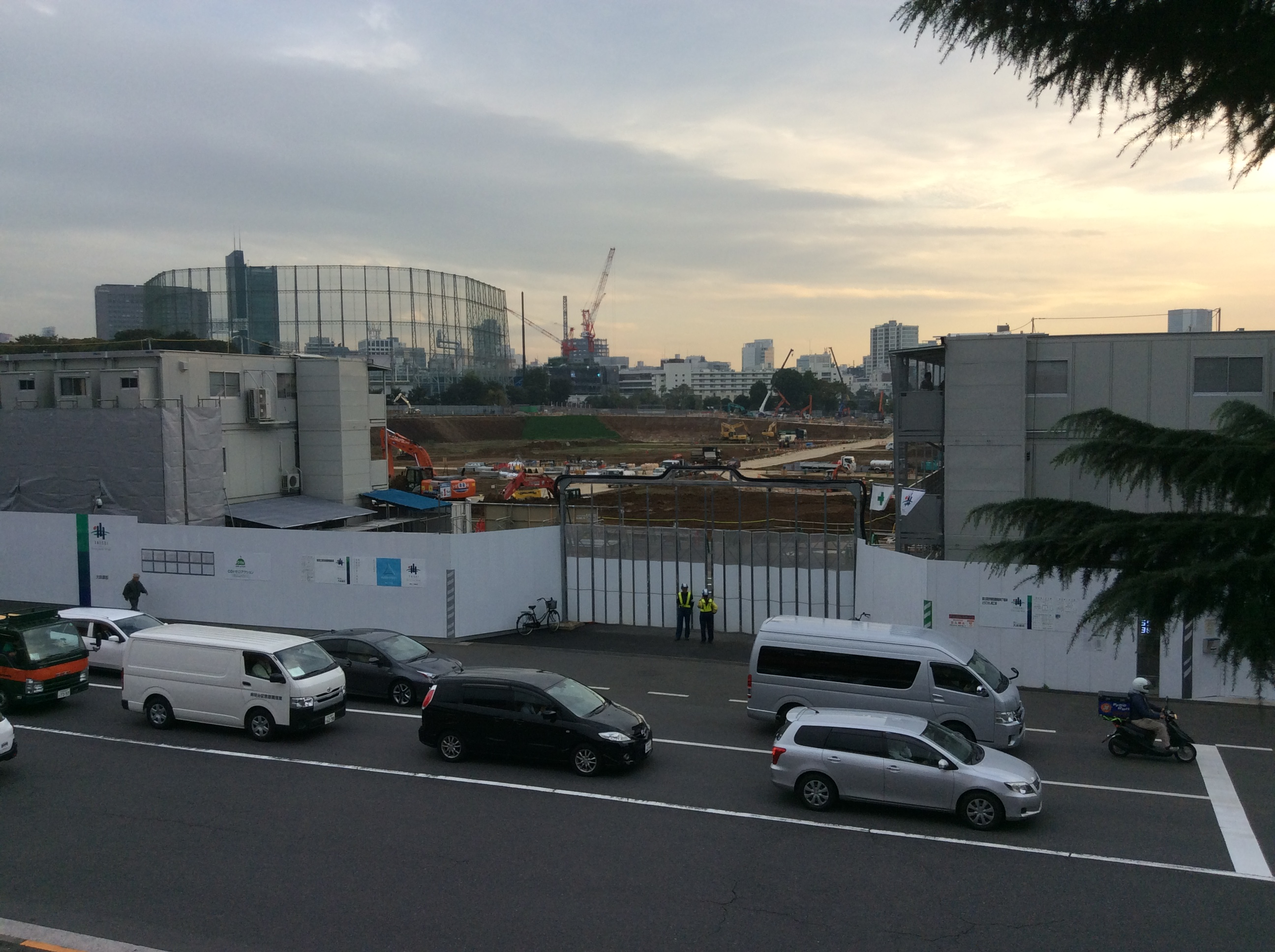
November 2016
Empty space of the stadium before construction

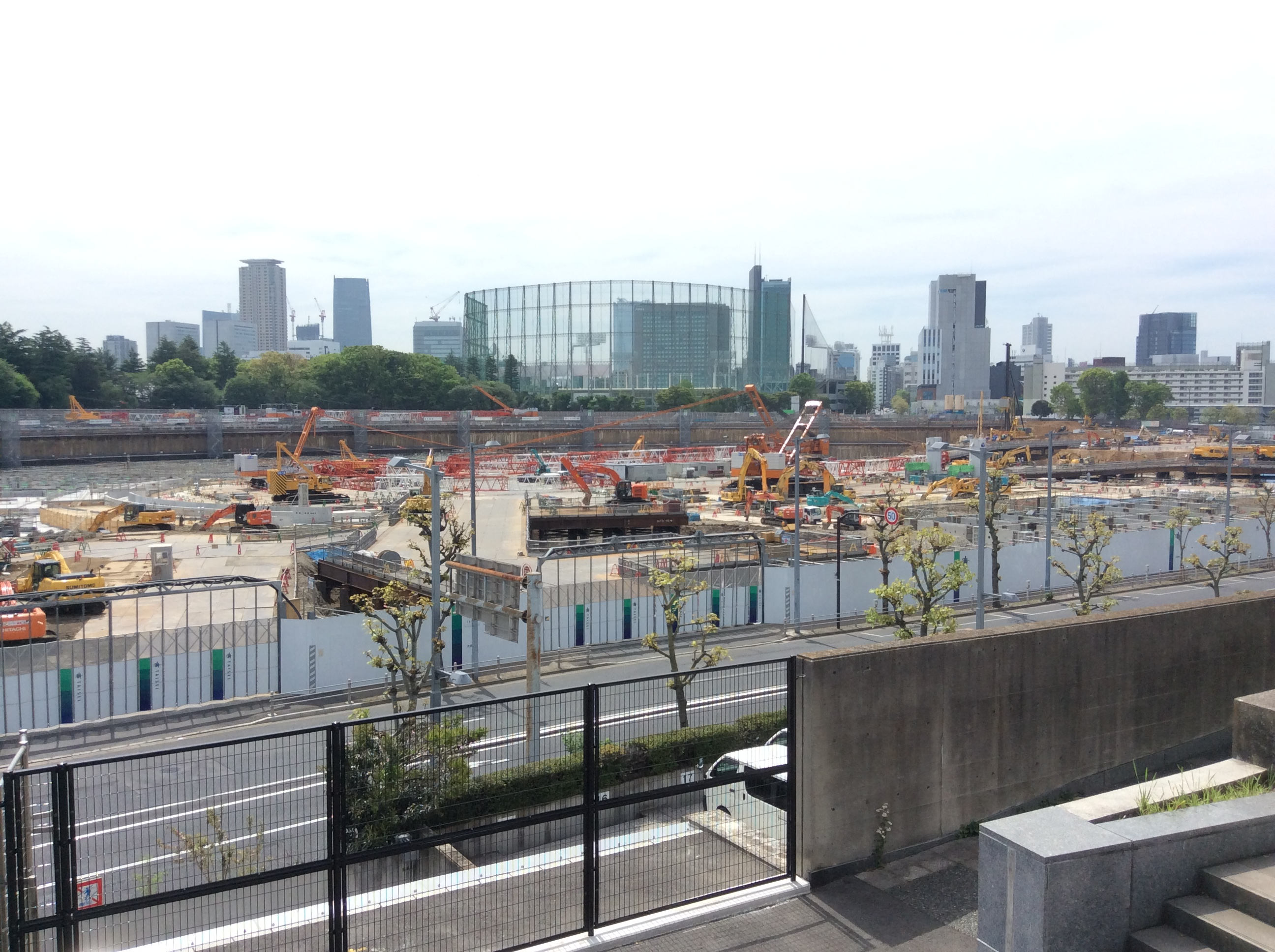
May 2017

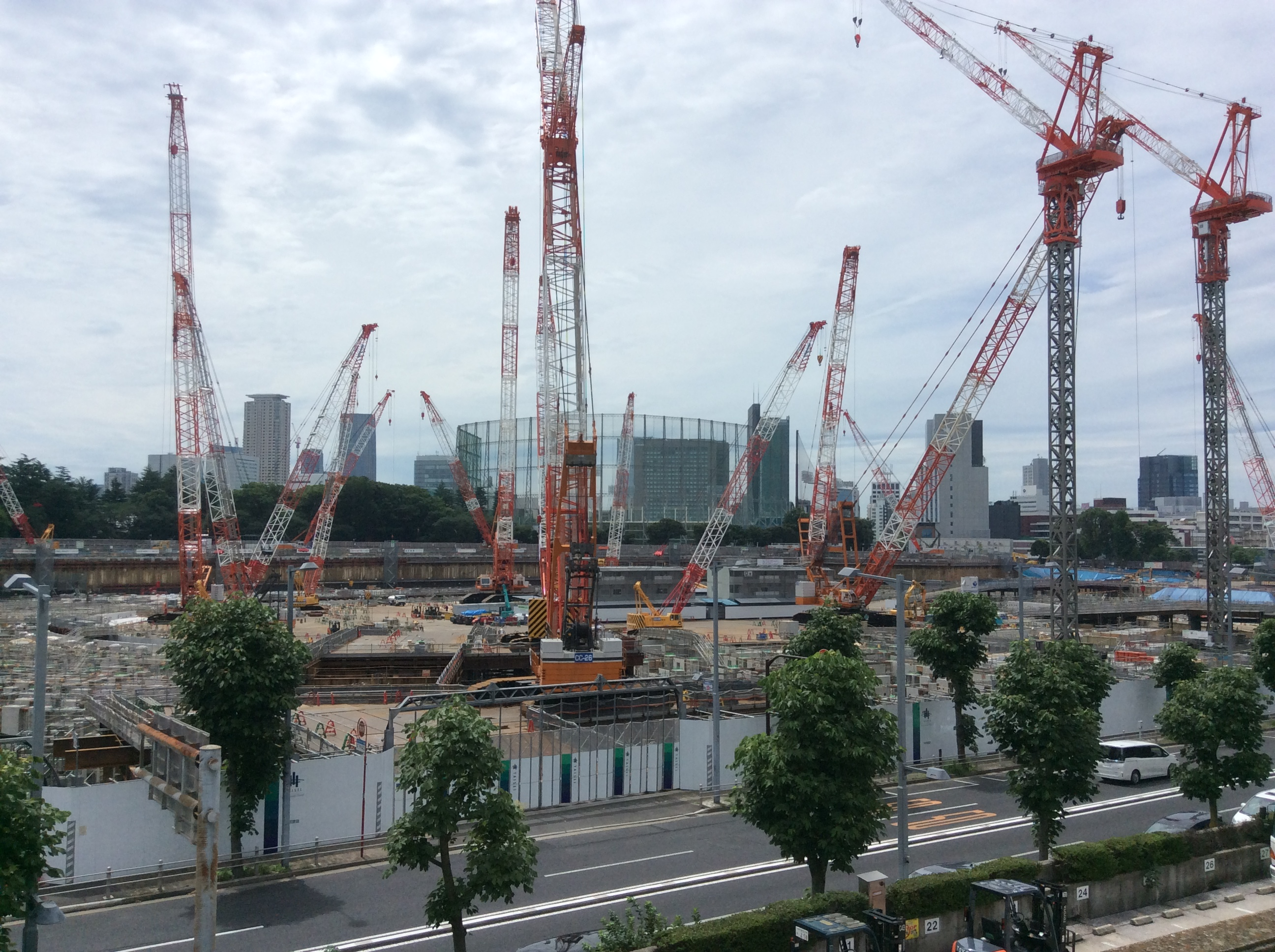
July 2017

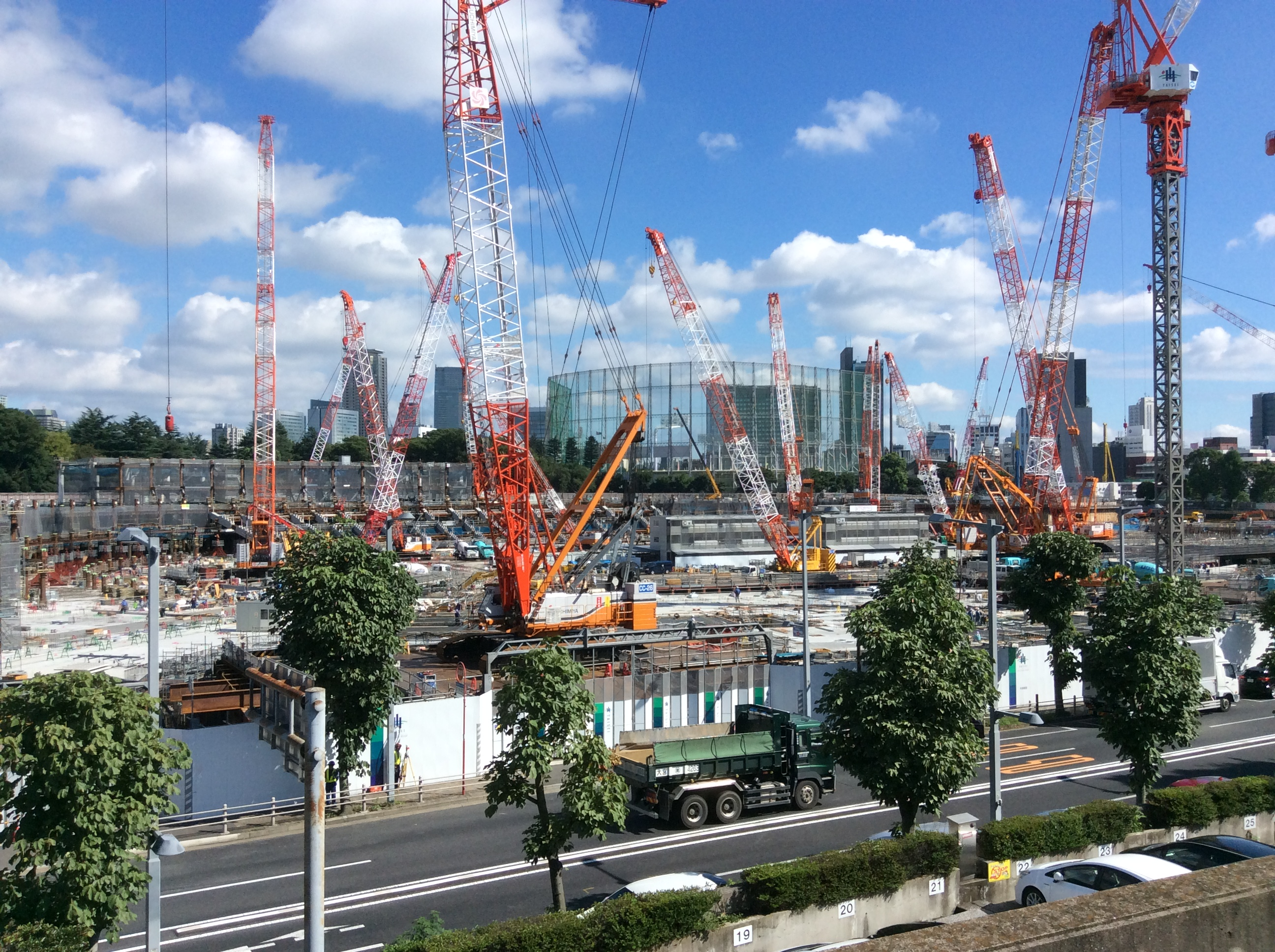
September 2017

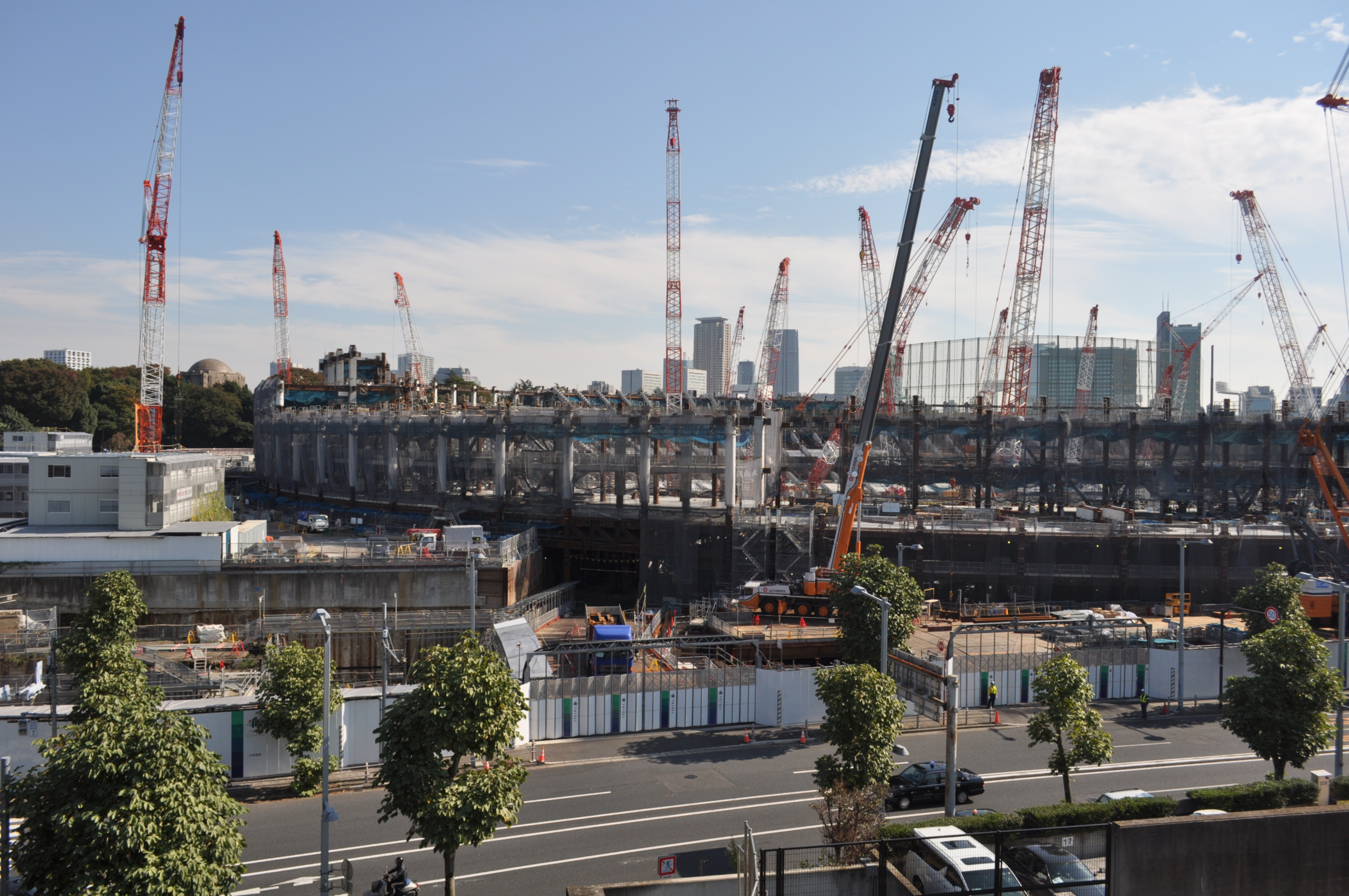
November 2017

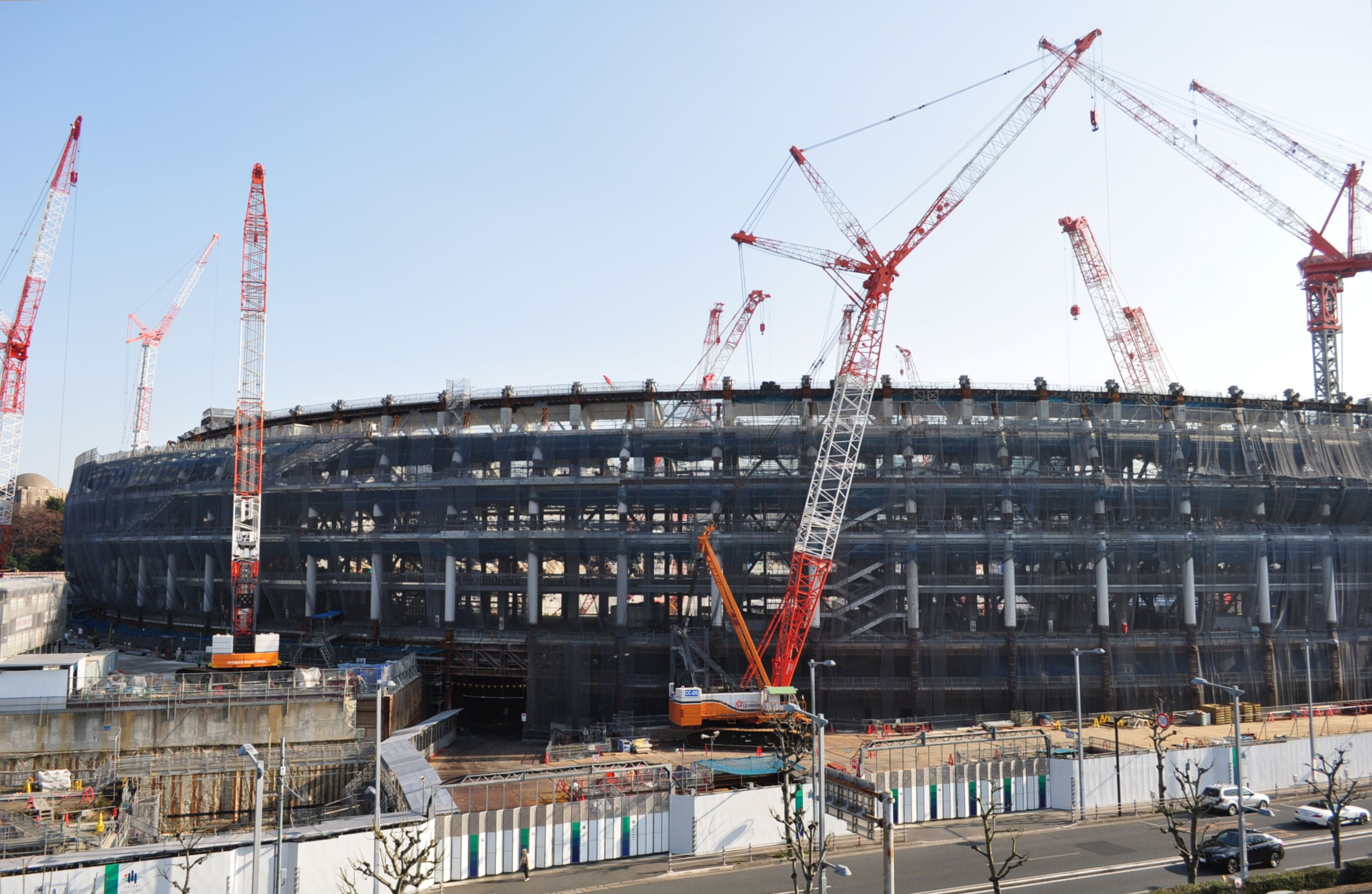
January 2018

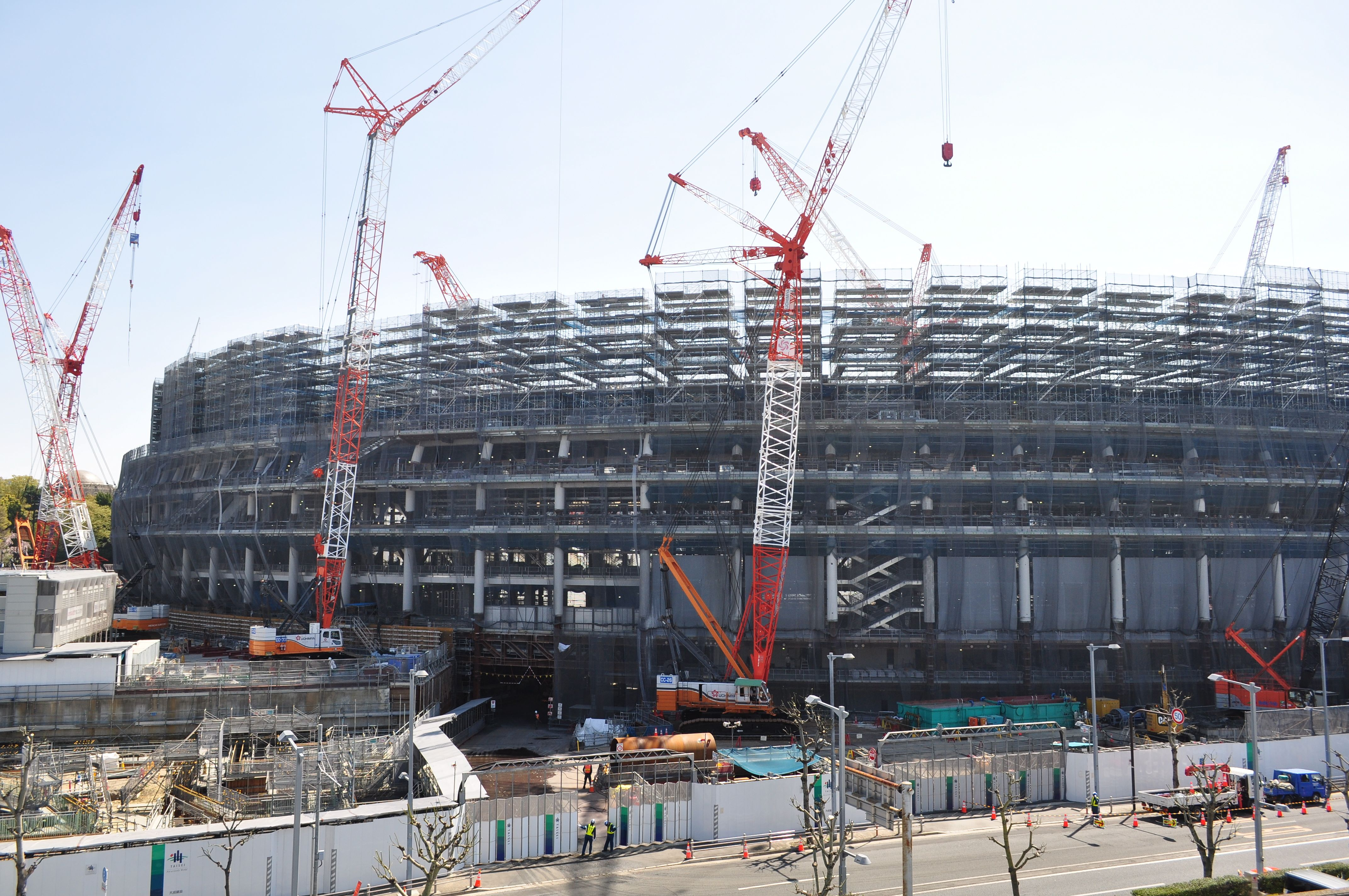
March 2018
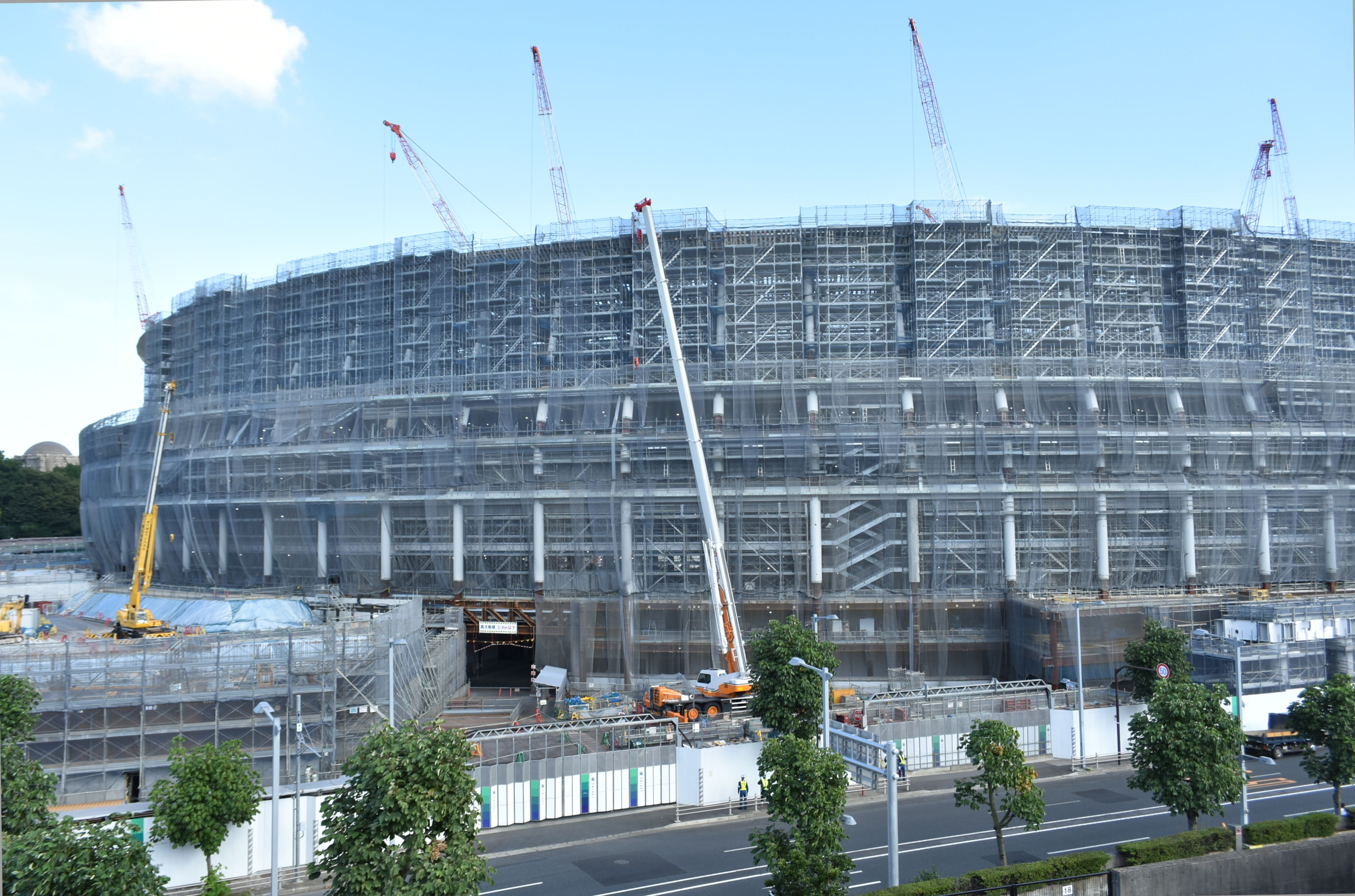
August 2018

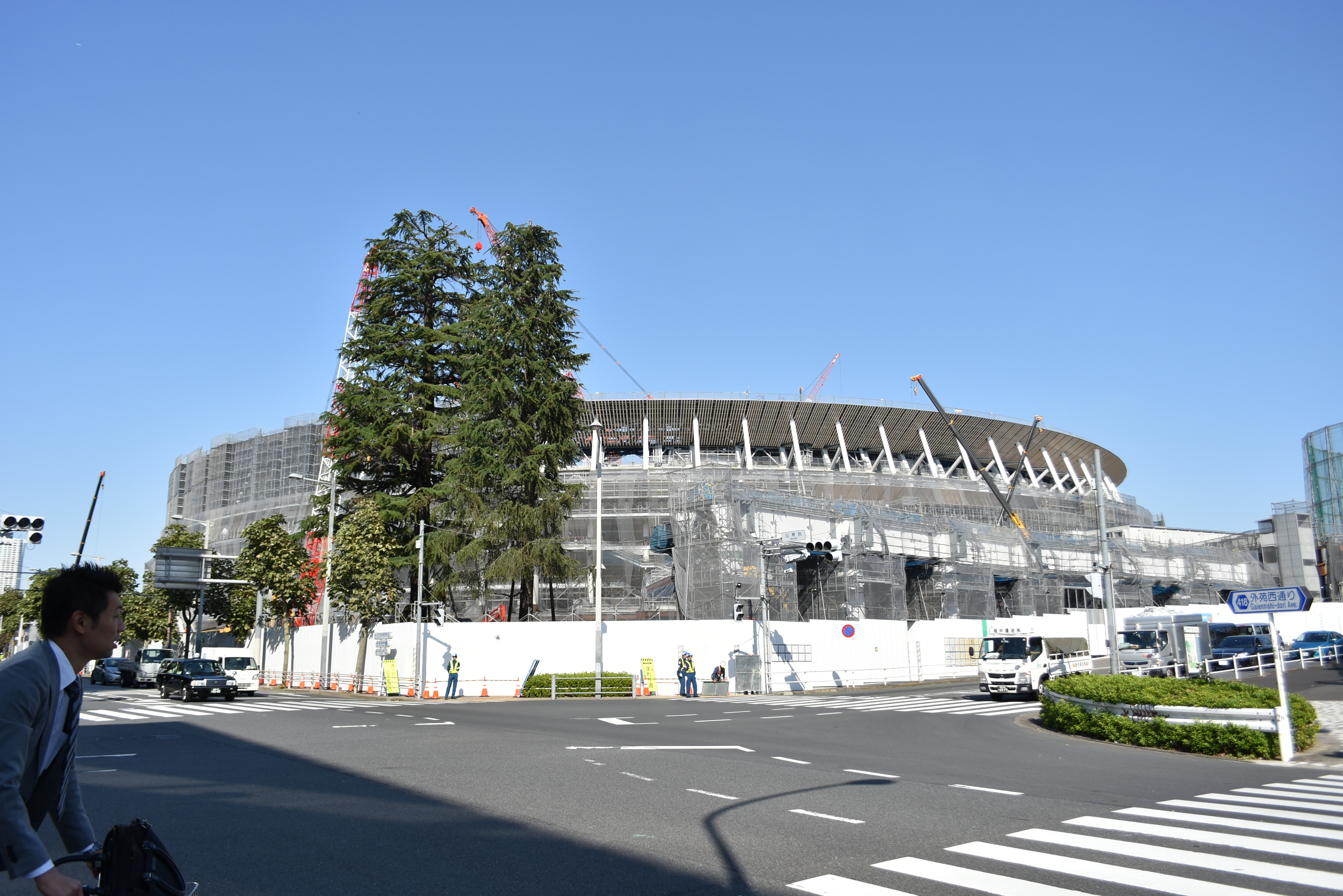
October 2018

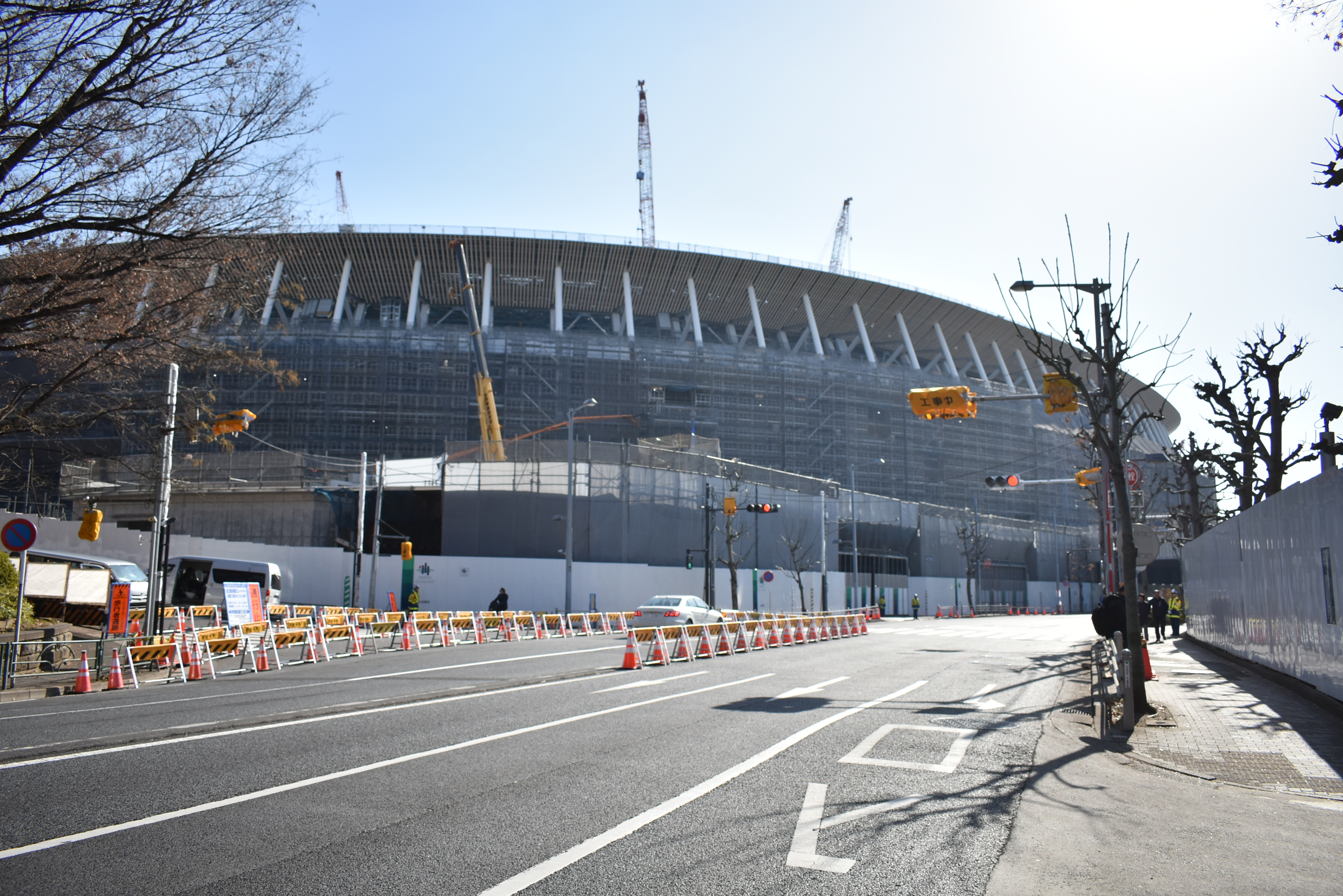
January 2019

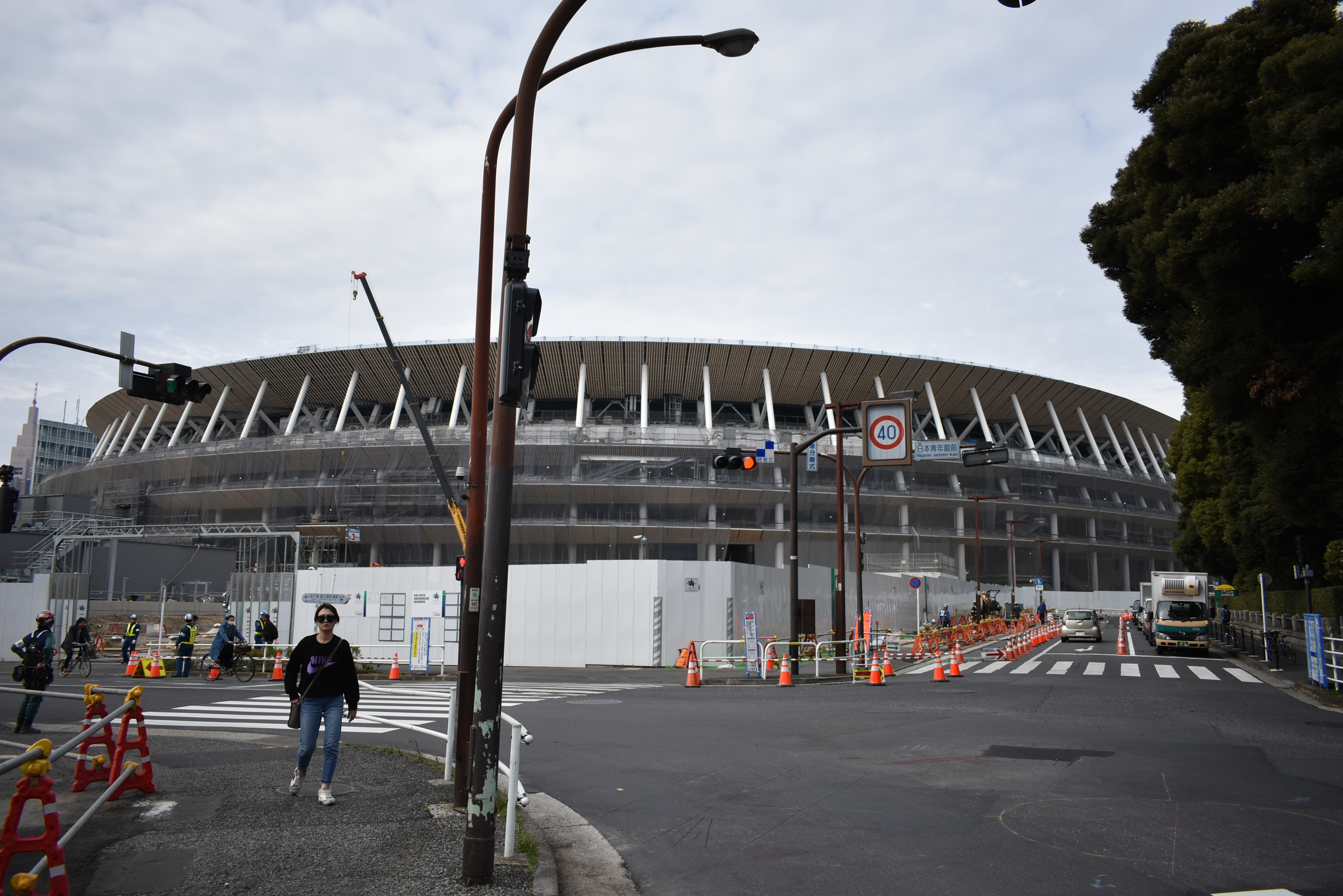
March 2019

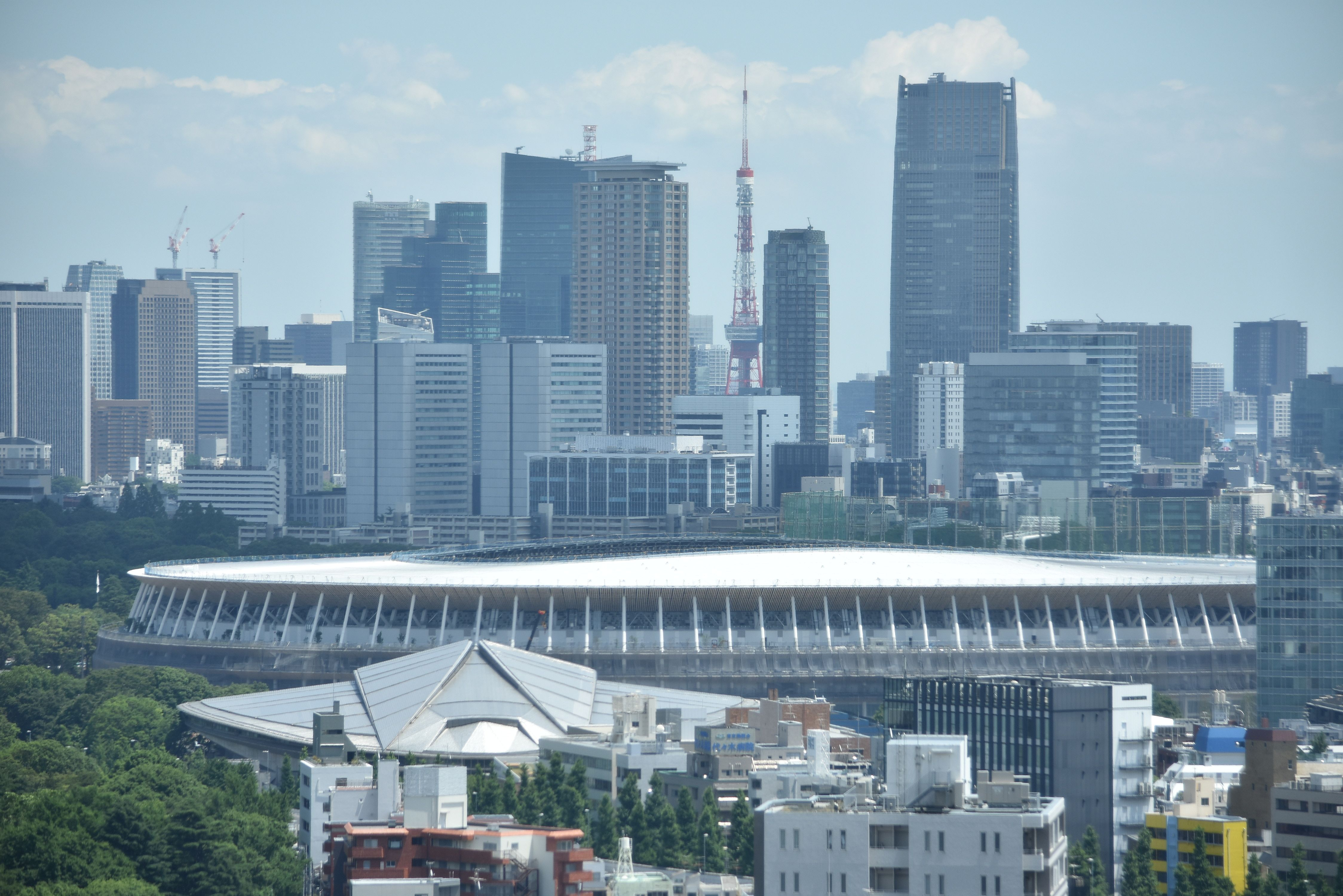
May 2019

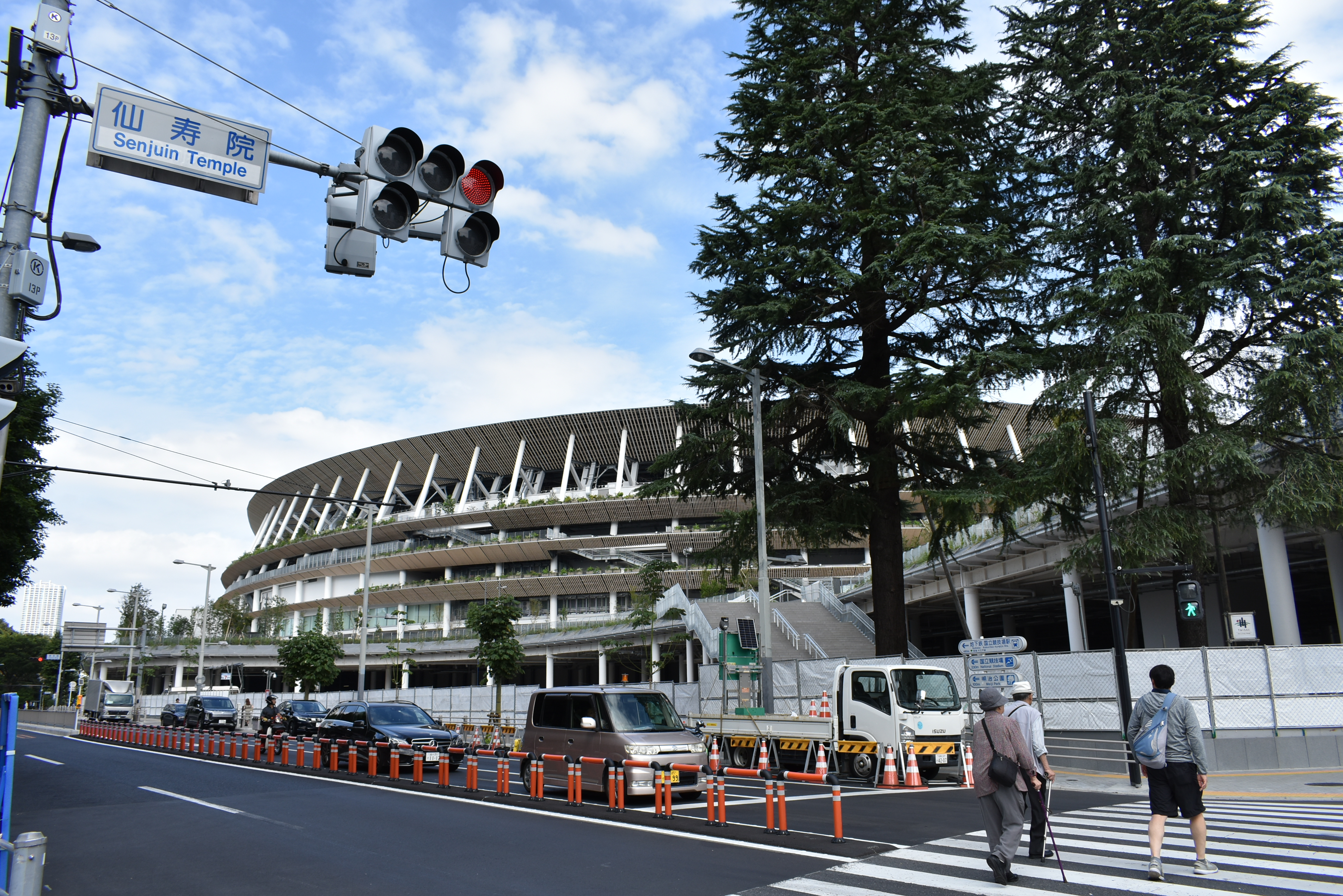
September 2019

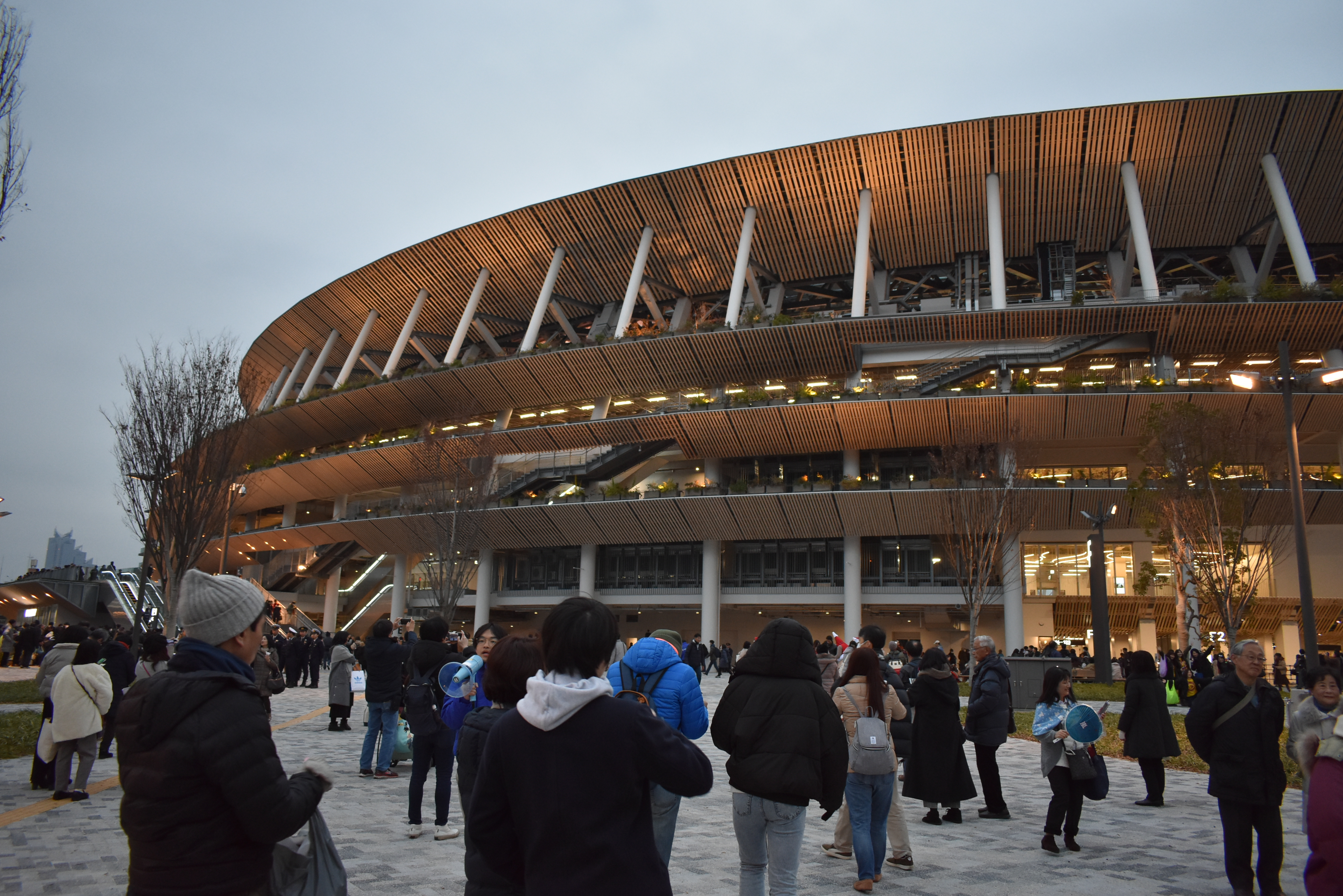
December 2019

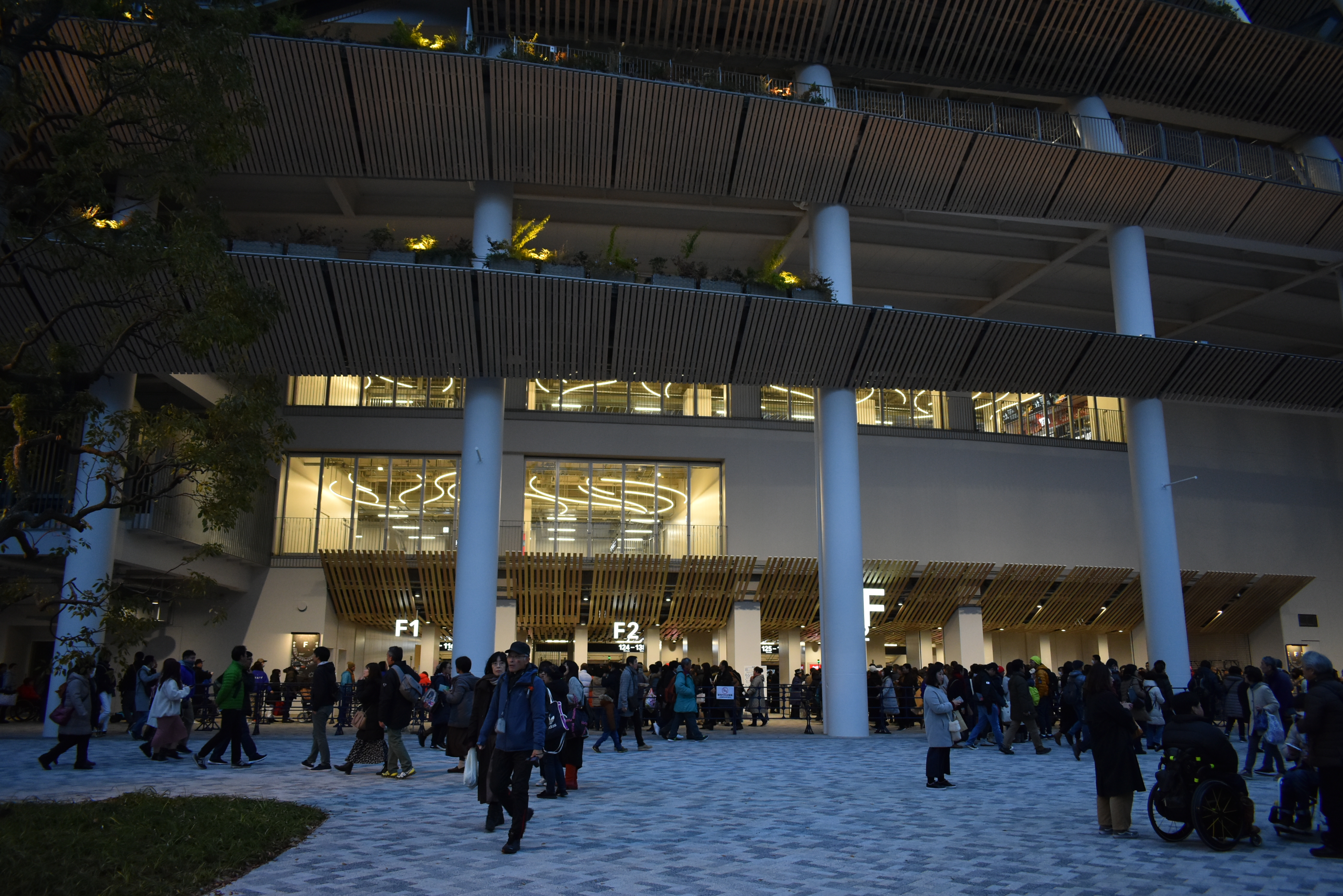
December 2019

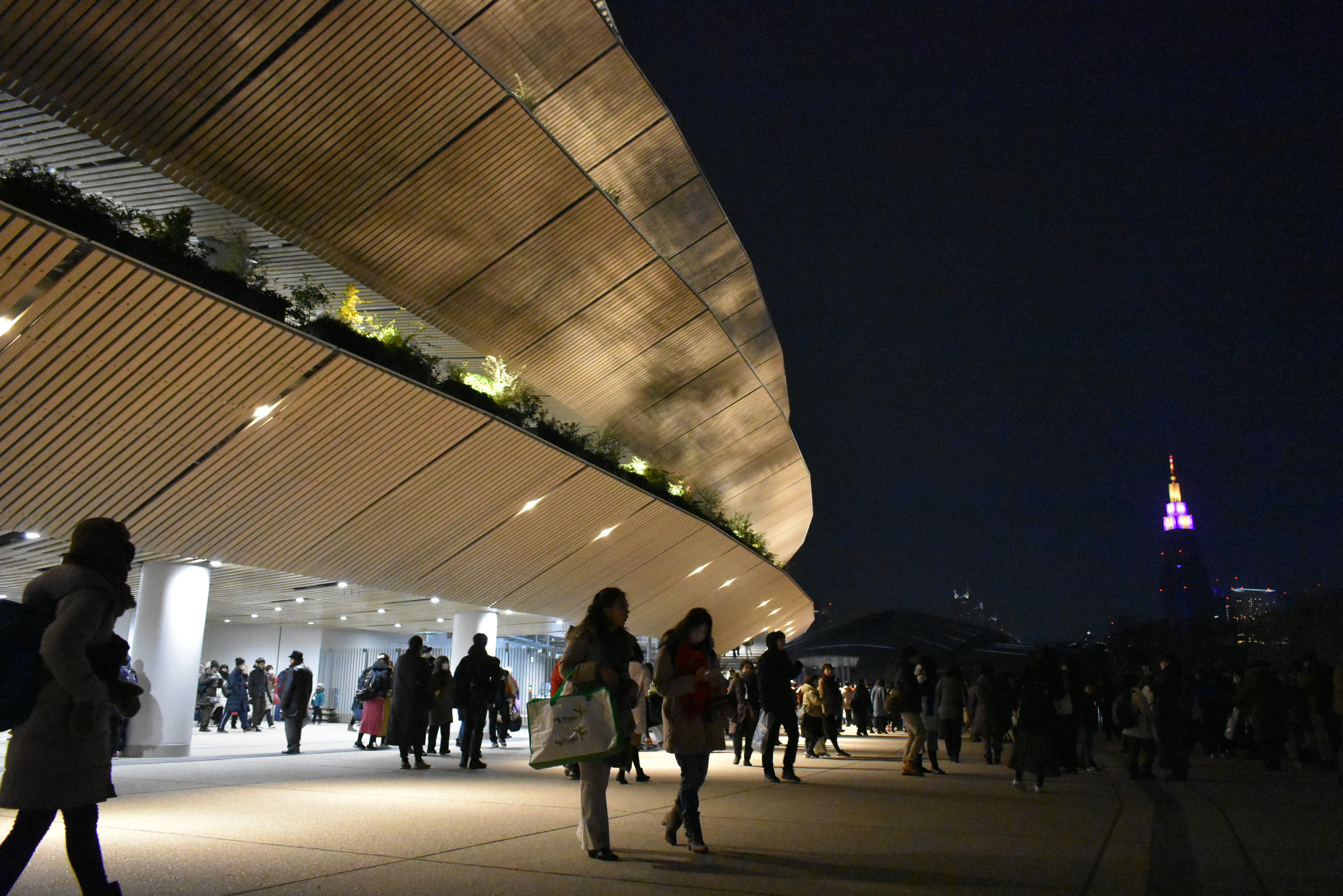
December 2019

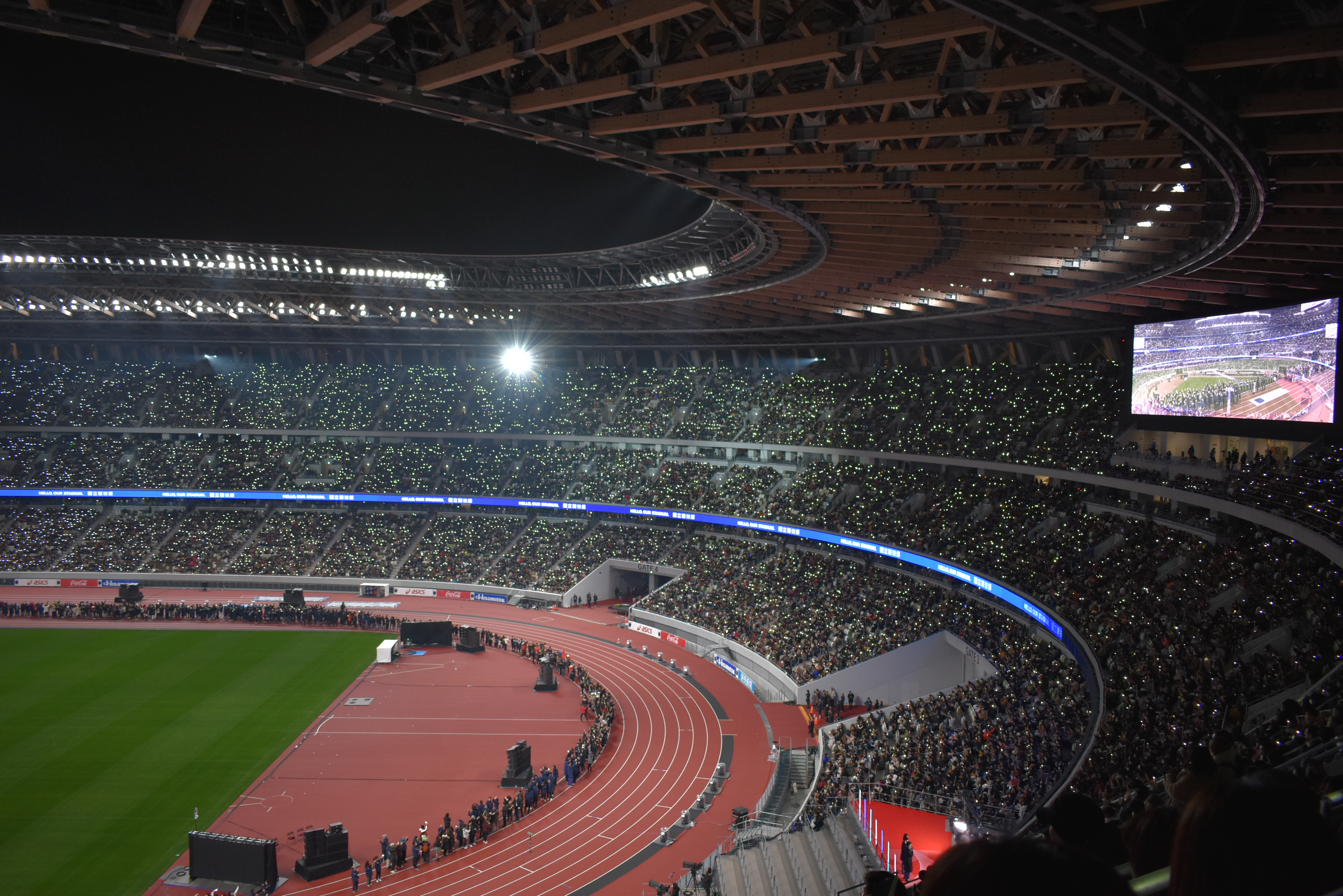
December 2019

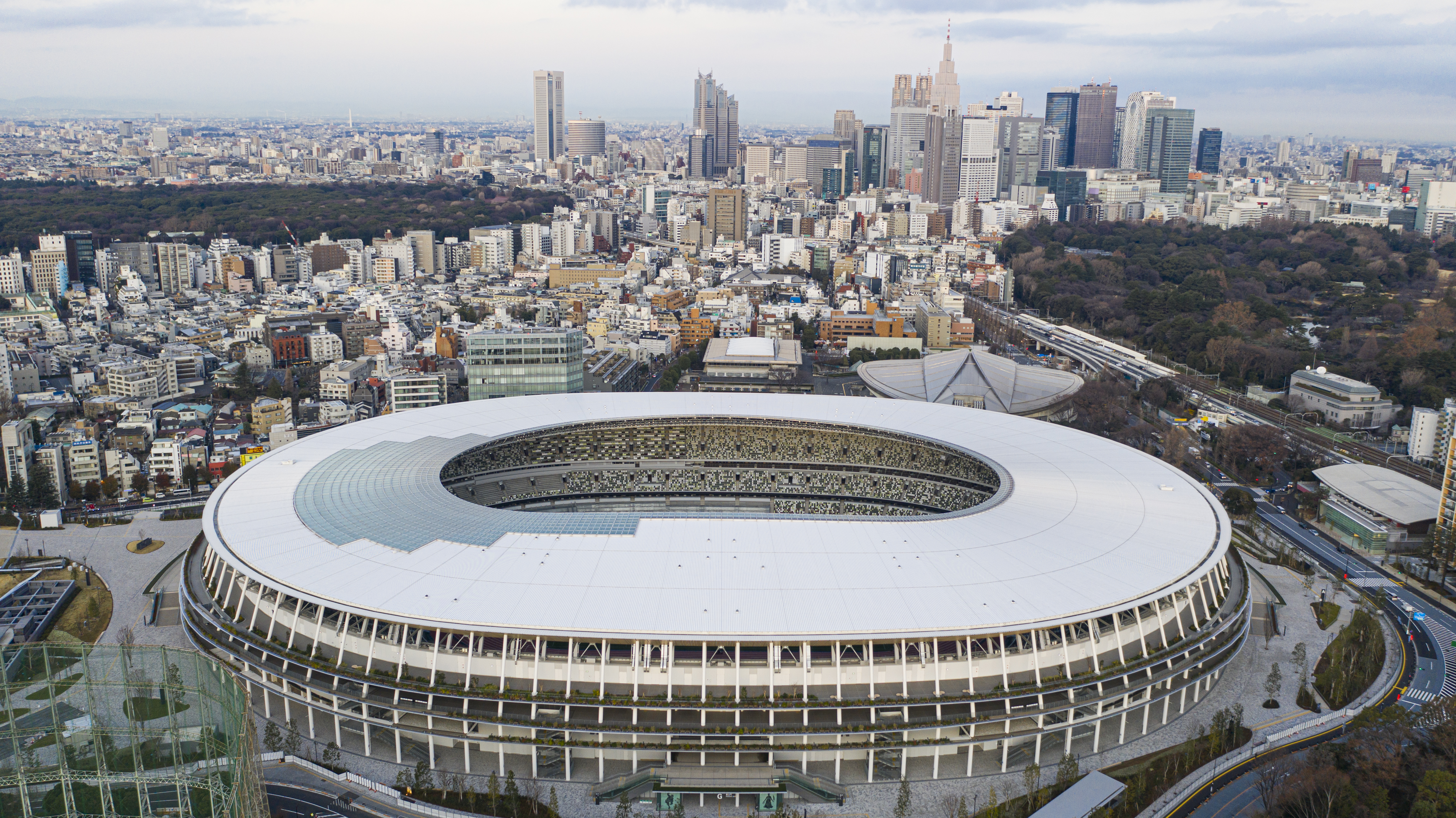
Aerial view (2020)

Preceded by Estádio do Maracanã; Rio de Janeiro	Summer Olympics; Opening and closing ceremonies venue (Olympic Stadium); 2020	Succeeded by River Seine and Jardins du Trocadéro (opening ceremony); Stade de France (closing ceremony); Paris
Preceded by Estádio Olímpico João Havelange; Rio de Janeiro	Summer Olympics; Athletics competitions Main venue 2020	Succeeded by Stade de France; Saint-Denis, Paris
Preceded by Estádio Olímpico João Havelange; Rio de Janeiro	Summer Paralympics; Athletics competitions Main venue 2020	Succeeded by Stade de France; Saint-Denis, Paris
