= Shinjuku Center Building =

Skyscraper in Tokyo, Japan

Coordinates: 35°41′30″N 139°41′44″E

- 新宿センタービル
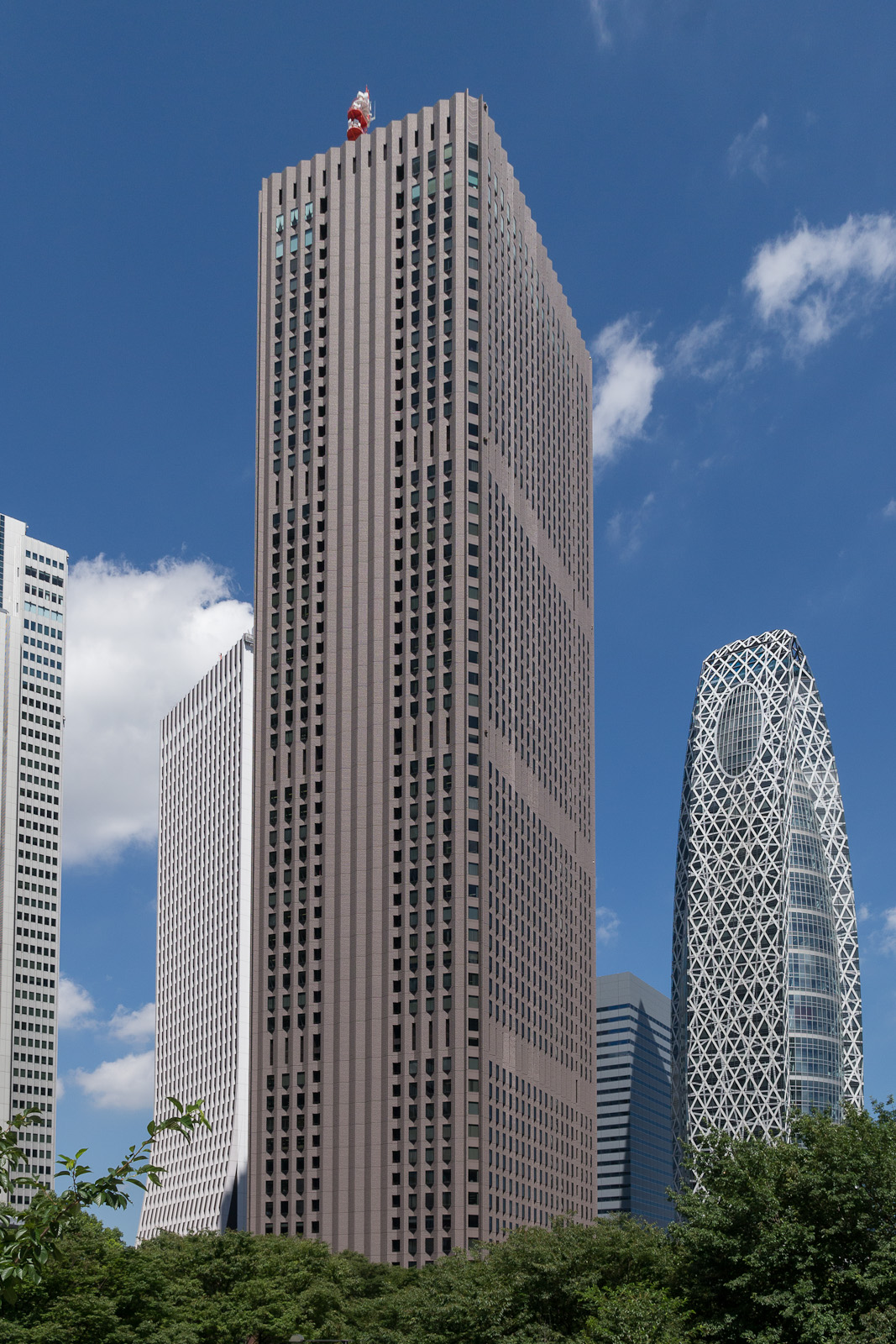

General information
- Location: 1-25-1 Nishi-Shinjuku
- Town or city: Shinjuku, Tokyo
- Country: Japan
- Completed: October 31, 1979; 45 years ago
- Owner: Tokyo Tatemono; Meiji Yasuda Life; Japan Prime Realty Investment Corporation
- Height: 222.95 metres (731.5 ft)

Technical details
- Floor count: 54 above ground 4 below ground
- Floor area: 183,063.79 m^{2} (1,970,482.2 sq ft)
- Lifts/elevators: 36 (17 by Hitachi Elevator, 8 by Toshiba・Mitsubishi Electric, 3 by Fujitec)

Design and construction
- Main contractor: Taisei Corporation

The Shinjuku Center Building (新宿センタービル, Shinjuku Sentā Biru) is a skyscraper in the Nishi-Shinjuku business district in Shinjuku, Tokyo, Japan. It has a height of 223 metres and 54 floors. The building opened on October 31, 1979 and was fully renovated in 1998. It serves as the headquarters of the Taisei Corporation. The Shinjuku Center Building serves as a workplace for 10,000 people, and is visited by over 25,000 people daily.

In 2009, the building was the first in the world to be retrofit with seismic dampers to suppress the vibrations caused by long-period ground motion of earthquakes. A total of 288 oil dampers were installed on floors 15 through 39. As a result, during the Great East Japan earthquake of 2011, the damping ratio was higher and the response lower by 20% than it would have been without the dampers.

The building made an appearance in the 1984 film The Return of Godzilla.

French climber Alain Robert successfully scaled the building in 1998 and was arrested for trespassing once he reached the top.

Japan Prime Realty Investment Corporation (a Japanese real estate investment trust) acquired the building in 2008 for 21 billion yen.
