= Tetsuro Yoshida =

Japanese architect

Tetsurō Yoshida
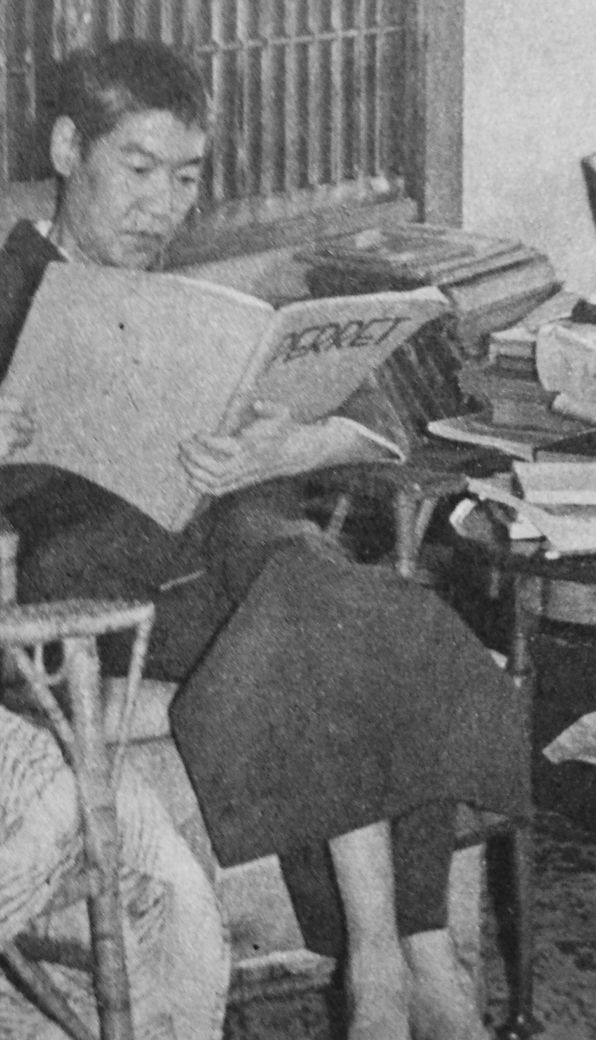
- Yoshida in 1949
- Born: 18 May 1894; Toyama, Japan
- Died: 8 September 1956; Suginami-ku, Tokyo, Japan

Tetsuro Yoshida (吉田 鉄郎, Yoshida Tetsurō, May 18, 1894 - September 8, 1956) was a Japanese architect. He graduated from Tokyo University and entered the Ministry of Communications in 1919. He designed many Japanese post offices, telegraph offices, and related buildings in Japan. He introduced Eastern architecture to the west, while incorporating Western architecture in his own designs, including architecture from Scandinavia, Germany, and the United States.

== Major works ==
- Old Kyoto Central Telephone Office, 1926
- Tokyo Central Post Office, 1931
- Osaka Central Post Office, 1939
