= Nishi-Shinjuku =

Skyscraper district of Tokyo

Nishi-Shinjuku 西新宿
- Neighborhood (町丁)
- Nishi-Shinjuku skyscrapers

- Location of Nishi-Shinjuku within the Wards Area of Tokyo
- Coordinates: 35°41′22″N 139°41′31″E
- Country: Japan
- Region: Kantō
- Metropolis: Tokyo
- Ward: Shinjuku
- Time zone: UTC+9 (JST)
- Zip code: 160-0023
- Area code: 03

Nishi-Shinjuku (西新宿; lit. 'West Shinjuku') is a neighborhood and skyscraper business district in Shinjuku Ward, Tokyo, Japan. The neighborhood is located west of Shinjuku Station and consists of 8 chōme (丁目), or Streets. The region was previously called Tsunohazu (角筈).

== History ==
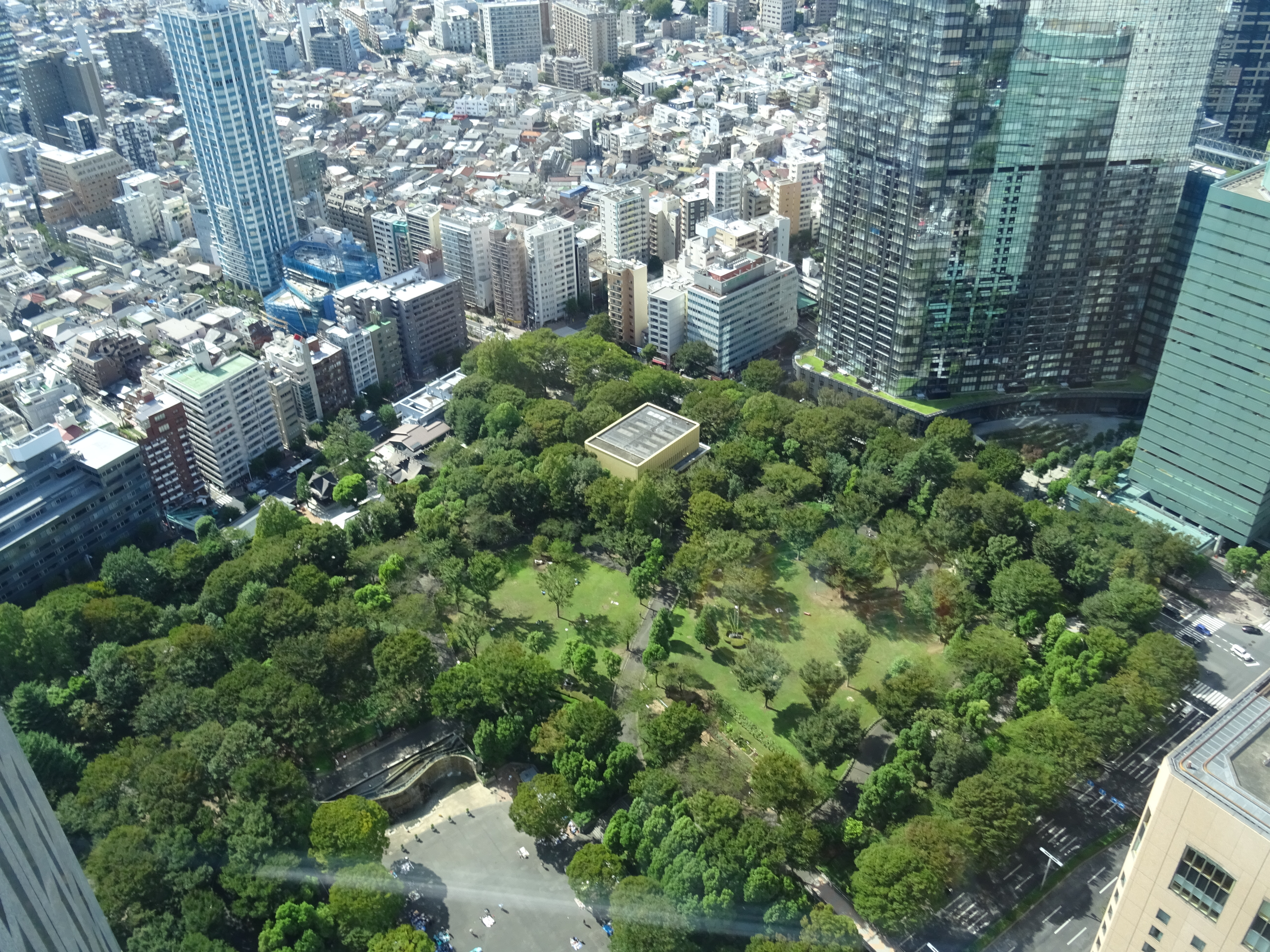
Shinjuku Central Park

Nishi-Shinjuku was Tokyo's first major foray into building skyscrapers with the first appearing in the 1970s with Keio Plaza Inter-Continental. It is the location of the Tokyo Metropolitan Government Building, the headquarters of the Tokyo Metropolitan Government.

Progress continues in Nishi-Shinjuku, which is heading away from the city centre and has the site of the proposed Nishi-Shinjuku 3-Chōme Redevelopment, with plans for what will be three of the four tallest buildings in Japan.

The last scene of the 2003 film Lost in Translation was filmed at Chūō-dōri close to Shinjuku train station.

== Economy ==
Livedoor has its headquarters in the Sumitomo Fudosan Nishishinjuku Building (住友不動産西新宿ビル, Sumitomo Fudōsan Nishi-Shinjuku Biru). H.I.S. has its headquarters in the Shinjuku Oak Tower. Seiko Epson's Tokyo Office is in the Shinjuku NS Building. Capcom's Tokyo offices are located in the Shinjuku Mitsui Building and Keihin Corporation is headquartered in the Shinjuku Nomura Building. Taisei Corporation also has its headquarters in the district.

== Amenities ==
Amenities include Shinjuku Central Park (Shinjuku Chūō Park), and the Juniso Kumano Shrine adjacent to the park.

== Skyscrapers ==
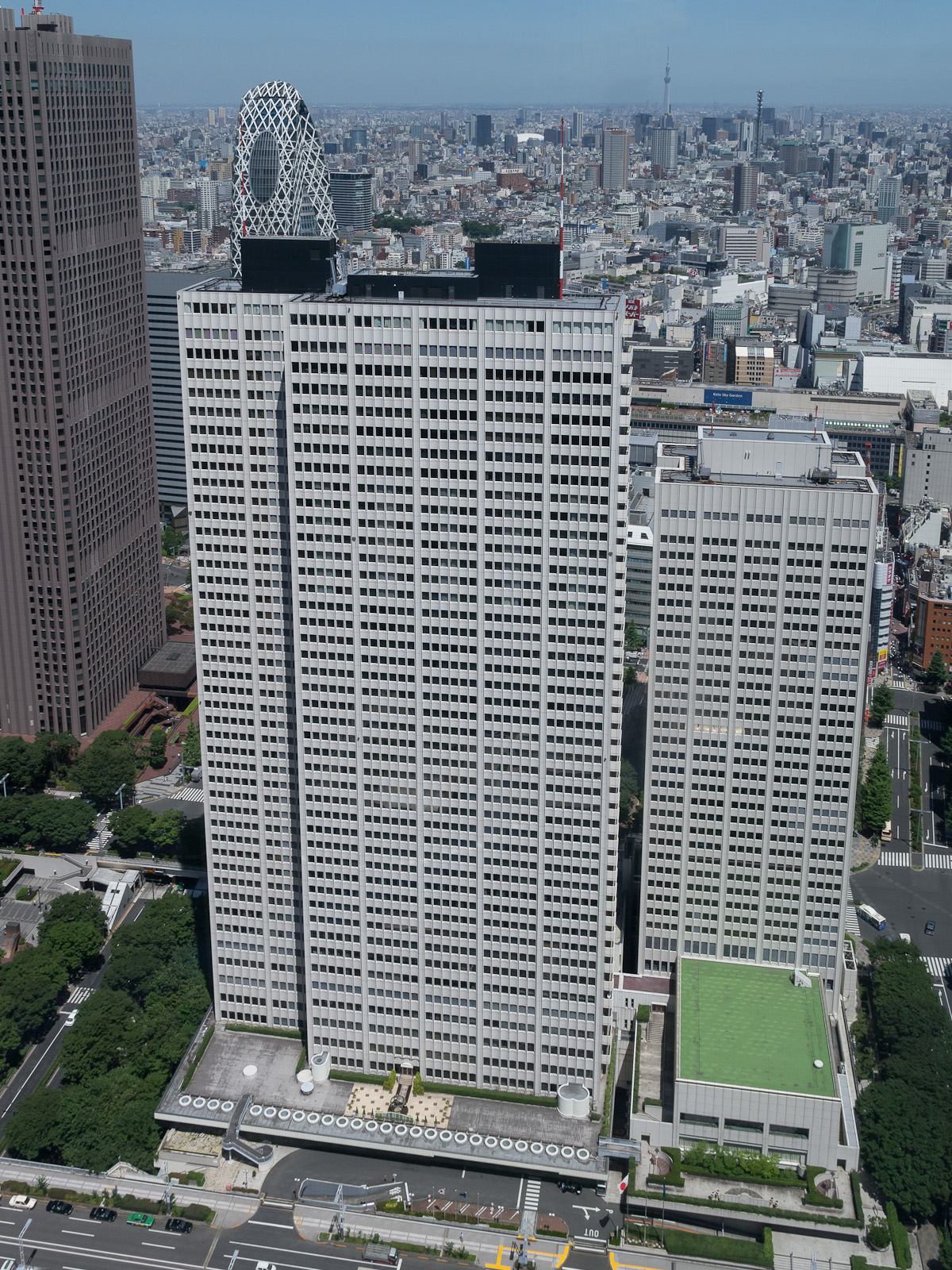
Keio Plaza Hotel (1971)

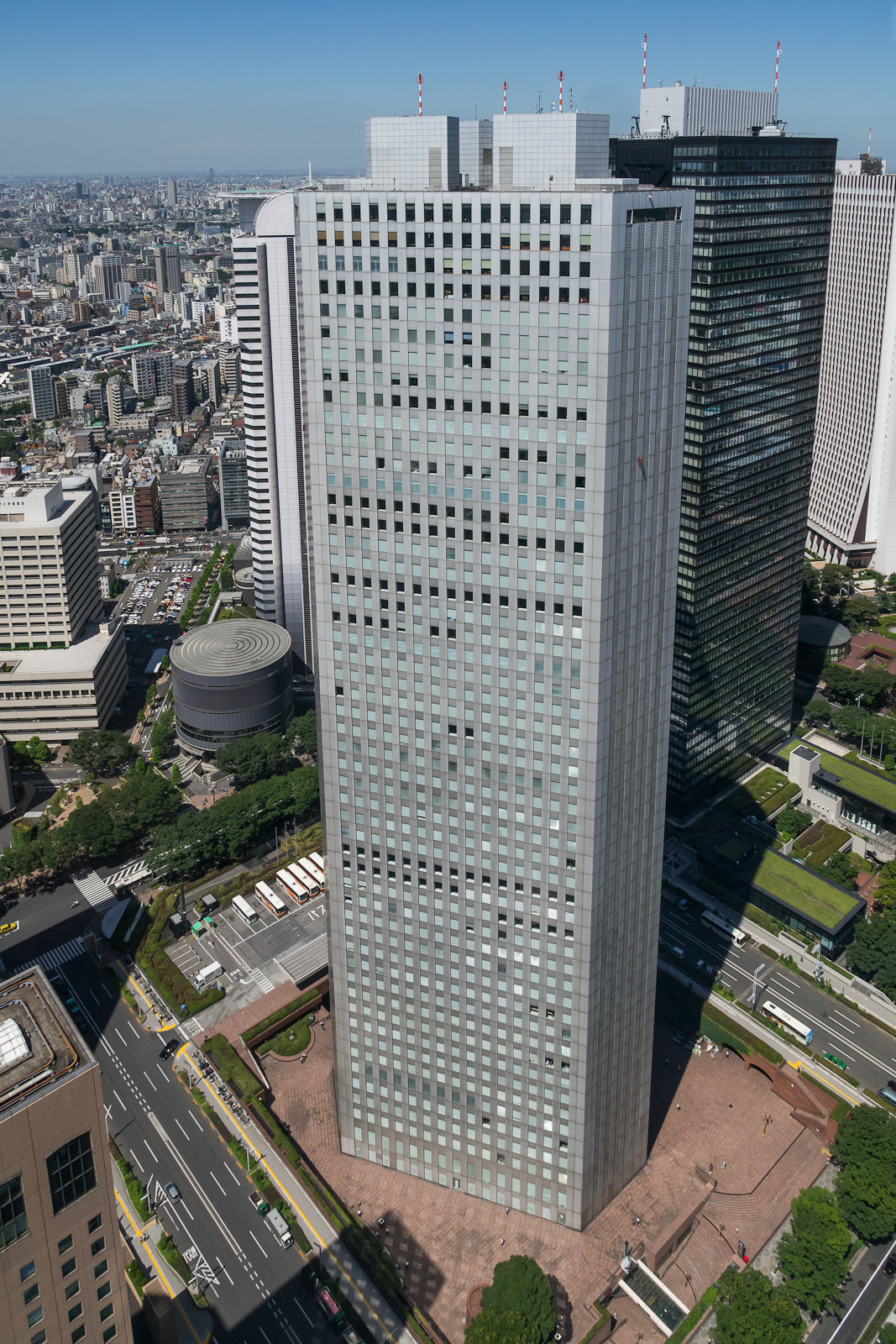
Shinjuku Sumitomo Building (1974)

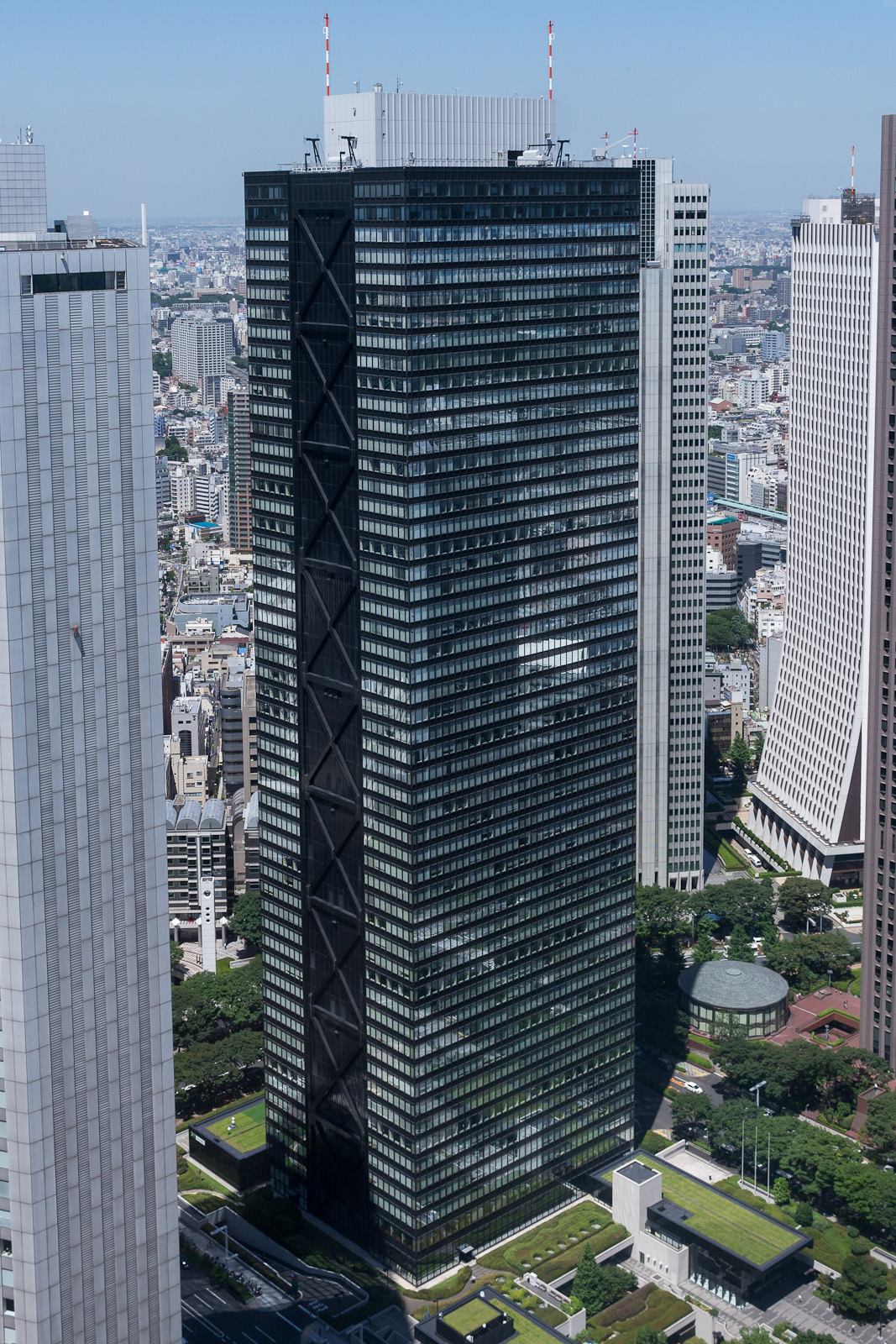
Shinjuku Mitsui Building (1974)

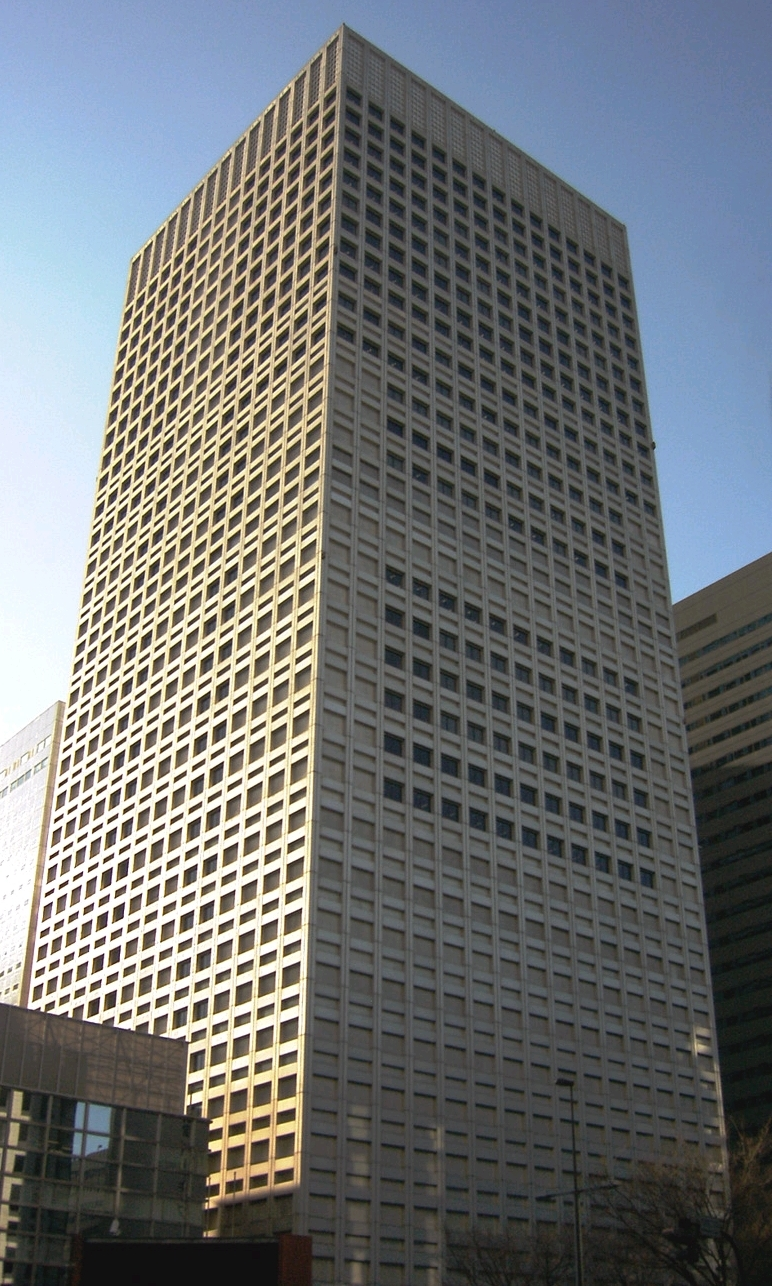
Shinjuku KDDI Building (ex-KDD Honsha Building) (1974)

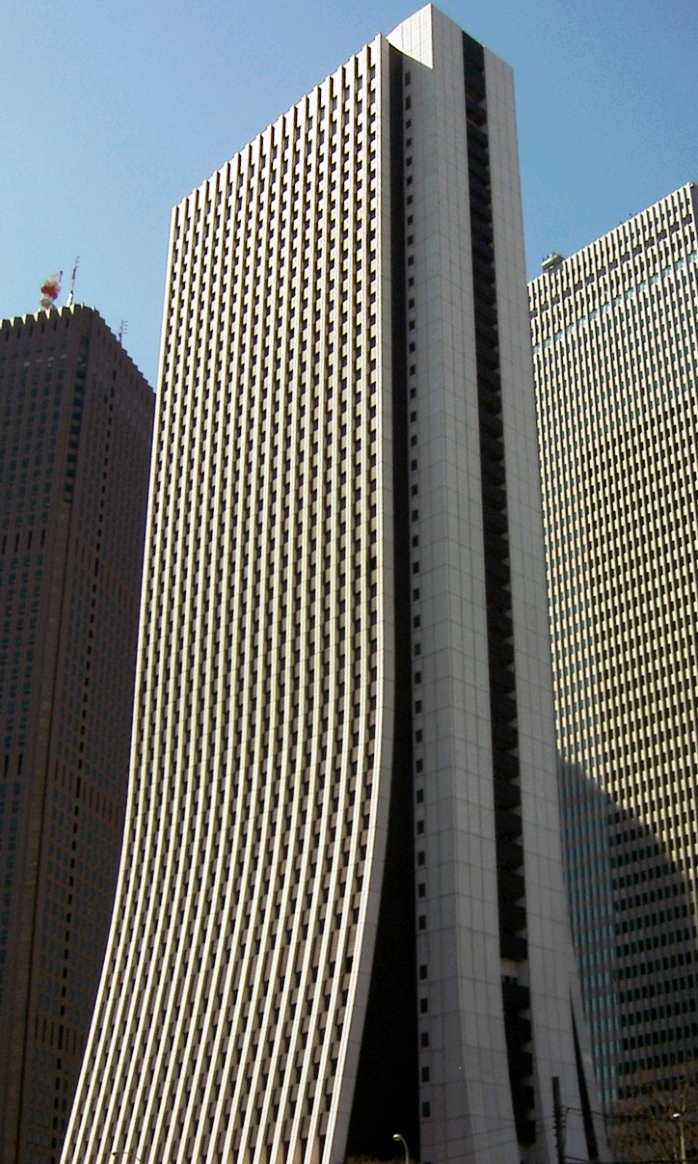
Shinjuku Sompo Japan Building (ex-Yasuda Kasai Kaijo) (1976)

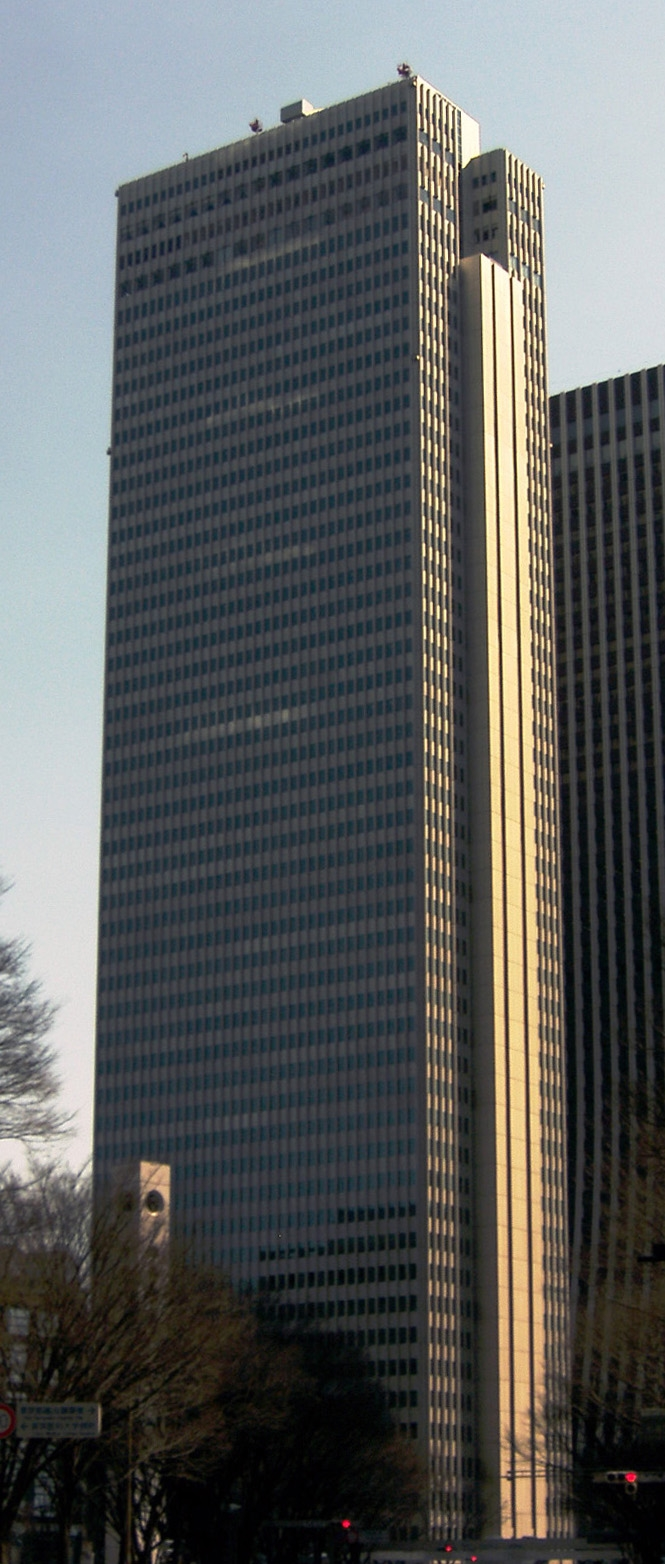
Shinjuku Nomura Building (1978)

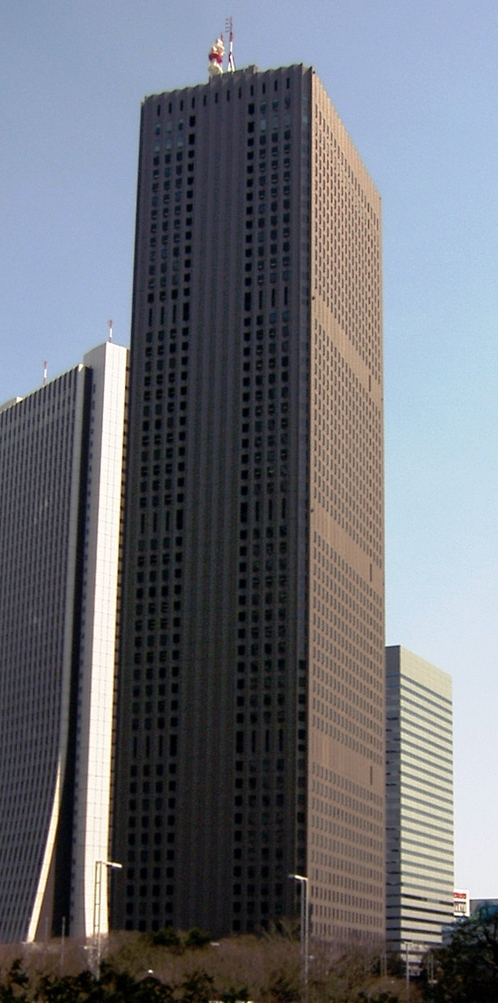
Shinjuku Center Building (1979)

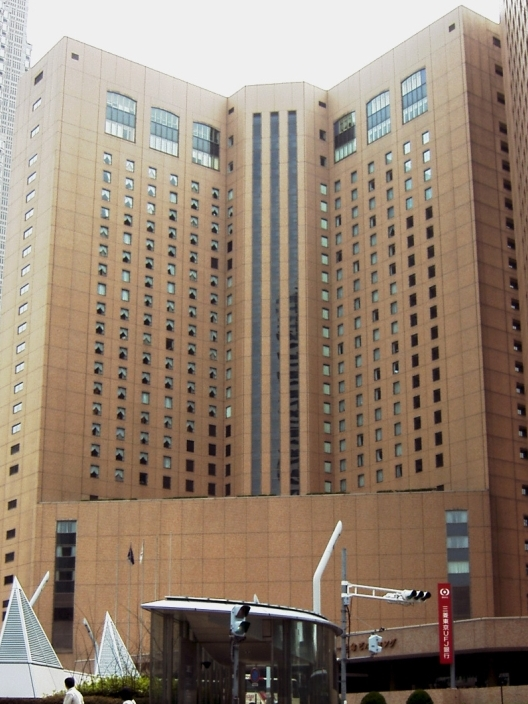
Hyatt Regency Tokyo (1980)

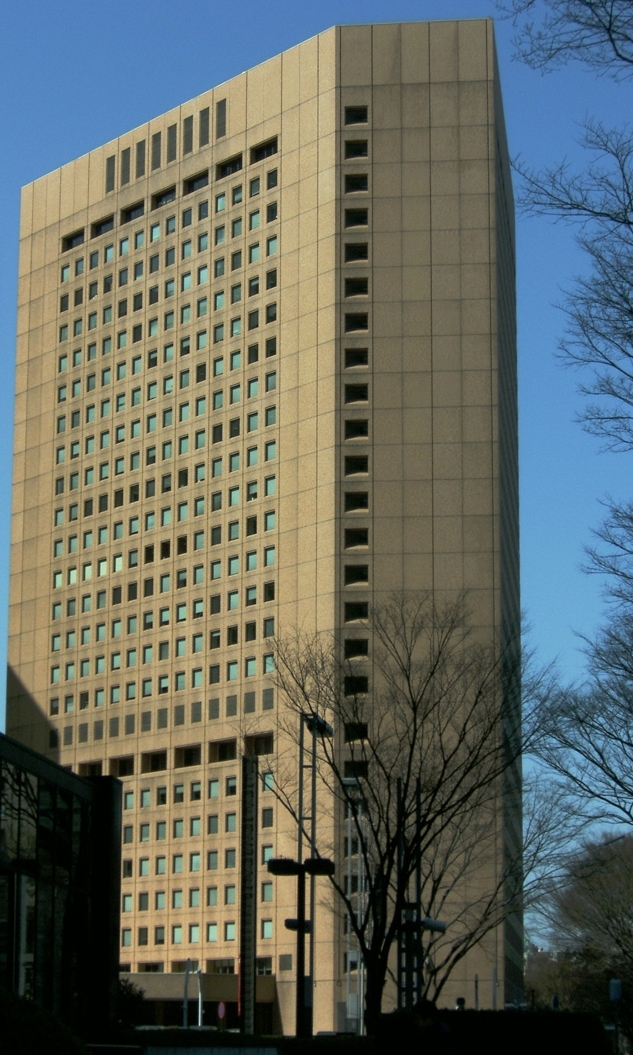
Odakyu Dai-ichi-seimei Building (ex-Shinjuku Dai-ichi-seimei) (1980)

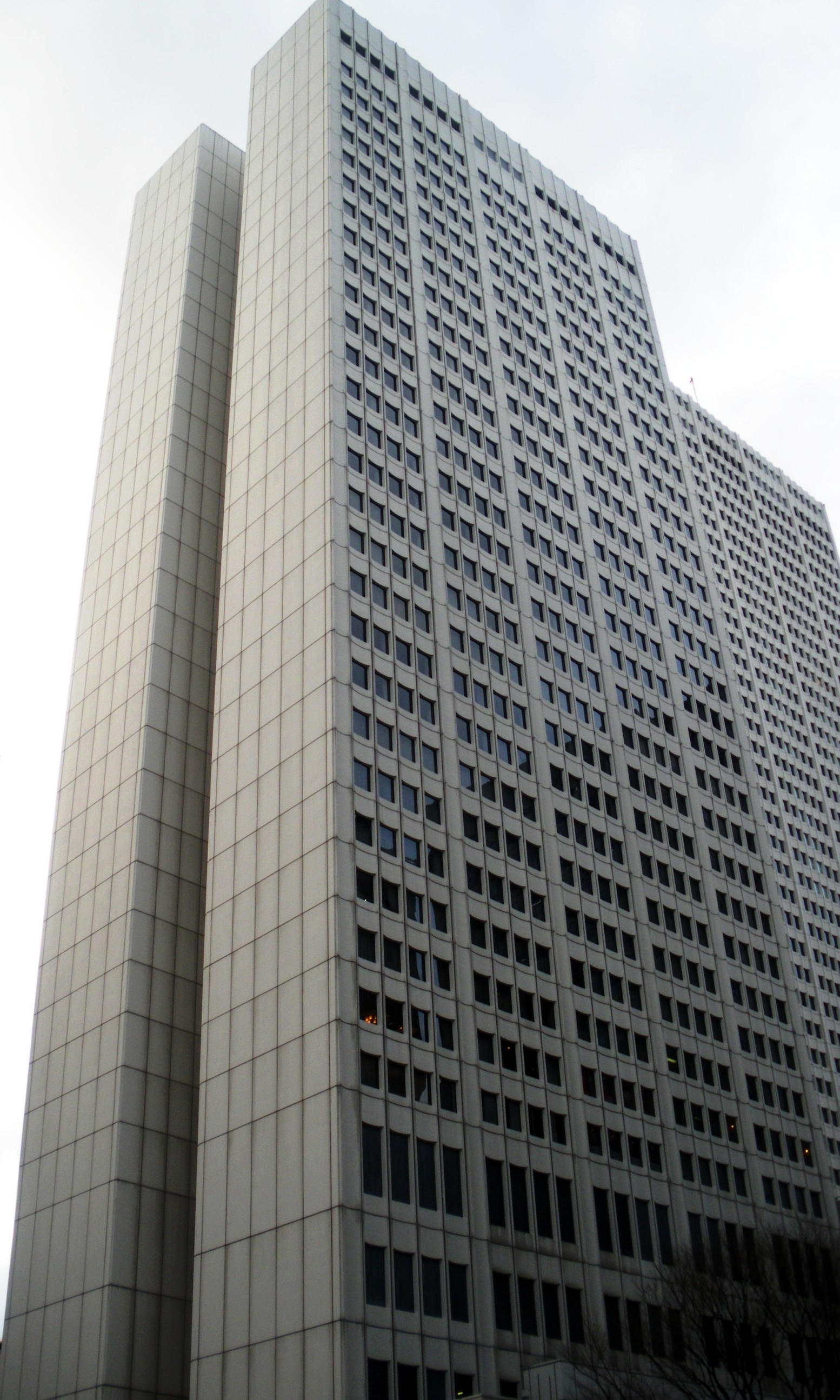
Keio Plaza Hotel, south tower (1980)

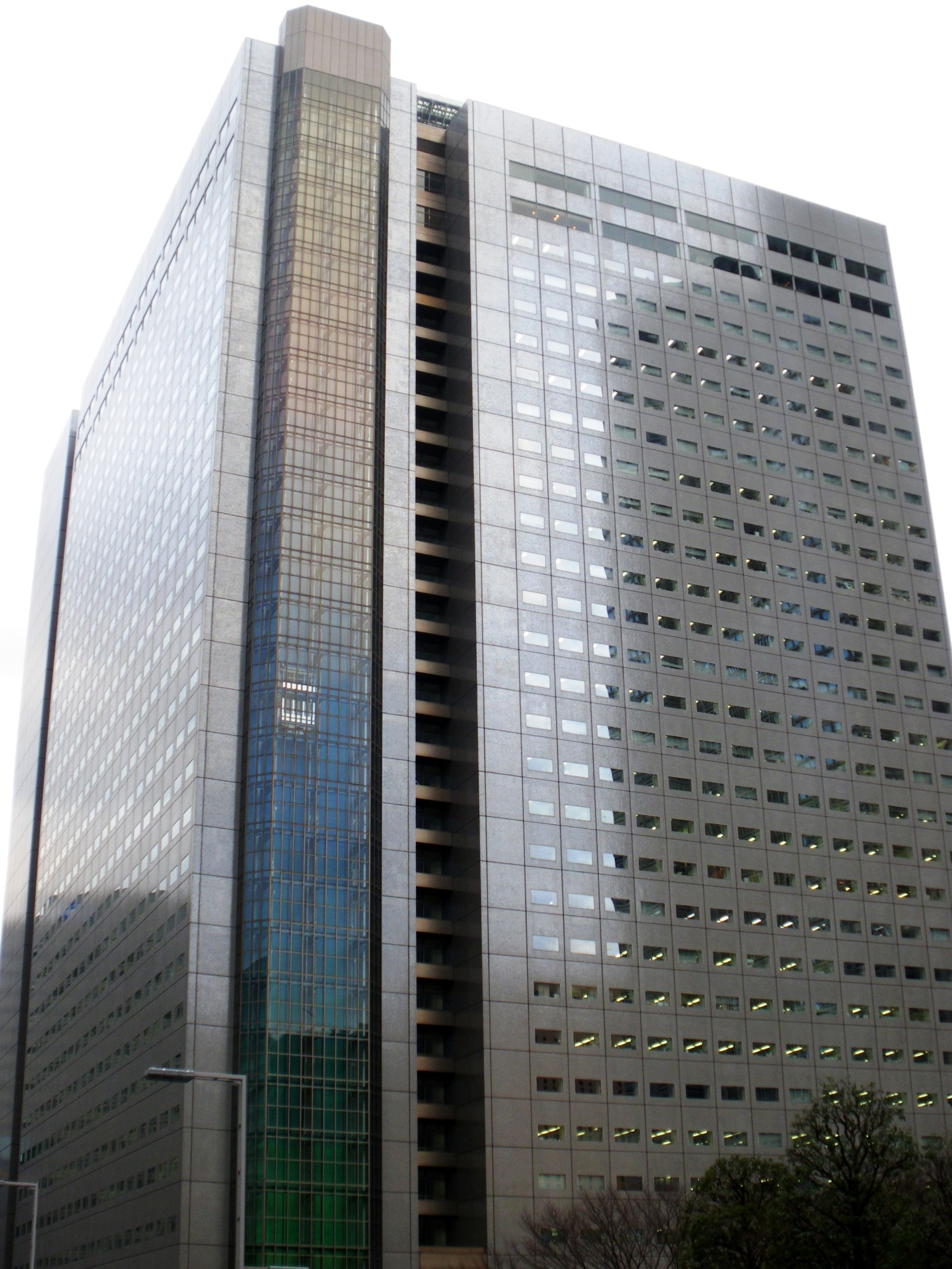
Shinjuku NS Building (1982)

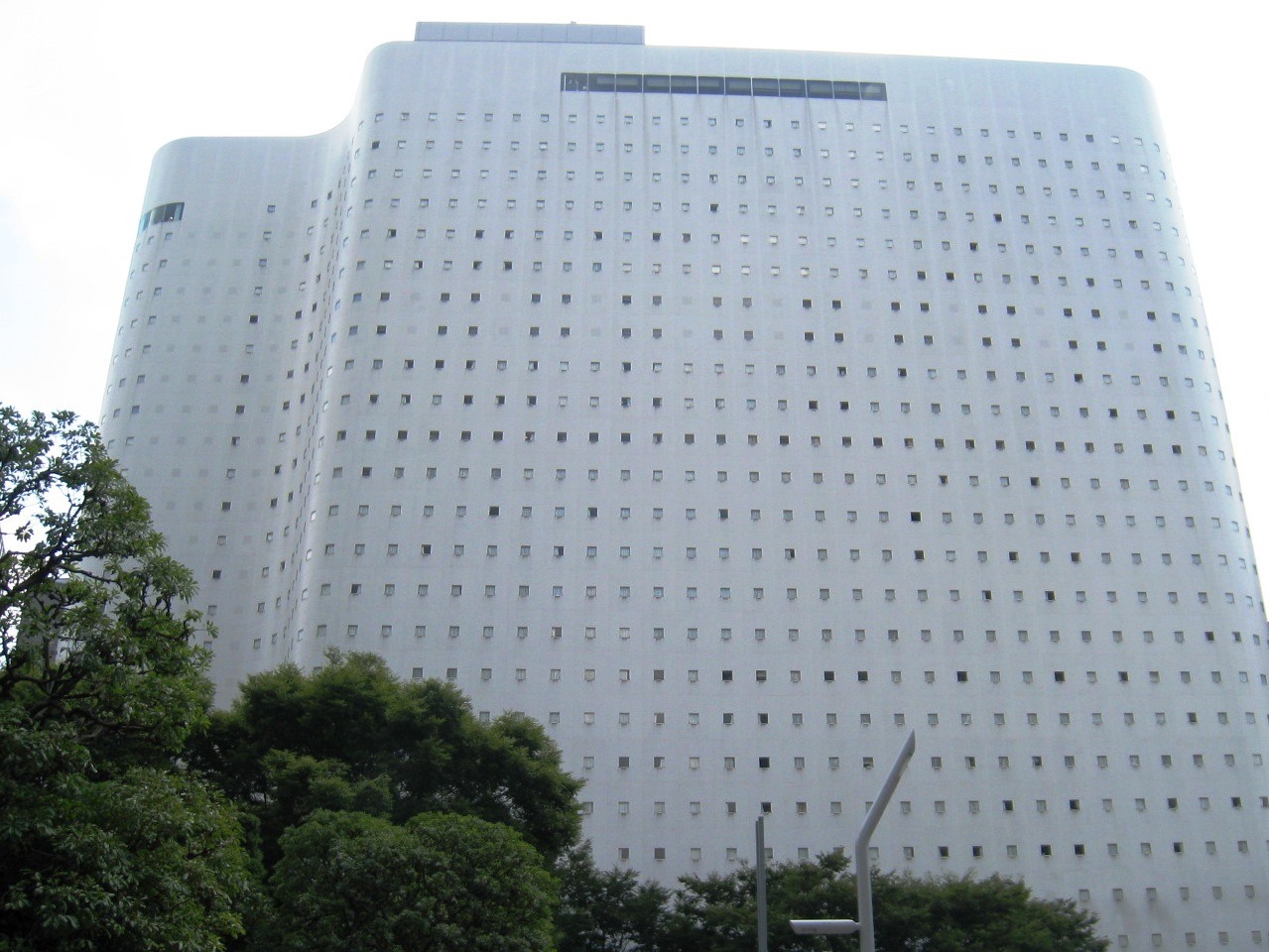
Shinjuku Washington Hotel (1983)

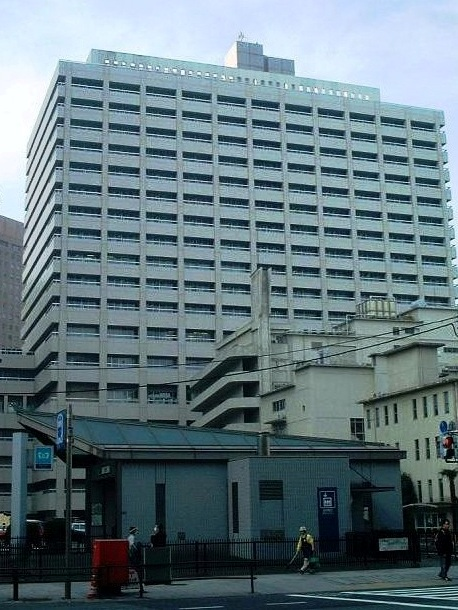
Tokyo Medical University Hospital (1986)

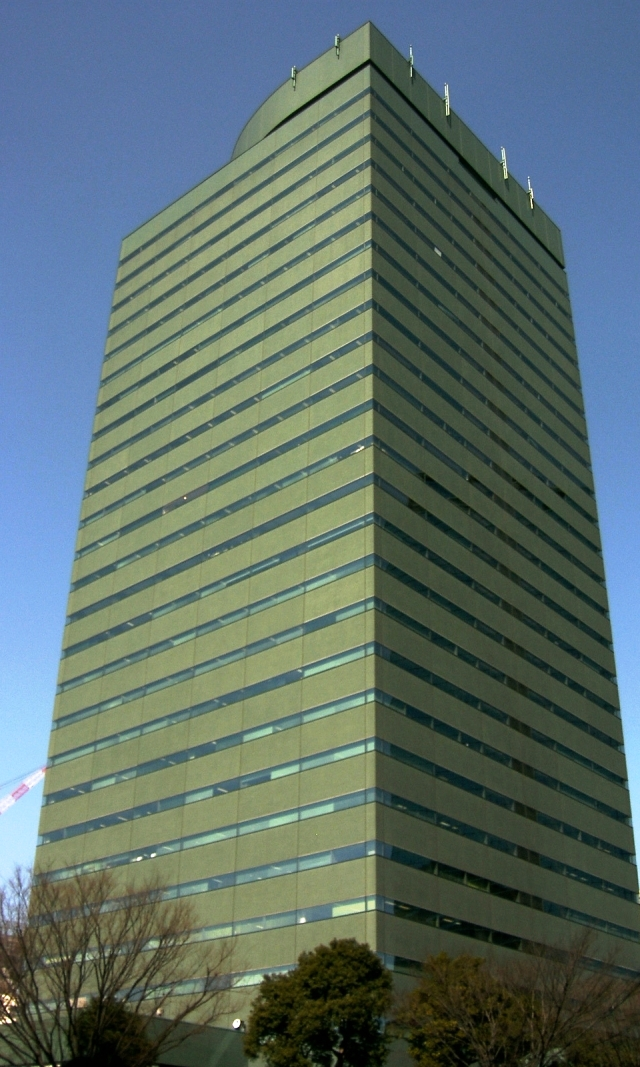
Shinjuku Green Tower (1986)

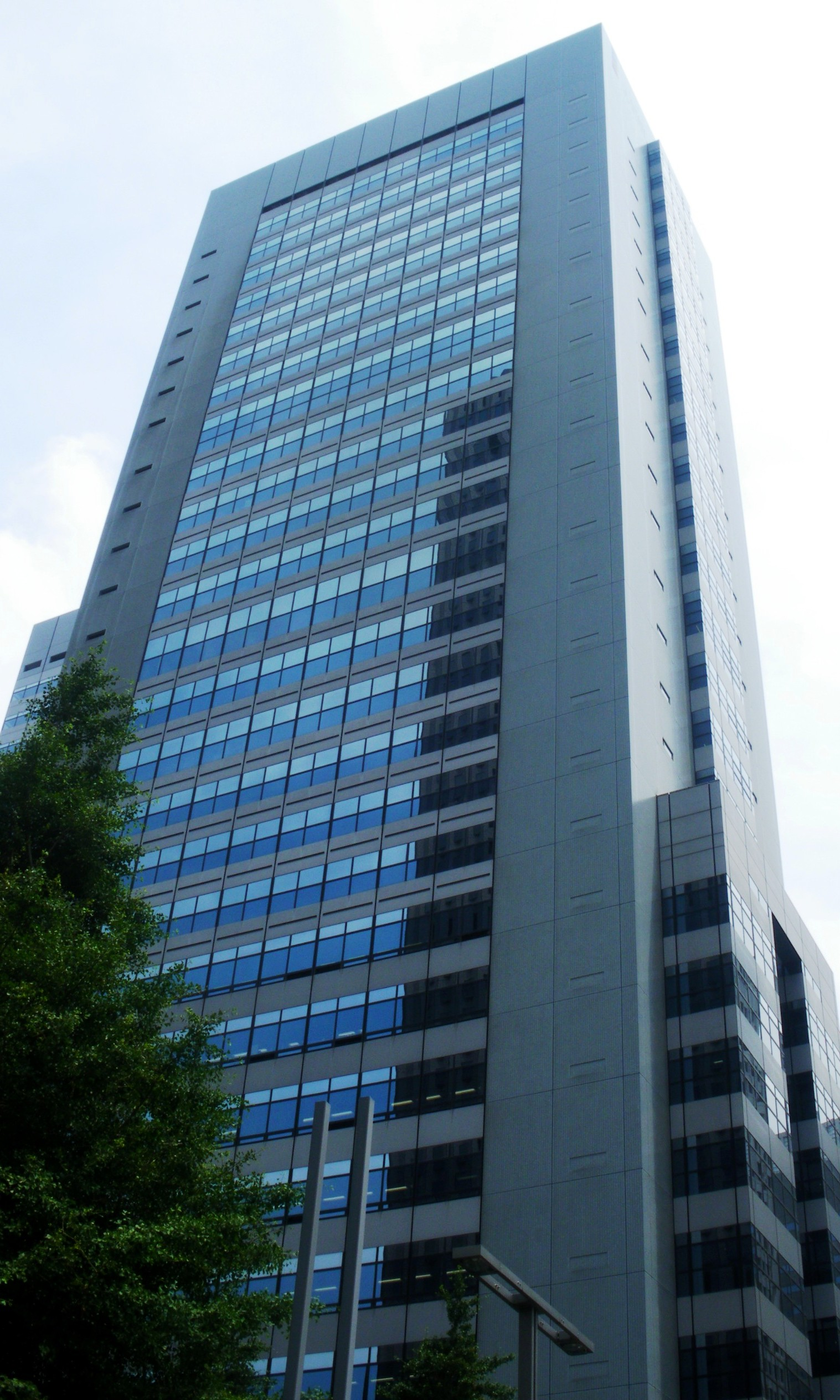
S-Tec Kougakuin University Campus Building (1989)

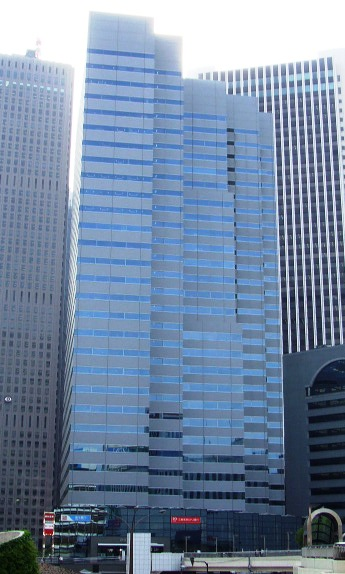
Shinjuku L Tower (1990)

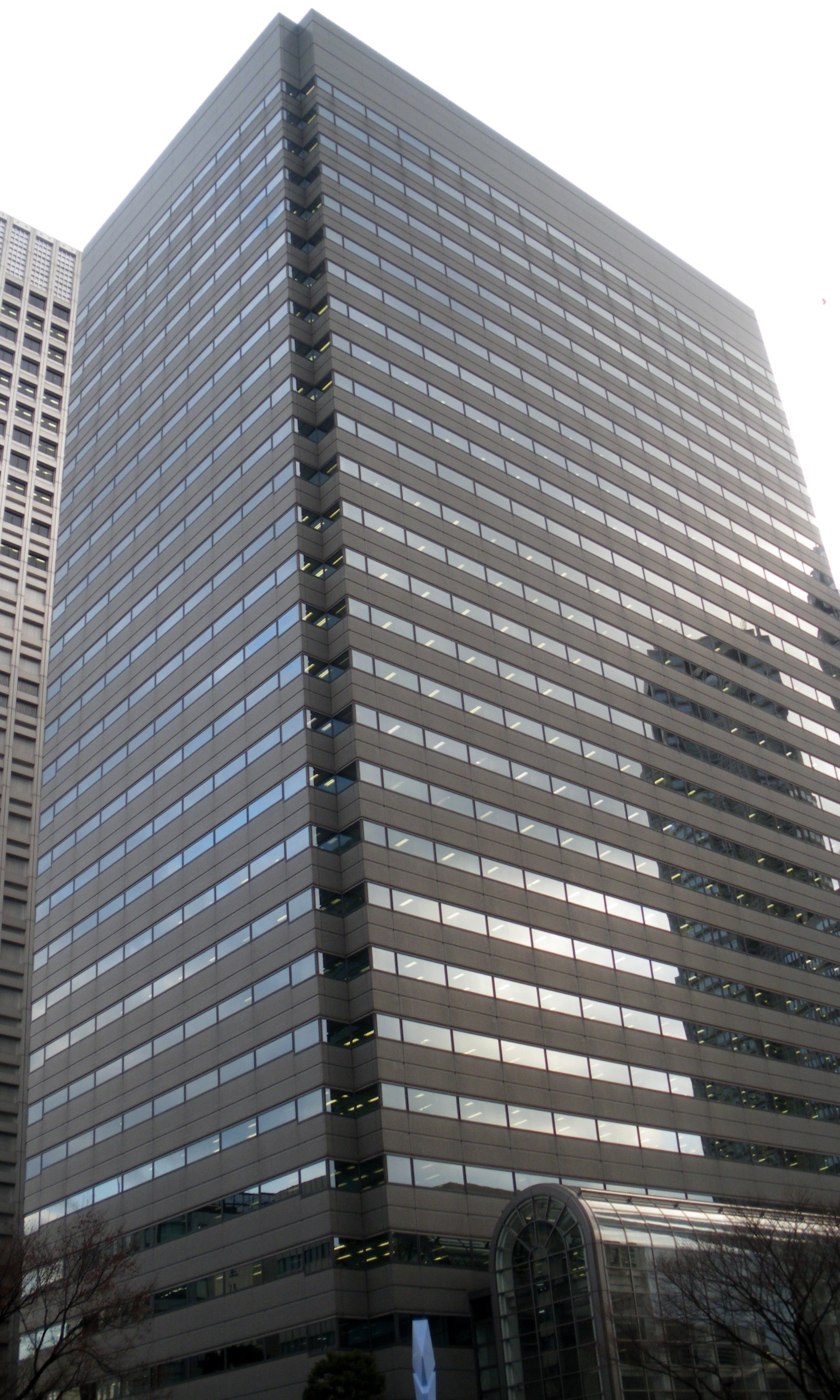
Shinjuku Monolith Building (1990)

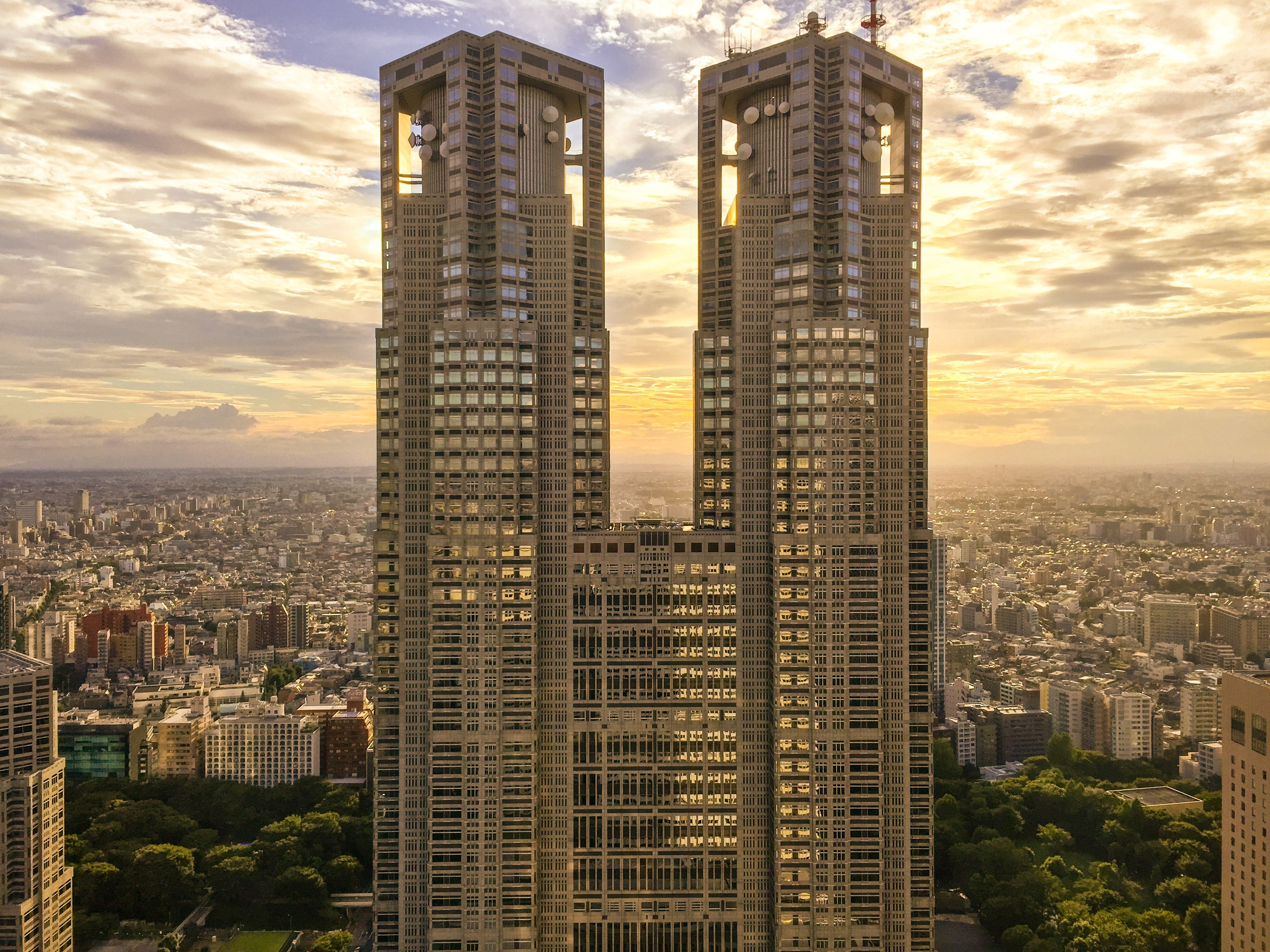
Tokyo Metropolitan Government Building (1991)

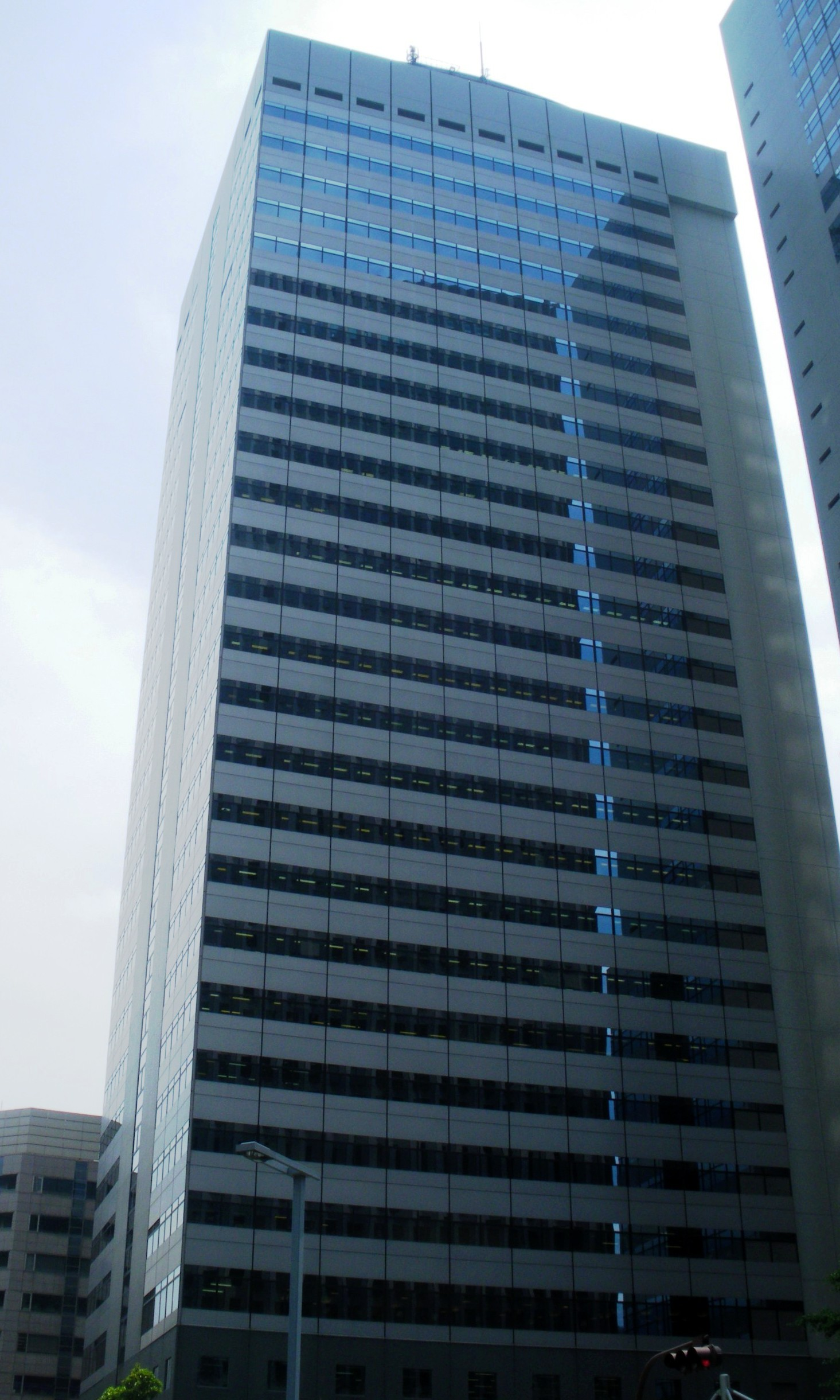
S-Tec Jouhou Building (1992)

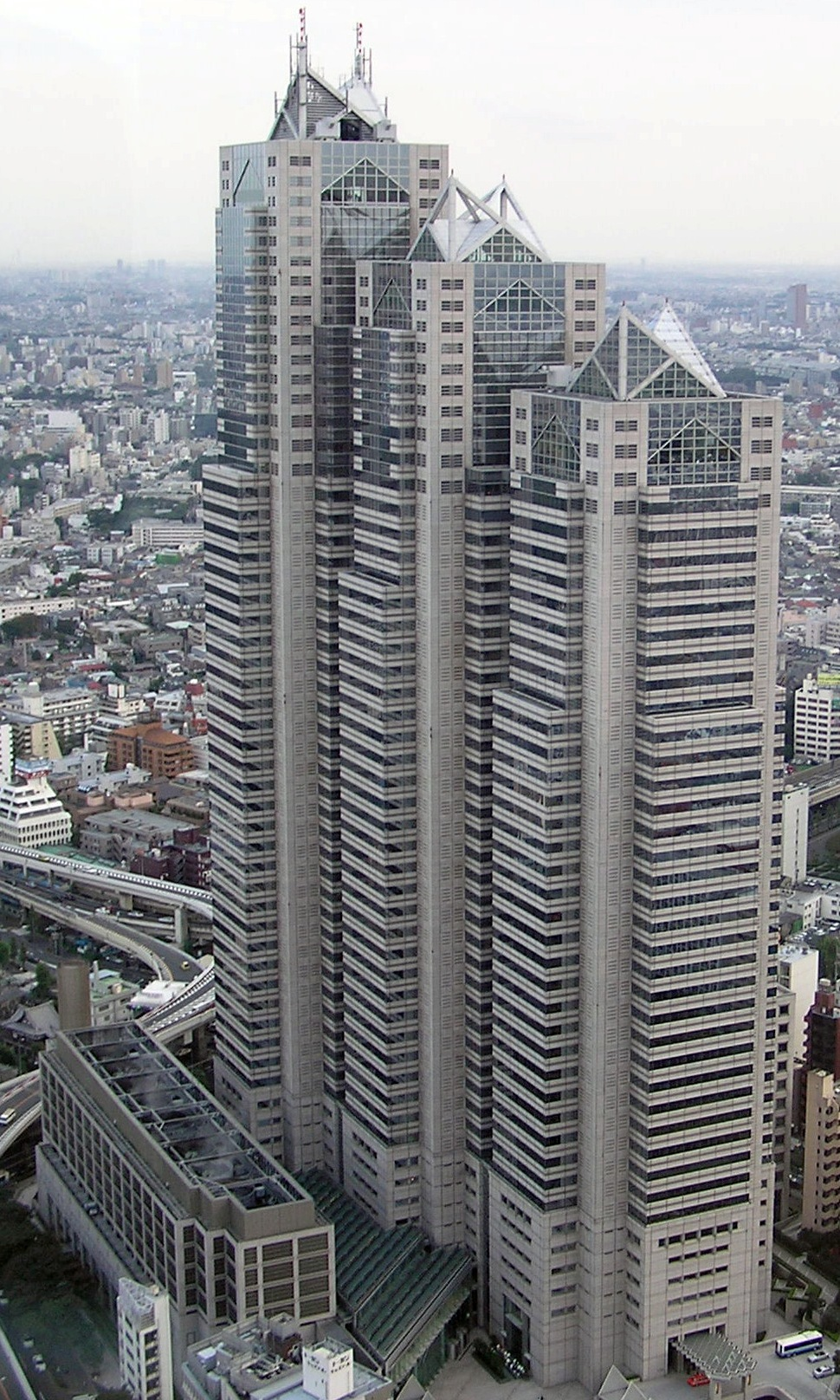
Shinjuku Park Tower (1994)

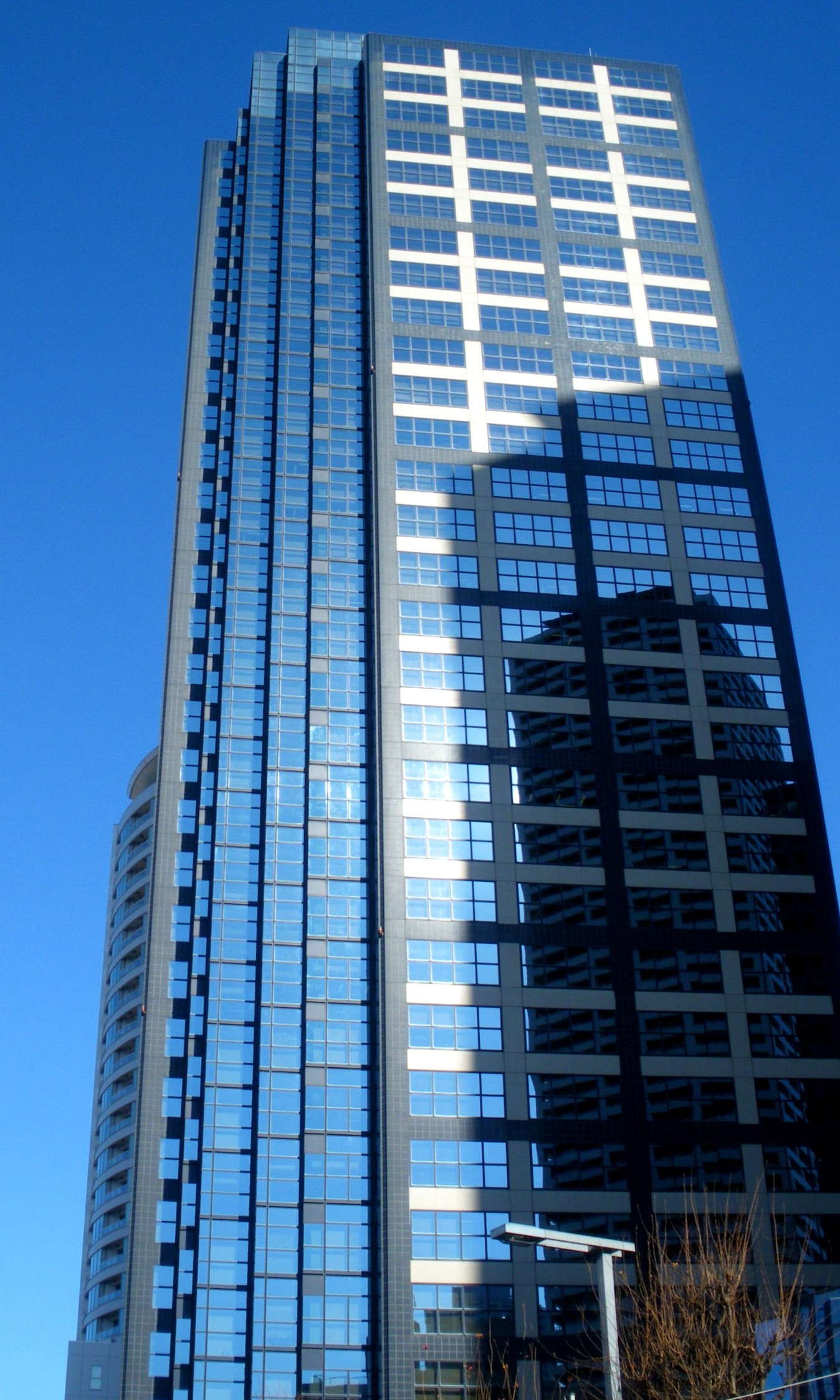
Shinjuku I-town Square (1994)

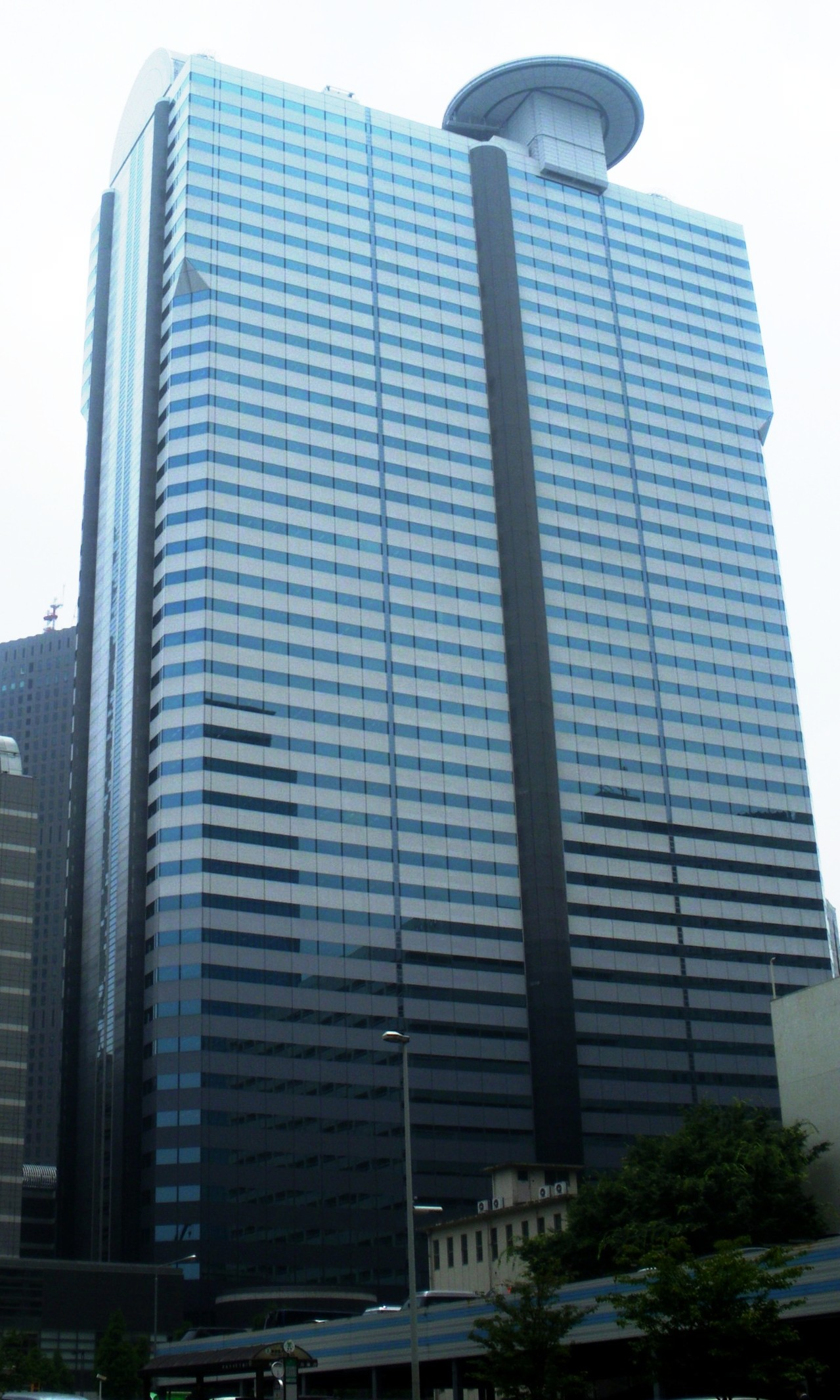
Shinjuku I-land Tower (1994)

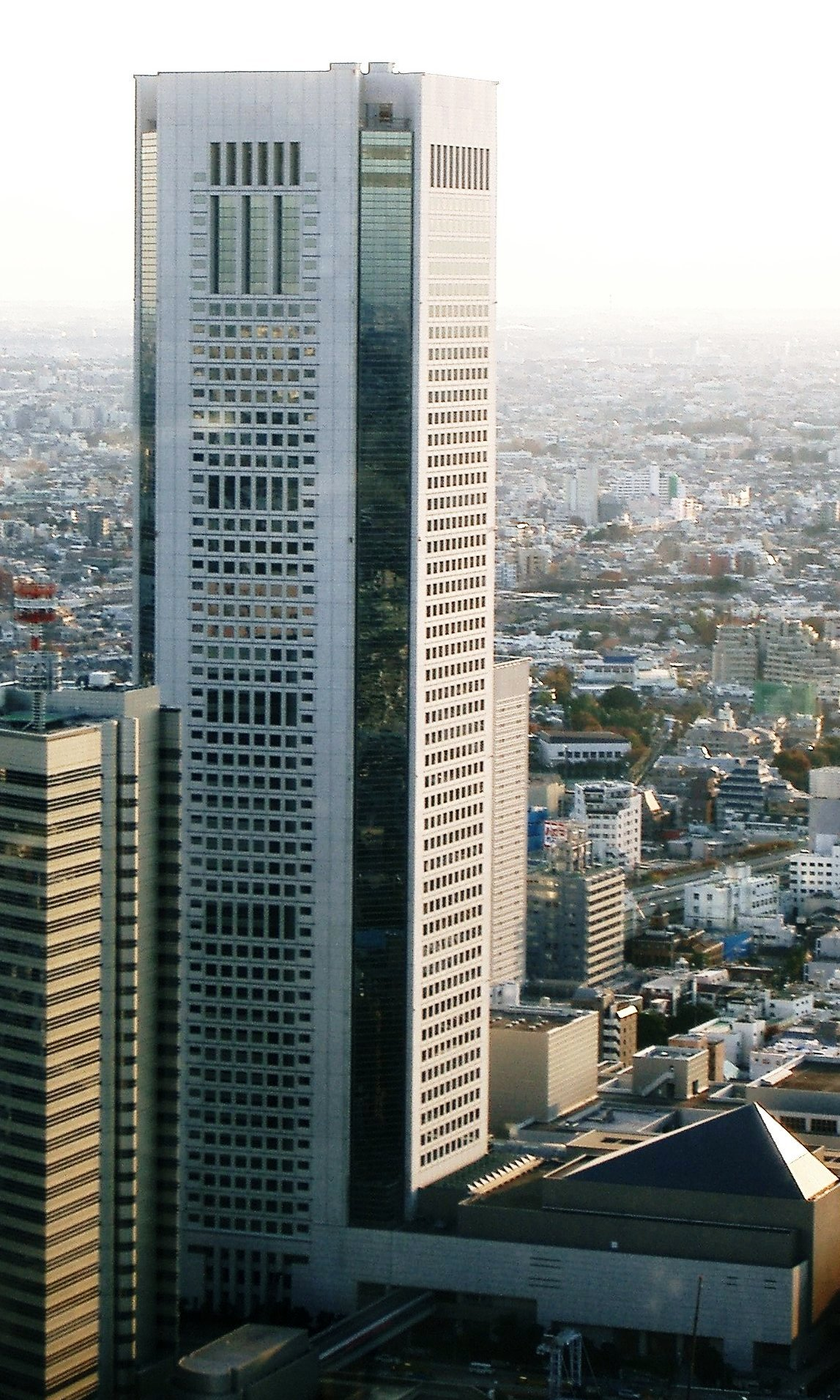
Tokyo Opera City Tower (1996)

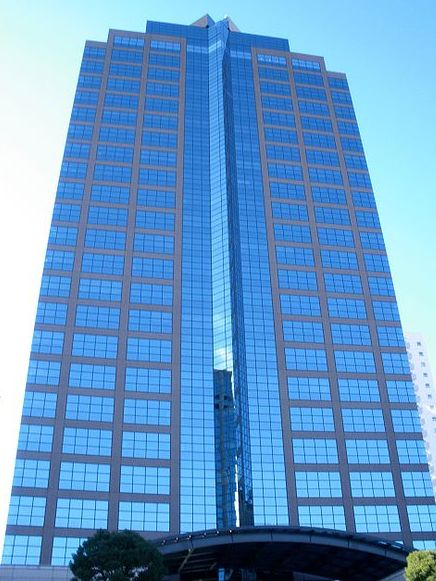
Shinjuku Mitsui Building (1999)

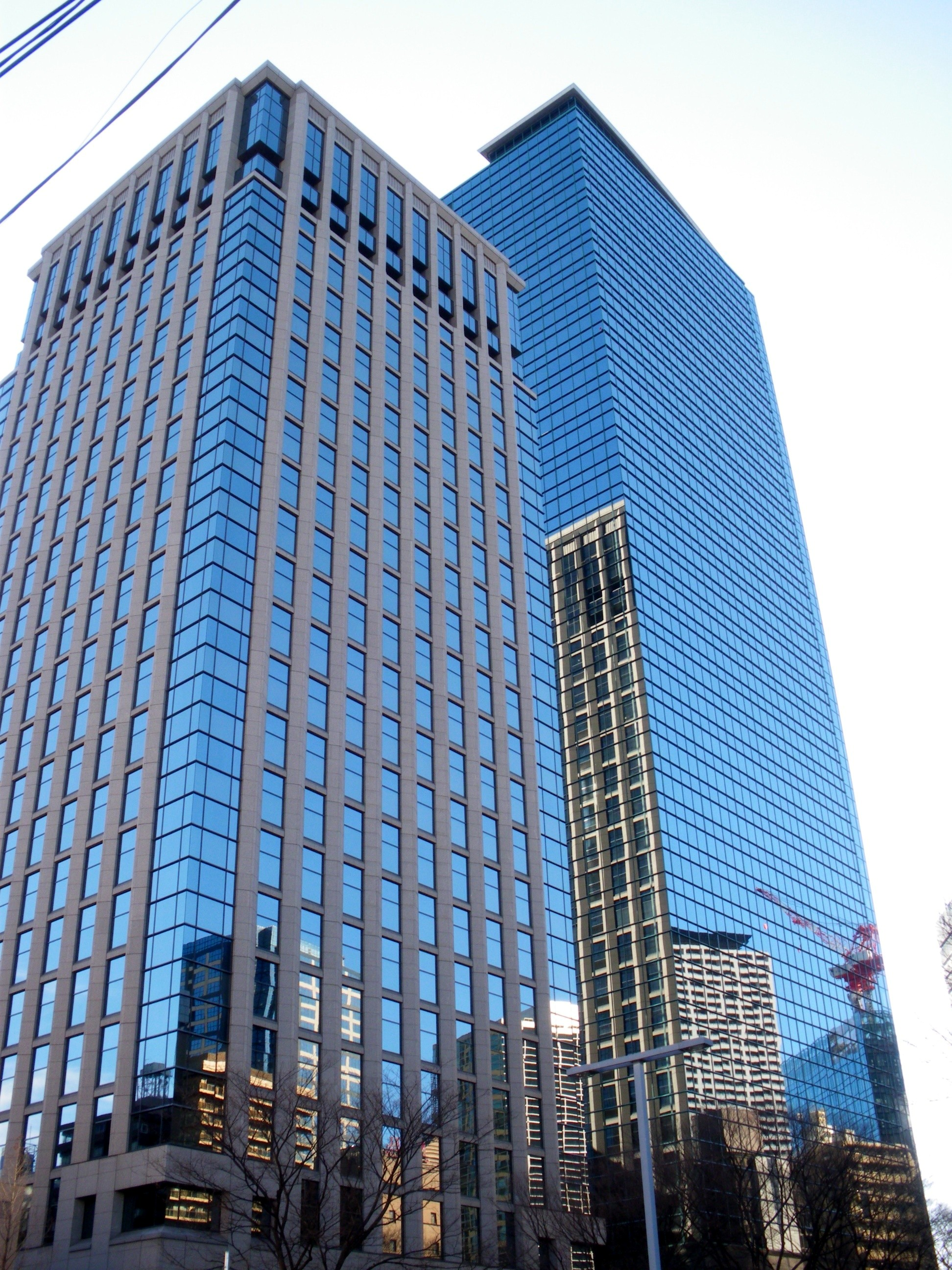
Shinjuku Oak Tower (left: 2002, right: 2003)

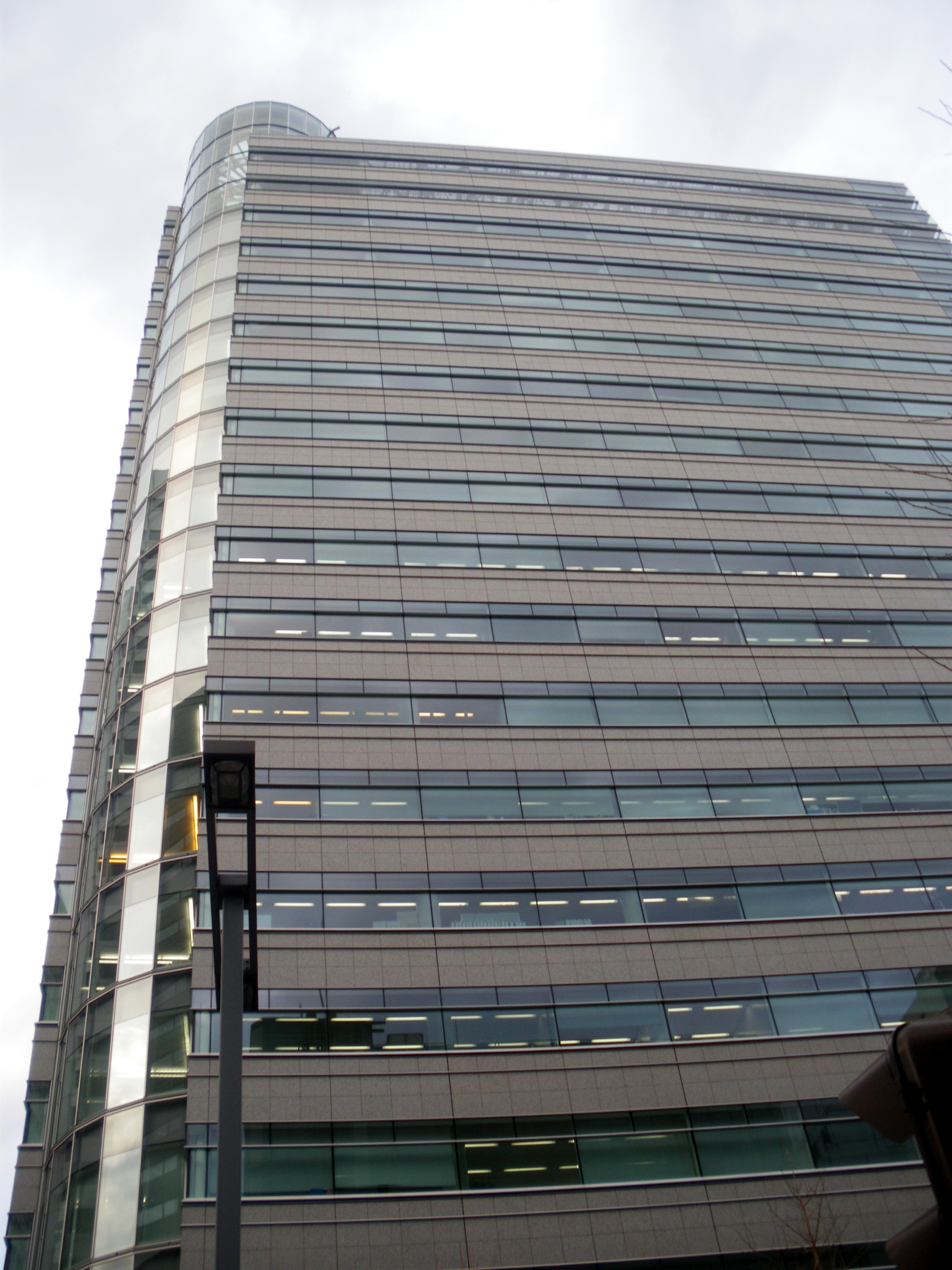
Shinjuku First West (2003)

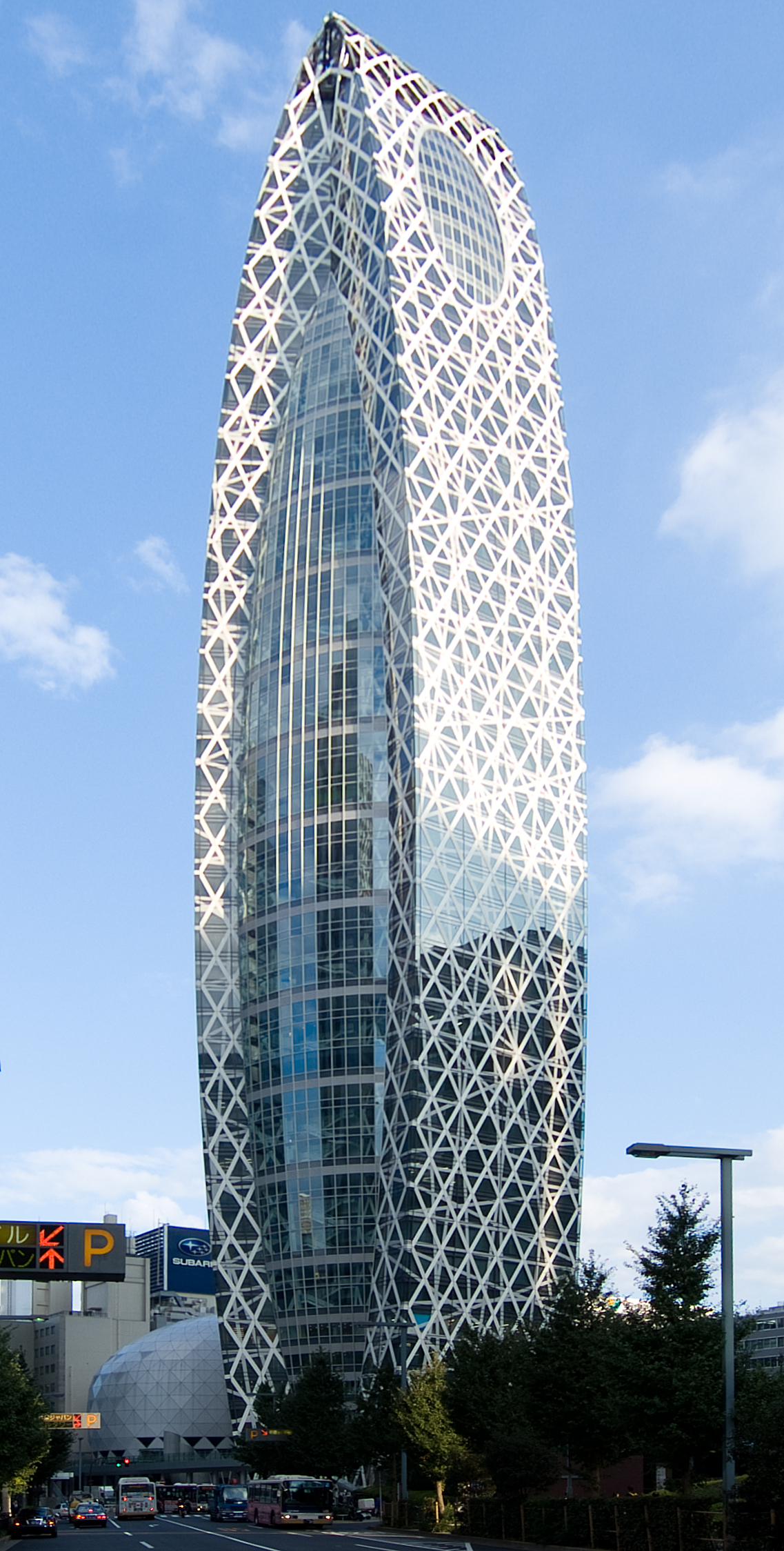
Mode Gakuen Cocoon Tower (2008)
