= Nishi-Shinjuku 3-Chōme Redevelopment =

Building in Nishi-Shinjuku, Tokyo, Japan

Nishi Shinjuku 3 Chome West District Redevelopment
- 西新宿三丁目西地区再開発
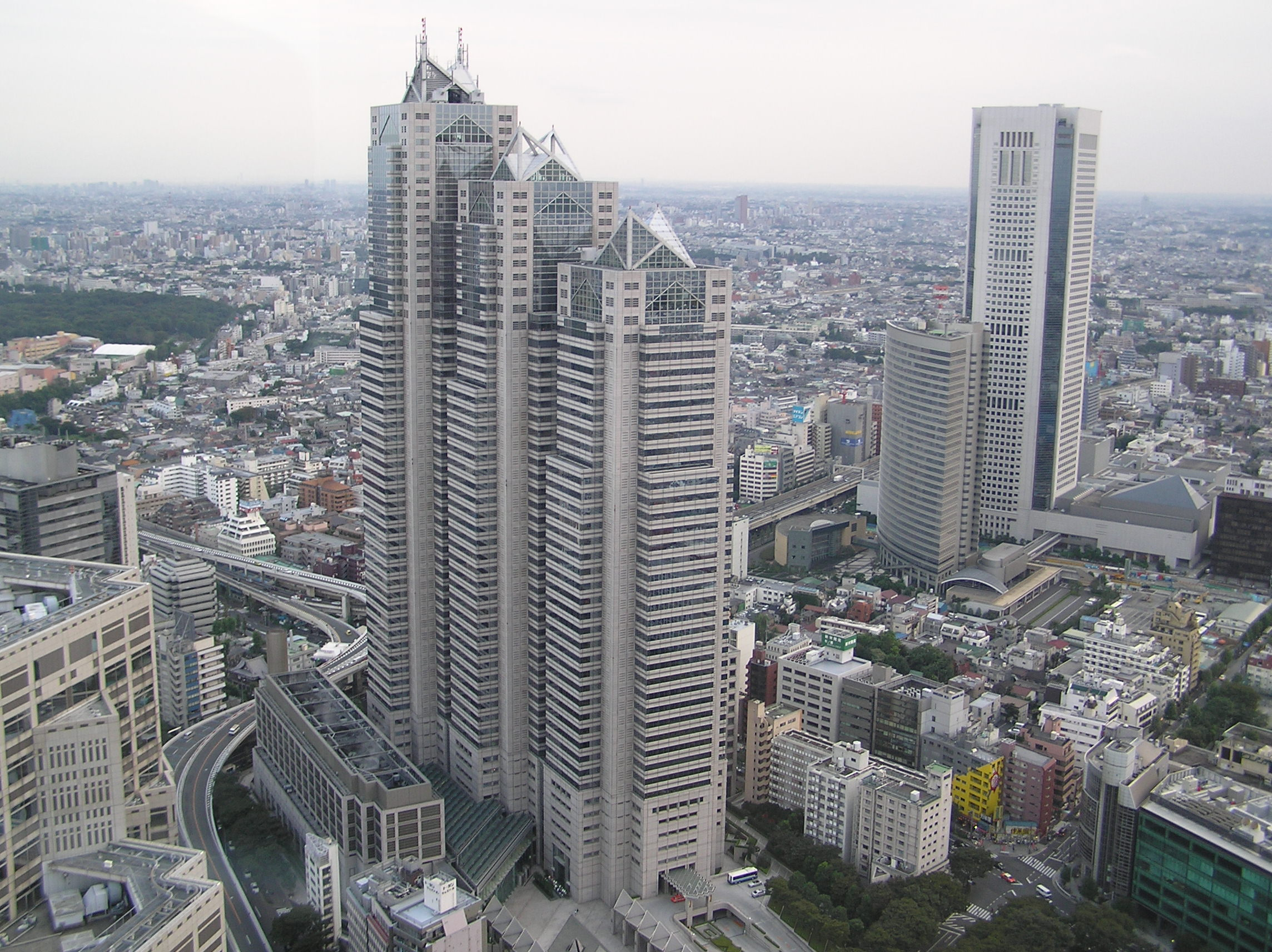
- Proposed redevelopment site (between Shinjuku Park Tower and Tokyo Opera City Tower)

General information
- Status: Proposed
- Type: Residential
- Location: Nishi-Shinjuku, Tokyo; Japan

Height
- Antenna spire: 235 metres (771 ft)

Technical details
- Floor count: 65

The Nishi-Shinjuku 3-Chōme Redevelopment (西新宿三丁目西地区市街地再開発) is a proposed redevelopment project in Nishi-Shinjuku, Tokyo, Japan. The proposal includes 235m tall, 65-storey apartment buildings with a total floor area of 385,000 square metres (4,144,106 sq ft), along with retail on the lower floors. If built they will be the tallest purely residential towers in Japan. As of 2024 the development remains in the planning stage, with its expected completion being in 2029

The original proposal in 1993 included one 77-story, 338 metres (1,109 ft) office tower; two 66-floor, 245 metres (804 ft) residential towers; and one 50 floor, 190 metres (623 ft) residential tower. The 77-story office tower would have been Japan's tallest building, taking the title from the Azabudai Hills Mori JP Tower. This proposal was canceled due to the Great Recession.

== See also ==
- List of tallest buildings in Tokyo
