= Shinjuku Niagara Falls =

Fountain in Shinjuku, Tokyo, Japan

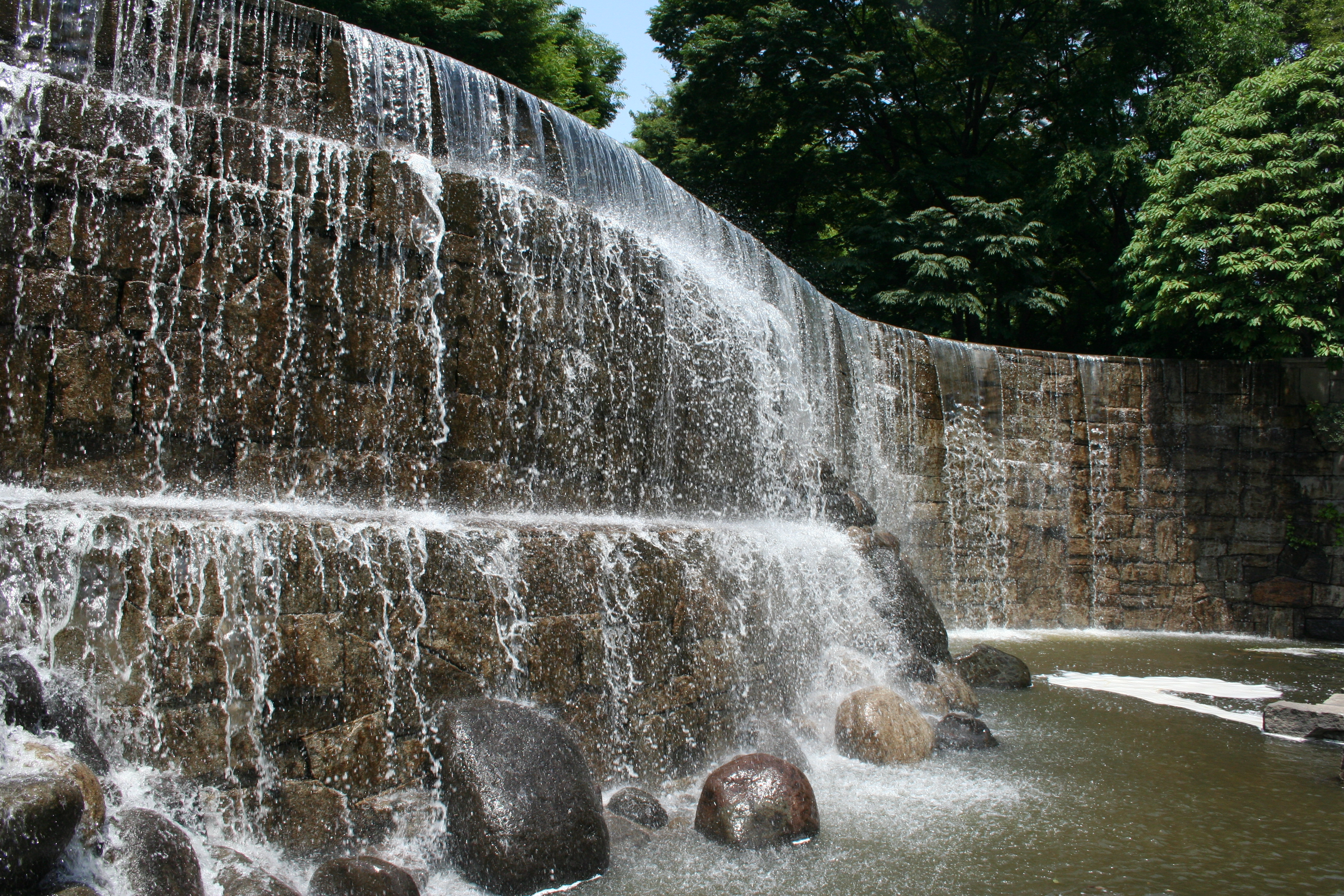
- The fountain in 2008

- Location in Tokyo
- Location: Tokyo, Japan; 35.69009°N 139.68957°E

Shinjuku Niagara Falls is a fountain in Tokyo's Shinjuku Central Park, in Shinjuku, Japan. The Tokyo Weekender has described the water feature as "generously named".

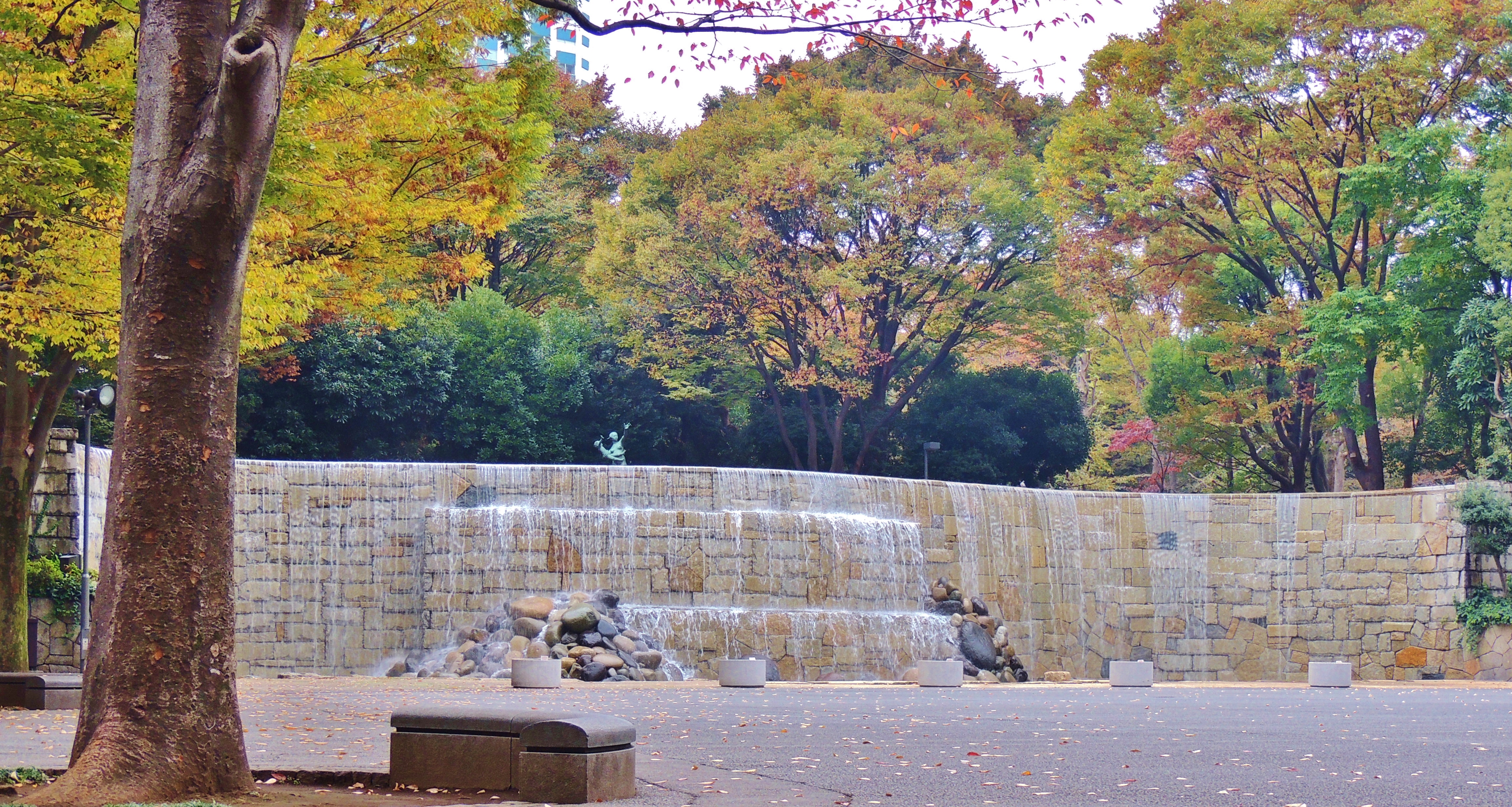
Waterfall, 2014
