= Juniso Kumano Shrine =

Shrine in Shinjuku, Tokyo, Japan

Juniso Kumano Shrine (熊野神社, Juniso Kumano Jinja)
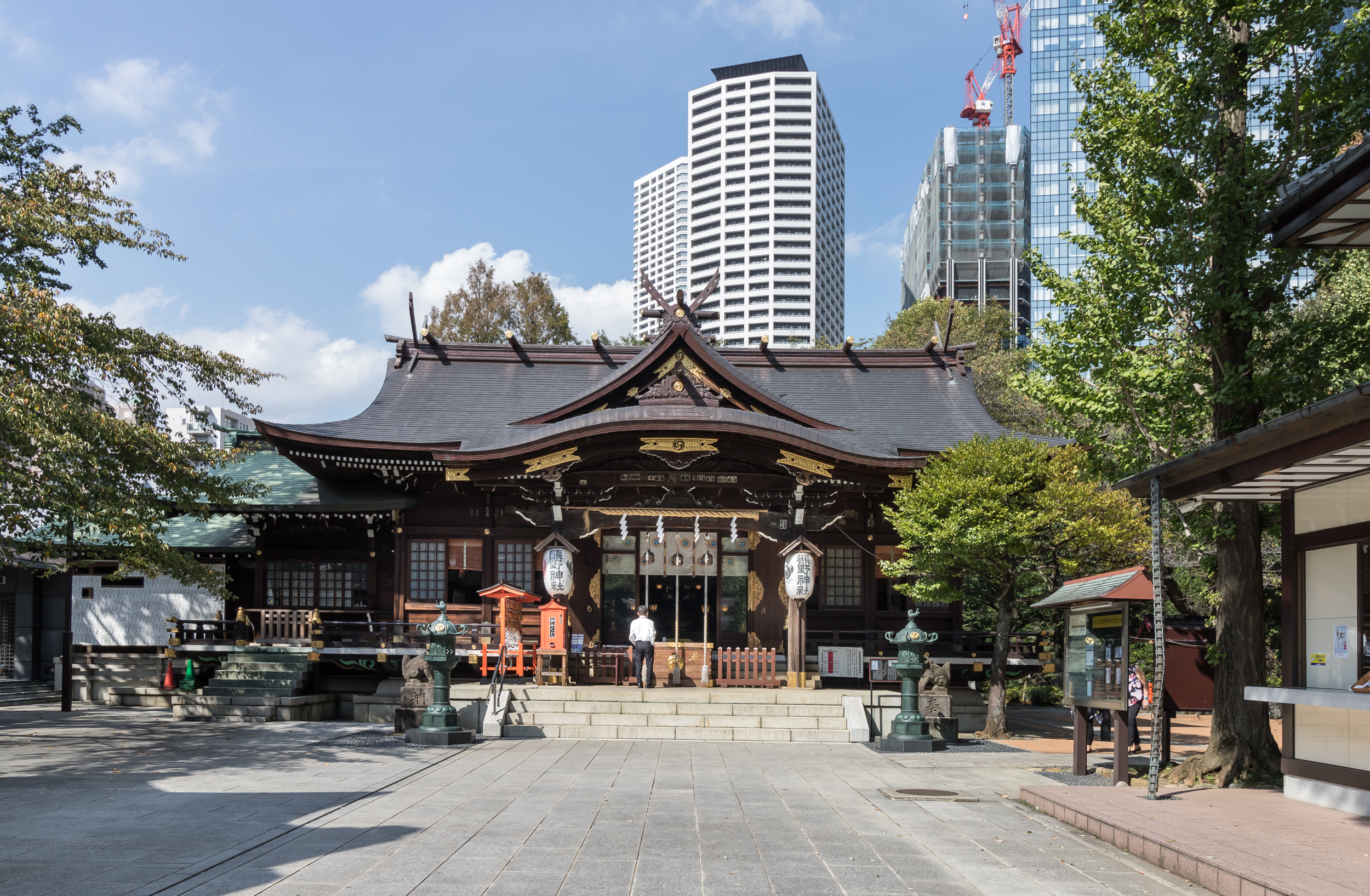
- The shrine in 2018

- Location within Special wards of Tokyo Location within Tokyo

Religion
- Affiliation: Shinto
- Type: Kumano shrine

Location
- Location: Shinjuku, Tokyo
- Interactive map of Juniso Kumano Shrine (熊野神社, Juniso Kumano Jinja)
- Coordinates: 35°41′25.5″N 139°41′17.5″E

Website
- Official website

Juniso Kumano Shrine (Japanese: 熊野神社) is a Kumano shrine in Nishi-Shinjuku (west Shinjuku), Tokyo, Japan, on the western side of Shinjuku Central Park.
