= Shinjuku Central Park =

Park in Tokyo, Japan

Coordinates: 35.69007°N 139.68947°E

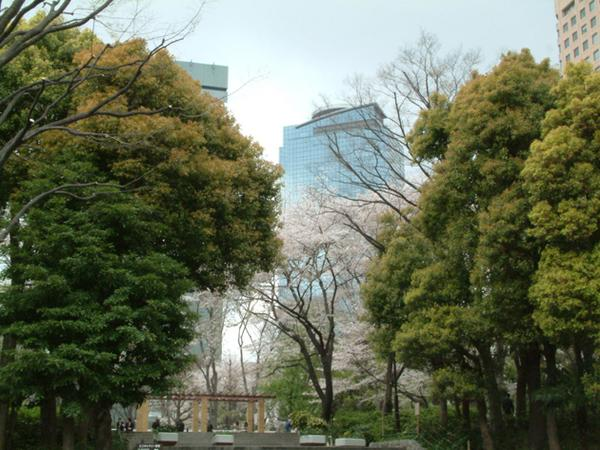
- Shinjuku Central Park
- Interactive map of Shinjuku Central Park
- Location: Shinjuku, Tokyo, Japan

Shinjuku Central Park or Shinjuku Chūō Park (新宿中央公園, Shinjuku chūō kōen) is a park in western Shinjuku, Tokyo, Japan. The park is bordered by Honnnan Dori and Kita Dori to the north, Junisha Dori to the west, Suido Dori or Minami Dori to the south, and Koen Dori to the east. The park is located directly in front of the Tokyo Metropolitan Government Building, and is surrounded by some of Tokyo's tallest buildings including the Hyatt Regency Tokyo, the Park Hyatt, and other hotels and office buildings.

The park is accessible for the many office workers in the area and an ideal place for them to spend their lunch time. You can also see the belongings of homeless people carefully wrapped up in blue plastic ready to be unpacked at night time.

Shinjuku Central Park is different from Shinjuku Gyo-en, located on the south-eastern side of Shinjuku Station. Right next to the park is Tochomae Station, which is served by the Toei Ōedo Line. Juniso Kumano Shrine is on the western side of the park.

== Features ==
The park is divided into three areas: north, west, and east by roads.

=== North ===
- SHUKNOVA - A facility operated under the Park-PFI system, which includes a Starbucks store among others.
- Lawn Plaza - Home to the "Bell of Peace."
- Sports Corner - Includes facilities such as a rebound tennis court.
- Eco Gallery Shinjuku
- Forest with a View
- Shinjuku Shiraito Falls
- Shinjuku Niagara Falls
- Water Plaza
- Biotope - Located on the south side of Kumano Shrine. Open only on specific dates and times.
- Monument to the Birthplace of the Photographic Industry
- Administrative Office
- Citizen’s Forest
- Lunch Corner - Equipped with tables and chairs; available for use during the daytime only.
- Fujimidai (Mt. Fuji Viewing Hill) - At the summit stands a hexagonal pavilion (a Western-style gazebo from the former Yodobashi Water Purification Plant).

==== West Area ====
- Splash Pond (Jabu-Jabu Ike) - Only usable during summer
- Kids' Plaza - A playground for children.
- Futsal Management Building

==== East Area ====
- Futsal Court
- Basketball Hoop
