= Shinjuku Park Tower =

Skyscraper located in Tokyo

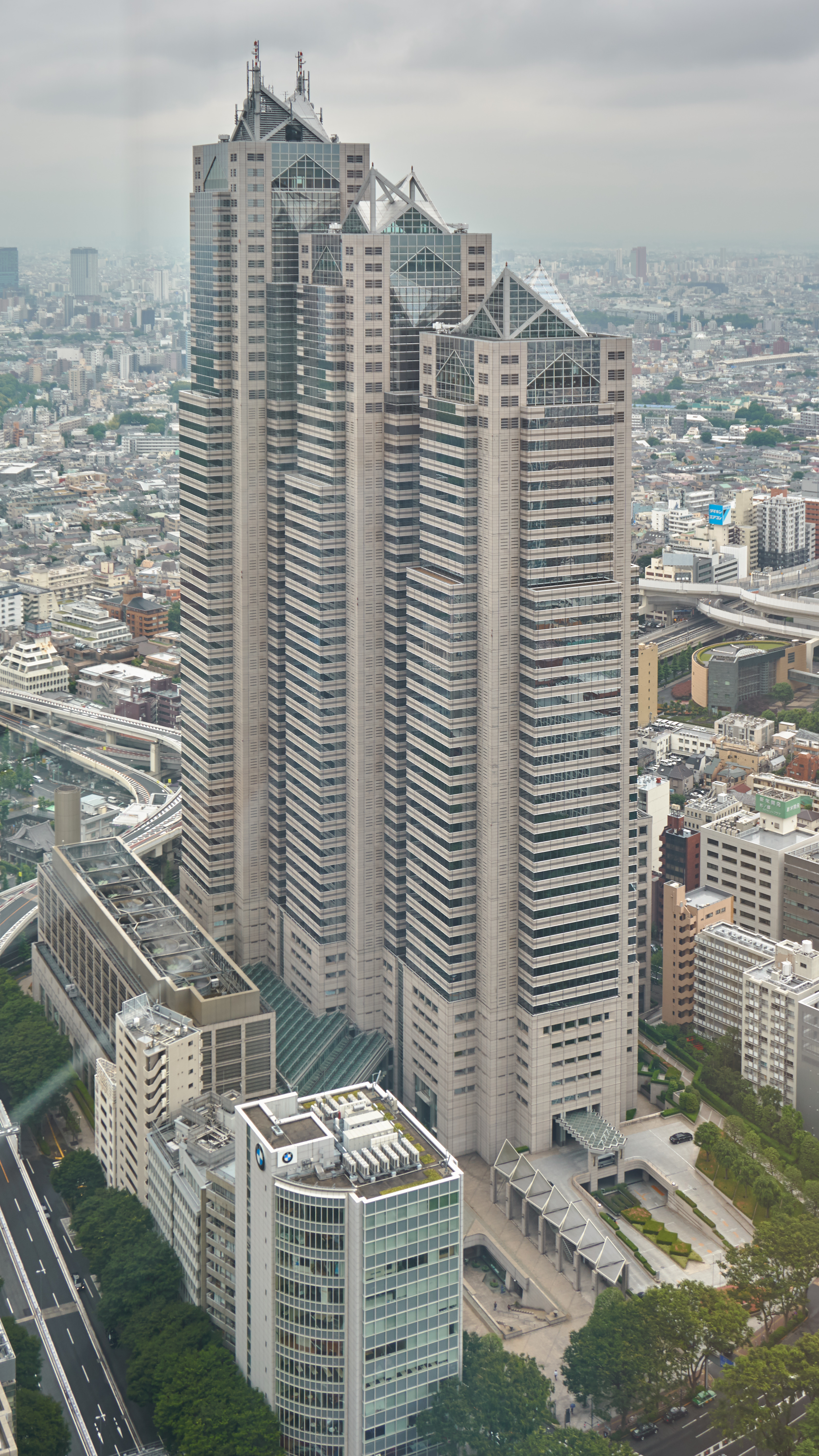
- Shinjuku Park Tower as seen from Tokyo Metropolitan Government Building

General information
- Status: Completed
- Location: 3-7-1 Nishi-Shinjuku; Shinjuku, Tokyo, Japan
- Coordinates: 35.68564°N 139.69095°E
- Opening: April 25, 1994

Height
- Roof: 235 m (771 ft)

Technical details
- Floor count: 52
- Floor area: 264,141 m^{2} (2,843,190 sq ft)

Design and construction
- Architect: Kenzo Tange
- Structural engineer: Kajima Corporation; Shimizu Corporation; Taisei Corporation

The Shinjuku Park Tower (新宿パークタワー, Shinjuku Pāku Tawā) is the second-tallest building in Shinjuku, Tokyo.

== History ==
It was designed by Kenzo Tange and completed in 1994.

The building is owned and managed by Tokyo Gas Urban Development, a subsidiary of Tokyo Gas, and was constructed on the site of a decommissioned gas storage facility. Tokyo Gas operates a regional cooling center on-site, which provides heating and cooling to the high-rise district of Nishi-Shinjuku, and supplies electricity to the adjacent Tokyo Metropolitan Government Building.

The hotel featured prominently in Academy Award-winning film Lost in Translation.

== Architecture ==
Shinjuku Park Tower is a single building consisting of three connected block-shaped elements; S tower, which is 235 m (771 ft) tall with 52 stories, C tower which is 209 m (686 ft) tall with 47 stories and N tower which is 182 m (597 ft) tall with 41 stories. Floors 1 to 8 are occupied by retail stores, floors 9 to 37 are office floors and floors 39 to 52 are occupied by the luxury Park Hyatt Tokyo hotel, which includes a swimming pool with panoramic views on the city.

== Floor directory ==
39F-52F (39th–52nd floors)	41F (41st floor)	9F-37F (9th–37th floors)
Park Hyatt Tokyo	Check-in lobby	Office floors
19F (19th floor)	11F (11th floor)	8F (8th floor)
Taisei Housing Park	Shinjuku Park Tower Dental Clinic; Mareesia Garden Clinic	NHK Garden
3F-7F (3rd–7th floors)	3F-4F (3rd–4th floors)	3F (3rd floor)
Living Design Center Ozone	The Conran Shop Shinjuku	Park Tower Hall
1F (1st floor)	B1F (Basement floor)	B2F-B5F (2nd–5th Basement floors)
Lobby, Gallery, Atrium	Shops & Restaurants	Parking

== Tenants ==
- L'Oreal
- Tokyo Gas

== In media ==
- The Park Hyatt Tokyo hotel on the top was the main setting of the Sofia Coppola film Lost In Translation.
- The building was depicted as being destroyed by a UFO in the film Godzilla 2000.
- A version of the building was included as part of the Asian tileset in the city building simulation game Sim City 3000 and named as Futa-Ishii Plaza.

== Images ==
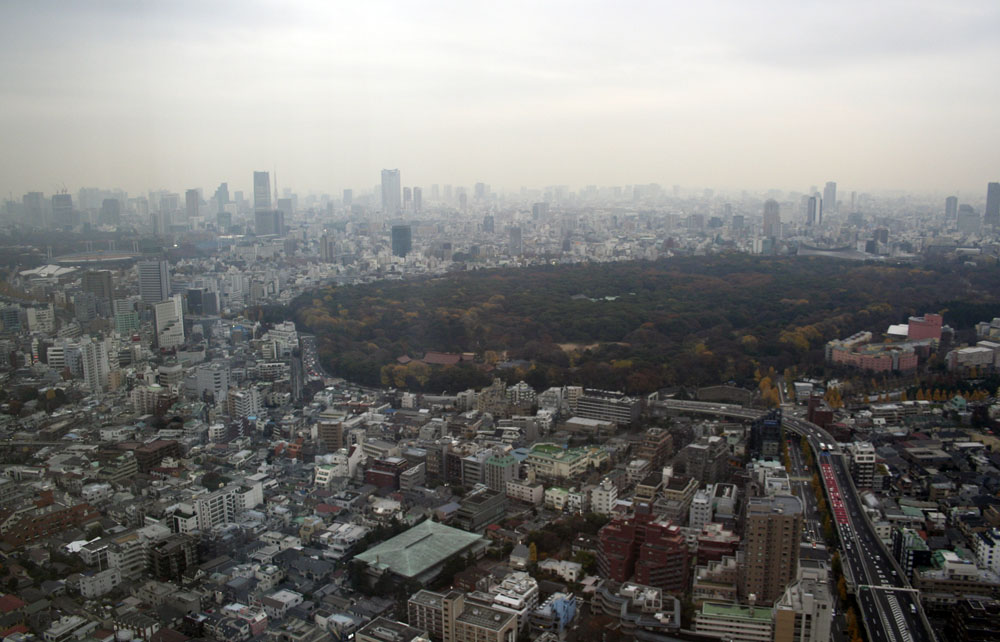
View from the 47th floor of the Park Hyatt Tokyo

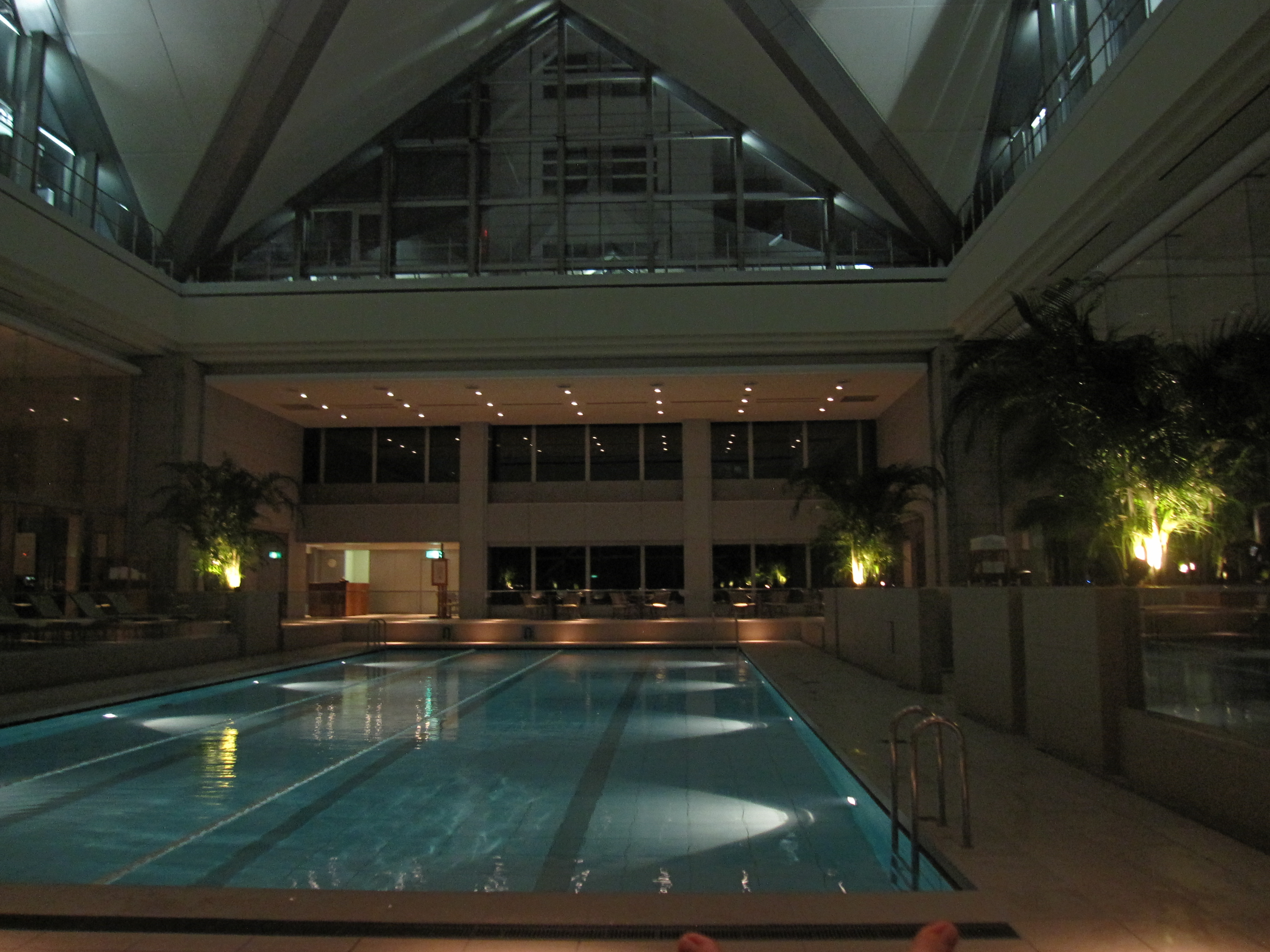
Swimming pool of the Park Hyatt

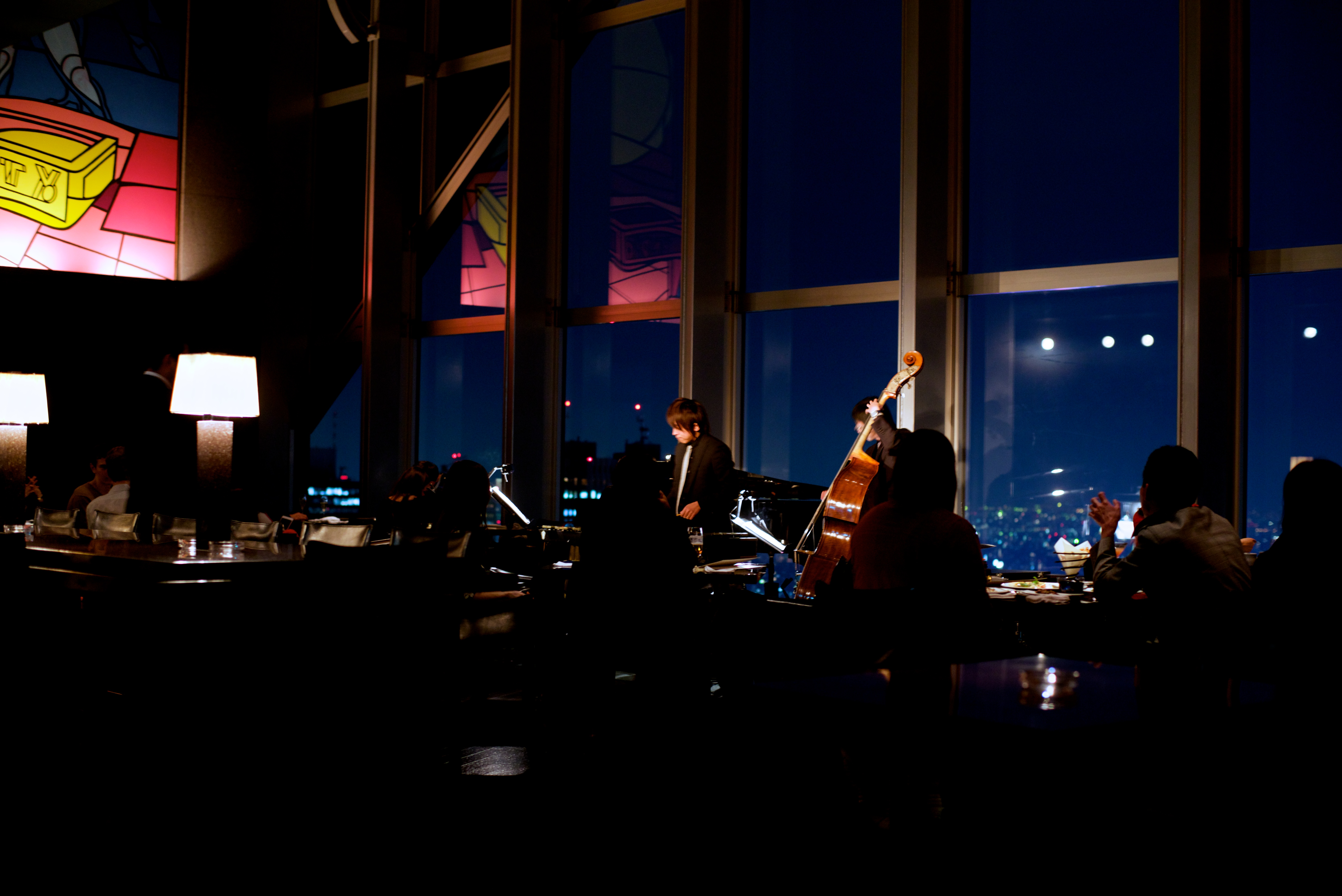
Bar of the Park Hyatt

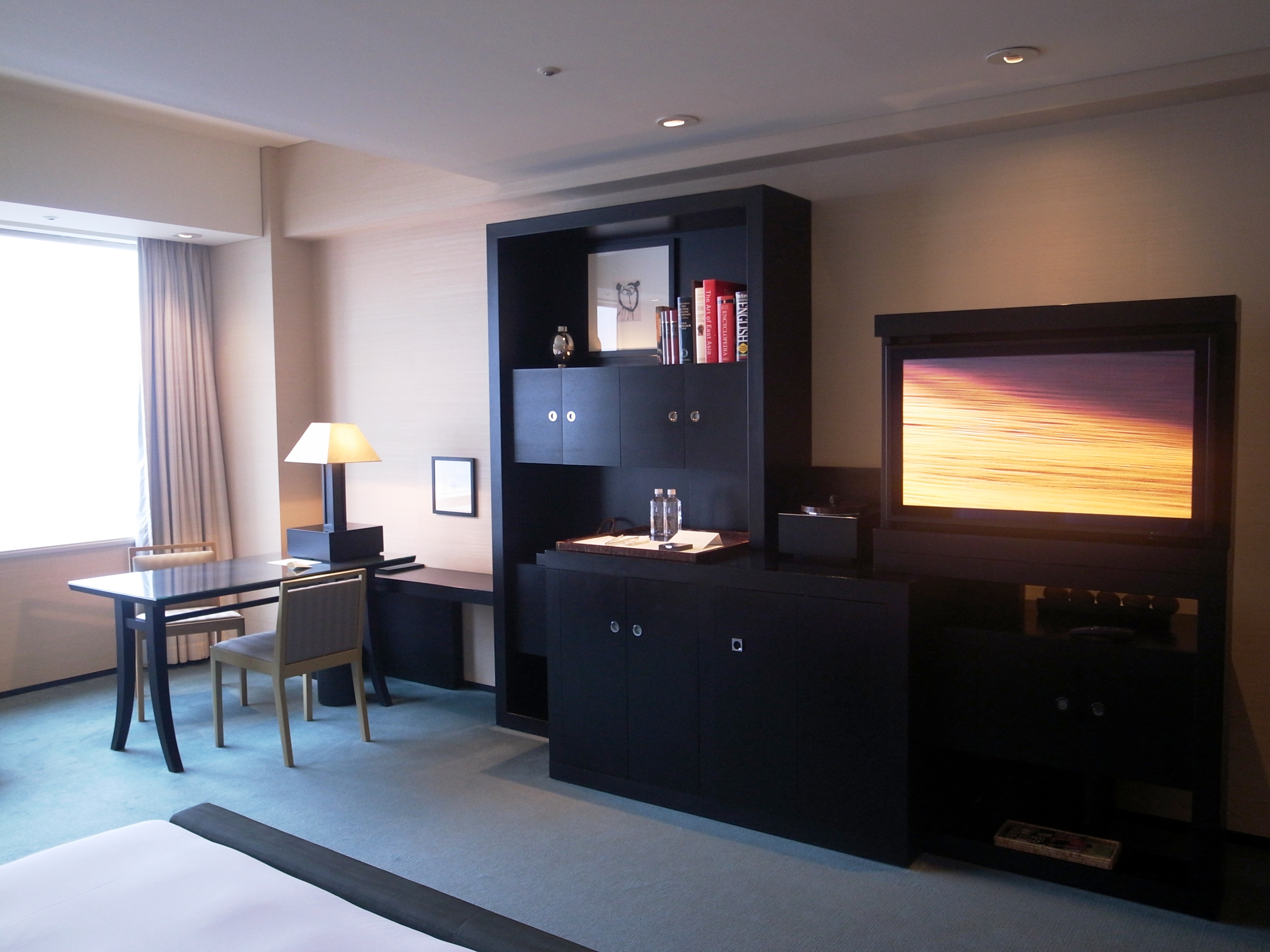
Hotel guest room

== See also ==
- List of tallest structures in Tokyo
