= Shinjuku L Tower =

Skyscraper in Shinjuku, Tokyo, Japan

Coordinates: 35°41′34″N 139°41′43″E

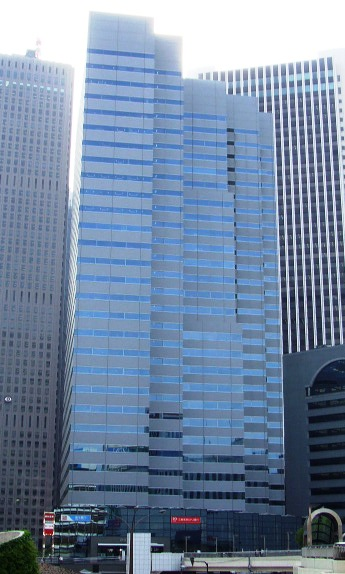
Shinjuku I-Land Tower

The Shinjuku L Tower (新宿エルタワー) is a skyscraper located in Shinjuku, Tokyo, Japan. Construction of the 121-metre (397 ft), 31-storey skyscraper was finished in 1989. It was built by the Japanese construction firm, Shimizu Construction Company.
