= Nikkei CNBC =

Japanese business news TV channel

Nikkei CNBC 日経CNBC
- Country: Japan
- Broadcast area: Nationwide
- Network: CNBC

Programming
- Language: Japanese
- Picture format: HDTV 1080i

Ownership
- Owner: Nikkei CNBC Japan, Inc. (Nikkei, Inc. and TV Tokyo, Versant, Jupiter TV)

History
- Launched: April 1990; 36 years ago
- Former names: Nikkei Satellite News (1990–1999); Asia Business News (1997–1998); CNBC Business News (1998–1999)

Links
- Website: www.nikkei-cnbc.co.jp

Nikkei Consumer News and Business Channel, known as Nikkei CNBC (日経CNBC) is a business and financial news television channel broadcast in Japan. It is owned primarily by CNBC Asia and Japanese media group Nikkei, Inc. and its subsidiary, TV Tokyo Holdings Corporation.

The channel is a result of the merger of the former Nikkei Satellite News (launched 1990) and Asia Business News (launched 1997, renamed CNBC Business News in 1998) by an agreement with CNBC Asia and Nihon Keizai Shimbun.

== Programming ==
=== Former shows ===
- Tokyo Squawk Box (TOKYOスクワークボックス)
- Tokyo Power Lunch (TOKYOパワーランチ)
- Tokyo Update (TOKYOアップデート)
- Tokyo Market Wrap (TOKYOマーケットラップ)
- Weekly Wrap (ウィークリーラップ)
- Business Today (ビジネスTODAY)
- Tokyo Morning Express (TOKYOモーニングExpress)
- Tokyo Market Express (TOKYOマーケットラExpress)
- Nikkei CNBC Express (日経CNBC Express)
- Tokyo Market Watch (TOKYOマーケットウォッチ)
- China Market Flash (中国株式Flash)
- Asia Express (ASIAエクスプレス)
- News Zone
- News Core
- NIKKEI Japan Report

== Taglines ==
1. "Profit From It" (1998–2002)
2. "Make It Your Business" (2002–2004)
3. "The World Leader in Business News" (2004–2006-06-11)
4. "First in Business Worldwide" (2006-06-12–present)

== See also ==
- CNBC
