= DealStreetAsia =

Singapore-based financial news website

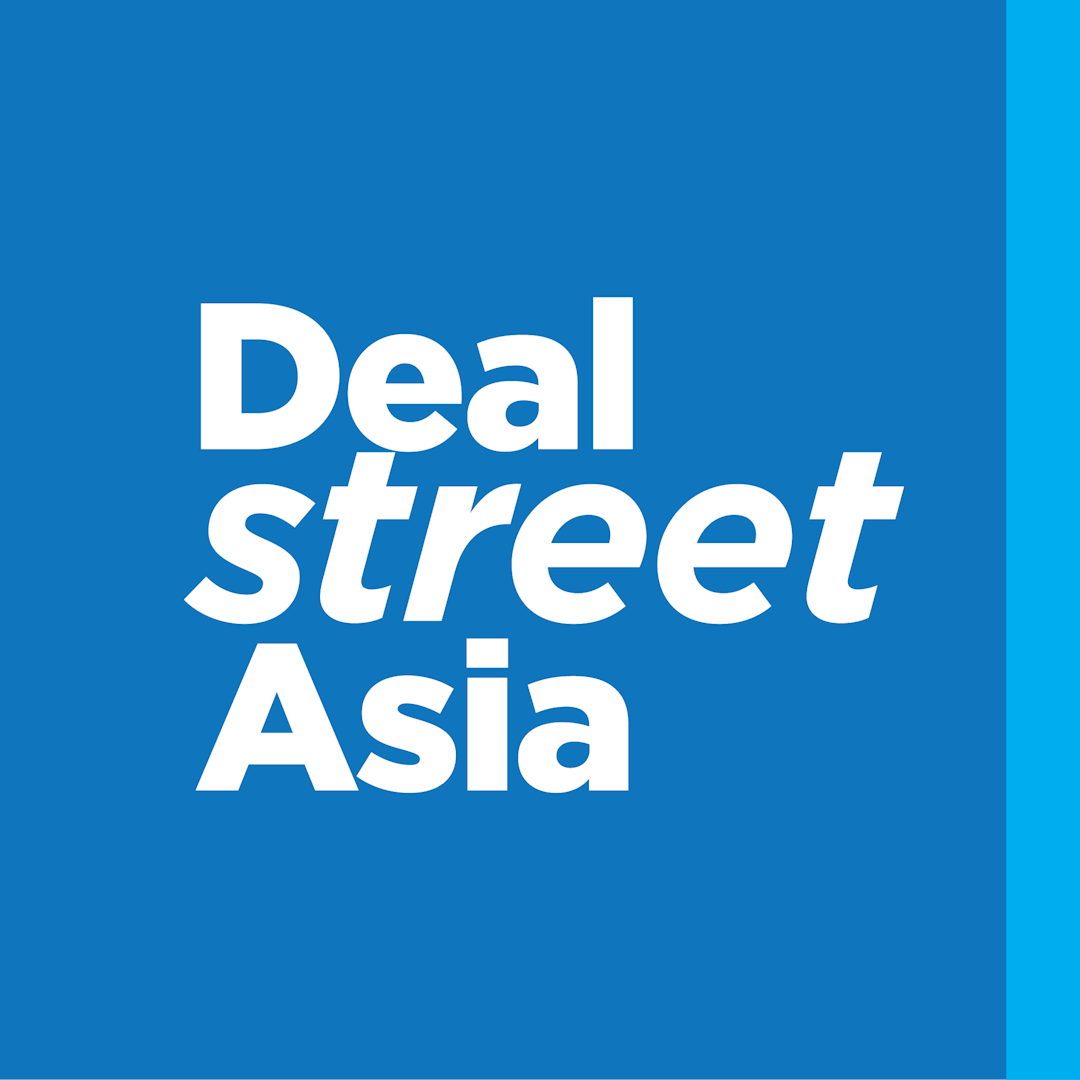
- Company type: Private Limited
- Industry: News Publishing
- Founded: 28 March 2014
- Founder: Joji Thomas Philip, Sushobhan Mukherjee
- Headquarters: Singapore
- Area served: Singapore, Indonesia, Malaysia, Hong Kong, Vietnam, Philippines, India, China, Myanmar
- Key people: Joji Thomas Philip
- Parent: Nikkei
- Website: Official website

DealStreetAsia is a Singapore-based financial news website, founded in 2014 by Joji Thomas Philip.

It is a financial news platform tracking private equity, venture capital activity, deal flows, initial public offers, investments, fund-raising, startups and targets and aspires to be the go-to destination portal for deal activity in Asia. Headquartered in Singapore, DEALSTREETASIA has a team of 30+ spread out across Indonesia, the Philippines, Vietnam, HK, China, India, Taiwan, Malaysia and Thailand. The portal's focus on breaking news and exclusives and big picture coverage helps it differentiate itself in an aggregation-dominant market.

In 2019, the Financial Times's owner Nikkei, Inc. purchased a majority stake in the company, and existing stakeholders Singapore Press Holdings, North Base Media, Alpha JWC, SGAN, Vijay Sharma, K2 Global founder Ozi Amanat, Jim Rogers and others achieved multiple returns on their investment. India's Mint (Hindustan Times) continues to remain a shareholder. The deal details were not made public.

== History ==
DealStreetAsia was founded in 2014 by the current editor-in-chief, Joji Thomas Philip.

In 2015, Sushobhan Mukherjee, joined as co-founder, and he was with the publication until early 2017.

In 2015, it announced a seed funding from Paytm founder and CEO Vijay Shekhar Sharma, the Hindustan Times Media Group (Mint), Puthen & Cole, and Singapore Angel Network.

In late 2016, DealStreetAsia organised the first iteration of the Asia PE-VC Summit, a venture capital investor conference taking place in the Asian region. The conference continues to be held annually.

In 2017, DealStreetAsia raised its pre-Series A funding led by Indonesian VC firm Alpha JWC. The round was co-led by Singapore Press Holdings (SPH). Others who participated in this round include North Base Media, Ozi Amanat of K2 Global, and angel investors such as Jim Rogers, Rajesh Yohannan (ex-Oanda).

In 2018, the company monetized subscriptions to their website. Subscriptions also comes with discounted tickets to the Asia PE-VC Summits.

In January 2019, acknowledging the role of Indonesia as the fastest-growing region within Southeast Asia, the company took its PE-VC summit to Jakarta, an annual event that has drawn in a 700-delegate strong audience over two years so far. The physical Jakarta event was not held in 2021, and it was a virtual event in 2022. The company expects to do a physical event in Jakarta in 2022.

In mid-2019, it was acquired by the Financial Times's owner Nikkei, with existing stakeholders Singapore Press Holdings, North Base Media, Alpha JWC, SGAN, Paytm's Vijay Sharma, Ozi Amanat and Jim Rogers achieving a return on investment.

In June 2021, the company launched its data business - Data Vantage.
