= Sumitomo Fudosan Roppongi Grand Tower =

Skyscraper in Japan

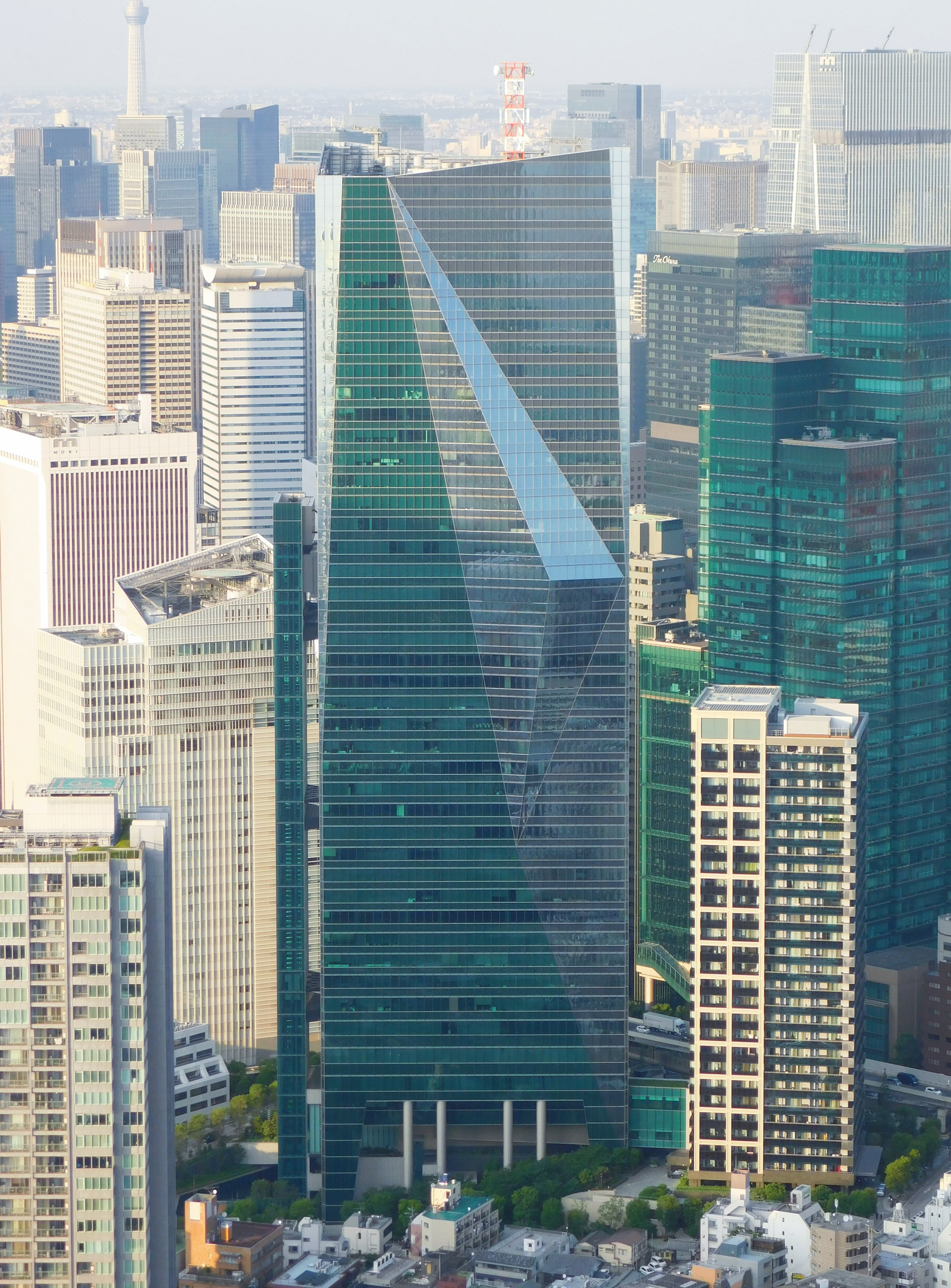
- Sumitomo Fudosan Roppongi Grand Tower in May 2023

General information
- Status: Completed
- Type: Offices, shops, residences
- Location: Roppongi, Japan
- Coordinates: 35.6646°N 139.737661°E
- Construction started: October 2013
- Completed: September 2016
- Opening: October 2016

Height
- Roof: 230.76 m (757.1 ft)
- Top floor: 43

Technical details
- Floor count: 45 (43 above ground, 2 underground)
- Floor area: 201,820 m^{2} (2,172,400 sq ft)
- Lifts/elevators: 47 (43 by Toshiba Elevator, 4 by Hitachi)

Design and construction
- Architect: Nikken Sekkei
- Developer: Sumitomo Realty & Development
- Main contractor: Obayashi Corporation; Taisei Corporation

The Sumitomo Fudosan Roppongi Grand Tower (住友不動産六本木グランドタワー) is a 231 m (roughly 758 ft) commercial skyscraper located in Roppongi, Minato ward, Tokyo.

The 40-story tower is a result of the Roppongi 3-chome East Side Project (六本木三丁目東地区プロジェクト, Roppongi san-chome higashi chiku purojekuto). Completed in September 2016, it is the largest commercial office building in Sumitomo Realty & Development's (住友不動産) property portfolio, a real estate developer that owns and manages over 200 office properties in central Tokyo.

== Construction ==
It is located in the Roppongi district of Tokyo adjacent to the Izumi Garden Tower, also owned by Sumitomo Realty, on a site that used to house the former IBM Japan Head Office Building (87.4m, 1991) and the former Roppongi Prince Hotel, closed in 2006.

The building was designed by Nikken Sekkei Ltd. and built by a joint venture between Obayashi Corporation and Taisei Corporation.

== Facilities ==
Built on a sloping site with a car passenger entrance and main atrium on the 4th floor, the 1st floor of the main office tower will be directly connected to Roppongi-itchōme Station on the Tokyo Metro Namboku Line.

=== Office tenants ===
Floors 10 to 27 and 31 to 43 are designated as commercial office space. Publicly accessible retail and restaurants will occupy floors 2 and 3. The tower is the current headquarters of TV Tokyo Holdings Corporation, including TV Tokyo and the TX Network as well as the animation studio Cue.

=== Residences ===
The main tower is joined by a 27-storey 109 meter residential building.

== Gallery ==
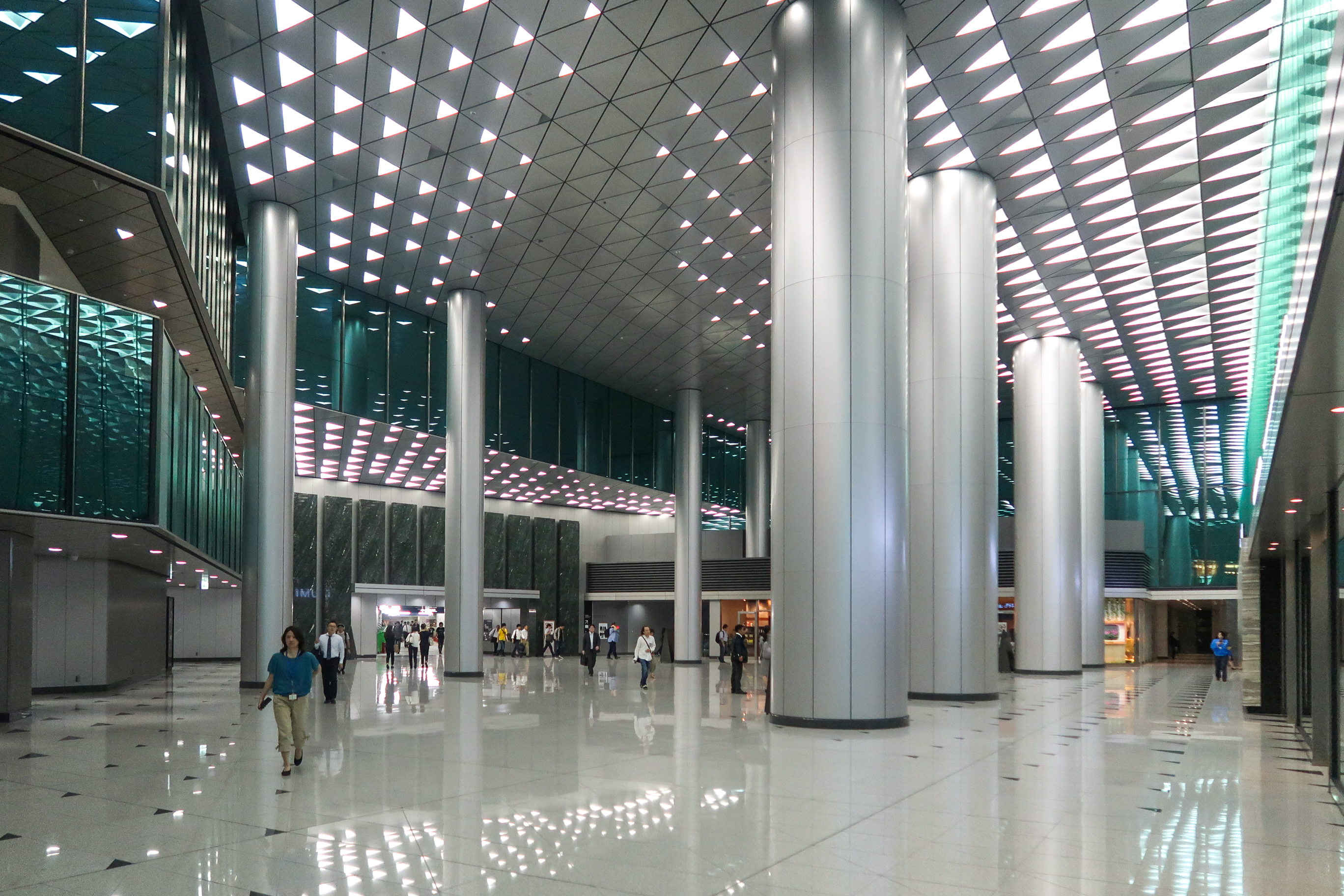
Indoor space access to office lobby.

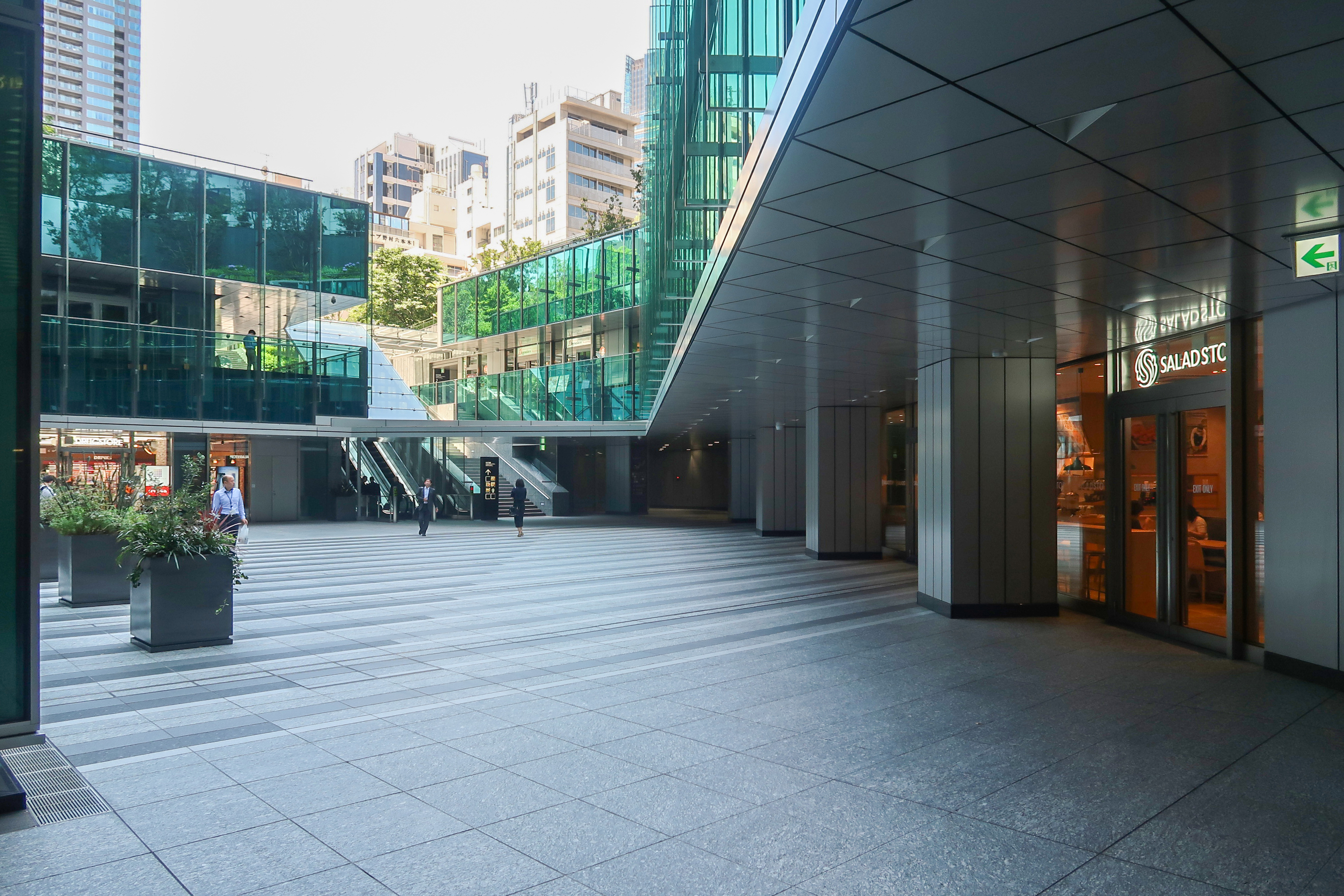
Courtyard.

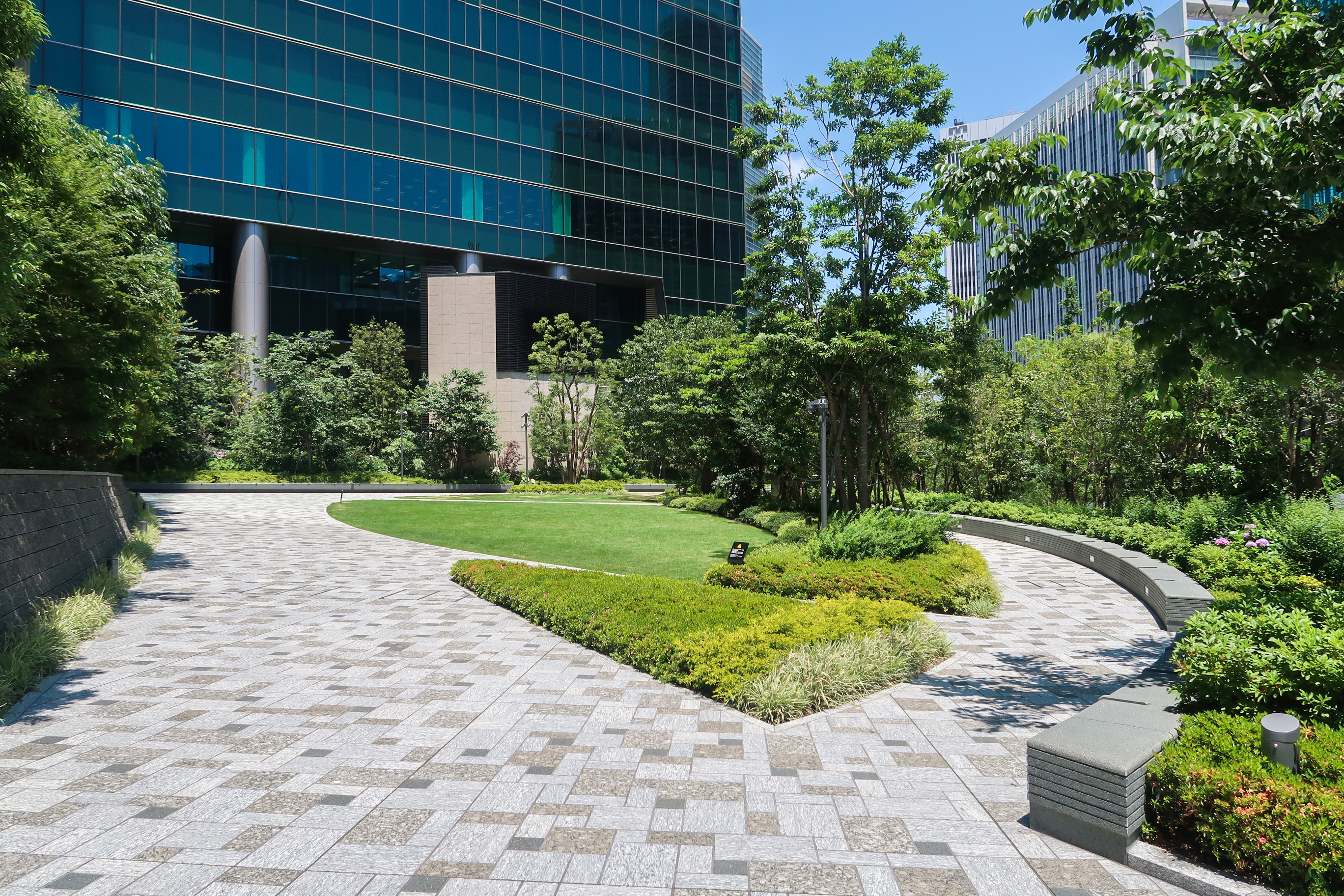
Open space.

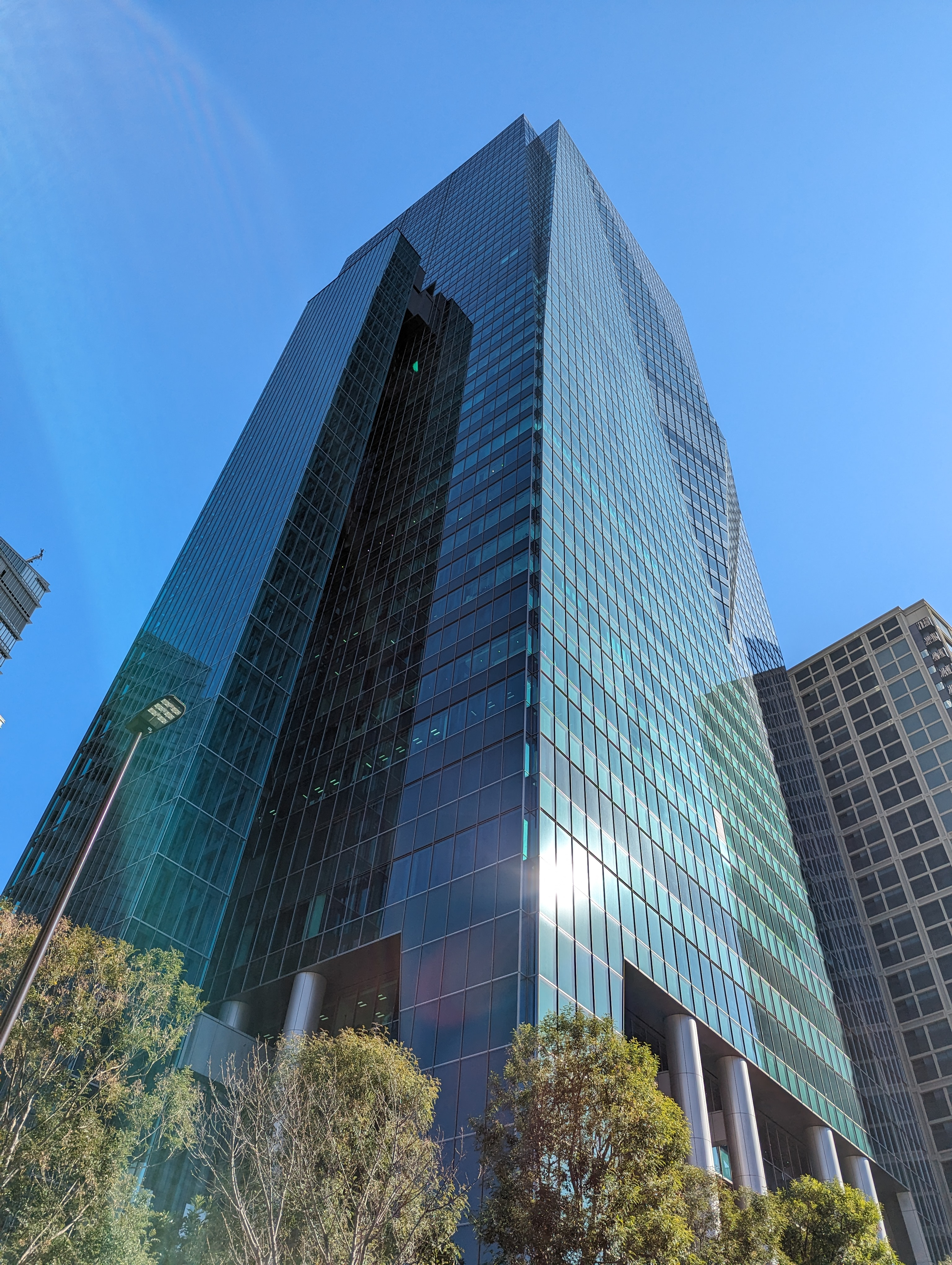
View from street level.

== See also ==
- List of tallest buildings and structures in Tokyo
