= Nikkei, Inc. =

Japanese holding company

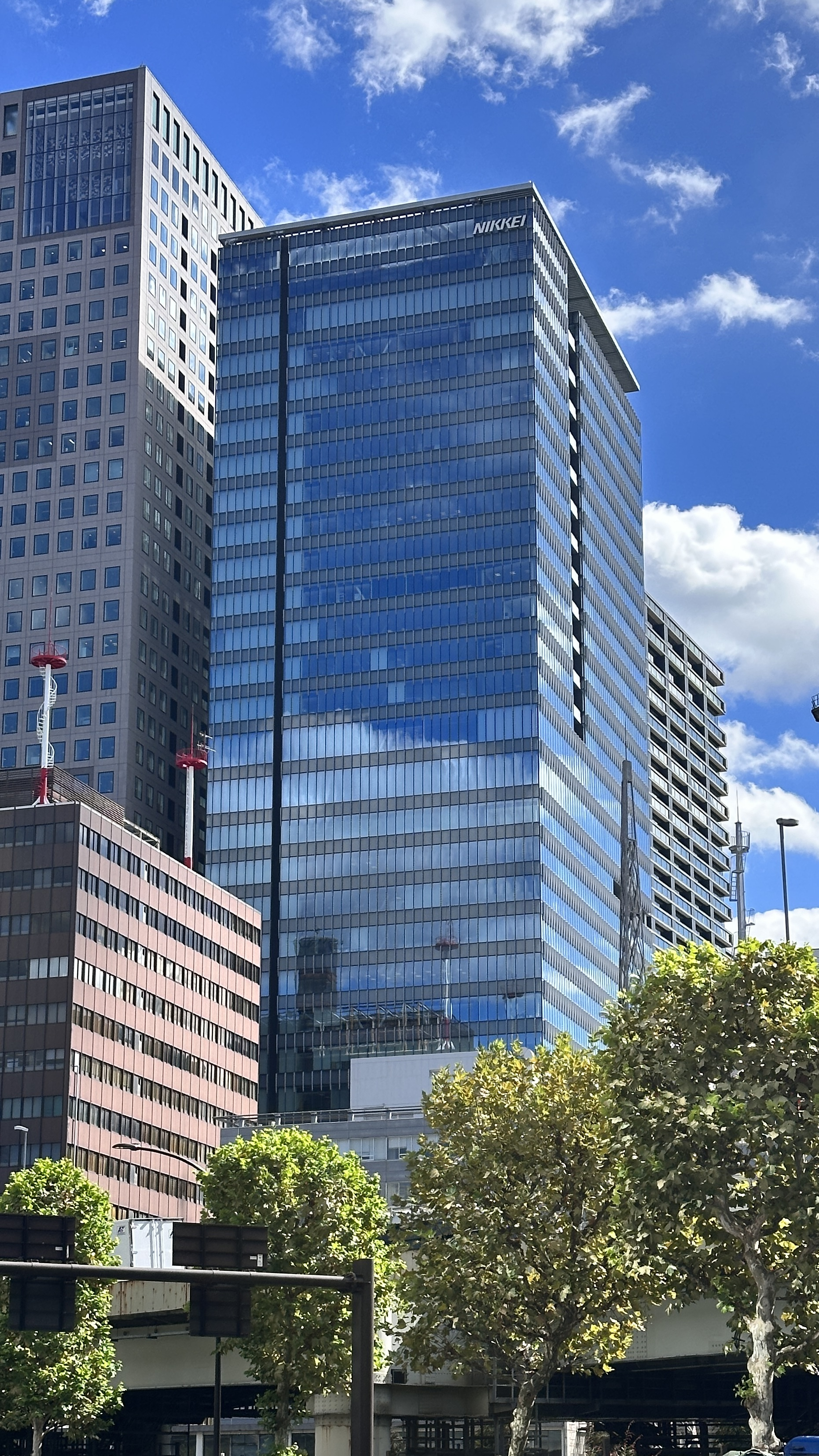
- Headquarters in Ōtemachi, Chiyoda, Tokyo
- Native name: 株式会社日本経済新聞社
- Romanized name: Kabushiki gaisha Nihon Keizai Shinbun-sha
- Type: Private
- Industry: Newspapers; Finance
- Founded: 1876; 150 years ago, in Japan
- Headquarters: Ōtemachi, Chiyoda, Tokyo, Japan
- Key people: Naotoshi Okada (chairman and Group CEO); Tsuyoshi Hasebe (president and CEO)
- Revenue: ▲¥366.5 billion (US$2.55 billion) (2023)
- Operating income: ▼¥11.4 billion (US$79.32 million) (2023)
- Net income: ▼¥9.7 billion (US$67.56 million) (2023)
- Website: www.nikkei.co.jp/nikkeiinfo/en/

Nikkei, Inc. (Japanese: 株式会社日本経済新聞社, Hepburn: Kabushiki gaisha Nihon Keizai Shinbun-sha) is a Japanese media and publishing company which owns The Nikkei and the Financial Times. Its first publication was in 1876 with the publication of The Chugai Bukka Shimpo (Domestic and Foreign Prices News). In 1946, the company name was changed to Nihon Keizai Shimbunsha, while the newspaper changed its title to the Nihon Keizai Shimbun, both of which were later shortened to Nikkei.

Nikkei is an employee-owned company; Japanese law does not allow newspaper companies to be publicly traded. In addition to the Japan-based The Nikkei newspaper (the world's largest business daily in terms of circulation), Nikkei, Inc. owns and publishes two international publications: the Nikkei Asia weekly news magazine and the London headquartered Financial Times daily newspaper. Furthermore, it is the owner of the TX Network, of which TV Tokyo is the flagship station. Nikkei, Inc.'s holdings include companies in books, magazines to digital media, database services, broadcasting, and other activities such as economic/cultural events.

== Holdings ==
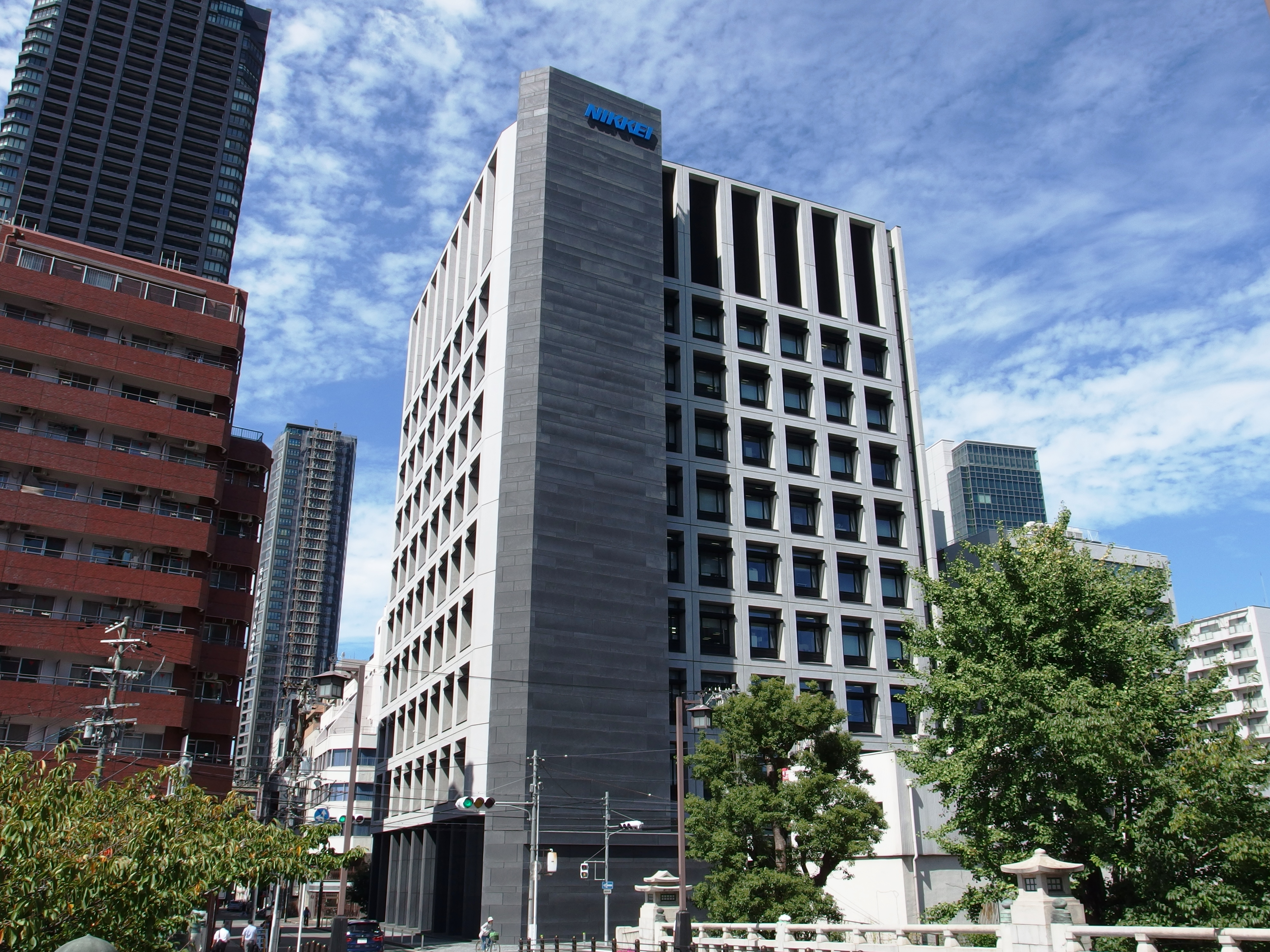
Nikkei offices in Osaka

Nikkei Inc. specializes in publishing financial, business and industry news. Its main news publications include:

- Financial Times, the London-headquartered daily newspaper.
- Nikkei Asia, the company's flagship English-language business and politics journal that launched in November 2013. It was previously known as the Nikkei Asian Review.
- Nihon Keizai Shimbun (日本経済新聞), a leading economic newspaper.
- Nikkei Veritas (日経ヴェリタス), a weekly financial newspaper that replaced Nikkei Kinyu Shimbun (Nikkei Financial Daily) in March 2008.
- Nikkei Business Daily (日経産業新聞, Nikkei Sangyo Shimbun), an industry newspaper
- Nikkei Marketing Journal (日経MJ, Nikkei MJ), a commerce newspaper
- Nikkei Weekly (日経ウィークリー), an English-language business newspaper

Nikkei sells these newspapers around the world, in their original languages and in translation. It also makes many of its Japanese articles available in English through wire services, an English-language website, and a licensing agreement with LexisNexis. In Japan the price of the newspaper morning edition is 160 yen. The afternoon edition is 70 yen and subscription is 4,509 yen/month (morning and afternoon edition). Nikkei agreed on 23 July 2015 to buy the UK-based FT Group, which includes business daily Financial Times, for the equivalent of $1.32 billion from Pearson PLC.

On 30 November 2015, Nikkei completed acquisition of Financial Times from Pearson plc. Nikkei also owns TV Tokyo and Nikkei CNBC, which provides coverage of the Japanese market during trading hours and rebroadcasts CNBC during off-hours and weekends.

== Nikkei Group affiliate companies ==
Major companies:

- Nikkei Business Publications, Inc. (Nikkei BP)
- Nikkei CNBC
- Nikkei Radio Broadcasting Corporation (Radio Nikkei)
- QUICK Corporation
- Nikkei Science (50%)
- Nikkei National Geographic (50%)
- TV Tokyo Holdings Corporation (33.64%)
  - TV Tokyo
- TV Osaka (23.9%)
- TV Aichi (20.9%)
- TV Hokkaido (19.9%)
- TVQ Kyushu (19.9%)
- Rating & Investment Information, Inc. (58.6%)
- Financial Times Ltd. (100%)
- Winkontent – Monocle Magazine (not disclosed)

== Relationship with the government ==
Nikkei Inc. through its main publication The Nikkei is said to have formed an "institutionalized" relationship with the national government through the "press clubs", where large national newspapers such as The Nikkei are given "privileged access to officials, whose perspectives they end up sharing." This symbiotic relationship between the government and national newspapers and broadcasters leads publications to "avoiding any actual confrontation with the administration".

According to reporters such as Shusuke Murai and Reiji Yoshida from The Japan Times, the Nikkei was "depending too much on leaks — apparently provided by corporate insiders" and that the paper was "often seen as reluctant to bluntly criticize Japanese firms." The New York Times reporter Hiroko Tabuchi said the Nikkei's purchase of the FT was "worrying", further stating that "Nikkei is basically a PR machine for Japanese biz; it initially ignored the 2011 Olympus accounting scandal (which FT broke). Nikkei has also hardly covered the Takata airbag defect; almost no investigative work on that issue whatsoever. Nikkei is Japan Inc."
