= TV Aichi =

Television station in Nagoya, Japan

JOCI-DTV

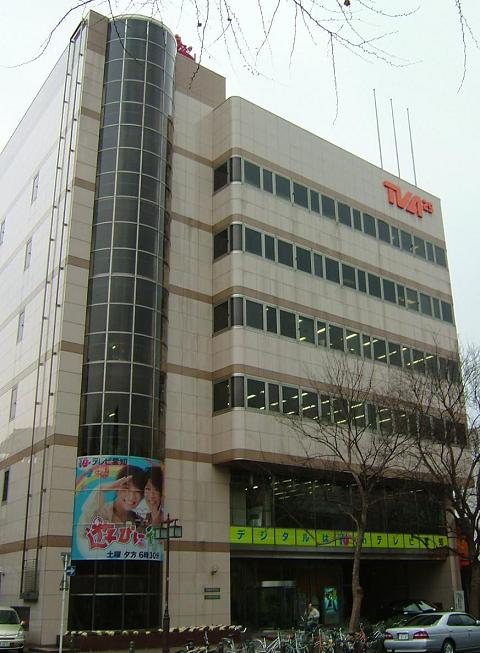
- Headquarters in Naka-ku, Nagoya
- Aichi Prefecture; Japan
- City: Nagoya
- Channels: Digital: 23 (UHF, Nagoya) 26 (UHF, Toyohashi); Virtual: 10
- Branding: TV Aichi; TVA

Programming
- Language: Japanese
- Affiliations: TX Network

Ownership
- Owner: Aichi Television Broadcasting Co., Ltd.

History
- Founded: December 1, 1982
- First air date: September 1, 1983
- Former call signs: JOCI-TV (1983-2011)
- Former channel numbers: Analog (1983–2011): 25 (UHF, Nagoya); 52 (UHF, Toyohashi)
- Call sign meaning: AiChI

Technical information
- Licensing authority: MIC

Links
- Website: www.tv-aichi.co.jp

Aichi Television Broadcasting Company, Ltd. (TVA; Japanese: テレビ愛知株式会社, romanized: Terebi Aichi kabushiki gaisha), also referred to as TV Aichi (テレビ愛知, Terebi Aichi), with the callsigns JOCI-DTV (channel 10) is a Japanese television station in Nagoya serving as the affiliate of the TX Network for the Aichi prefecture. TVA started broadcasting in 1983. Nikkei, Inc. is the biggest shareholder of TVA.

== History ==
After concluding its restructuring plan, TV Tokyo began building its own national network, starting with TV Osaka on March 1, 1982. Later, TV Tokyo and its main shareholder Nikkei announced plans to open a station in Nagoya and invited Chunichi Shimbun to take part in its creation. In November 1981, Nikkei solicited the Ministry of Posts and Telecommunications for the opening of a new television station in Aichi Prefecture. By late February 1982, 105 companies have expressed interest in the bid. MPT suggested a meeting with the then-governor of Aichi Mikine Kuwahara and the then-president of Tokai Bank Shigemitsu Miyake to present a merger of their bids. On July 6, the companies that were attracted by the bid merged to form TV Aichi and requested a license, obtaining a preliminary license on July 13. On September 6, TVA held its founders' meeting, followed by a founders' general assembly on December 1. Construction work for its headquarters began on August 26, 1982, the Nikkei Nagoya Broadcasting Hall. On August 2, 1983, the station moved there in order to begin its activities. TVA chose the work of designer Shigeo Okamoto for its logo (still in use) and was also in charge of the station's sign-on and sign-off animations (withdrawn when the analog signals shut down in 2011). It became the second UHF station in Nagoya, after Chukyo TV, which started fourteen years earlier.

On September 1, 1983, at 5:59am, TV Aichi started broadcasting, the fifth commercial TV station in Nagoya and the hundredth commercial TV station to be set up at a national scale. The first program seen was the Japanese dance Kiyomoto: Dance of the Two Seasons. The station recorded a prime time share of 9.1% on opening night. In the fourth quarter of the year, the station recorded a 5% share during prime time (7-10pm), 4.5% during golden time (7-11pm) and a full-day average of 2%. During the first quarter of 1985, these figures rose to 6.8%, 6% and 2.9% respectively. TVA obtained a profit of 12 million yen in 1985, the first time since launch. In 1988, prime time ratings obtained a 7.6% share, golden time obtained 6.7% and all-day, a 3.2% average. That year, it liquidated its accumulated losses. In 1990, it started issuing stock dividends.

TVA recorded an average growth rate higher than 10% in revenue and profits during the 1990s, at a rate higher than the four other TV stations in Nagoya. Revenue jumped from 42nd place in 1992 to 24th place in 1997 among all of the commercial television stations. In 1996, its revenue reached 10,846 billion yen, surpassing the 10 billion yen mark for the first time; its profit hit 1,324 billion yen, also a new record. In 1998, revenue rose to 11,224 billion yen and its profit was 1,285 billion yen. The good financial results also led in improvements to its programming and ratings throughout the 90s. In 1997, prime time ratings recorded 8.7% share, golden time 7.9% and all-day 4.0% average. Although the evening metrics were the second-highest in its history, the all-day average was an all-time record. On December 14, 1997, TVA had obtained the highest ratings average for an entire day for 100 weeks straight, a record for TXN's stations. The amount of in-house productions increased to 11% in 1998, up from just 7% in 1993.

On December 1, 2003, TVA started digital terrestrial television broadcasts, using LCN 10 instead of the standard TXN LCN 7. On July 24, 2011, its analog signal shut down. The station celebrated its 35th anniversary in 2018, doing promotional actions throughout the year and a five-hour special program on September 1. In 2020, it joined the Locipo VOD service alongside Tokai TV, CBC and Chukyo TV.

== Programming ==
At launch, it used the slogans "Channel 25 for Love and Intelligence" and "TV Aichi for a Smiling Family" to promote itself. Its programming initially consisted largely of local news, lifestyle programs, business programs and women's interest programs. The goal was to set up 10% of its programming to be locally-made. The first news program was TVA Hot Report (TVAホットレポート), which aired on weekdays at 5pm. It was replaced in 1991 with TV Aichi News at 5 O'Clock (5時ですテレビ愛知ニュース). It recorded a share of 3.8% in 1996. The station changed its airtime for local news in 1997 and replaced it with News Sunset Ichiban (ニュース夕方いちばん), now starting at 5:25pm. That year, it also aired the moment when Nagoya was selected as the host city of a specialized expo in 2005. Since 2020, the evening news program is 5 O'Clock Studio (5時スタ). Data Analysis| Sunday Journal (データで解析!サンデージャーナル) airs on Sunday afternoons and collects data from the largest cities of Japan.。

In its early years, the channel aired TV Culture Housewife DO! (TVカルチャー奥さまDO！), a program aimed at women, as well as Minomonta no Shukan Desuyo (みのもんたの時間ですよー), on Saturday afternoons, and economic programs such as Tokai no Gunzoku. It also produced historical dramas such as Mori Runmaru and Nagoya Castle for Women. Recent non-news programming includes Nogizaka Construction, a late night show on Fridays, since 2015. Since 1998, it airs a music show, Kuro Channel (黒ちゃんねる). Kusuguru (くすぐる) is a local information program airing on Saturday mornings.。

TVA airs Nippon Professional Baseball. Ratings for its games in 1993 attracted an average share of 16,4%. That year, it started airing J-League attracting an average share of 11,2%, but fell to 6,9% in the following year. In 1996, TVA aired golf and NASCAR for the first time. In 1998, it began producing Doragura (どらぐら) with the latest news from the Chunichi Dragons and the Nagoya Grampus Eights.

TVA is also in charge of TXN's 8am Saturday morning anime slot. In 2020, the anime was Cardfight!! Vanguard.

== Website ==
- Official website (in Japanese)
