= The Nikkei =

Japanese newspaper

The Nihon Keizai Shimbun

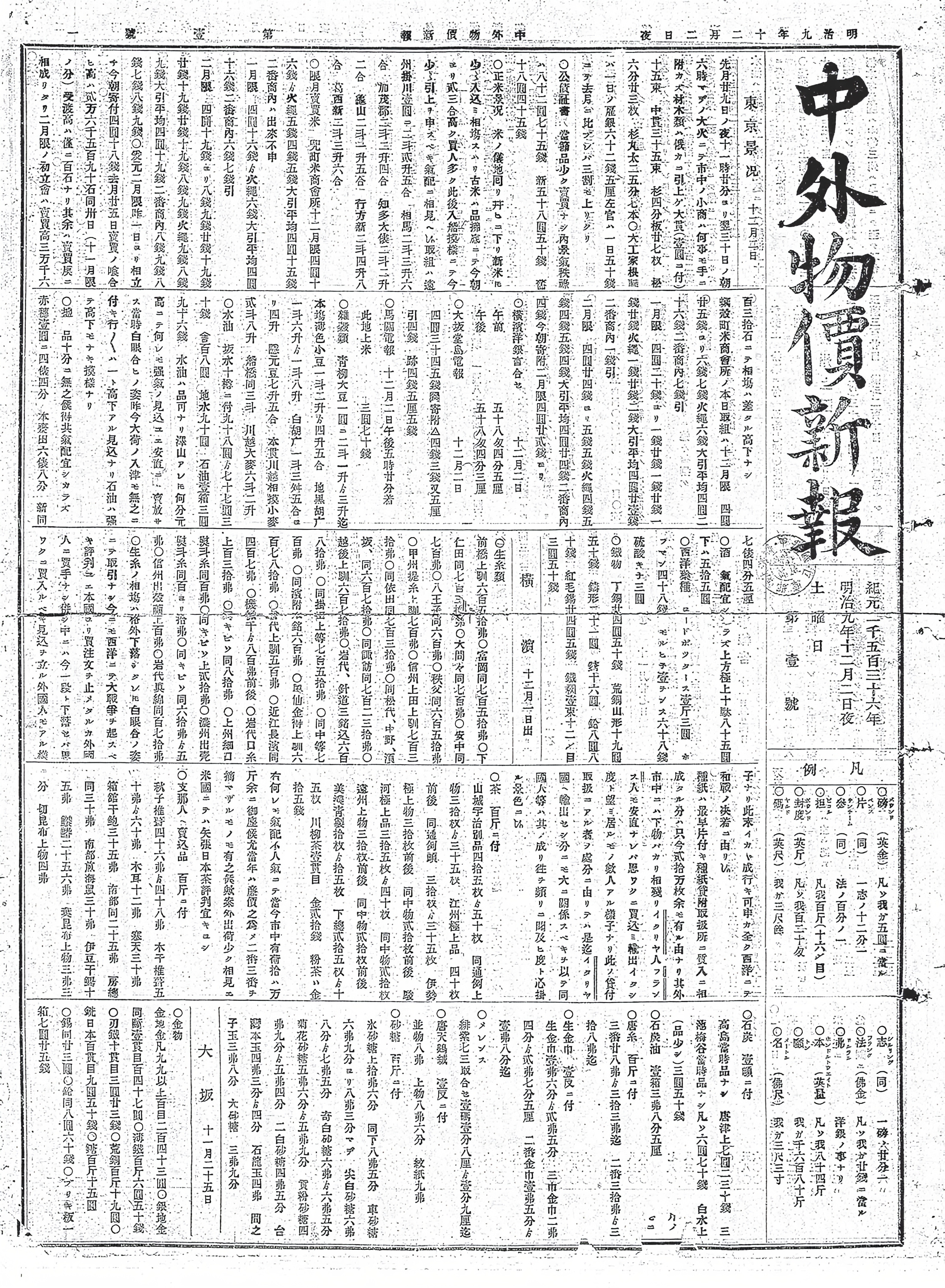
- First issue 'Chugai Bukka Shimpo', 1876
- Type: Daily newspaper
- Format: Blanket (54.6 cm x 40.65 cm)
- Owner: Nikkei, Inc.
- Publisher: Tsuneo Kita
- Founded: 2 December 1876; 149 years ago (as The Nihon Keizai Shimbun)
- Political alignment: Centre-right; Neoliberalism; Conservative liberalism Conservatism
- Language: Japanese and English
- Headquarters: Tokyo, Japan
- Country: Japan
- Circulation: 1,170,000 Morning; 1,060,000 Electronic version
- Website: www.nikkei.com

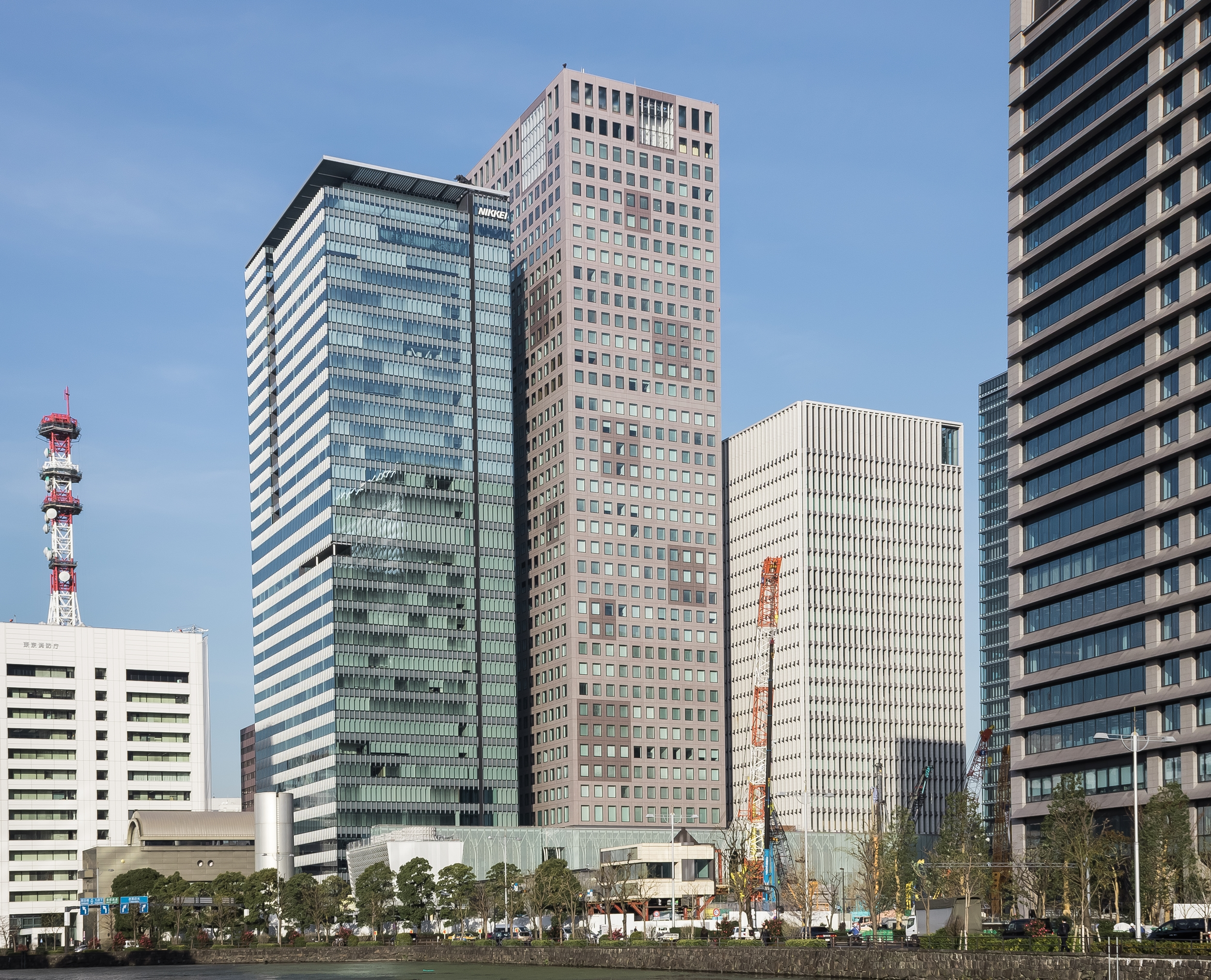
Nikkei headquarters on the left in Ōtemachi, Chiyoda, Tokyo

The Nikkei, also known as The Nihon Keizai Shimbun (日本経済新聞; lit. "Japan Economics Newspaper"), is the flagship publication of Nikkei, Inc. (based in Tokyo) and the world's largest financial newspaper, with over 2 million subscribers. The Nikkei 225, a stock market index for the Tokyo Stock Exchange, has been calculated by the newspaper since 1950. It is the country's only business daily.

It is one of the four national newspapers in Japan; the other three are The Asahi Shimbun, The Yomiuri Shimbun, and the Mainichi Shimbun.

== History ==
The roots of the Nikkei started in 1876, when an in-house newspaper department of Mitsui & Company started publication of Chugai Bukka Shimpo (literally Domestic and Foreign Commodity Price Newspaper), a weekly market-quotation bulletin. The department was spun out as the Shokyosha in 1882. The paper became daily (except Sunday) in 1885 and was renamed Chugai Shōgyō Shimpo in 1889. It was merged with Nikkan Kōgyō and Keizai Jiji and renamed Nihon Sangyō Keizai Shimbun in 1942. It changed its name to the Nihon Keizai Shimbun in 1946.

An agreement with Singapore Press Holdings was signed on April 25, 1990 for the printing of a same-day edition for Southeast Asia, which was set to be published for the first time in Singapore from October 1.

== Criticism ==
According to Shusuke Murai and Reiji Yoshida from The Japan Times, critics say the Nikkei is "depending too much on leaks—apparently provided by corporate insiders—and the paper is often seen as reluctant to bluntly criticize Japanese firms." The New York Times reporter Hiroko Tabuchi said the Nikkei's purchase of the Financial Times was "worrying", further stating:

[The] Nikkei is basically a PR machine for Japanese biz; it initially ignored the 2011 Olympus accounting scandal (which the FT broke). Nikkei has also hardly covered the Takata airbag defect; almost no investigative work on that issue whatsoever. Nikkei is Japan Inc.

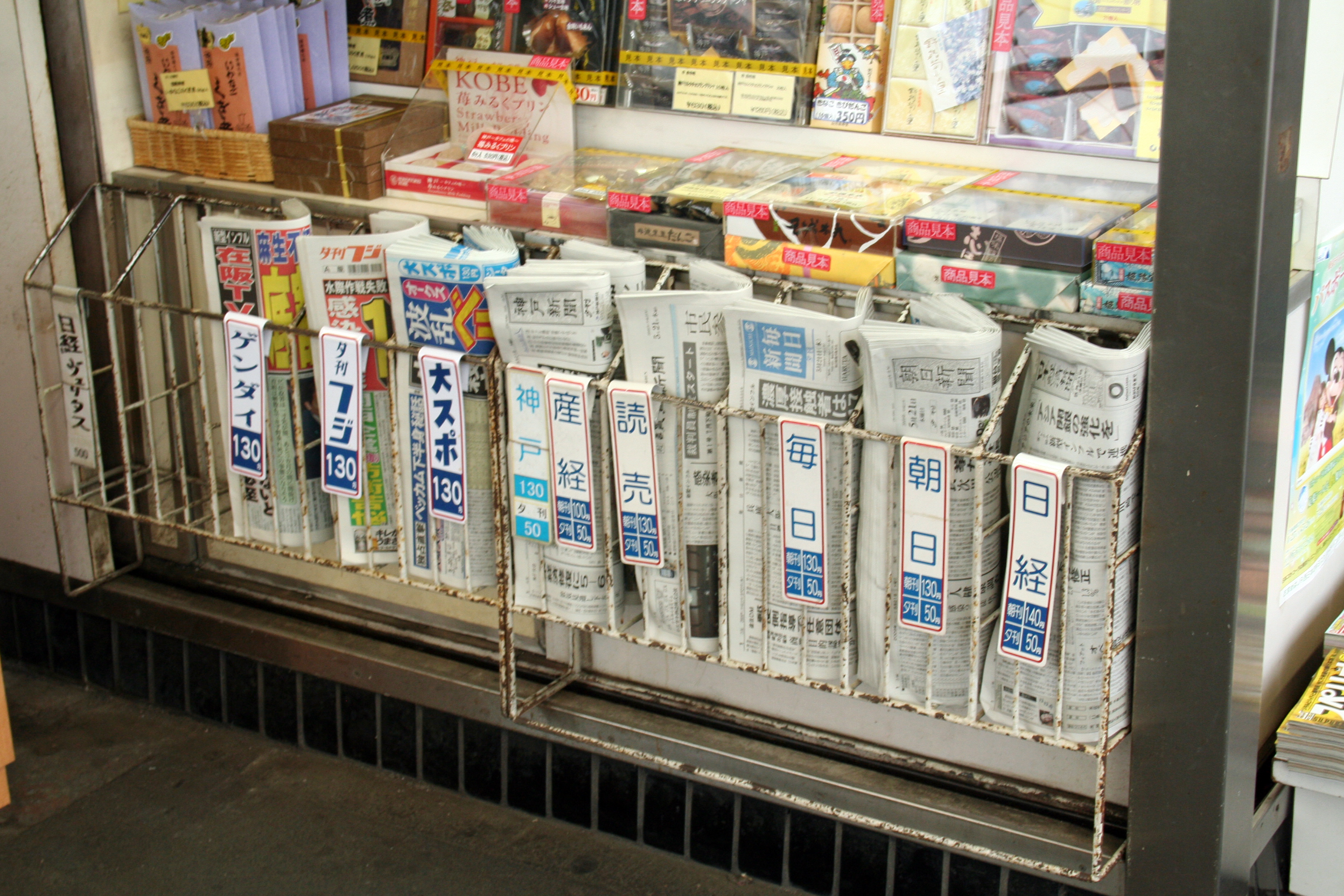
Newspapers including Nihon Keizai Shimbun are displayed at station shops.

== Hong Kong ==
On August 10, 2020, three Hong Kong Police Force officers visited the Hong Kong branch of The Nikkei with a court order amid investigations over an advertisement placed in the newspaper a year prior calling for international support for the pro-democracy protests in Hong Kong.

== See also ==
- Nikkei Asia
- TX Network
