= TV Tokyo Holdings =

Japanese holding company

TV Tokyo Holdings Corporation
- Logo used since 2023

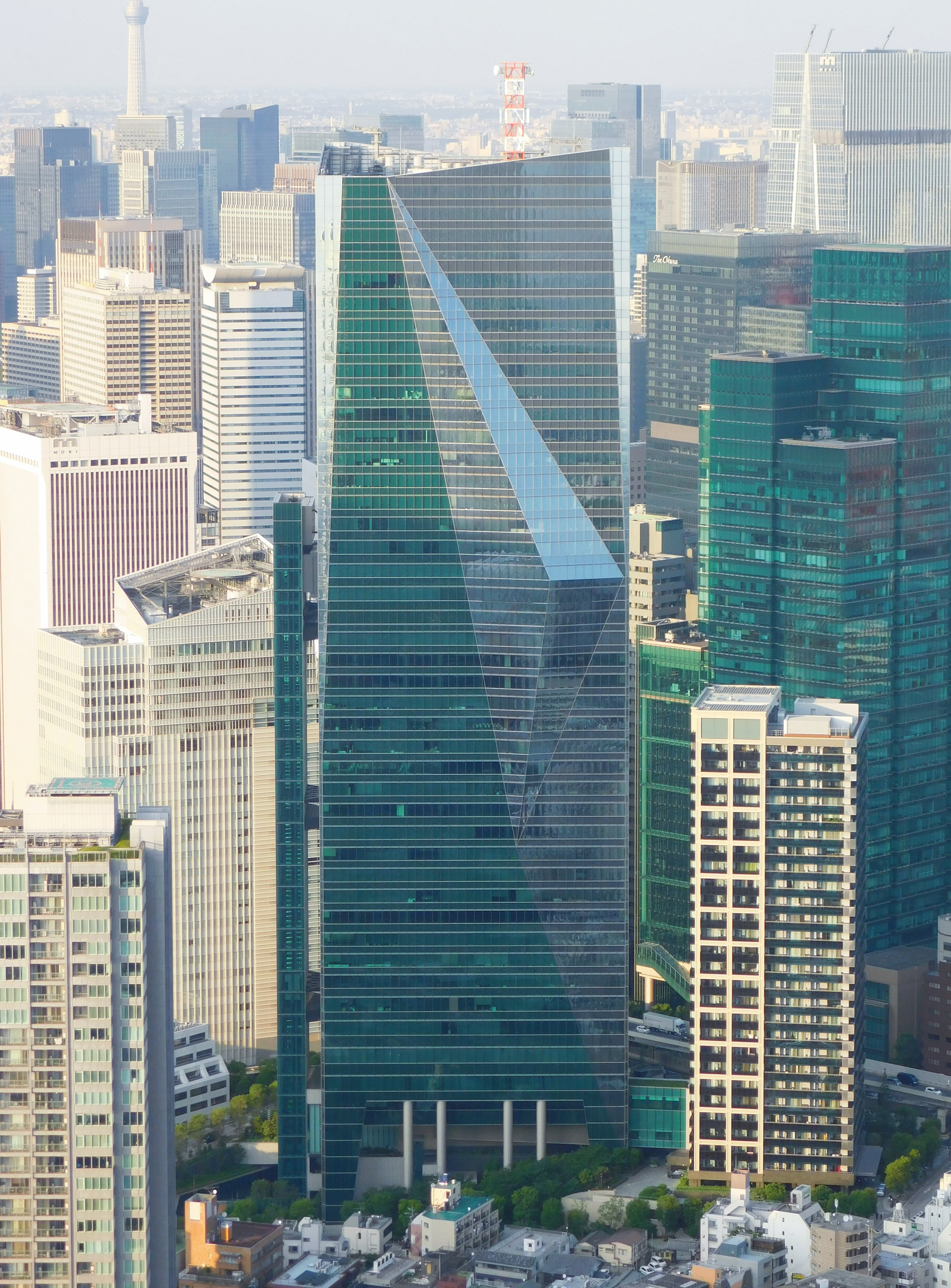
- TV Tokyo Holdings and TV Tokyo's headquarters at Sumitomo Fudosan Roppongi Grand Tower in Minato, Tokyo
- Trade name: TXHD
- Native name: 株式会社テレビ東京ホールディングス
- Romanized name: Kabushiki gaisha Terebi Tōkyō Hōrudingusu
- Type: Public KK
- Traded as: TYO: 9413
- Industry: Media
- Founded: October 1, 2010; 15 years ago
- Headquarters: Sumitomo Fudosan Roppongi Grand Tower, Roppongi, Minato, Tokyo, Japan
- Key people: Ichiro Ishikawa (president); Shigeru Komagone (chairman)
- Services: Broadcasting; Television production
- Revenue: ¥128,667 million (consolidated, March 2015)
- Operating income: ¥5,0050 million (consolidated, March 2015)
- Net income: ¥3,089 million (consolidated, March 2015)
- Total assets: ¥100,565 million (consolidated, March 2015)
- Owner: Nikkei, Inc. (32.64%)
- Number of employees: 1,422
- Subsidiaries: TV Tokyo Corporation; BS TV Tokyo Corporation; TV Tokyo Communications Corporation; TV Tokyo Productions; TV Tokyo Mediaworks; TV Tokyo Art; TV Tokyo Business Services; Technomax; Real Max
- Website: https://www.txhd.co.jp

The TV Tokyo Holdings Corporation (Note: Japanese: 株式会社テレビ東京ホールディングス, Hepburn: Kabushiki gaisha Terebi Tōkyō Hōrudingusu) (TXHD) is a Japanese media holding company headquartered in Minato, Tokyo, consisting of TV Tokyo Corporation, one of Japan's main five commercial broadcasters, TV Tokyo Communications, which provides the group's internet and streaming services and BS TV Tokyo, which acts as the Broadcasting Satellite channel of the group. TV Tokyo also runs the TX Network, Japan's smallest station network consisting of TV Tokyo themselves, serving the wider Kanto region, alongside five affiliates in five prefectures in Japan. The company was formed on October 1, 2010, with the merger of TV Tokyo, TV Tokyo Broadband and BS Japan. Previously, TV Tokyo had shares in the latter two. The company is partially controlled by Nikkei, Inc., which owns 32.64% of the company's shares.

Since other broadcasters such as Fuji Television, TBS, Nippon Television and TV Asahi were restructured as the corporate functions were moved to certified holding company statuses with the broadcasting operations taken over by wholly owned subsidiaries, TV Tokyo is the only broadcaster in Japan (until 2023) to keep its corporate functions after the merger with TXBB and BS Japan was completed, due to the broadcaster's relationship with Nikkei as well as having only six affiliates in its network, which also held shares in TV Tokyo and the affiliates themselves.

== History ==
On March 29, 2010, TV Tokyo Corporation, TV Tokyo Broadband and BS Japan announced that it would form a joint holding company, which would merge its businesses. One of the reasons TXHD was formed was due to the companies' plans to improve its management efficiency as well as the emergence of video services in Japan at that time. The merger would be done through a joint stock transfer, rather than a full restructuring of TV Tokyo. On September 1, 2010, the Ministry of Internal Affairs and Communications received preliminary approval from TV Tokyo, BS Japan and TV Tokyo Broadband to merge. That same month, TV Tokyo and TXBB were delisted from the Tokyo Stock Exchange. The company itself was formed on October 1, 2010, with its shares being listed on TSE. On May 30, 2012, TV Tokyo sold InterFM to the Kinoshita Group. On July 26, 2018, it was announced that BS Japan would rebrand to BS TV Tokyo which took effect by October 1 of that year. On October 24, 2023, in commemoration of TV Tokyo's 60th anniversary, TV Tokyo introduced a new logo, which began applying on TXHD and all TV Tokyo group companies by the following month.
