= Nikkei Asia =

Tokyo-based English-language magazine

- Type: Weekly news magazine
- Owner: Nikkei, Inc.
- Editor-in-chief: Shigesaburo Okumura
- Former name: Nikkei Asian Review
- Founded: 2013
- Language: English
- Headquarters: Tokyo, Japan
- Sister newspapers: Financial Times
- Website: asia.nikkei.com

Nikkei Asia, known as Nikkei Asian Review between 2013 and 2020, is a major Japan-based English-language weekly news magazine focused on the Asian continent, although it also covers broader international developments. It is headquartered in Tokyo, Japan and was originally launched in 2013.

== Ownership ==
Nikkei Asia is owned by Nikkei, Inc., Japan’s largest financial news group and the publisher of the country’s leading business daily, The Nikkei. In July 2015, Nikkei, Inc. acquired the London-based Financial Times from Pearson PLC for £844 million, marking a significant expansion of its international media portfolio.

Since the acquisition, editorial collaboration between Nikkei Asia and the Financial Times has deepened, including content sharing, joint reporting on major regional developments, and cross-posting of selected articles. Journalists from the Financial Times are occasionally seconded to Nikkei Asia as part of staff exchange programs aimed at promoting international best practices in financial and geopolitical journalism.

== History ==
The magazine was launched in November 2013 under the title Nikkei Asian Review by Nikkei, Inc. to address growing global interest in Asian economies and to provide in-depth reporting on regional business and politics. It aimed to serve business executives, investors, policymakers, and academics by offering analysis and commentary from correspondents across Asia.

In September 2020, the publication renamed Nikkei Asian Review to Nikkei Asia, reflecting a shift toward a digital-first model and a broader editorial mandate to reach an international audience beyond business readers. The rebranding was part of Nikkei's effort to position the magazine as a central voice in global conversations about Asia's geopolitical and economic transformation.

In 2022, Nikkei Asia and Media Indonesia won the most journalism awards at WAN-IFRA's Asian Media Awards.

== Audience and reach ==
Nikkei Asia targets a global readership that includes investors, business leaders, policy analysts, and scholars interested in Asia's economic and political developments. Its coverage resonates particularly in markets such as Japan, Singapore, India, Hong Kong, and the United States.

The magazine is also available through institutional subscriptions at major universities and business schools, including Harvard Business School, INSEAD, and the University of Tokyo.

Nikkei Asia calls itself the "voice of the Asian century".
