= TV Tokyo =

Television station in Tokyo

JOTX-DTV
- Logo used since 2023

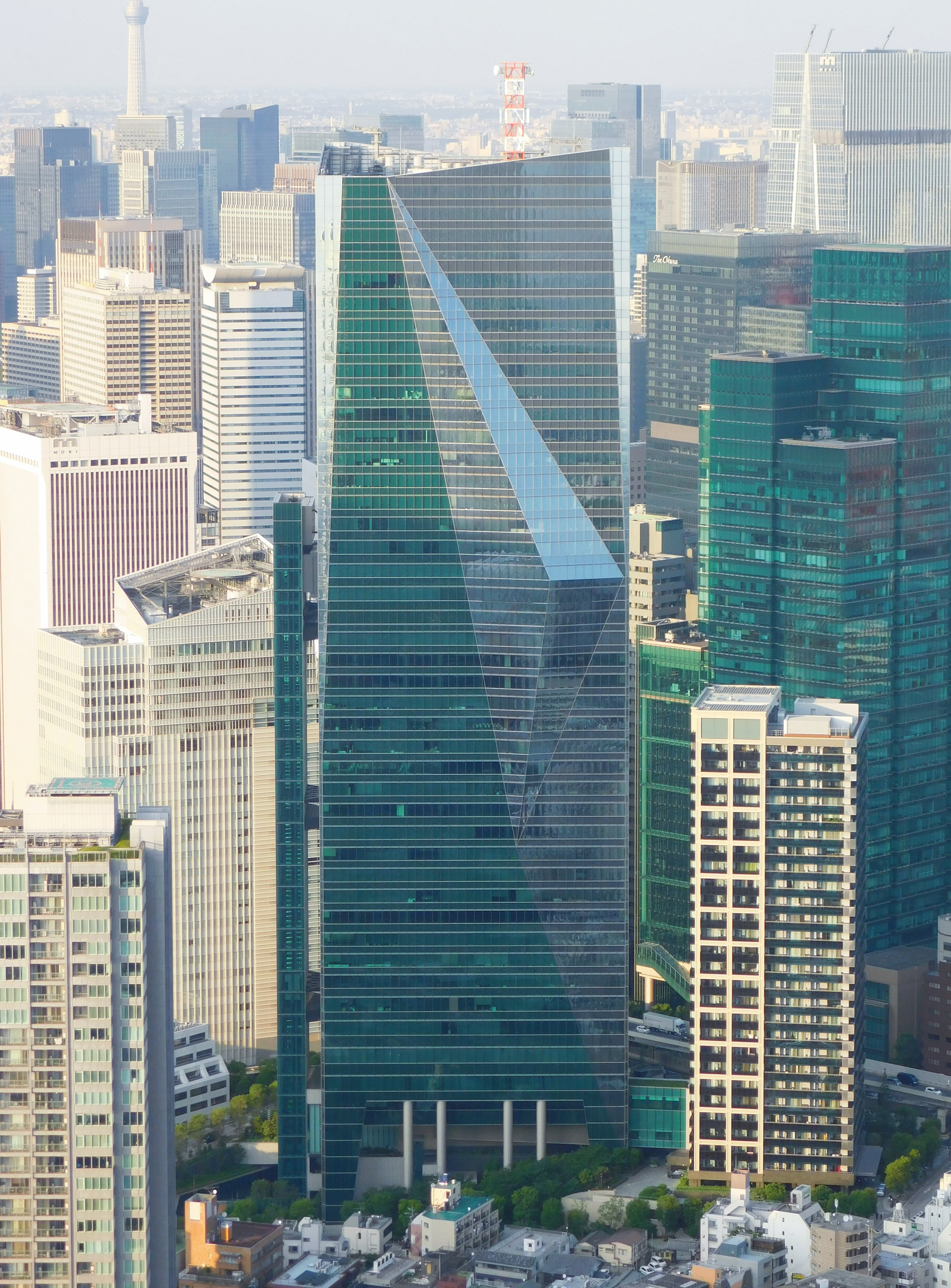
- Headquarters building in Minato, Tokyo
- Kantō region; Japan
- City: Tokyo
- Channels: Digital: 23 (UHF); Virtual: 7
- Branding: TV Tokyo

Programming
- Language: Japanese
- Affiliations: TX Network (1983–present)

Ownership
- Owner: TV Tokyo Corporation

History
- First air date: April 22, 1964
- Former call signs: JOTX-TV (1964–2011)
- Former names: Science TV Tokyo Channel 12 (1964–1968); Tokyo Channel 12 (1968–1981)
- Former channel numbers: Analog: 12 (VHF, 1964–2011)
- Former affiliations: Independent (1964–1983)
- Call sign meaning: T for Tokyo

Technical information
- Licensing authority: MIC
- ERP: 10 kW (68 kW ERP)
- Transmitter coordinates: 35°39′50″N 139°44′36″E

Links
- Website: tv-tokyo.co.jp

Corporate information
- Company
- Native name: 株式会社テレビ東京
- Romanized name: Kabushiki gaisha Terebi Tōkyō
- Formerly: Tokyo Channel 12 Production, Ltd. (1968–1973); Tokyo Channel 12, Ltd. (1973–1981); Television Tokyo Channel 12, Ltd. (1981–2004)
- Type: Subsidiary KK
- Traded as: TYO: 9411
- Industry: Media
- Founded: July 1, 1968
- Headquarters: Sumitomo Fudosan Roppongi Grand Tower, Roppongi, Minato, Tokyo, Japan
- Area served: Worldwide, mainly Japan
- Key people: Ichiro Ishikawa (president and CEO)
- Services: Television broadcasting
- Parent: TV Tokyo Holdings Corporation
- Subsidiaries: TV Tokyo Medianet; TV Tokyo Music; TV Tokyo Direct; TV Tokyo America; AT-X
- Website: www.tv-tokyo.co.jp/kaisha/

JOTX-DTV (channel 7), branded as TV Tokyo, (Note: Japanese: テレビ東京, Hepburn: Terebi Tōkyō; TX, often stylized in all caps, abbreviated and branded on-screen as テレ東 (Teretō)) is a Japanese television station that serves as the flagship of the TX Network. It is owned and operated by TV Tokyo Corporation, (Note: Japanese: 株式会社テレビ東京, Hepburn: Kabushiki gaisha Terebi Tōkyō) itself a subsidiary of the TV Tokyo Holdings Corporation, in turn controlled by Nikkei, Inc. It is headquartered in the Sumitomo Fudosan Roppongi Grand Tower in Roppongi, Minato, Tokyo. TV Tokyo is one of the five private broadcasters based in Tokyo and the last to have started its broadcasts on VHF.

The predecessor of TV Tokyo was Tokyo Channel 12, which was broadcast using the bandwidth returned by the US military stationed in Japan. However, similar to Nippon Educational Television (NET TV), which was also a private educational television station, Tokyo Channel 12 faced a serious business crisis after its launch due to low ratings. Nikkei, Inc. took over the operation of Tokyo Channel 12 in 1969 and officially converted it into a comprehensive television station in 1973. In 1981, Tokyo Channel 12 was renamed TV Tokyo.

== History ==
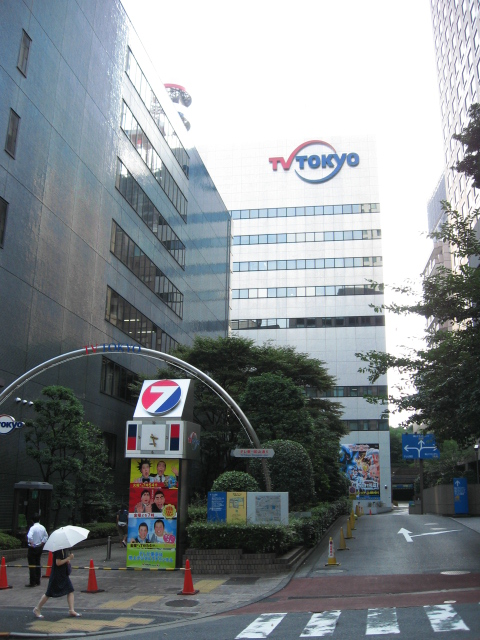
Former headquarters in Toranomon, Minato, Tokyo.

On July 2, 1960, the Japan Science and Technology Promotion Foundation (now Japan Science Foundation) applied to the Ministry of Posts and Telecommunications (MPT) for a television broadcast license for the VHF12 channel returned by the U.S. military stationed in Japan. As part of the license application, the majority of programs were set to be science and technology education programs; the rest were to be general education and news programs. However, after this decision was issued, three other companies participating in the bidding, including Central Educational Broadcasting, raised objections to the Postmaster General, and the debate was not concluded until 1969.

=== 1960s ===
After the Science and Technology Promotion Foundation obtained its broadcasting license, it immediately invited Kurata, then president of Hitachi Production Co., Ltd., to serve as the head of the television business headquarters and began preparations for the launch. At noon on April 12, 1964, Tokyo Channel 12 officially launched (broadcasting as Science TV Tokyo Channel 12 Television (科学テレビ東京12チャンネルテレビ, Kagaku Terebi Tōkyō Jūni-channeru Terebi)); the first program broadcast included "The Birth of Tokyo Channel 12", an NHK Symphony Orchestra concert, the 90-minute TV series "The Shore of Sorrow", and variety shows such as "Good Night 21st Century". On the first day of broadcast, Tokyo Channel 12's average full-day ratings were 2.1%, and the average prime-time ratings were 3.4%. When Tokyo Channel 12 was launched, its main programs were mainly industrial high school lectures, supplemented by news, social education, TV dramas, foreign movies and other programs. During the 1964 Tokyo Olympics, Tokyo Channel 12 paused all but higher education programs for games coverage, broadcasting the longest among the flagship stations.

However, due to the extremely low ratings of Tokyo Channel 12's educational programs (in the first year of its launch, the average daily ratings of Tokyo Channel 12 were only 1% and only 2% during prime time). as well as the Japanese economy being in a securities recession at the time, Tokyo Channel 12 immediately fell into serious operating difficulties. In the first year of broadcasting, it recorded a deficit of 1.38 billion yen. In 1966, Tokyo Channel 12 decided to shorten daily broadcasting to five hours and thirty minutes, and attempts were made to rebuild by requesting donations from powerful financial companies, laying off employees, and suspending advertising business activities. However, Tokyo Channel 12 planned to lay off 200 people. This triggered backlash from the labor union and led to a four-year dispute. In 1967, Tokyo Channel 12 changed its reconstruction plan again, extending the daily broadcast time to 8 hours and 10 minutes, requesting companies in the financial sector to donate funds for reconstruction, and restarting advertising activities. At the same time, four other private TV stations in Tokyo and NHK formed the "Science TV Coordination Committee" to assist in the reconstruction of Tokyo Channel 12 and provide broadcasting parts for the Program. These measures halved the accumulated losses of Tokyo Channel 12 to approximately 1.743 billion yen in 1967. On March 28, 1968, Tokyo Channel 12 began broadcasting color programs.

When the operating conditions of Tokyo Channel 12 were in trouble again in 1968, the Science and Technology Promotion Foundation abandoned the previous method of soliciting donations from the financial sector and instead invited the financial sector to inject capital to rebuild the television department. On July 1 of the same year, twenty companies in the Japanese financial circle—including Mainichi Broadcasting, Hitachi, Ltd., and Nissan Motor Co., Ltd.—invested in the establishment of Tokyo Channel 12 Production Company (Tokyo Twelve Channel Co., Ltd.) with a capital of 1 billion. The Science and Technology Promotion Foundation has the television broadcasting license and facility management rights, while Tokyo Channel 12 Production is responsible for program arrangement, production, and advertising business. As Mainichi Broadcasting invested in the establishment of Tokyo Channel 12 Production Company, a network relationship was actually formed between Tokyo Channel 12 and Mainichi Broadcasting System during this period. Some programs of Tokyo Channel 12 were broadcast in Kinki through Mainichi Broadcasting. In 1969, Tokyo Channel 12 Production once again increased its capital by ¥1 billion, of which Nihon Keizai Shimbun invested ¥600 million, becoming the largest shareholder of Tokyo Channel 12 Production.

=== 1970s ===
In 1970, Tokyo Channel 12 achieved 100% colorization of evening prime-time programs and achieved profitability for the first time in the same year through business activities. On October 24, 1973, Tokyo Channel 12 Production Co., Ltd. changed its company name to Tokyo Channel 12 Co., Ltd. (Tokyo 12 Channel Co., Ltd.), officially taking over the operation of Tokyo Channel 12 from the Science and Technology Promotion Foundation. On November 1 of the same year, as the MPT abolished the educational television license in the Keihin area, Tokyo Channel 12 was officially transformed into a comprehensive television station, and the program broadcast ratio was changed to 20% of educational programs, 30% of educational programs, and other programs 50%. In March 1975, due to Mainichi Broadcasting joining JNN as a result of an affiliation switch, Tokyo Channel 12 terminated its relationship with Mainichi Broadcasting and strengthened cooperation with Kinki local independent stations Sun Television and Kinki Broadcasting.

In October 1977 Tokyo Channel 12 Production was renamed Tokyo Channel 12, Ltd. (株式会社東京12チャンネル, Kabushiki-gaisha Tōkyō Jūni-channeru); and shortened the channel's name to Tokyo Channel 12 (東京12チャンネル, Tōkyō Jūni-channeru), dropping "Science TV" from its name. At the same time, the station moved to Shiba Park. A month later, it became a general-purpose TV station along with NET. On April 1, 1978, Tokyo launched a new production company, Softx.

=== 1980s ===
In 1981, it was again renamed, this time to Television Tokyo Channel 12, Ltd. d/b/a TV Tokyo; the current Japanese name of the company was also assumed in the same year.

In 1983, TV Tokyo formed the Mega TON Network (now TX Network) with TV Osaka, and Aichi Television Broadcasting. The company shifted its head offices from Shiba Park to Toranomon in December 1985.

=== 1990s to present ===
Logo used from 1998 to 2023.

Current English logo, used for international operations.

On October 4, 1999, TV Tokyo's production company Softx was absorbed into TV Tokyo MediaNet. In 2004, TV Tokyo MediaNet was shortened to MediaNet. On June 25, 2004, the company assumed its current English name, TV Tokyo Corporation, following its initial public offering. After the digital transition, the channel began broadcasting on digital channel 7. On November 7, 2016, TV Tokyo moved its headquarters to the new building at Sumitomo Fudosan Roppongi Grand Tower from its old studios in Toranomon. The network initially used a Circle 7-style logo from 2003, when digital broadcasts began. The station mascot is a cartoon banana with eyes, a nose, and a mouth which is bent into a 7, named Nanana (ナナナ).

== See also ==
- Television in Japan
- AT-X
