= TX Network =

Japanese television network

TXN Network
- Type: Broadcast television network
- Country: Japan
- Founded: September 1, 1983 (as the Megalopolis Tokyo-Osaka-Okayama-Nagoya Network (Mega TON))
- Owner: Nikkei, Inc. (owns shares outstanding in every member station)
- Parent: TV Tokyo
- Former names: Mega TON Network
- Affiliates: TV Tokyo and others; see #List of stations
- Official website: https://www.tv-tokyo.co.jp/kaisha/company/network.html

TXN Network (TXN) is a commercial television network in Japan owned by TV Tokyo Corporation, a subsidiary of TV Tokyo Holdings, which itself is majority controlled by Nikkei, Inc. The "TX" is taken from the callsign of its flagship station, TV Tokyo. It is also known as TV Tokyo Network.

== Overview ==
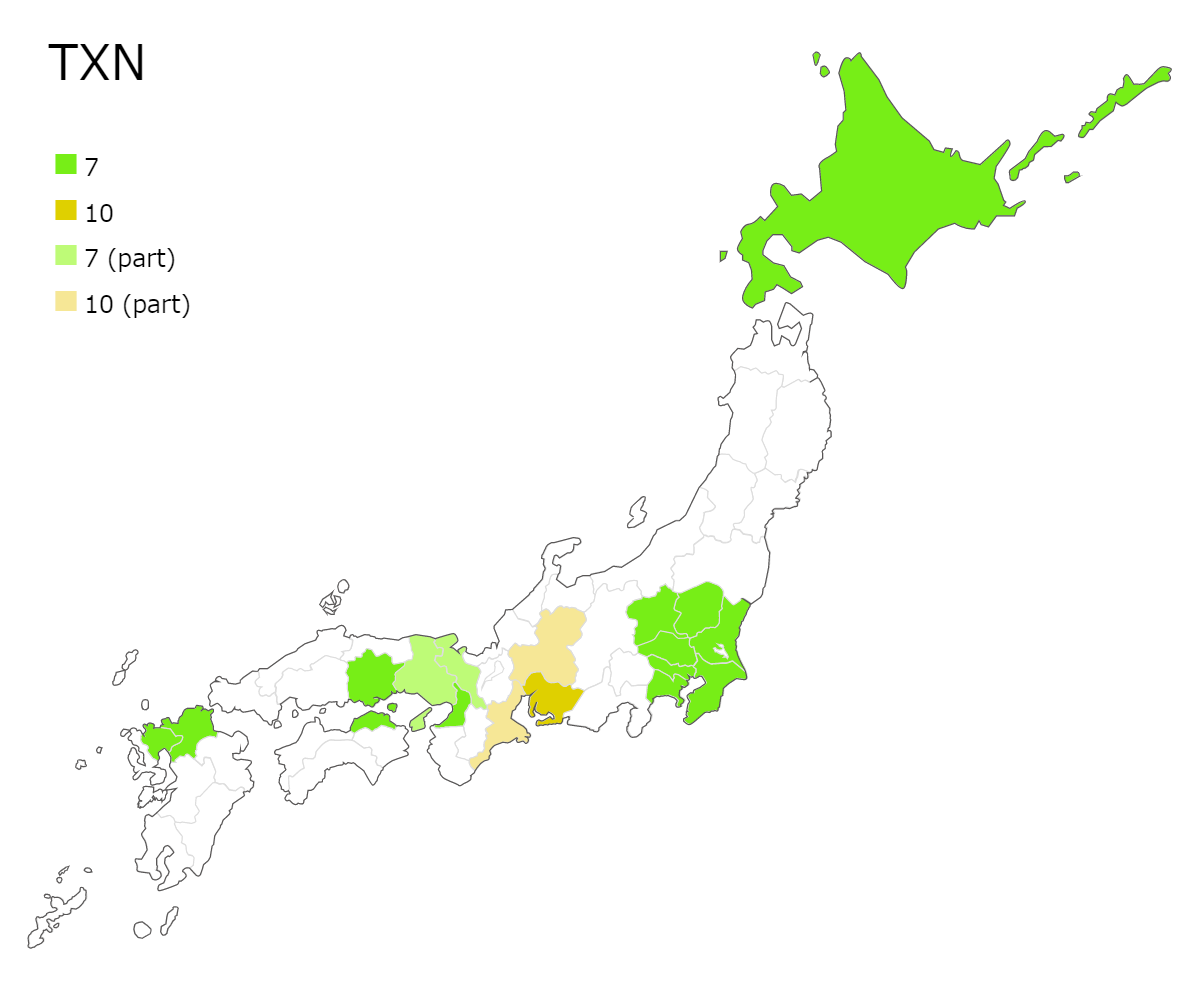
LCN assignments of TXN affiliates

It is named "TXN" because of the call sign of TV Tokyo, its key station, JOTX-DTV. The official name of the network is "TXN Network", and its abbreviation is "TXNN", with the "N" part intentionally duplicated with "Network", or it could also be News and Nationwide due to ambiguous meanings. There is no official explanation about the meaning. For that reason, it is sometimes called by various aliases such as TX Network, TV Tokyo Network, TV Tokyo keiretsu, and TXN keiretsu.

Unlike other networks, it is a network that has not been distinguished from news networks, program supply networks, and network organizations since the era of the former name (described later) "Mega TON Network".

Also, before TXN was officially launched, there were secondary affiliations with other stations. Chukyo Television in the complex network era and Mainichi Broadcasting in the era before the affiliation change correspond to this. First of all, the former was initially based on TV Asahi, but the Chunichi Shimbun invests in the principle of eliminating concentration. Since it was not possible to do so, it was decided to receive investment from Nihon Keizai Shimbun, so there was a network relationship with Tokyo 12 Channel → TV Tokyo. Chukyo TV subsequently joined NNN in April 1973, then NNS and became a full Nippon Television affiliated station, but until the opening of TV Aichi in 1983, partly with three other wide-area stations (Chubu Nippon Broadcasting, Tokai Television, Nagoya Television), TV Tokyo were broadcast in the form of program sales. Next, the latter was mainly NET after the establishment of the Federation of Five Companies in 1960, but in 1968 the Japan Science and Technology Foundation fell into a management crisis. At that time, Mainichi Broadcasting invested in "Tokyo 12 Channel Production", which is a broadcast program production company. Broadcast TV) continued the cross-net station until the net change. After that, Mainichi Broadcasting moved to the TBS affiliation station due to the network change, but from the remnants of the swap era, even after the transition to TBS, Tokyo 12 Channel → Listed as a major shareholder of TV Tokyo, and is still listed in the top 10 major shareholders of TV Tokyo Holdings. Conversely, programs produced by Mainichi Broadcasting were sometimes broadcast on TV Tokyo only in the Kanto region (such as "Fortune Quest L"). Since TXN was officially launched on April 1, 1989, there have been no crossnet stations with other affiliates.

The stations affiliated with TXN are all TV stations.

The TXN network is one of Japan's five major commercial networks that does not have a page for breaking news.

== History ==
Tokyo Channel 12 almost went into bankruptcy in 1968. At the time, a television production company was established, with two companies, business newspaper Nihon Keizai Shimbun and the Mainichi Broadcasting System having a central role in the investment. At this time, MBS was affiliated to NET TV (now TV Asahi), which carried out a "key station declaration" at the request of Nikkei, in the form of cross-networking with Tokyo Channel 12 and NET, in October 1969. Both channels either signed a network, or launched a co-production program, by, for example, each other to supply the programs from both stations, to strengthen the relationship. However, the relationship involving MBS and Tokyo Channel 12 disappeared on March 31, 1975, when MBS and ABC swapped their affiliations. Tokyo Channel 12 became an independent channel and remained that way until the start of the 80s.

Then, on March 1, 1982, TV Osaka (TVO) became the first affiliate stations of what came to be TV Tokyo's network of stations. The new network was named Mega TON Network. Although "Mega TON" initially stood for "Megalopolis Tokyo-Osaka Network", the "N" also meant Nagoya, where a third station was planned. TV Aichi (TVA) began broadcasting on September 1, 1983. Also, the "Megalopolis Song Festival" was once broadcast featuring the name of the network.

On October 1, 1985, a fourth station covering Okayama and Kagawa (the Setouchi quasi-Wide Area), named TV Setouchi (TSC), started broadcasting. However, the name Mega TON Network continued to be used, as it also meant "T" for Takamatsu and "O" for Okayama, after their respective capitals.

Because of the expansion, the network changed names on April 1, 1989, to TXN Network (TXN). The catchphrase at the time was "Can you feel your hot heartbeat?". In connection with the changes, the name "TV Tokyo Network" was also used in magazines at the time, but "TXN Network" was also used in TV commercials. At the same time as the birth of the new network, the popular name "TX" was officially established as an abbreviation (derived from TV Tokyo's call sign JOTX-TV). At the same time, TV Tokyo gained the TX abbreviation from the station's calls. Television Hokkaido in Hokkaido and TVQ Kyushu Broadcasting in Fukuoka began broadcasting in 1989 and 1991, respectively. The network gained their current shape of six stations.

== List of stations ==
Stations are listed mostly in Japanese order of prefectures which is mirrored in ISO 3166-2:JP, with exceptions for the Kantō region, Aichi-Gifu-Mie, Kansai region (except Mie) and Okayama-Kagawa, which form single wide broadcasting markets respectively.

Broadcasting area(s)		Station			LCN	RF	Start date of broadcast	Date of affiliation	Note(s)
Prefecture	Region	On air branding	Abbr.	Call sign	LCN	RF	Start date of broadcast	Date of affiliation	Note(s)
Hokkaidō		TV Hokkaidō	TVh	JOHI-DTV	7	14	1 October 1989	1 October 1989	Core station
Kantō region		TV Tokyo	TX	JOTX-DTV	7	23	12 April 1964	1 March 1982	Eastern flagship station; core station
Aichi	Chūbu	TV Aichi	TVA	JOCI-DTV	10	23	1 September 1983	1 September 1983	Core station
Osaka	Kansai	TV Osaka	TVO	JOBH-DTV	7	18	1 March 1982	1 March 1982	Western flagship station; core station
Okayama	Chūgoku	TV Setouchi	TSC	JOPH-DTV	7	18	1 October 1985	1 October 1985	
Kagawa	Shikoku	TV Setouchi	TSC	JOPH-DTV	7	18	1 October 1985	1 October 1985	
Fukuoka	Kyūshū	TVQ Kyushu Broadcasting	TVQ	JOTY-DTV	7	26	1 April 1991	1 April 1991	Core station

=== Areas without a TXN station ===
There is no affiliate in the Tohoku, mostly of Chubu and Kansai, mostly of Shikoku and Chugoku, mostly in Kyushu and Okinawa regions. In prefectures without a TXN station, a selection of TV Tokyo programs are syndicated to other stations in the prefecture.

== Expansion plans ==
TXN faces difficulties to expand nationwide, especially in the prefectures of Miyagi, Niigata, Shizuoka, Kyoto, Hyogo, Hiroshima, and Kumamoto, which have ordinance-designated cities, and even now there are no affiliated stations. Also, among the ordinance-designated cities belonging to those prefectures, Shimizu Ward, Shizuoka City is covered by TV Tokyo, Hamamatsu City is covered by TV Aichi, and in many areas between Kyoto City, Kobe City, and Hanshin, Hyogo Prefecture, viewers can receive TV Osaka directly or via cable television, and in the western part of Kobe City viewers can receive TV Setouchi directly, but in other areas it is impossible to receive the broadcasts of TXN affiliated stations.

=== 5-prefecture expansion plan ===
At the president's regular press conference on May 31, 2007, the goal was to complete the following in advance to the transition to digital terrestrial broadcasting on July 24, 2011:

- Opening a new station in Miyagi Prefecture or expanding the detached area of TV Tokyo
- Opening a new station in Hiroshima Prefecture or expanding the area of TV Setouchi, an existing affiliated station in neighboring prefectures
- Opening a new station in Shizuoka Prefecture or expanding the area of TV Tokyo or TV Aichi, which are affiliated stations in neighboring prefectures
- Expand the broadcasting area of TV Osaka, an existing affiliated station in neighboring prefectures to Kyoto and Hyogo prefectures.

However, this was an example commented by Sadahiko Sugaya, the then-president of TV Tokyo, and was not officially approved as a business plan.

The company's governance announced plans to achieve these goals. However, this was a mere suggestion by Sugaya, and was never implemented officially as a business plan.

In an overview of the 40th Annual General Meeting of Shareholders on TV Tokyo held on June 20, 2008, the company responded that it was "difficult in the current business environment" regarding the expansion of the area that can be seen, and since then it has not shown any new movements.

=== Direct reception and distribution by cable TV ===
The 6 TXN affiliated stations are broadcast only in 13 prefectures, but even outside the target area (including some areas that are within the broadcast target area of the TXN affiliated station but are outside the broadcasting area) directly with a para stack antenna etc. Many households are watching TXN affiliated broadcasting stations, by methods such as spillover reception. In Kinki and Tokai, since before the opening of affiliated stations TV Osaka and TV Aichi, there is a mutual network relationship with independent prefectural regional stations in neighboring prefectures, so the consent of the local independent prefectural regional stations could not be obtained. There are stations that do not distribute cable TV due to technical reasons such as difficult reception from relay points, such as Hida in Gifu Prefecture, and Iga and Kumano in Mie Prefecture.

=== TX availability status ===
TX has the same number of relay stations as NHK and the four leading wide-area commercial broadcasting stations in Tokyo, including the islands of Tokyo. In the Tokyo Channel 12 era, there were fewer relay stations than the starting station because there were no latecomers, educational stations, or affiliated stations.

Outside the area, viewers in most of Yamanashi Prefecture, a part of the eastern part of Shizuoka Prefecture, almost the eastern half of Nagano Prefecture, a small part of Niigata Prefecture, and a small part of Fukushima Prefecture can receive TX directly or by subscribing to cable television.

=== Kinki area ===
TV Osaka exists (broadcasting stations) in a wide area, but only Osaka Prefecture is the service area due to the balance between terrestrial independent TV stations in surrounding prefectures (especially KBS Kyoto and Sun Television) and the four leading wide-area broadcasters. A frequency was assigned as a prefectural broadcasting station. For this reason, there were many areas in Osaka where radio waves from the transmitting station on Mt. Ikoma could not be heard, so multiple independent relay stations were installed in Osaka.

There are areas where it can be received directly or by rebroadcasting outside the area (Kyoto, Nara, Hyogo, Tokushima (designated as a special area)), but Wakayama Prefecture did not obtain the consent of TV Wakayama, It was not received in all areas from the analog era, and Shiga Prefecture was also received in some areas during the analog era, but it was discontinued due to technical problems after the complete abolition of analog broadcasting.

=== Chukyo area ===
Television Aichi also has a broadcasting station in the wider area, but due to the balance between the surrounding prefecture's independent terrestrial television station (Gifu-chan, Mie TV) and the four leading wide-area broadcasting commercial broadcasters, only Aichi Prefecture is the service area. A frequency was assigned as a prefectural broadcasting station. However, the actual viewing area of TV Aichi accounts for 93% (household ratio) of the Chukyo metropolitan area including Aichi Prefecture, as well as part of the Hamamatsu metropolitan area in Shizuoka Prefecture, part of the Ina region in Nagano Prefecture, and very little in Shiga Prefecture. Viewing outside the area is possible in some areas.

=== Hokkaido ===
Unlike the other four affiliated stations (Hokkaido Broadcasting (TBS affiliate), Sapporo Television Broadcasting (Nippon Television affiliate), Hokkaido Television Broadcasting (TV Asahi affiliate), Hokkaido Cultural Broadcasting (Fuji Television affiliate)), the entire east of Hokkaido (Tokachi/Okhotsk, Kushiro and Nemuro) and some other areas did not receive it.

Television Hokkaido opened in October 1989, starting with the central Hokkaido area (parts of Sapporo, Otaru, and Tomakomai), and then starting with parts of Asahikawa, Muroran, and Hakodate (in these areas, terrestrial digital transmission stations and relay stations began to broadcast the station's digital signal from 2006 to 2007), and the aim was to establish a prefecture-wide network (development of relay stations = viewing in most of Hokkaido) by 10 years after the opening of the station.

However, due to sluggish sales due to economic deterioration in Hokkaido such as the collapse of the bubble economy, the cost of installing relay stations weighed heavily, and in 1998 the Ministry of Posts and Telecommunications at the time decided to shift to terrestrial digital broadcasting. Canceled relay station opening. Even after that, the area expansion did not materialize until 2010, when the system of the "relay station development support project accompanying the transition to terrestrial digital broadcasting" (hereinafter referred to as the support scheme) under the jurisdiction of the Ministry of Internal Affairs and Communications was established. Due to this effect, for example, in Obihiro and Kushiro, before the transmission stations opened in 2011, viewers in these cities were forced to rely on cable television for TVh programming. For this reason, in the program schedules of newspapers published in Hokkaido, in areas where there are no relay stations, there is a warning that TVh cannot be received in some areas.

After that, from August to November 2011 after the complete transition to terrestrial digital broadcasting, transmitting stations in Abashiri, Obihiro and Kushiro (Abashiri Transmitting Station, Obihiro Transmitting Station, Kushiro Transmitting Station), and relay stations in Kitami (Kitami Relay Station) were set up. Starting with the opening of the station, the installation of relay stations progressed, and due to the support scheme and the support of local governments in the relay station area, both analog and digital could not be viewed from October to December 2014. Broadcasts began in most areas of the Soya General Promotion Bureau, including Wakkanai, and the Nemuro Promotion Bureau, which had been unviewable until the end, began December 2015 Although some unopened relay stations (Honbetsu and Honbetsuzawa) remain, the entire Hokkaido network has finally been practically completed 26 years after its opening in 1989. The Shibecha Rururan station in Kushiro also began rebroadcasting TVh on March 31, 2016.

Direct reception is also possible in some areas along the Tsugaru Strait in Aomori Prefecture. Kazamaura Village rebroadcasts digital broadcasts outside the area through the Kazamaura Village Public Listening System. In addition, Aomori Cable TV in Aomori City was rebroadcasting outside the area until the end of broadcasting on July 24, 2011, only for analog broadcasting (transmitting video from Sapporo headquarters via optical fiber line), but on March 1, 2016, the company began rebroadcasting TVh's digital signal for the first time in about four and a half years (for the time being, it will be broadcast in the form of a test broadcast).

=== Okayama Prefecture, Kagawa Prefecture, Fukuoka Prefecture ===
TV Setouchi and TVQ Kyushu Broadcasting also have fewer relay stations than the original stations, so there were many difficult viewing areas within the broadcasting target area for analog broadcasting. However, in 2010 TVQ achieved virtually 100% coverage of the entire Fukuoka prefecture. In addition, since the neighboring Saga Prefecture has only one commercial TV station in the prefecture, Saga TV, it was designated as a special area like Tokushima Prefecture, so all commercial TV stations in Fukuoka, including TVQ, are available on all cable TV companies in the prefecture. In addition, it can be viewed directly in western Yamaguchi Prefecture, almost all of Oita Prefecture, and part of Nagasaki Prefecture by direct reception or rebroadcast outside the area. However, in Kumamoto Prefecture, direct reception is possible in a small area such as Arao City, and rebroadcasting outside the area is not performed throughout the area without the consent of the local station.

On the other hand, regarding TV Setouchi, although there are areas where digital broadcasting has started, there are still areas under consideration or not applicable, so it is unclear whether all areas will be covered. However, there are some areas where it is difficult to hear. Unlike TV Hokkaido, the installation of a relay station for a new digital station using support schemes is undecided at this time, except for the Mimasaka relay station that opened on April 20, 2012. However, there are many households that can watch it if it is a cable TV station. In addition, direct reception or rebroadcast outside the area of Cable TV in the Harimanada coast of Hyogo Prefecture, the northern part of Tokushima Prefecture, the Toyo region of Ehime Prefecture, the Bingo region of Hiroshima Prefecture, the majority of Tottori Prefecture, and some areas of eastern Shimane Prefecture [Note 33] It is possible to watch Setouchi on TV.

=== Balance between expansion of viewable area and program sales ===
As mentioned above, the viewing range of TXN (affiliated stations) is limited, so in areas where there are no affiliated stations, TXN affiliated programs may be broadcast at different times from other affiliated stations in each region due to program sales. It will be broadcast on BS TV Tokyo. Most of the program sales are time-lag broadcasts in consideration of sales destinations outside the TXN affiliated stations, but some live broadcast programs such as news programs and sports broadcasts are simulcast. In addition, due to restrictions on terrestrial digital broadcasting on CATV (in principle prohibiting rebroadcasting outside the area), it is possible that program sales to non-TXN affiliated broadcasting stations, which had been on a downward trend due to that, will increase, so for TXN affiliated stations There is also a point that income from number sales increases and there is a big merit.

However, music (especially enka-related) programs, except for the co-produced program "Enka Hanamichi", are mostly not broadcast due to rights issues with related organizations, and in recent years, not only music programs but also variety programs. With almost no broadcast, the ratio of terrestrial programs has fallen from the initial 70% to less than 50%, and the ratio of original programs (including joint production with TV Tokyo), foreign dramas, and TV shopping is increasing.
