= Hiroko Tabuchi =

American journalist

- Born: Kobe
- Occupation: Journalist

Hiroko Tabuchi is a climate journalist who has reported from Japan and the United States, and is known for her coverage of the Fukushima Daiichi nuclear disaster in 2011 and its aftermath. She has worked for The New York Times since 2008, and previously written for The Wall Street Journal and the Tokyo bureau of the Associated Press. She was the member of a team of reporters that won a Pulitzer Prize in 2013 and a team that was finalist in 2011.

== Early life ==
Tabuchi is originally from Kobe, Japan. She received her undergraduate degree from the London School of Economics and Political Science.

== Career ==
Though based in New York, Tabuchi spent a significant portion of her career working in Tokyo, Japan. She has previously written for The Wall Street Journal and the Tokyo bureau of the Associated Press.

She has worked for The New York Times from 2008 to 2017 as a business reporter. Since 2017, she has worked as a Climate and Environment Reporter for the NYT.

She has also contributed to New York Public Radio on several occasions on topics ranging from nuclear meltdown to significant mechanical failures from major car brands. She has also contributed to The World, The Independent, and several other international publications.

== Awards and honors ==
According to The New York Times, Tabuchi was "part of the team awarded the Pulitzer Prize for Explanatory Reporting" in 2013, and "part of a team whose coverage of the tsunami and nuclear disaster in Japan was named a finalist for the Pulitzer Prize for international reporting" in 2011.

In 2018, she was one of the team of New York Times journalists who won the John B Oakes Award for her contribution to reporting on the Environmental Protection Agency under the Trump administration.

She was also the winner of the National Press Foundation Innovative Storyteller Award in 2020, in part for having "led the coverage of the 2011 nuclear disaster in Japan" for The New York Times. In 2021, she was part of a team that won the SABEW award for reporting on the destruction of the Amazon rainforest.
