= Shiodome =

Area in Minato, Tokyo, Japan

Coordinates: 35°39′46.00″N 139°45′35.45″E

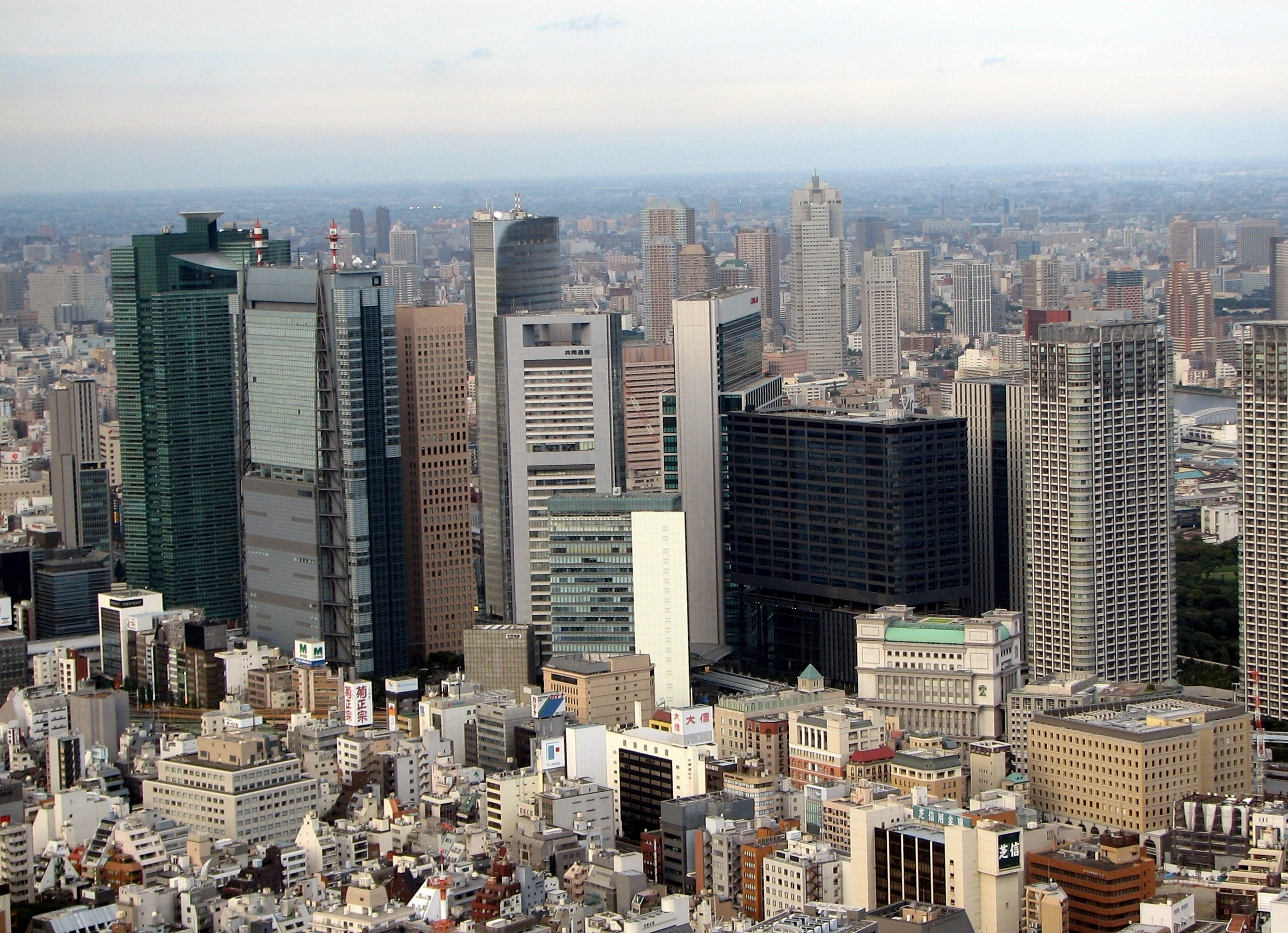
Shiodome skyline in 2006

Shiodome (汐留) is an area in Minato, Tokyo, Japan, located adjacent to Shinbashi and Ginza, near Tokyo Bay and the Hamarikyu Gardens. Formerly a railway terminal, Shiodome has been transformed into one of Tokyo's most modern areas. It is a collection of 11 smaller town districts or cooperative zones, but generally there are three main areas:

- The Shiodome Sio-Site (シオサイト), a collection of skyscrapers containing mostly businesses, hotels, and restaurants. Its thirteen skyscrapers house the headquarters of All Nippon Airways, Dentsu, Fujitsu, JSR, Mitsui Chemicals, Nippon Express, Nippon TV, Sega Sammy Holdings and Softbank.
- The western district, located west of the JR tracks and populated by European-style buildings.
- The southern extension, east of the JR tracks from Hamamatsucho 1-chome. This area is for residential use, and there are three tall apartment buildings located there, along with a small park.

Shiodome Station is a stop on the Yurikamome and Toei Ōedo Line; the complex is also within walking distance of Shimbashi Station.

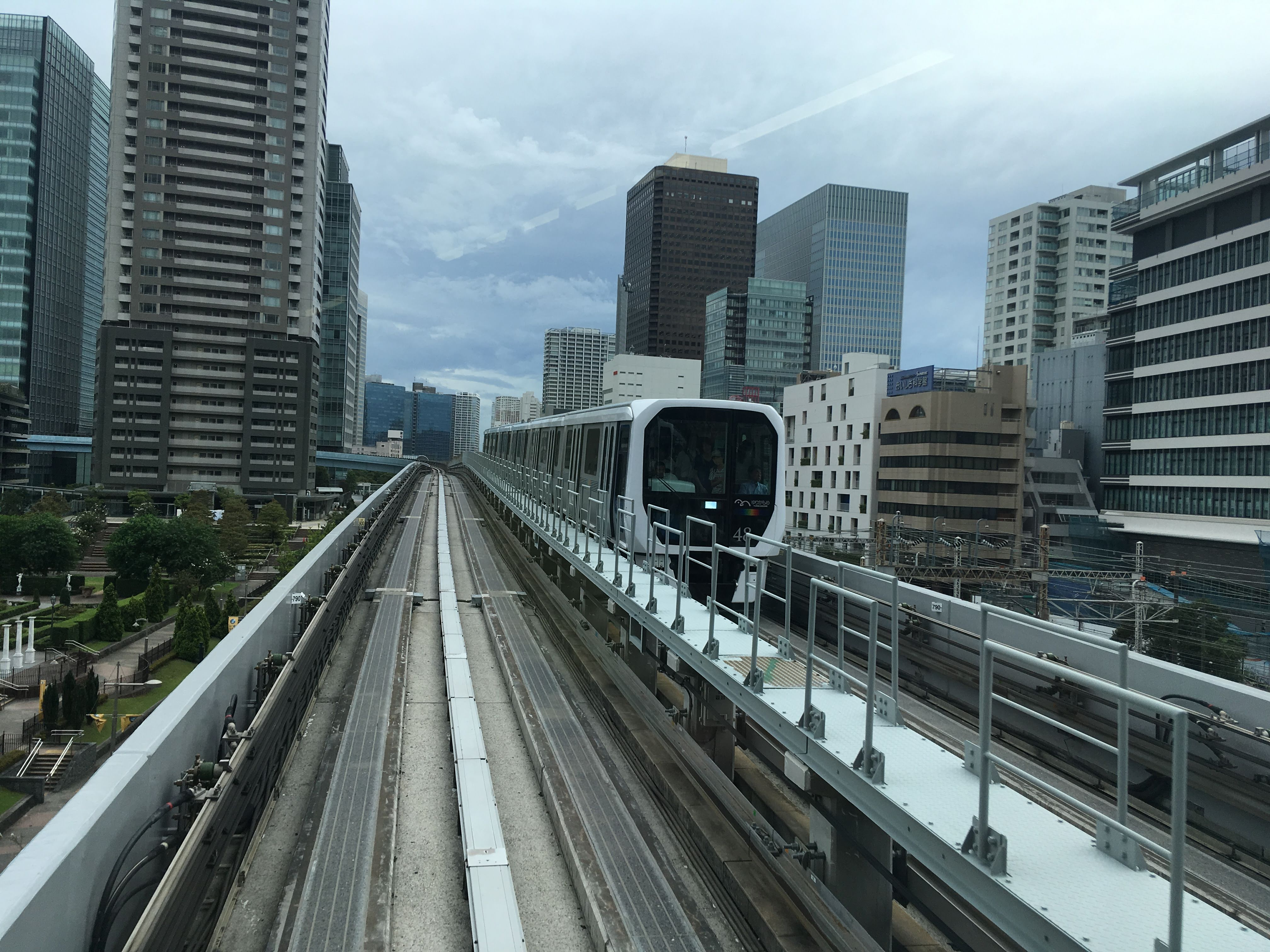
Yurikamome in Shiodome.

== History ==
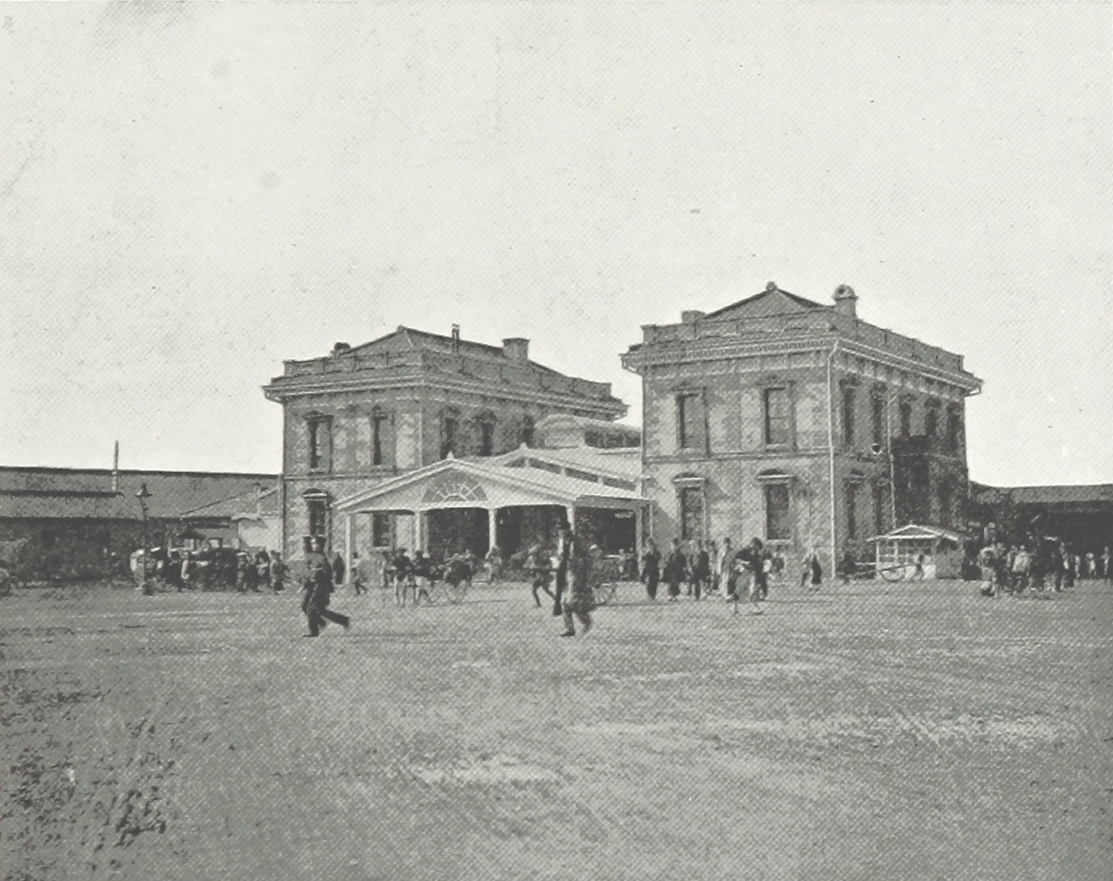
The original Shimbashi Station in the late 19th century

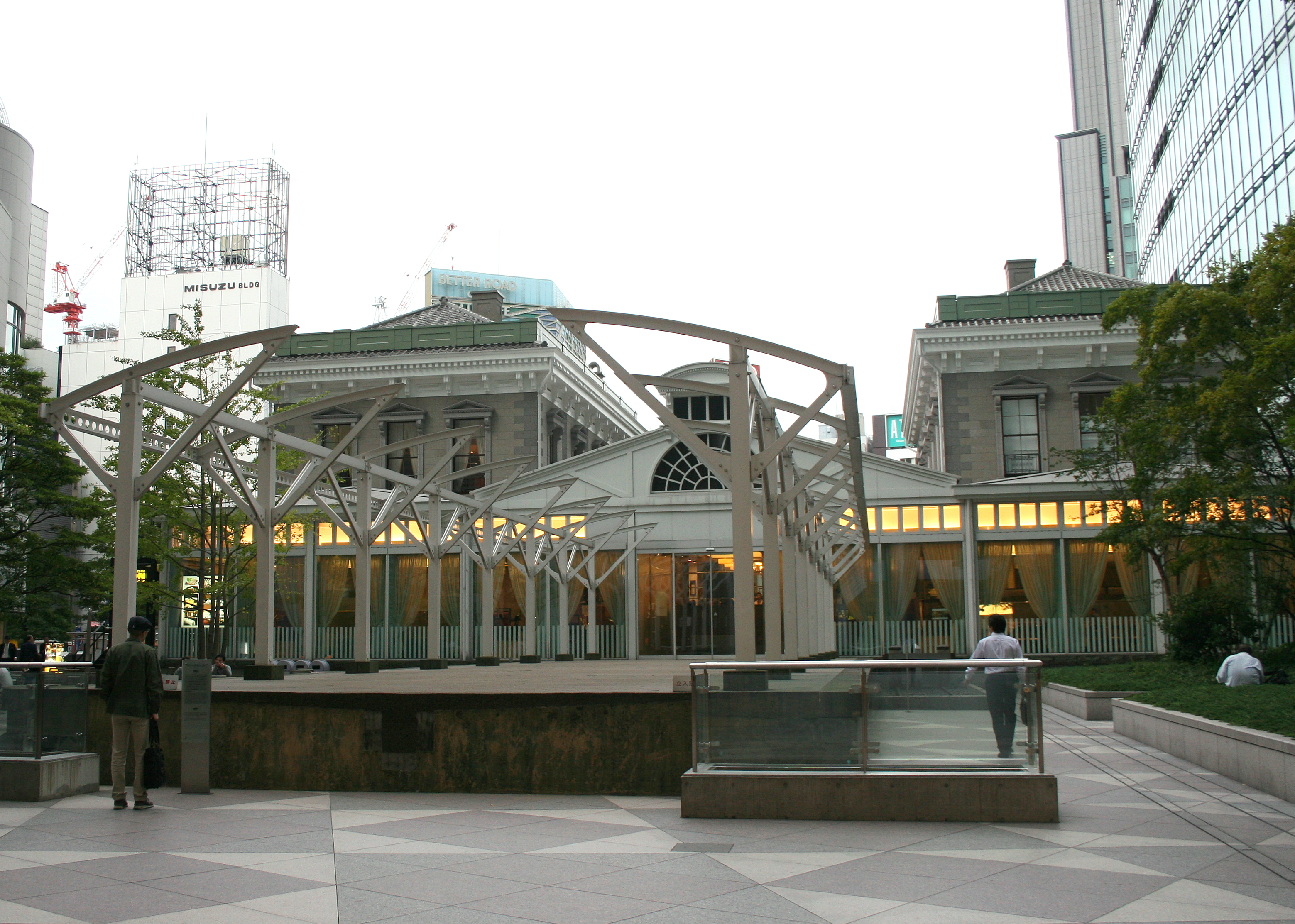
Restored platform of the original Shimbashi Station

Like its neighbors Ginza and Tsukiji, Shiodome is built on what was originally marshland on the shore of Tokyo Bay. Shōgun Tokugawa Ieyasu issued an order in 1603 to fill in the area, and throughout the Edo period Shiodome housed the local residences of various daimyō (feudal lords). The name Shiodome, which translates to "keeping out the tide", probably referred to the shōgun's desire to isolate Edo Castle (now the Imperial Palace) from Tokyo Bay. There was a Shiodome River but it has been largely filled in. A small portion of the river remains on the west side of Hamarikyu Gardens. A water bus used to service the river.

Following the Meiji Restoration, the new Imperial government expropriated the daimyo-held lands in Shiodome to build Shimbashi Station (新橋停車場, Shinbashi Teishajō). This served as the Tokyo terminus of the Tōkaidō Main Line, the first railway in Japan, from 1872 until 1914. In 1914, the line was extended to Tokyo Station, the passenger terminal at Shiodome was closed down, and Karasumori Station on the Yamanote Line was renamed Shimbashi Station.

Shiodome Freight Terminal remained the primary freight yard for Tokyo through World War II, despite extensive damage from the Great Kanto earthquake which destroyed the original passenger terminal. The 1936 opening of the Tokyo Metropolitan Central Wholesale Market in nearby Tsukiji increased the terminal's importance in the Tokyo distribution network.

The development of expressways in Japan after the war lessened the importance of rail freight. Shiodome Station was officially closed in October 1987, shortly following the privatization of Japan National Railways. The abandoned 22 hectare (54.36 acre) facility, one of the largest open plots of land in central Tokyo, was transferred to the JNR Settlement Corporation in 1988 and earmarked for sale in order to discharge remaining JNR liabilities.

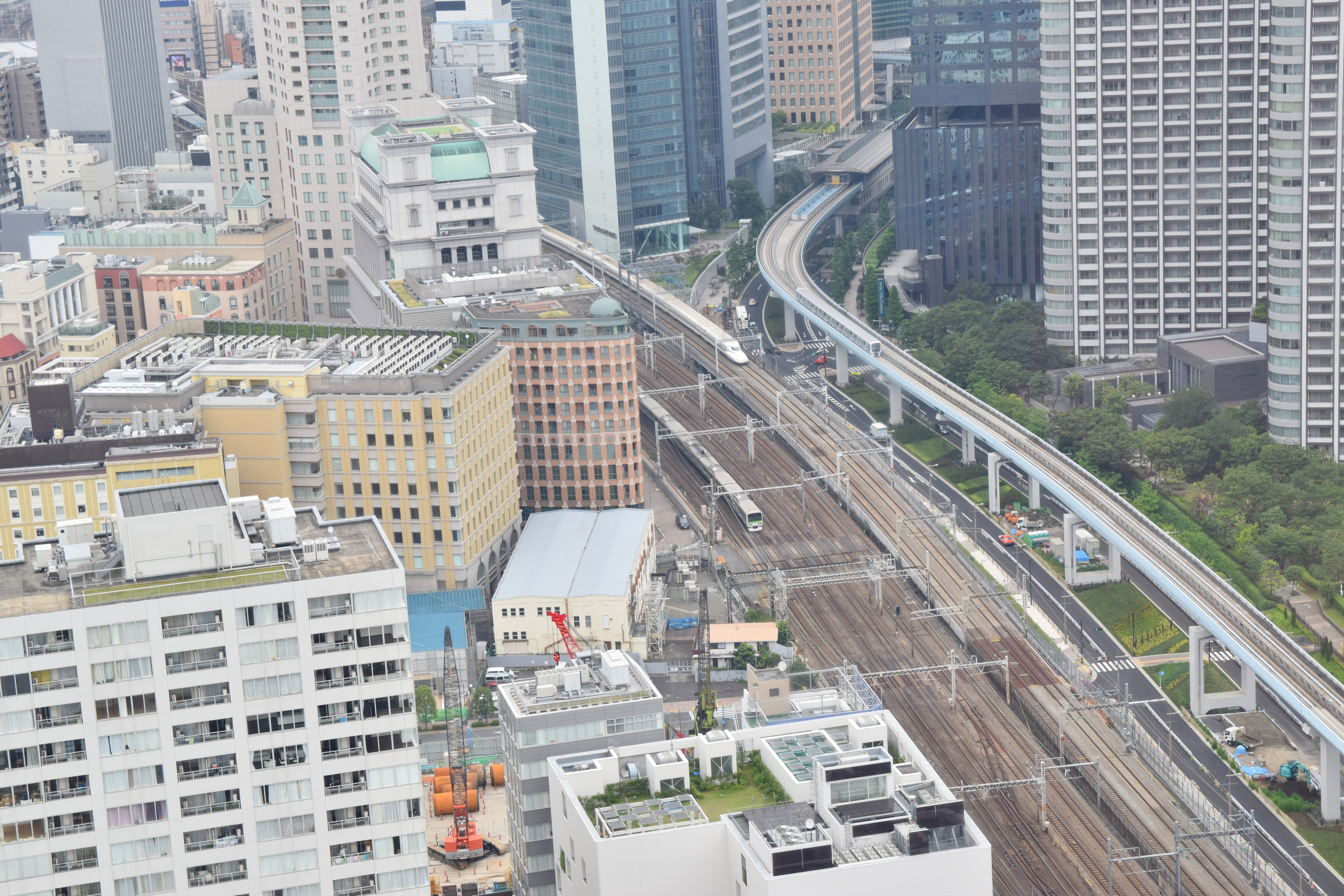
Shiodome railway tracks

The Japanese government and Tokyo Metropolitan Government held various review sessions between 1984 and 1995 before settling on a redevelopment plan. Under this plan, thirteen skyscrapers were built in Shiodome, as well as a number of smaller buildings, resulting in a new urban center. The old Shimbashi Station has also been rebuilt as a monument, although it is not operational.

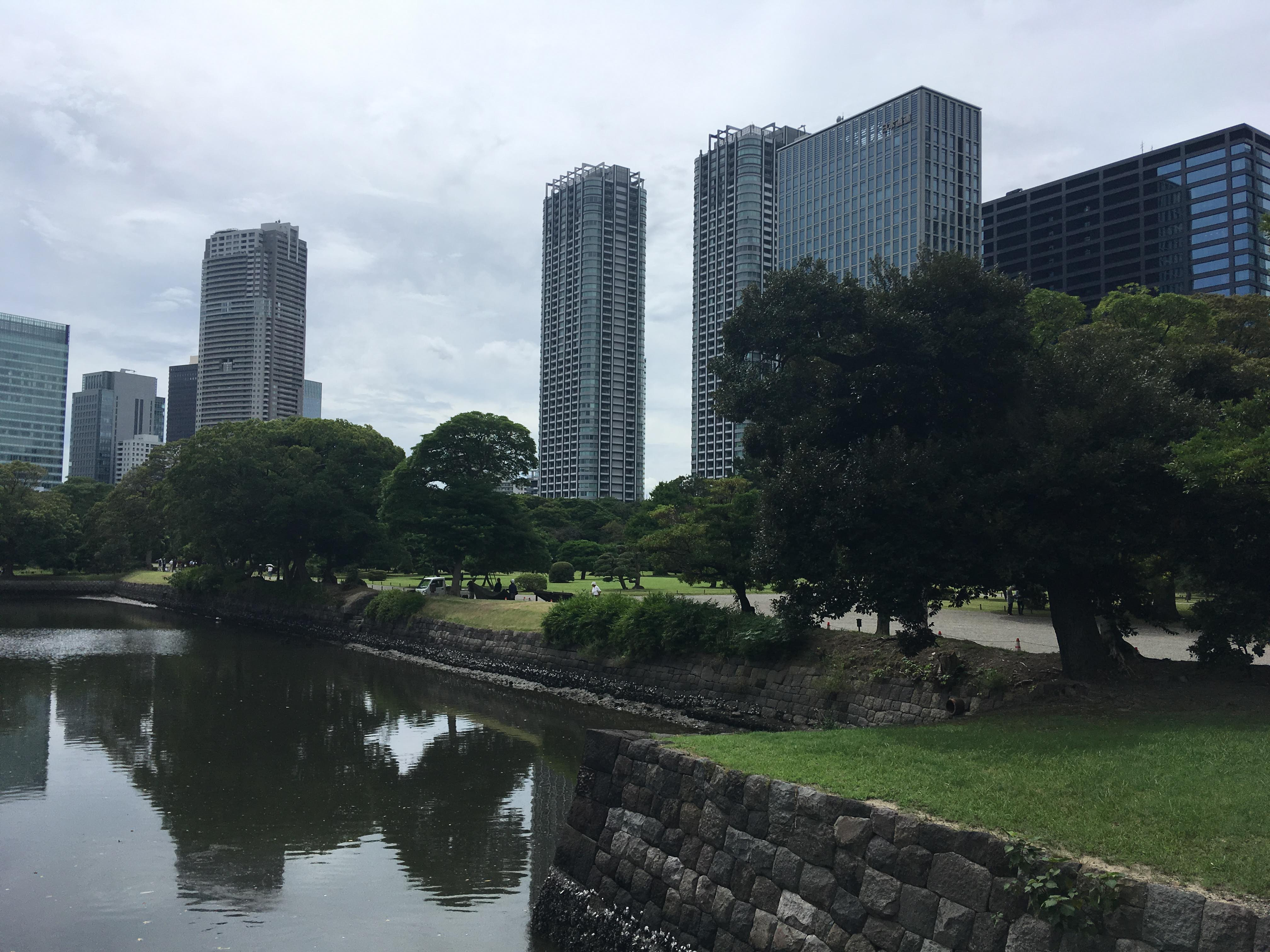
Hama-rikyū Gardens in Shiodome.

== Buildings ==
Major high-rise developments in Shiodome include:

- Acty Shiodome (190.25 m): Japan's tallest condominium tower, developed by the Urban Renaissance Agency.
- Dentsu Building (213.34 m)
- Nittele Tower (198.2 m)
- Shiodome City Center (215.75 m): Corporate headquarters of All Nippon Airways and formerly Fujitsu
- Shiodome Sumitomo Building (126.41 m): Corporate headquarters of JSR and Sega Sammy Holdings, contains the Hotel Villa Fontaine Shiodome.
- Tokyo Shiodome Building (173.2 m): Corporate headquarters of Softbank and several major subsidiaries; upper floors house the Conrad Tokyo hotel.
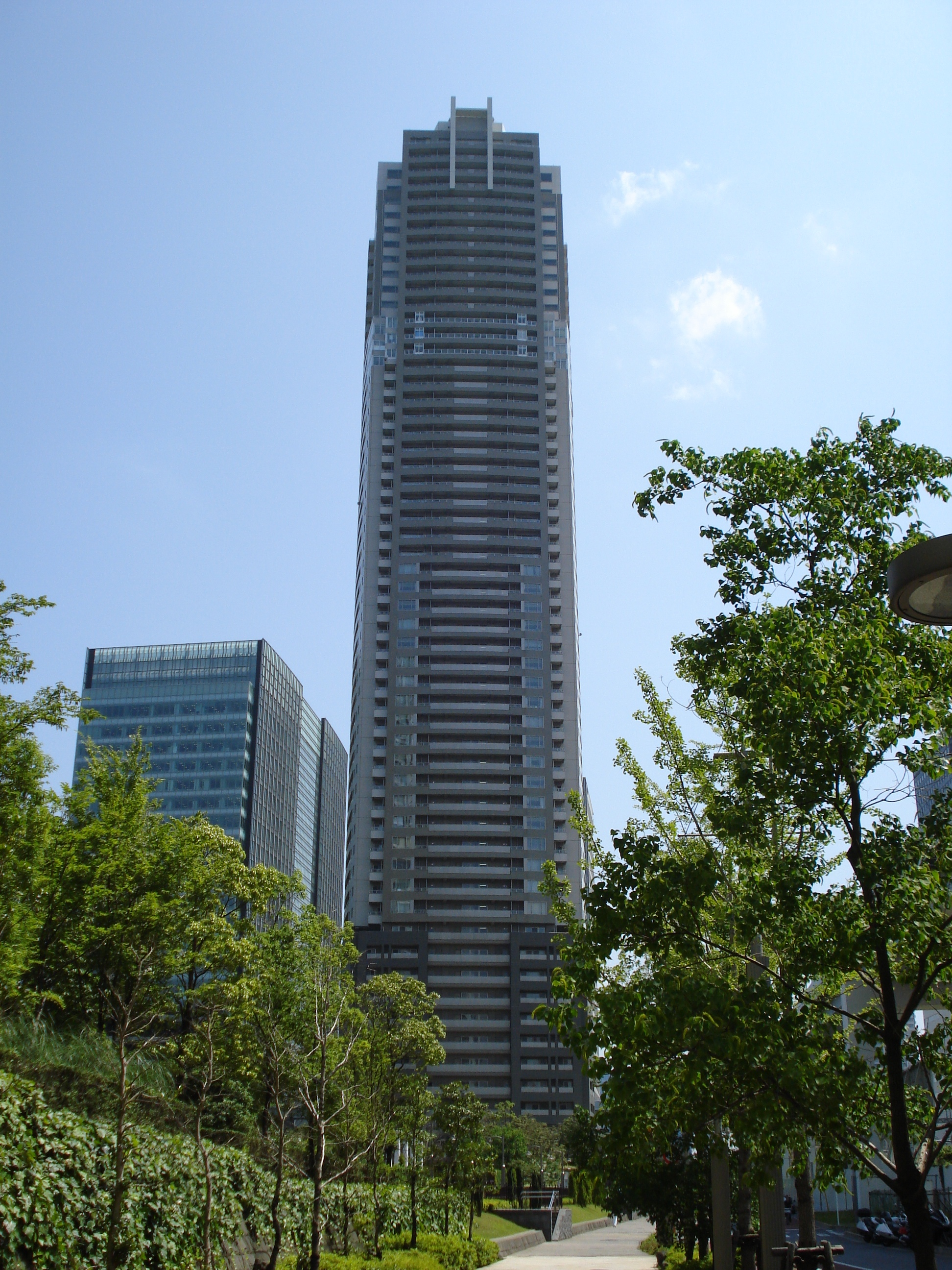
Acty Shiodome

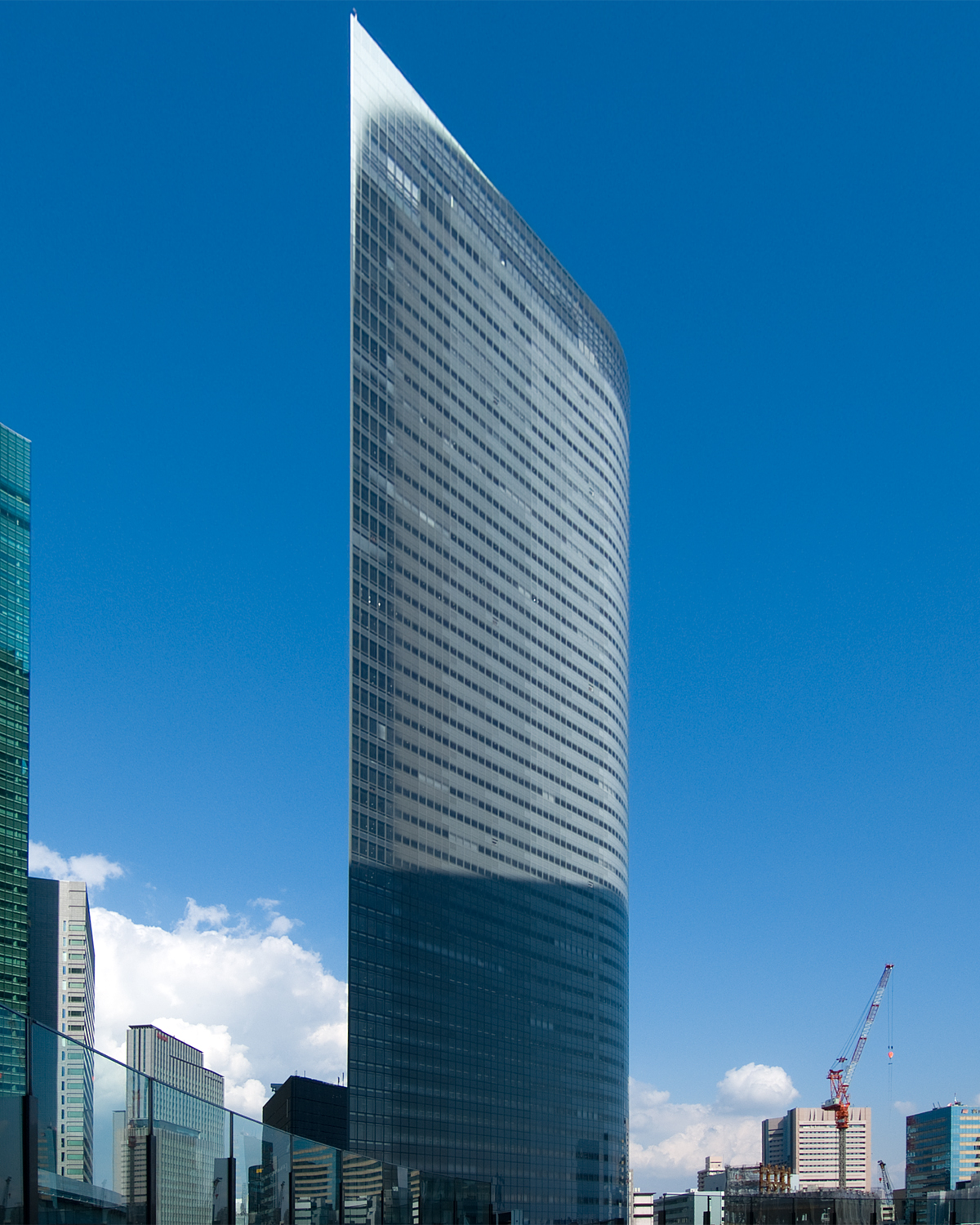
Dentsu Building

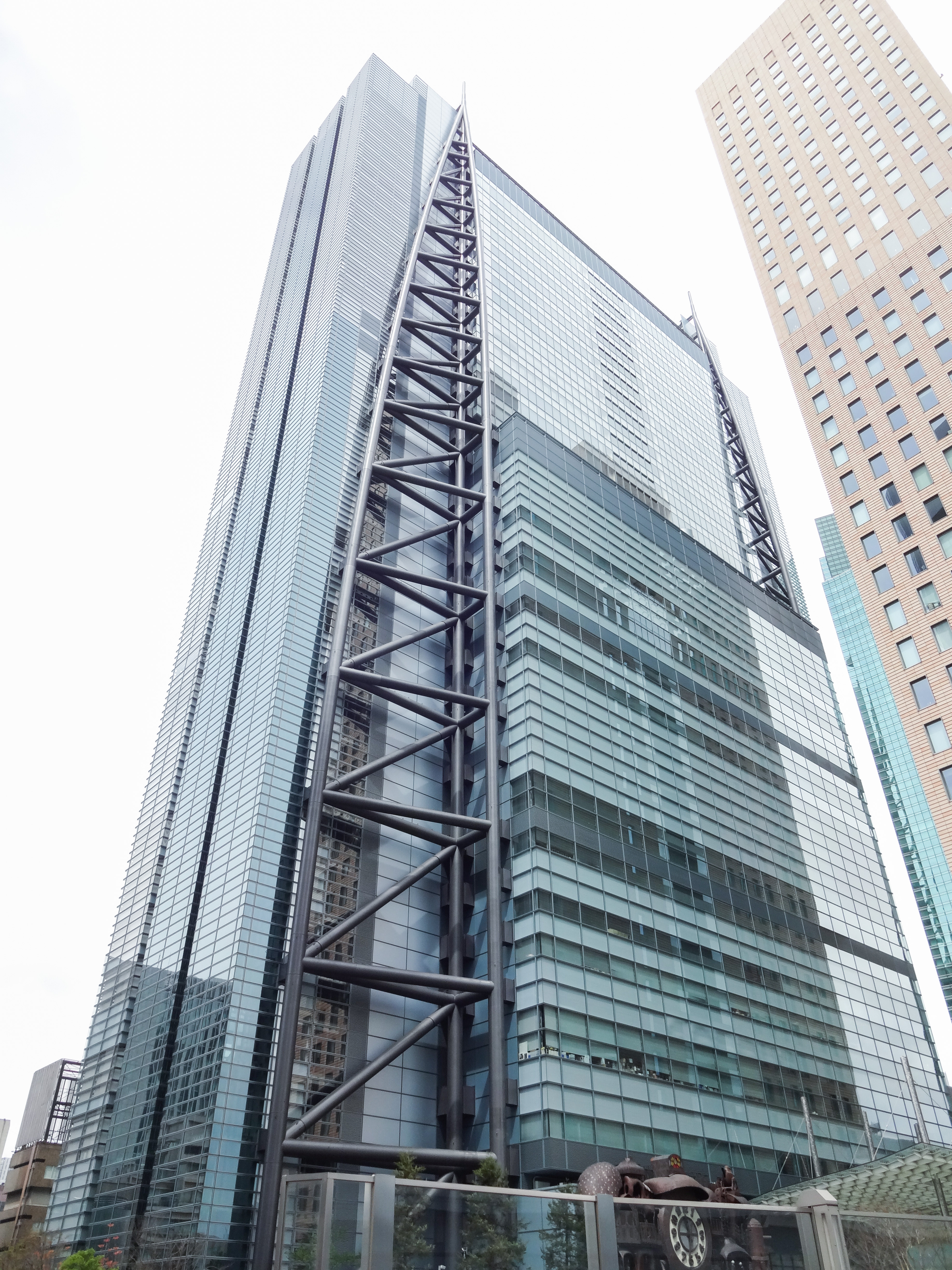
Nittele Tower, headquarters of Nippon TV

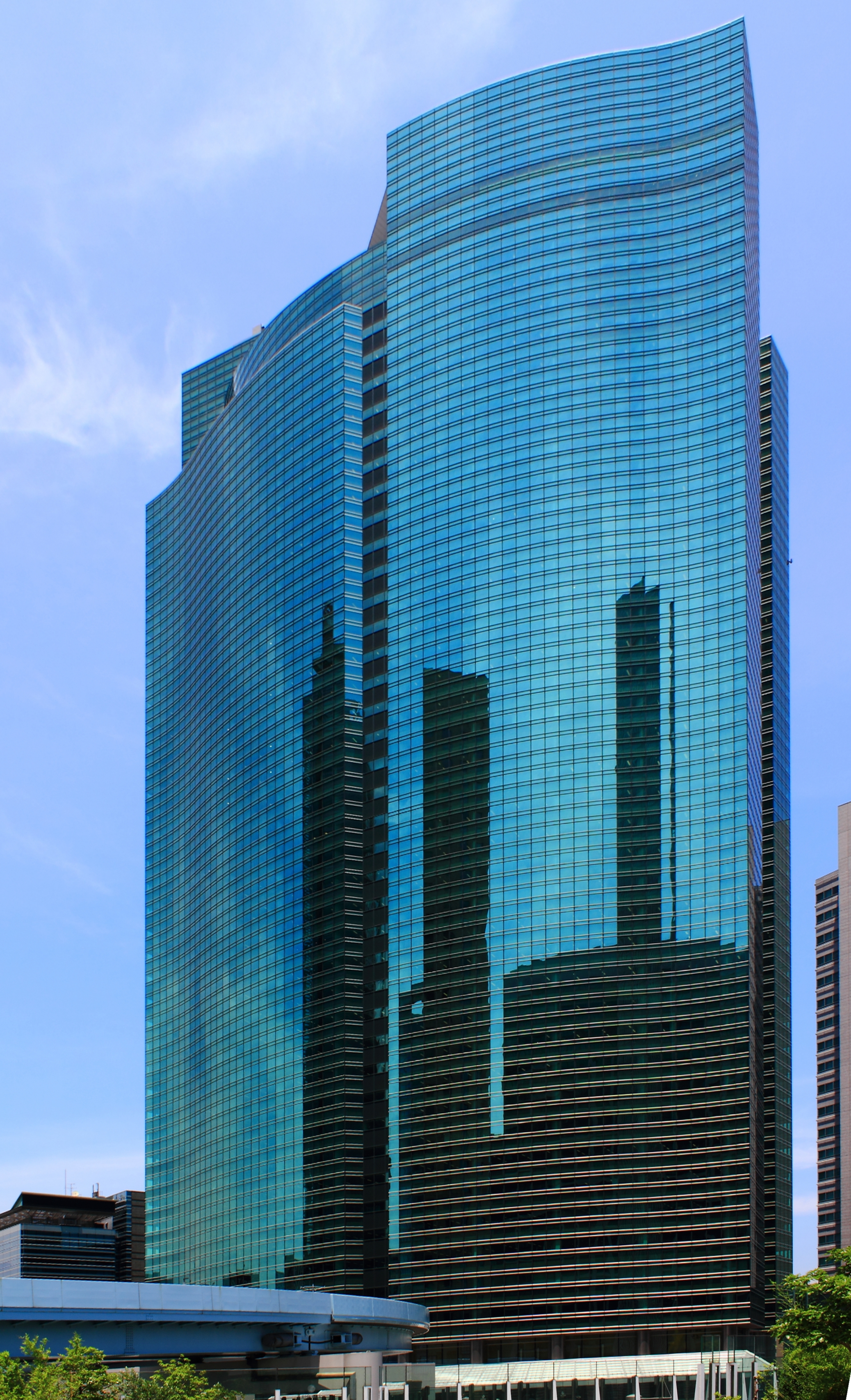
Shiodome City Center

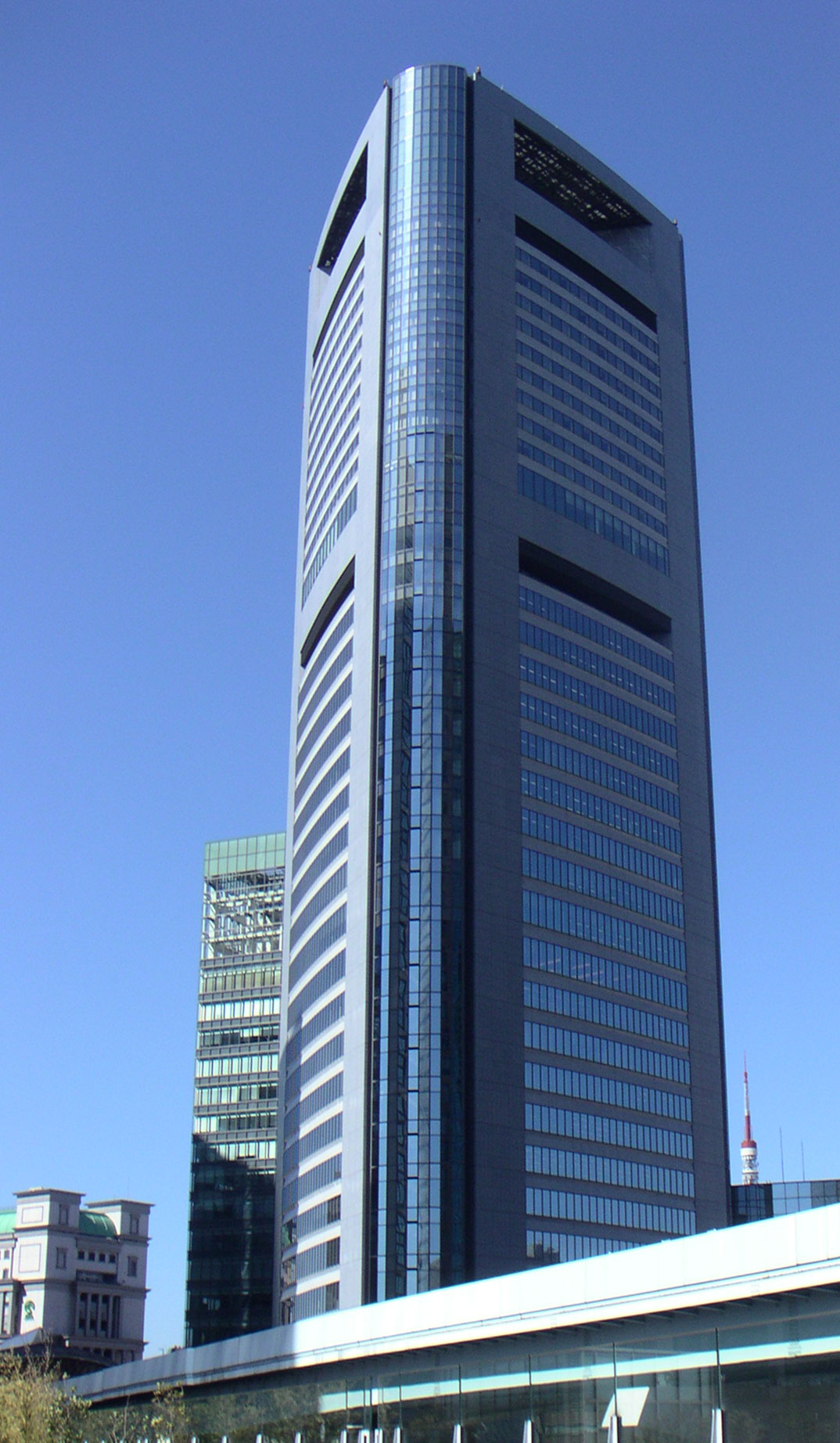
Shiodome Media Tower

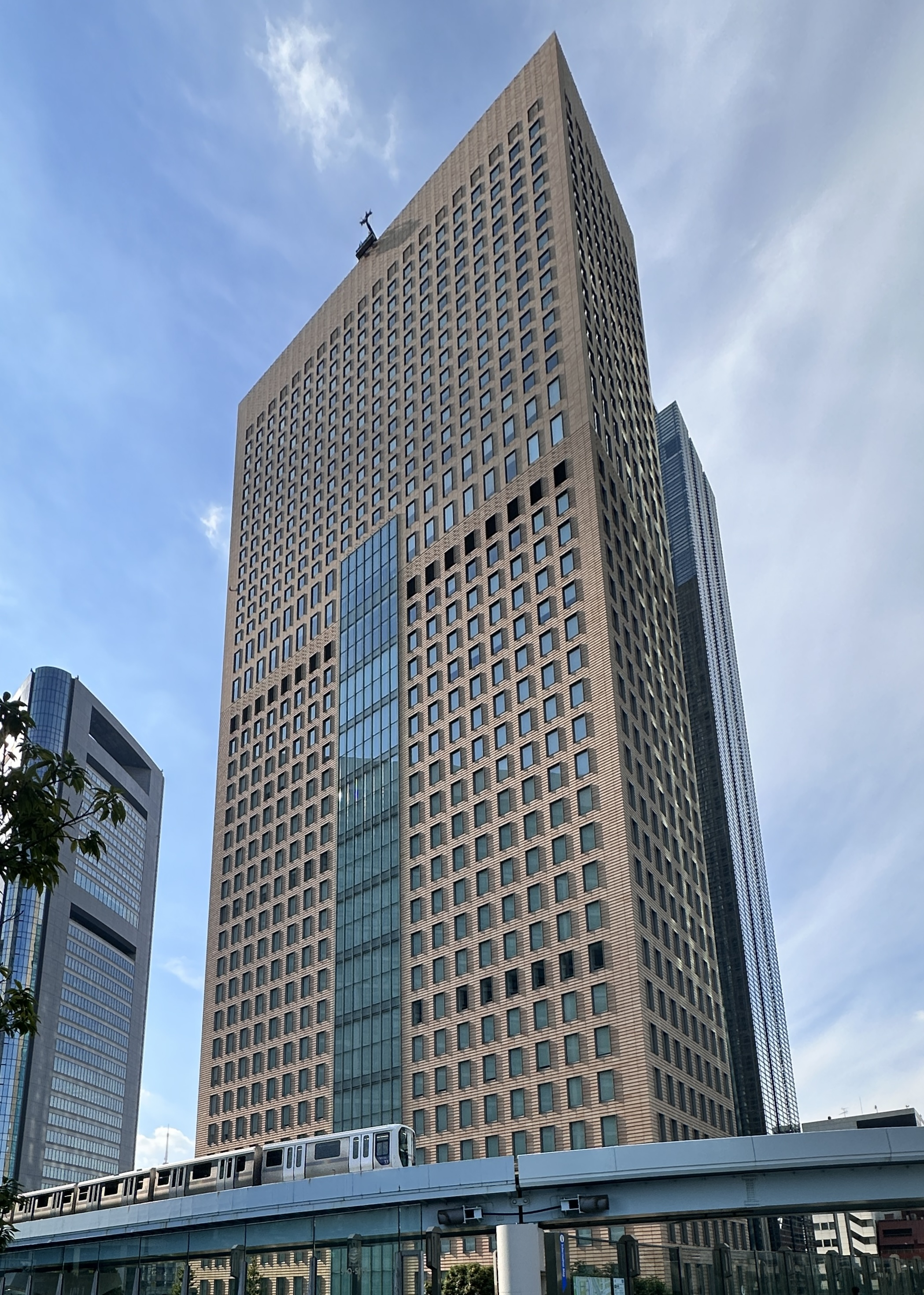
Tokyo Shiodome Tower

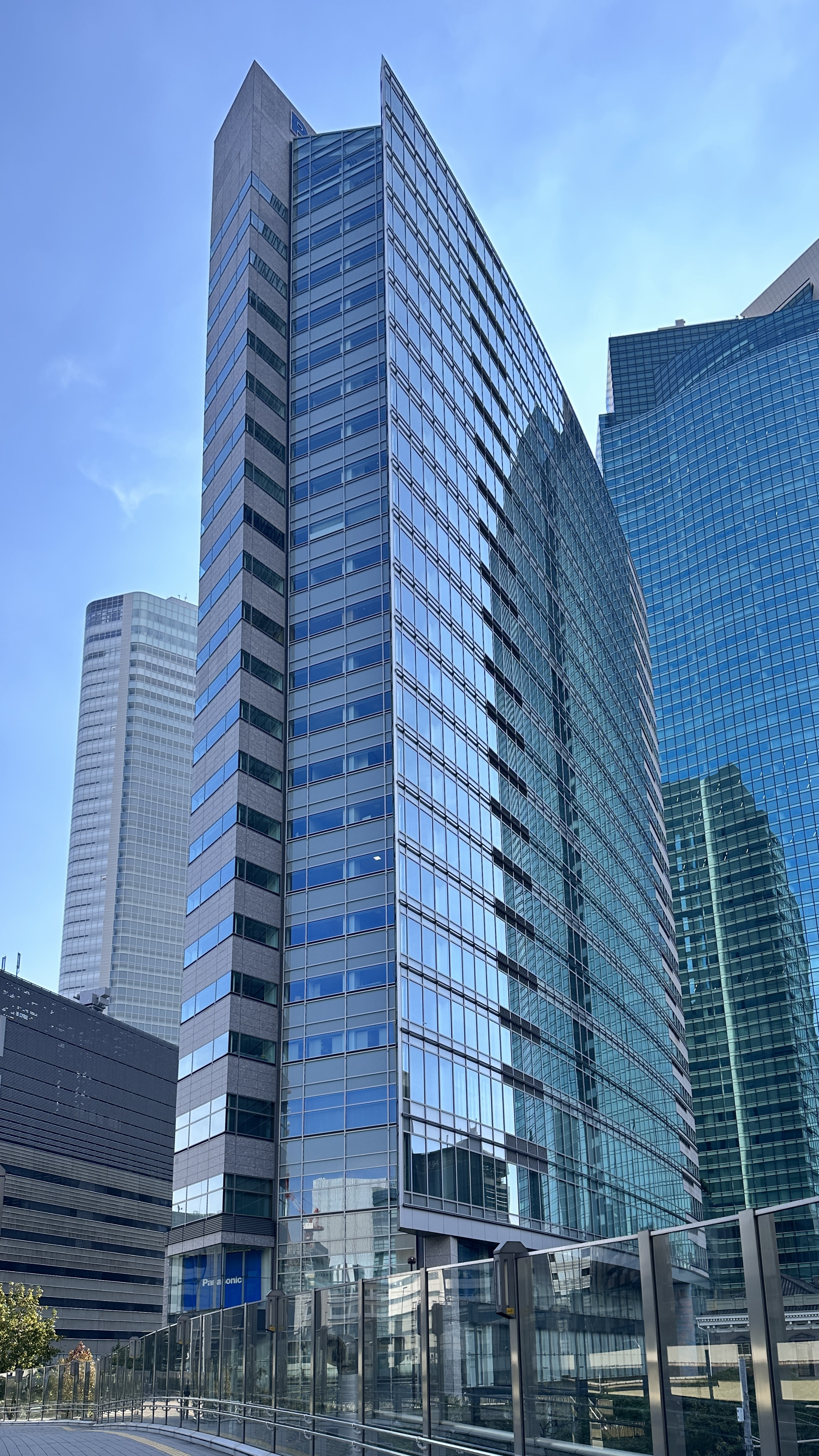
Panasonic Shiodome

== Parks ==
- Hamarikyu Gardens
- Italy Park

== See also ==
- List of development projects in Tokyo
- Canary Wharf, a similar project in London
- Hudson Yards (development), a similar project in New York City
