= Shiodome Freight Terminal =

Former railway station in Minato, Tokyo

Shiodome Freight Terminal 汐留駅
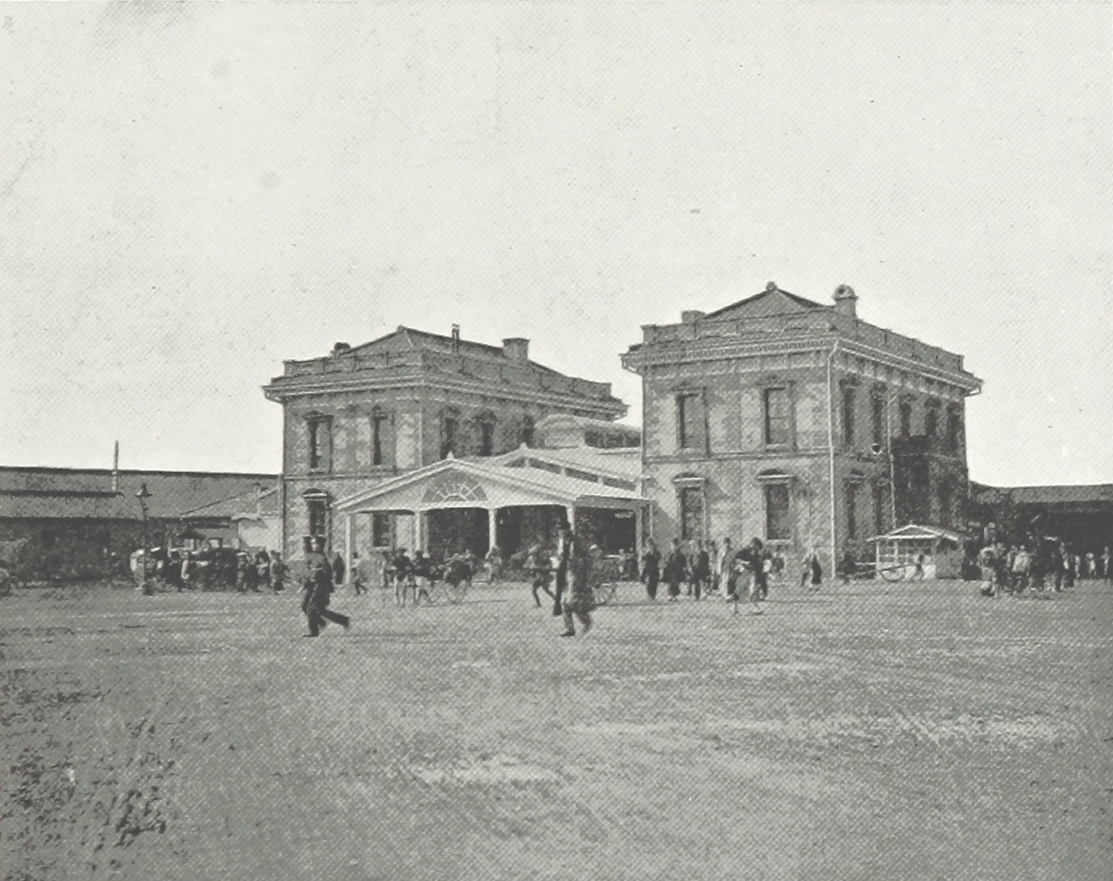
- The original Shimbashi Station in the late 19th century

General information
- Location: Shinbashi 1-chome, Minato, Tokyo; Japan
- Coordinates: 35°39′57″N 139°45′41″E
- Operator: JNR
- Line: Tokaido Main Line

History
- Opened: October 14, 1872
- Closed: November 1, 1986
- Former names: Shimbashi (until 1914)
- National Historic Site of Japan
Location

Shiodome Freight Terminal (汐留駅, Shiodome-eki) was a freight terminal of the Japanese National Railways (JNR) in Minato, Tokyo, Japan. The freight terminal was built on the site of the original Shimbashi Station (新橋駅, Shinbashi-eki) which served as the first railway terminal of Tokyo between 1872 and 1914.

== History ==
Shimbashi Station was built as the Tokyo terminus of Japan's first railway, which ran between Tokyo and Yokohama. The station was inaugurated on October 14, 1872 (public service started on the following day). Freight service started on September 15, 1873. The station building was designed by American engineer Richard Perkins Bridgens (1819–1891) as a two-story wooden-framed white stone building with two wings flanking a bay platform. The station remained the main terminal of Tokyo until December 20, 1914, when the new Tokyo Station began operations. Shimbashi Station was converted to a freight terminal and was renamed "Shiodome", with the name of Shimbashi Station was moved to the former Karasumori Station which is still now called Shimbashi Station. The original station building was destroyed in the 1923 Great Kantō earthquake. The site of the original Shinbashi Station received protection as a National Historic Site in 1965 shortly after opening of the Tōkaidō Shinkansen as urban redevelopment threatened the site with destruction.

Shiodome Freight Terminal ceased operations on November 1, 1986. After the closing of the freight station, the site was transferred to JNR Settlement Corporation, but the sale of the land was not allowed for years due to political considerations of the impact of such a large area of land to the real estate market in Tokyo. Redevelopment of the site was finally started in 1995.

Per archaeological excavations accompanying the redevelopment of the Shiodome area carried out from 1991 to 2000, the foundations of platforms and station buildings, traces of hired foreigners' lodgings, and various railway-related artifacts, such as Western plates, liquor bottles, train tickets and other items were discovered. Currently, the foundations of the platform and station building are preserved, with a reconstruction of the exterior of the station building as it was at the time of its opening. The Shiodome area was opened for public as a business zone called Sio-site in 2002.

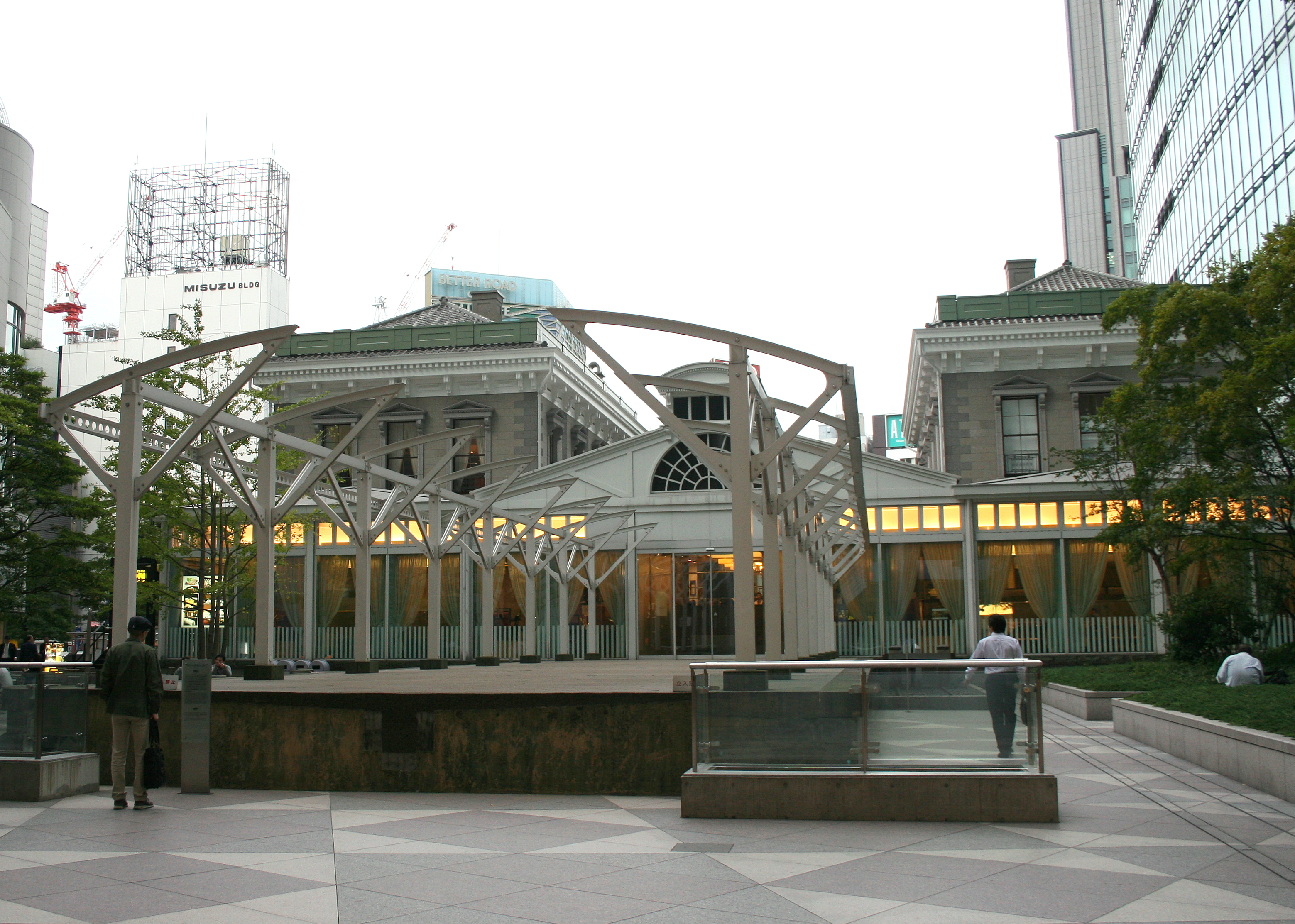
Reproduction of the old Shimbashi Station in Shiodome, October 2007

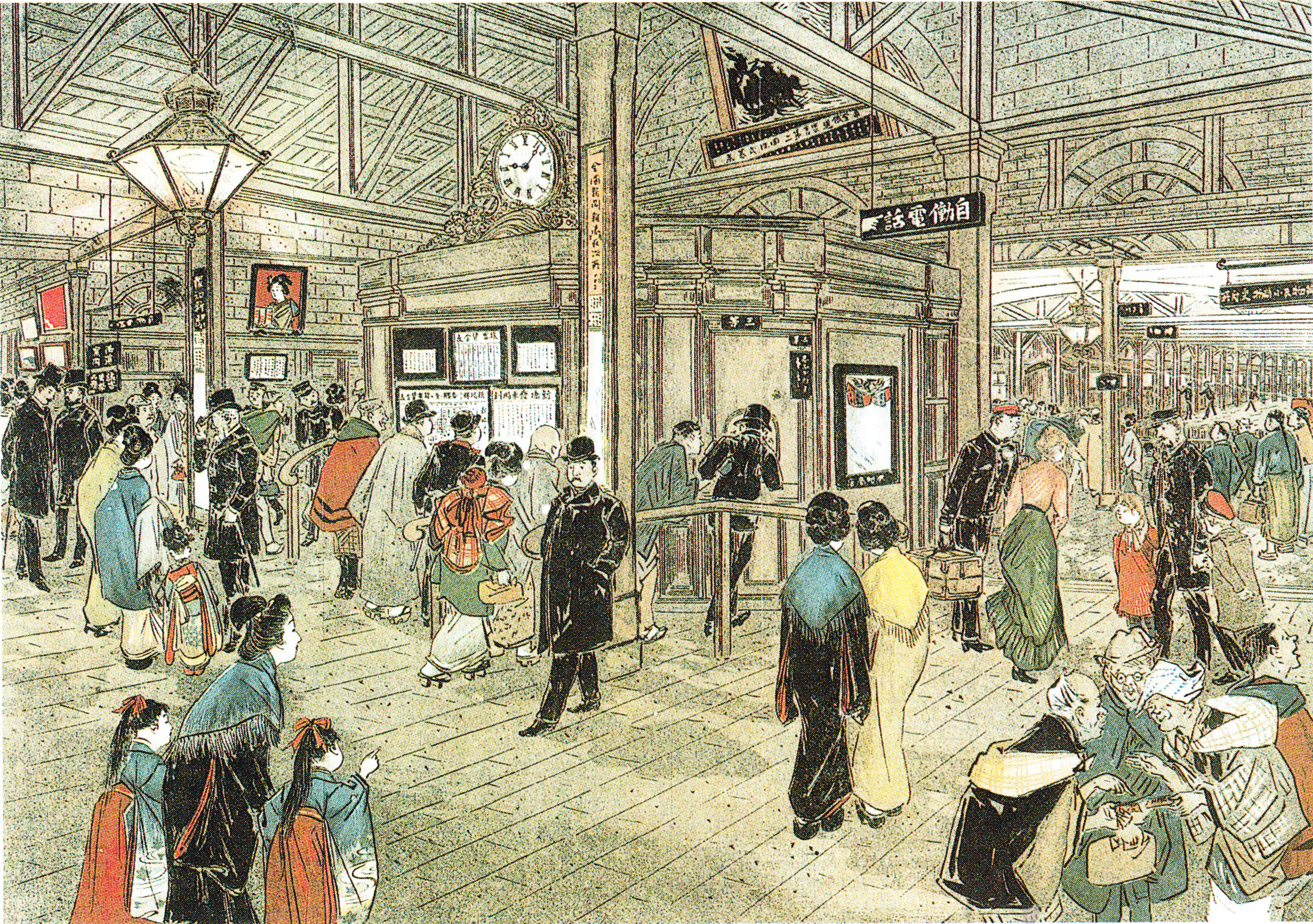
Interior of old Shinbashi Station

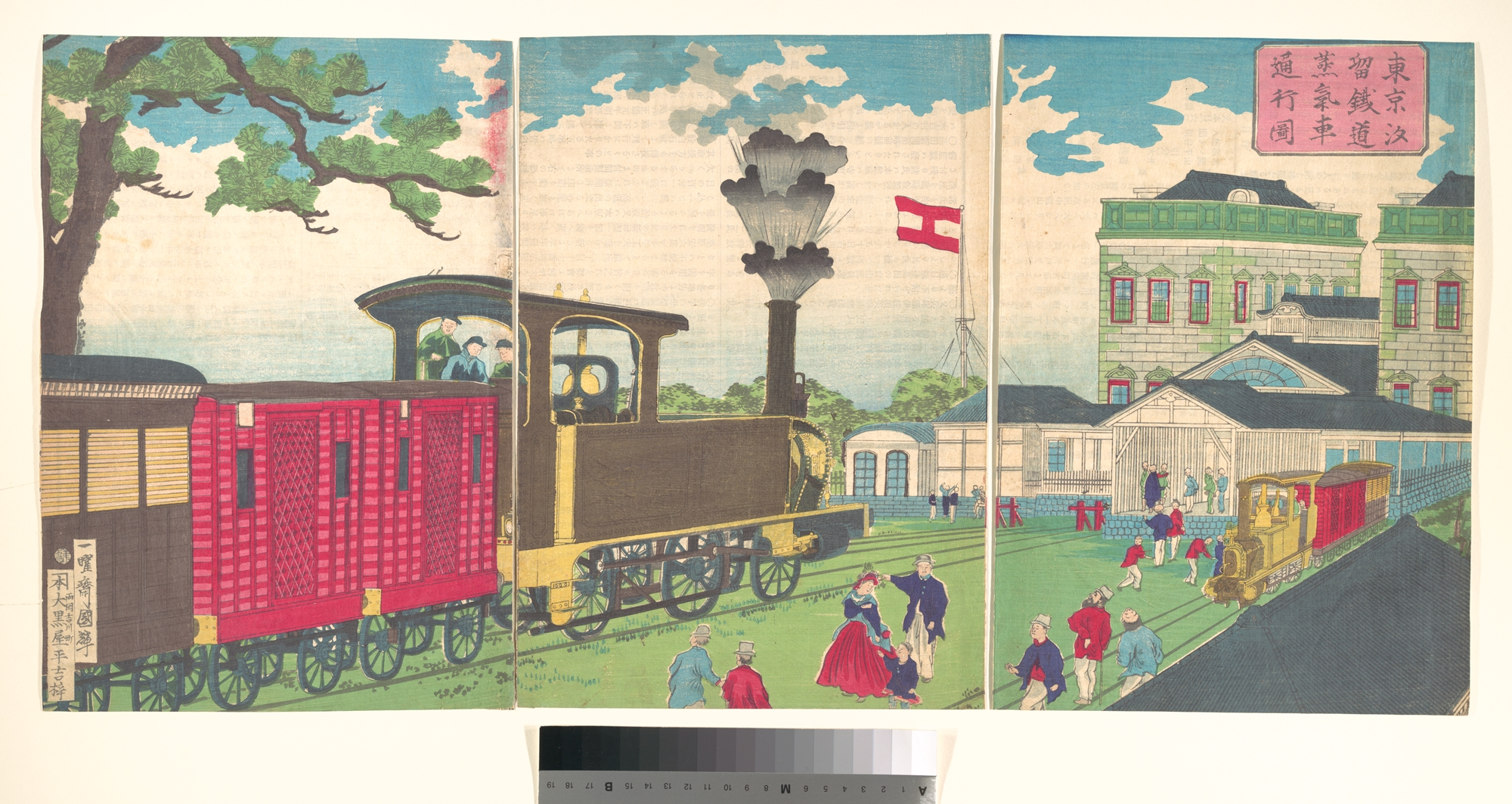
Illustration of a Steam Locomotive Passing Shiodome in Tokyo

== See also ==
- List of Historic Sites of Japan (Tōkyō)
