= Ni-Tele Really Big Clock =

Clock and sculpture in Tokyo, Japan

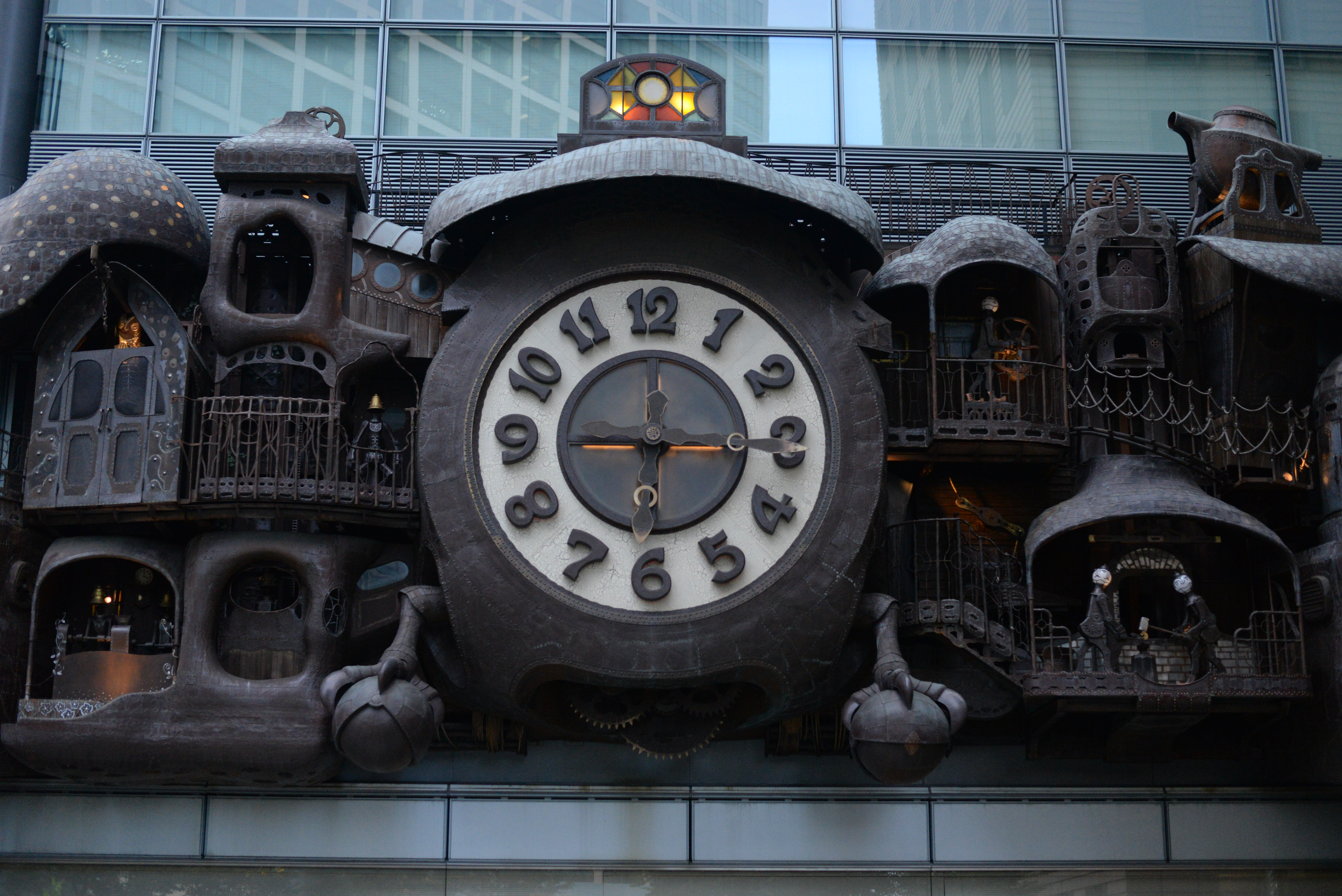
- Front view of the clock
- Artist: Hayao Miyazaki
- Medium: Copper; steel
- Location: Tokyo, Japan; 35.66407°N 139.75994°E

The Ni-Tele Really Big Clock (日テレ大時計, Nittere Ōdokei) is a large clock and sculpture designed by Hayao Miyazaki, installed outside the second story of the Nittele Tower in Minato Ward, Tokyo, Japan. The structure, which is made entirely of hand-worked copper and steel plates, is 12 meters tall by 18 meters long and contains 32 separate moving mechanical features. This clockwork assembly performs a three-minute show a few times each day (four on weekdays, five on weekends).

== Reception ==
Time Out Tokyo editors Matt Schley and Kaila Imada included the work in their 2019 list of the city's "best public art sculptures".
