= Dentsu Building =

Skyscraper in Japan

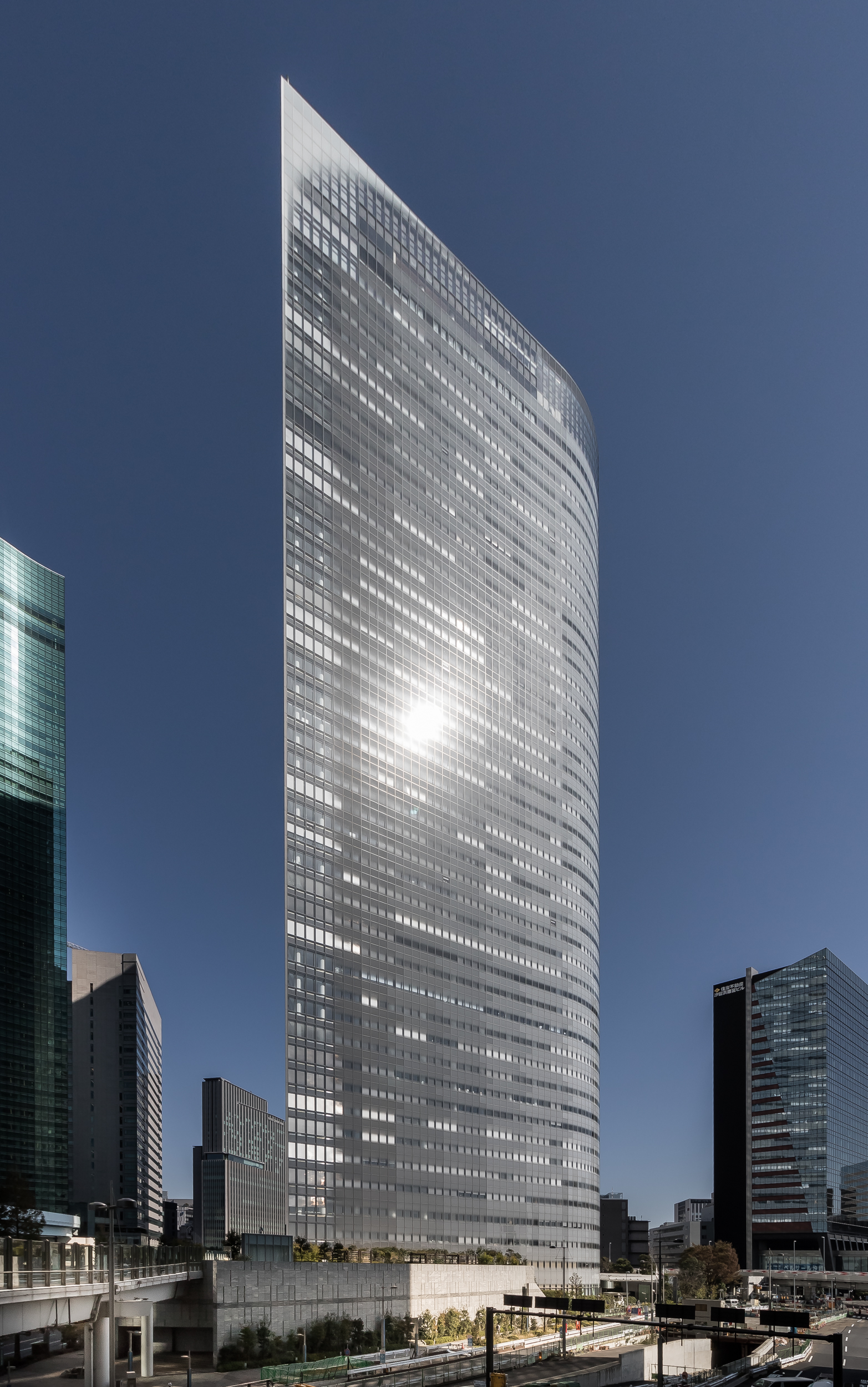

General information
- Type: Office
- Location: Shiodome, Minato, Tokyo, Japan
- Coordinates: 35.66437°N 139.76237°E
- Construction started: 1999
- Completed: 2002
- Owner: Dentsu (until 2021); Trustee in real estate: Mizuho Trust & Banking; Beneficiary: Shibaguchibashi Investment LLC (Hulic, Mizuho Leasing, etc.)

Height
- Antenna spire: 213.34 metres (700 ft)
- Roof: 210.09 metres (689 ft)

Technical details
- Floor count: 53 (48 above ground, 5 underground)
- Lifts/elevators: 70

Design and construction
- Architects: Jean Nouvel; The Jerde Partnership; Obayashi Corporation
- Main contractor: Obayashi Corporation; Shimizu Corporation; Kajima Construction; Taisei Corporation; Takenaka Corporation

The Dentsu Building or Dentsu Headquarters Building (電通本社ビル, Dentsū Honsha Biru) is a high-rise building in the Shiodome area of Minato, Tokyo, Japan. The building houses the corporate offices of Dentsu.

== Description ==
48 floors rise to 213.34 m (700 ft), it is the twelfth-tallest building in Tokyo and second-tallest in Shiodome, next to Shiodome City Center.

It was designed by French architect Jean Nouvel and completed in 2002. It was built over the site of Tokyo's first train station, and sits aside the Hamarikyu Gardens, formerly the site of a shōgun's vacation home. The Dentsu building is an example of contemporary architecture, featuring collectors on the roof to utilize rainwater for its plumbing system, as well as ceramic dots on the windows which, in concert with computerized window shades, control climate control expenditure. The Dentsu building has 70 elevators, including a special elevator reserved only for VIPs and executive management.

Brookfield Asset Management agreed to buy the building from its owner in February 2026 in a deal reportedly worth about $1.9 billion.

With the exception of sludge, all waste materials produced in the construction of the Dentsu Building were recycled.

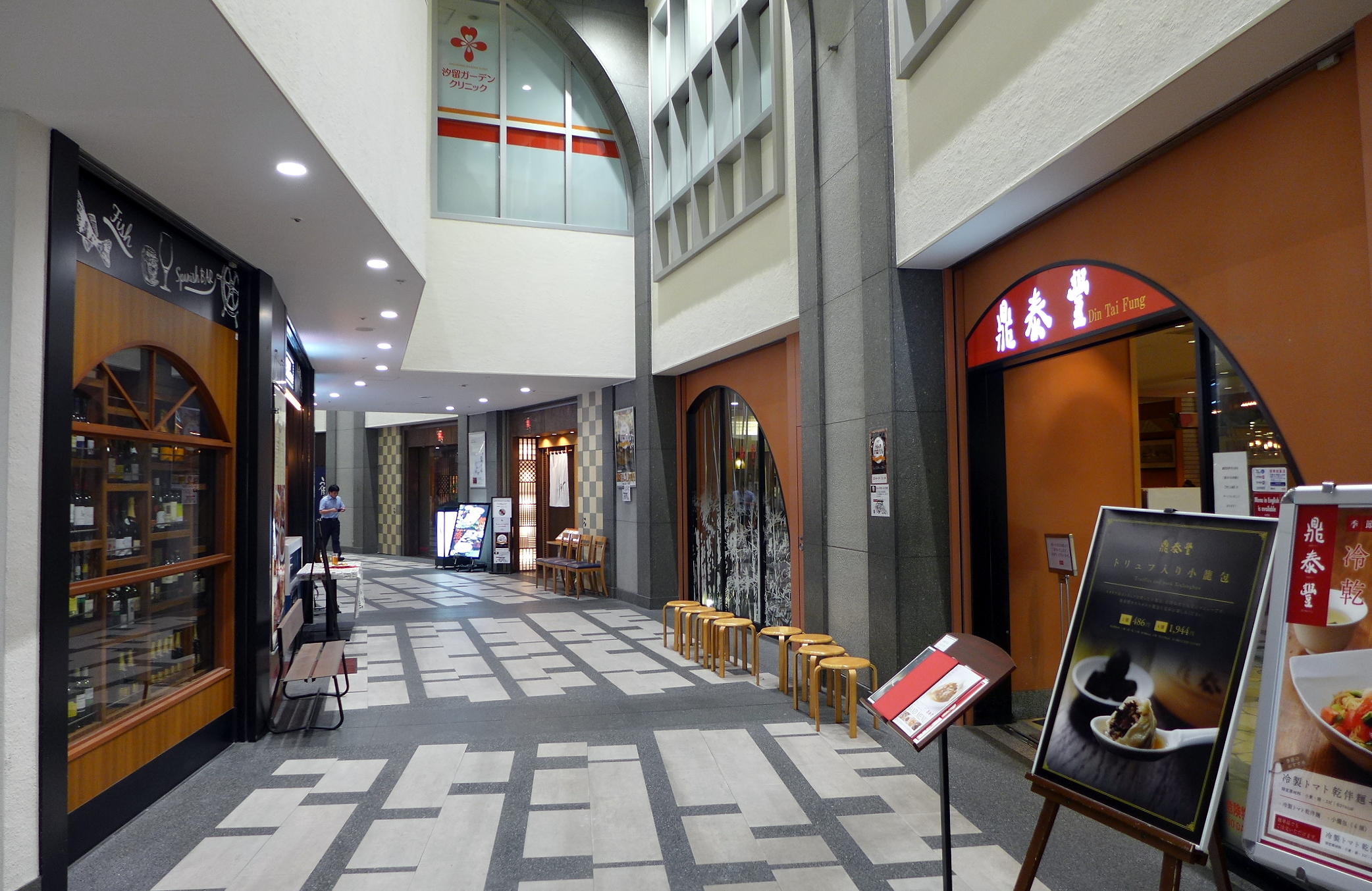
Caretta Shopping Arcade

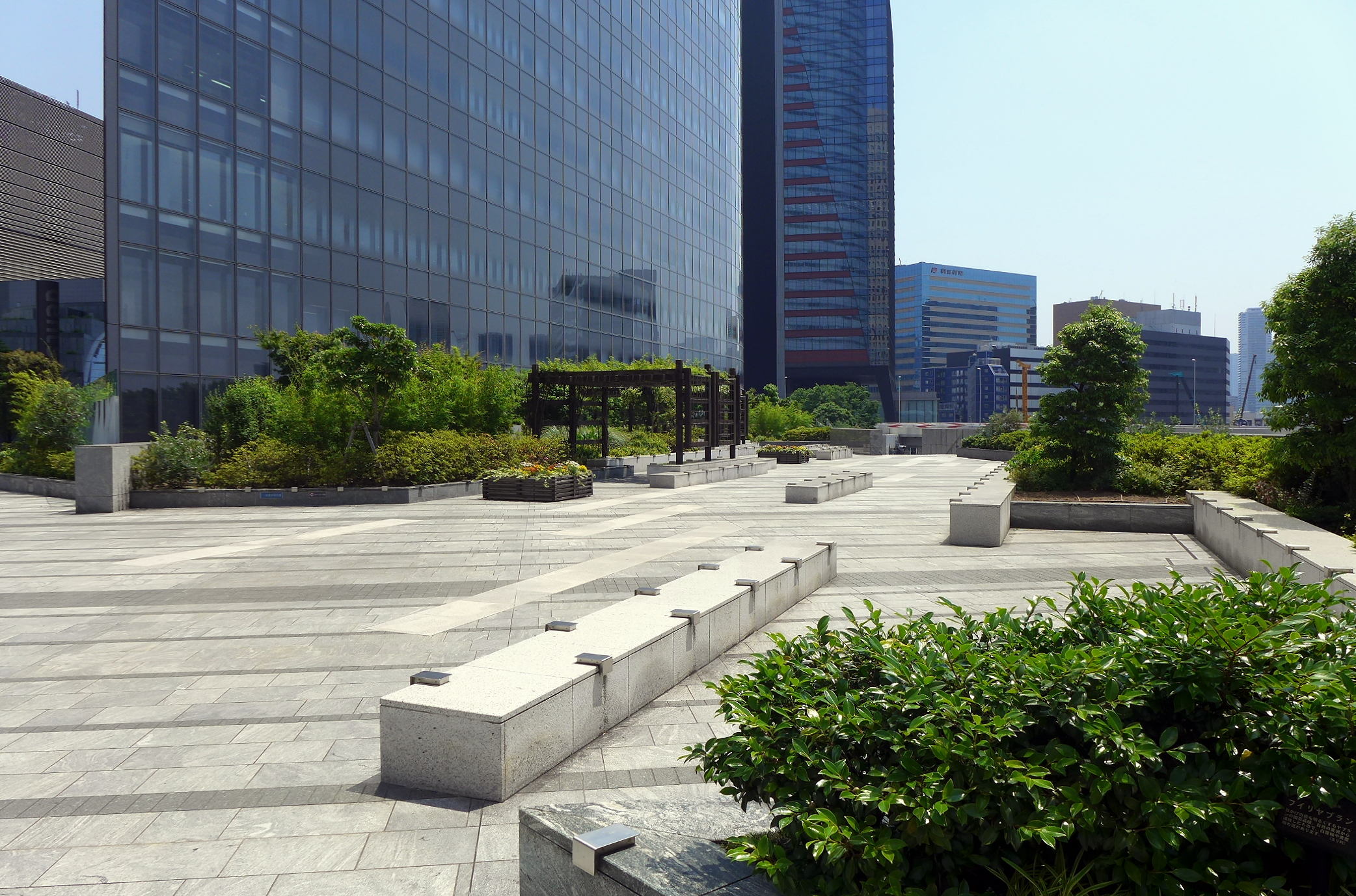
Outside open space

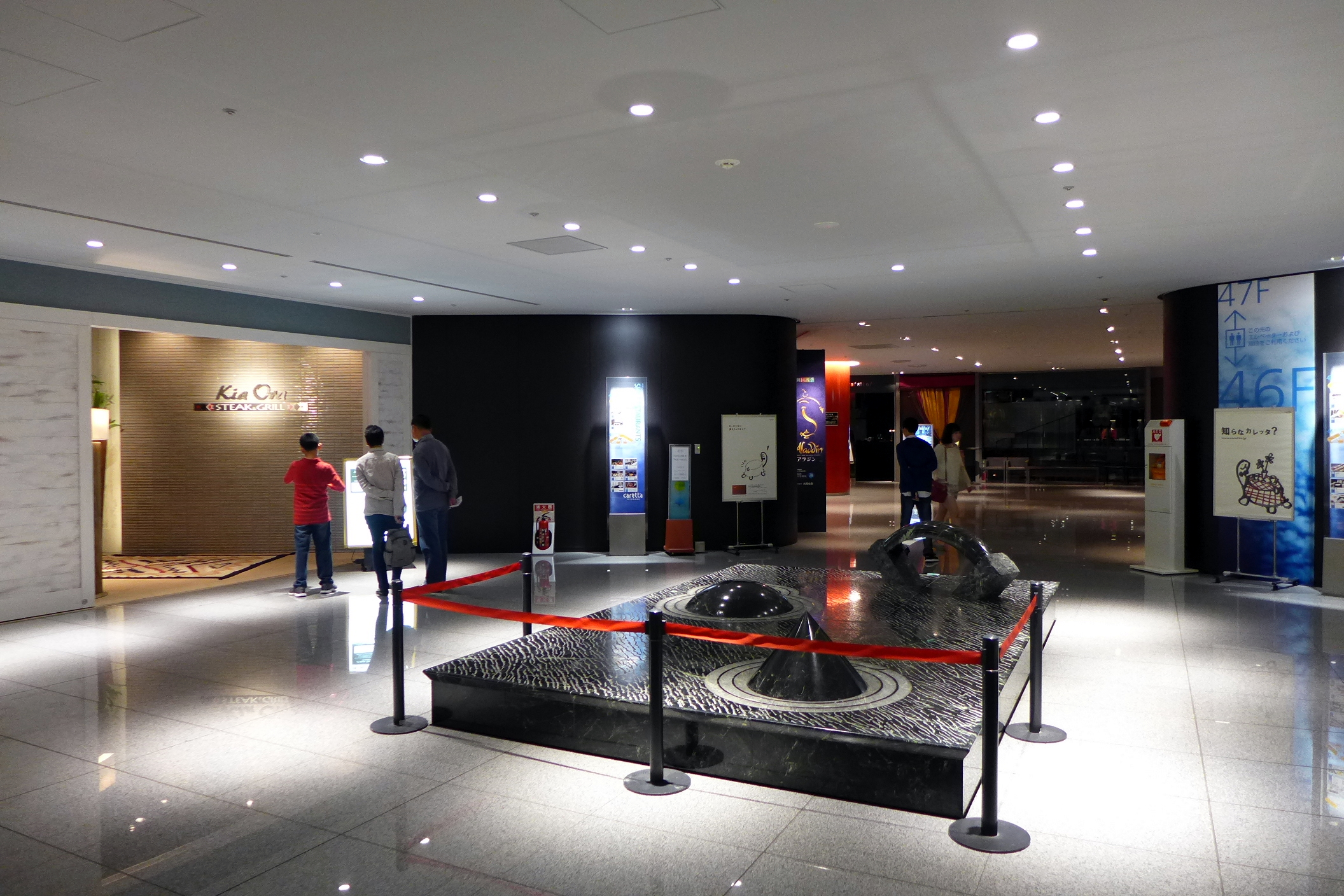
Sky Restaurants in 46/F

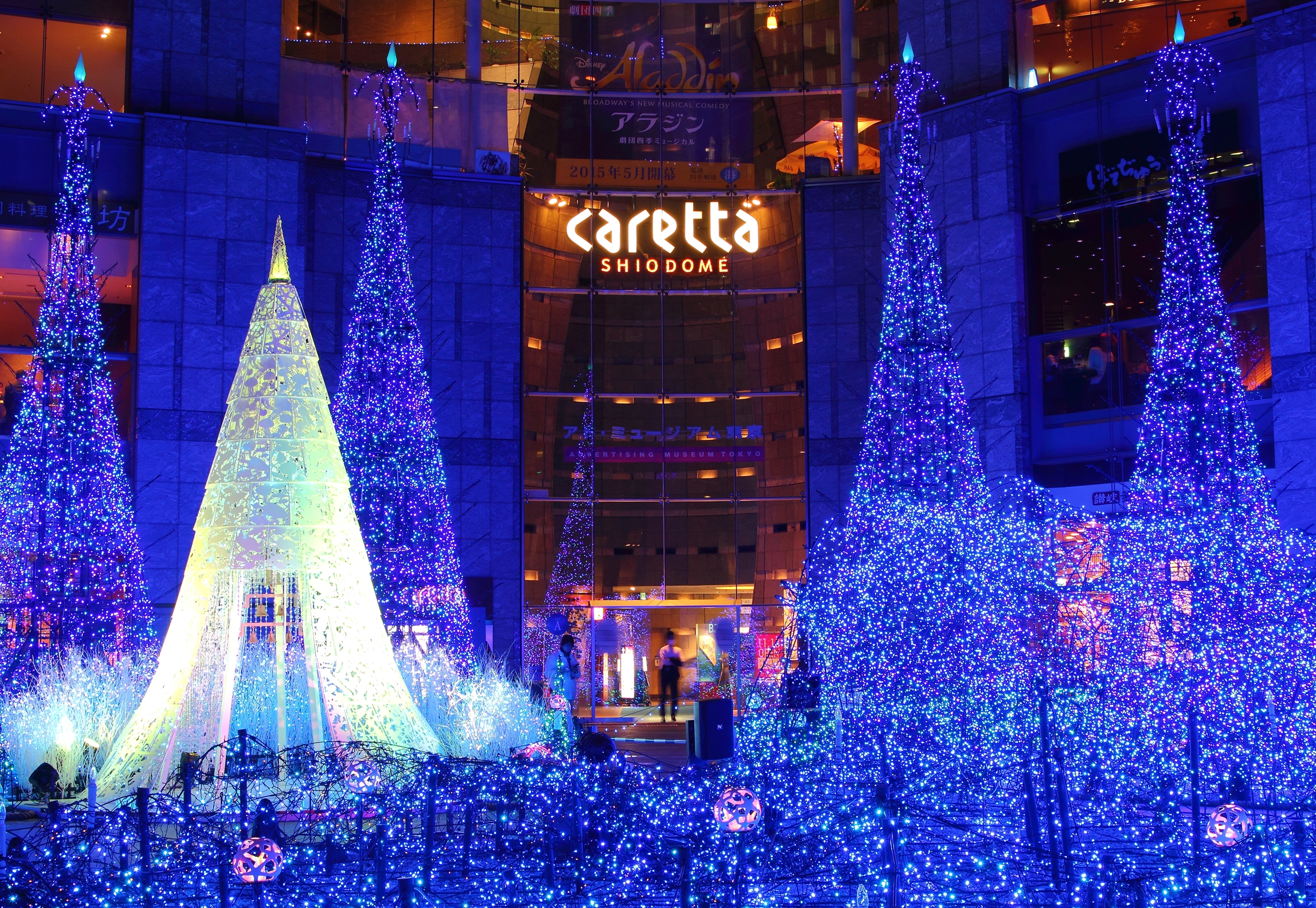
Caretta Shiodome during Christmas in 2014

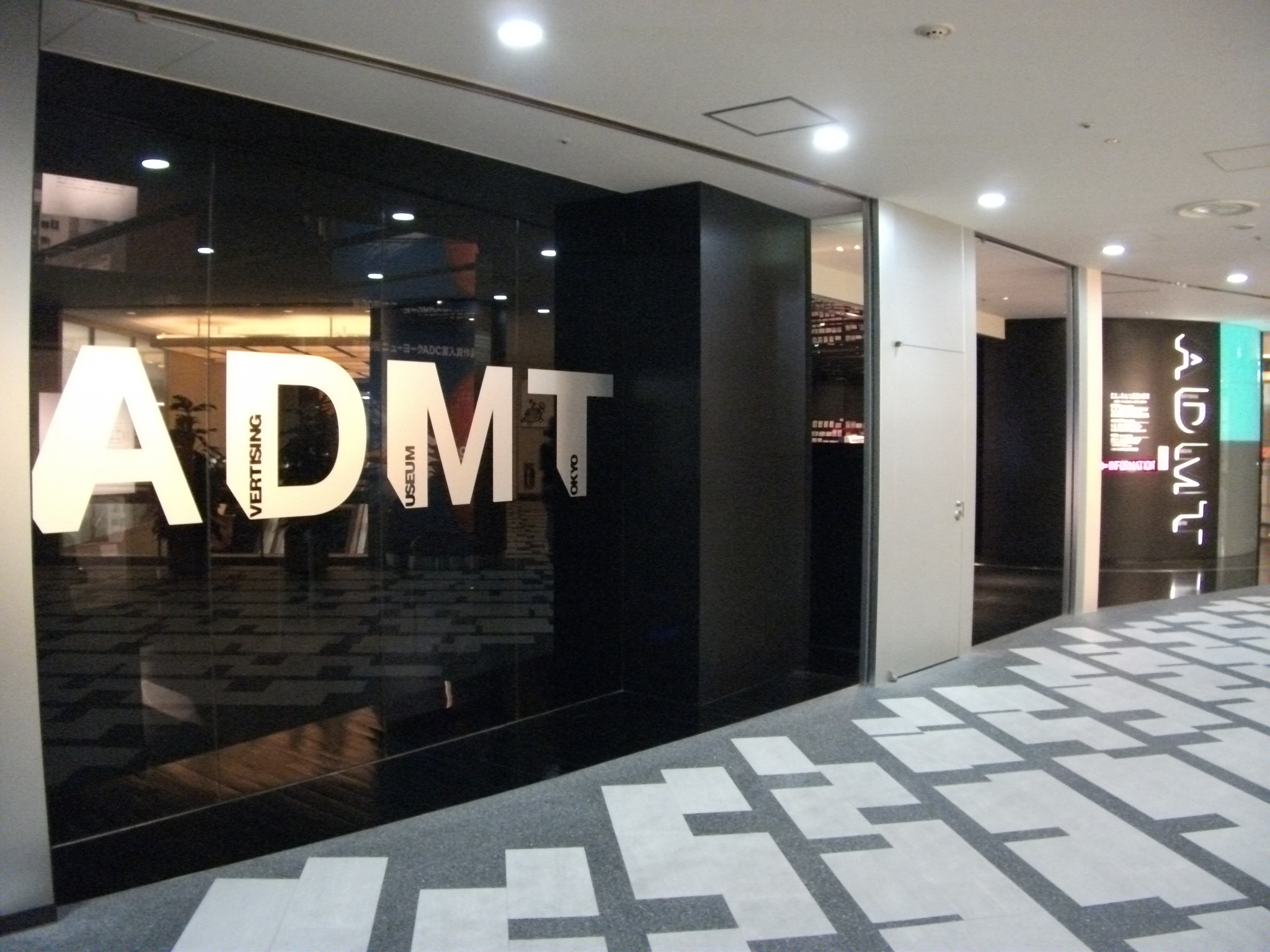
Ad Museum
