= Nittele Tower =

Skyscraper in Japan

Coordinates: 35°39′51.91″N 139°45′35.68″E

Shiodome NTV Tower
- 日本テレビタワー
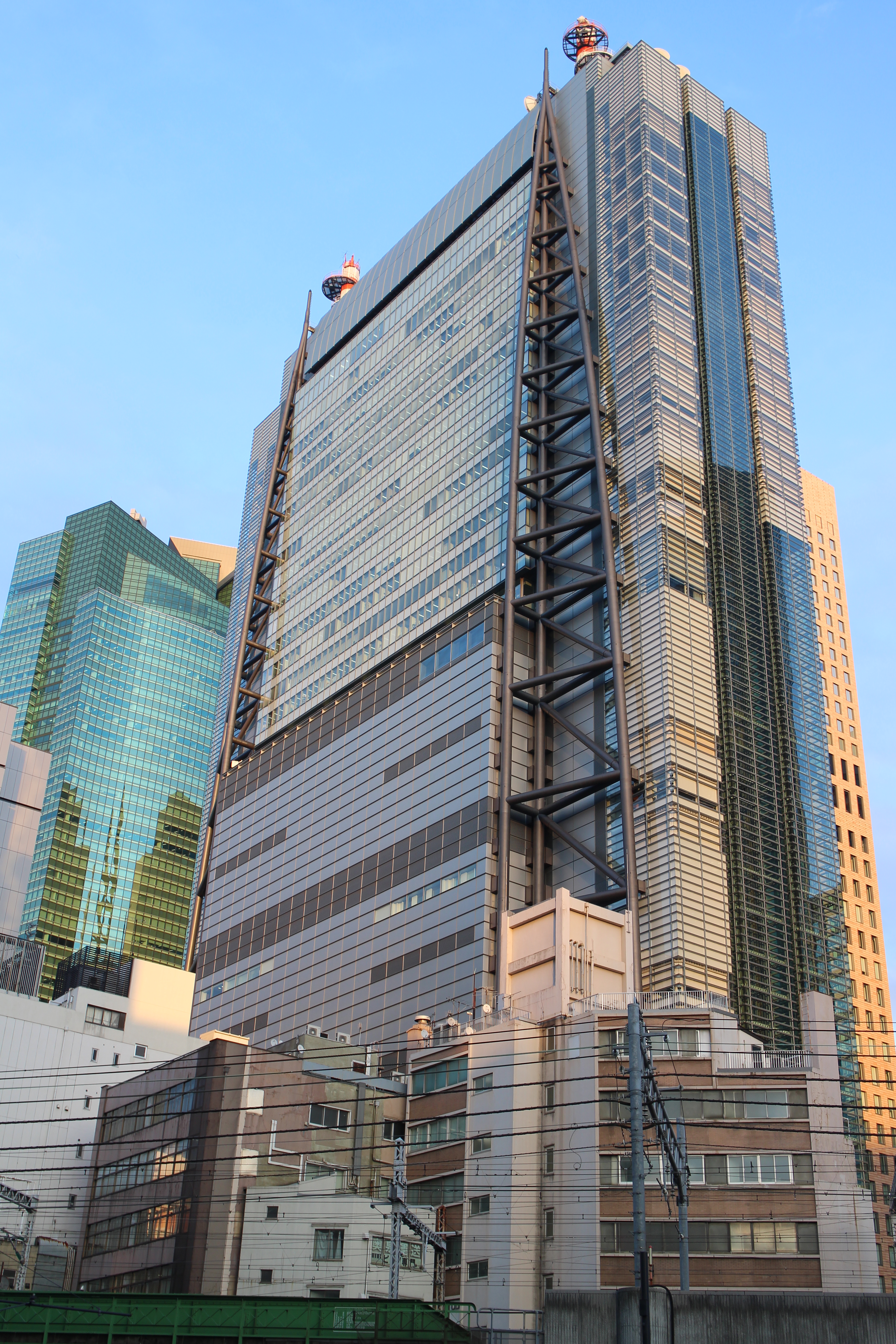
- Interactive map of the Shiodome NTV Tower area

General information
- Location: Minato, Tokyo, Japan
- Construction started: January 2000; 26 years ago
- Construction stopped: 30 April 2004; 22 years ago
- Opened: February 29, 2004; 22 years ago
- Owner: Nippon Television

Height
- Height: 192 m (629.9 ft)

Design and construction
- Architecture firm: Richard Rogers Partnership, Mitsubishi Estate
- Main contractor: Shimizu Corporation

The Nittele Tower (日テレタワー, Nittere tawaa) is a structural expressionist office building located in Minato, Tokyo, Japan. It houses the headquarters of Nippon Television. The 32-storey building has a height of 192 metres. Construction was finished in 2003.

As a part of the design and aesthetics of the exterior, the building has 2 large sculpture pieces attached one either side. Majority of people would assume it was decorative but in fact it was designed by Richard Rogers Partnership to assist the building from wind loads and during earthquakes.

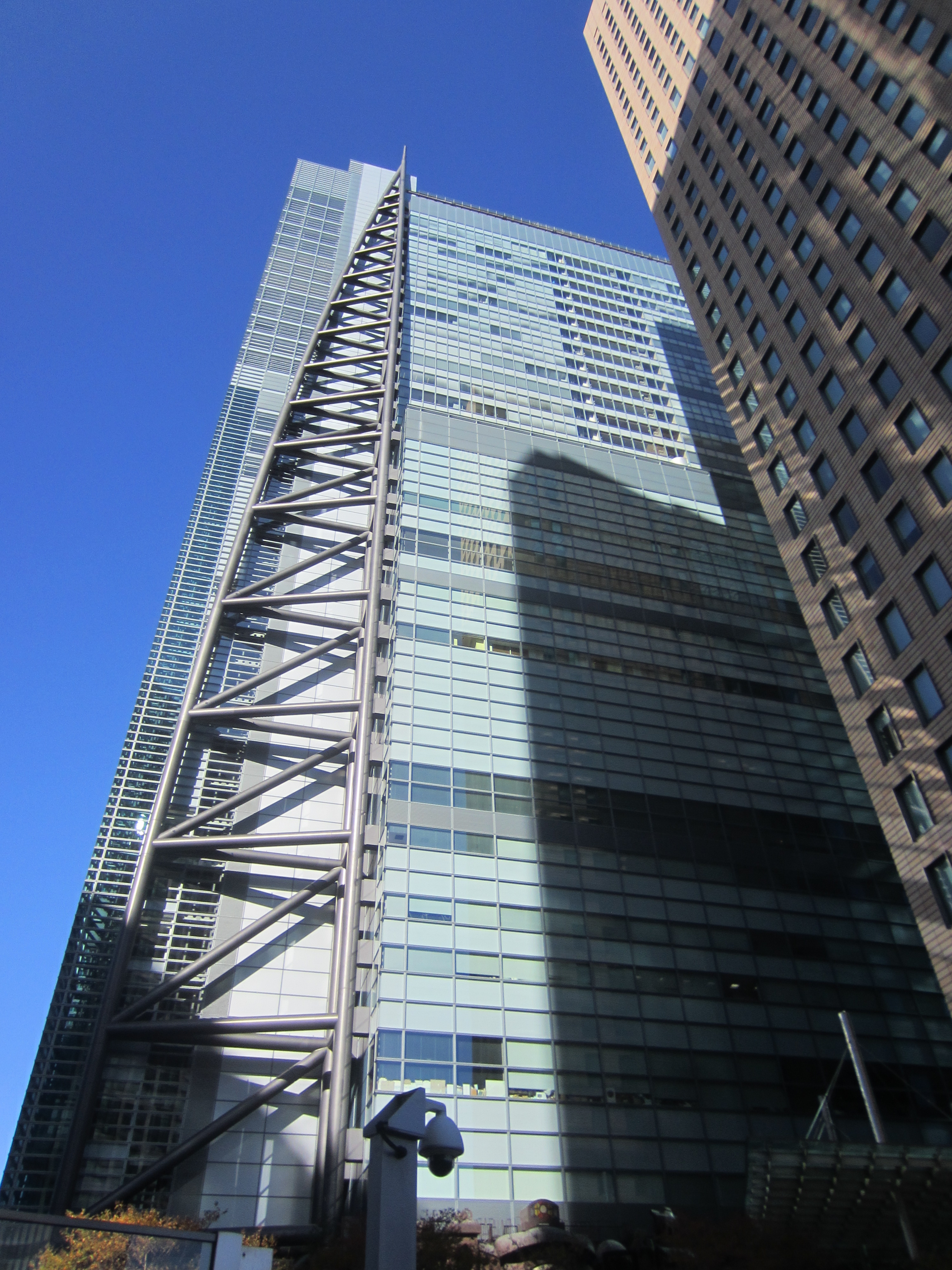
Shiodome NTV Tower in Tokyo, 2019

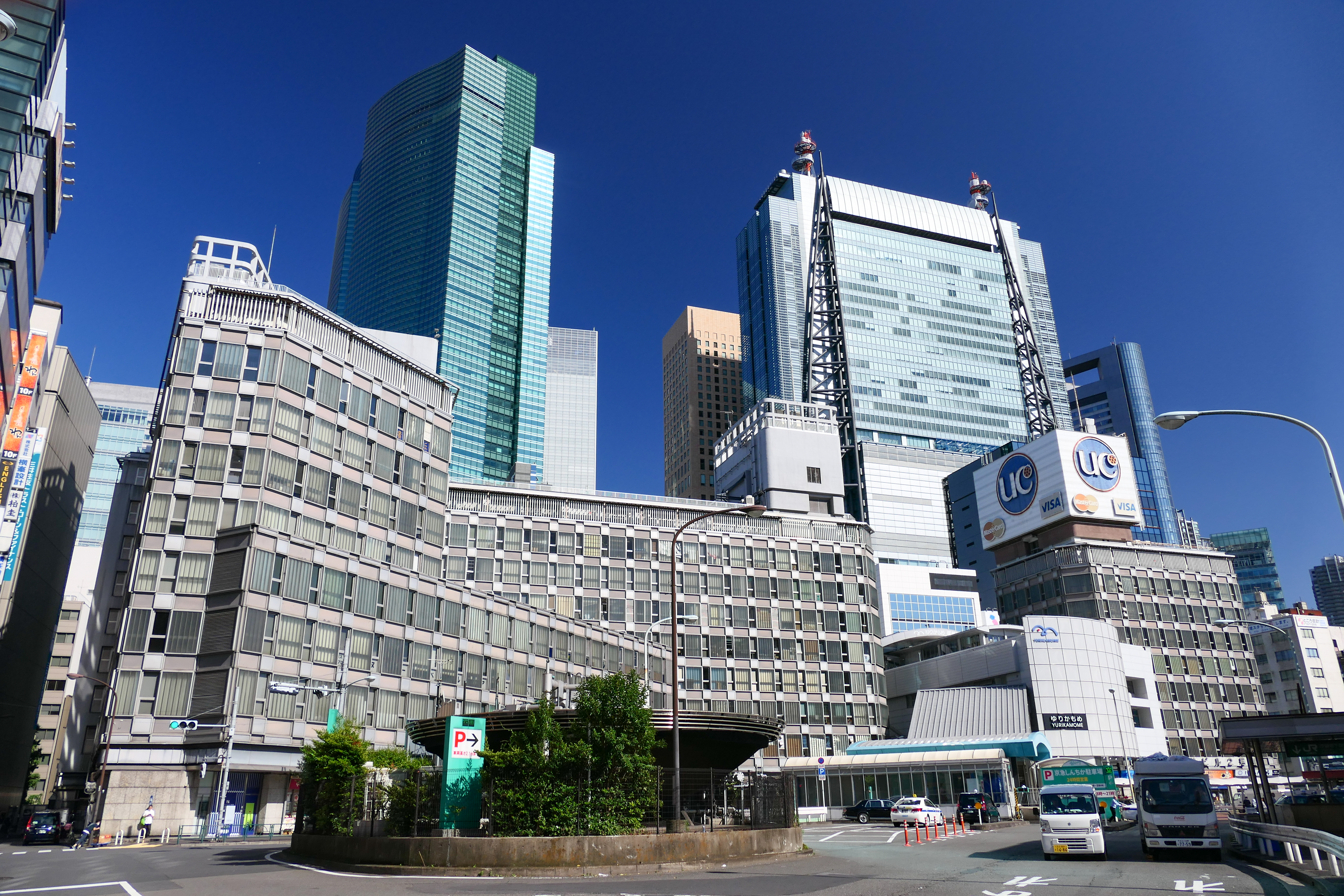
The tower (right) seen from Shimbashi station

“Nittele Tower has four different types of damping devices installed, 2 TMD’s for habitability under wind induced vibrations, 32 oil dampers for wind induced vibrations and weak/ medium class earthquakes, 64 unbonded bracing dampers and 312 link beam dampers for extremely strong earthquakes.” (Advanced structural wind engineering, 2013, Springer, Tokyo; Heidelberg.)

== See also ==
- Ni-Tele Really Big Clock
