= Hama-rikyū Gardens =

Park in Chūō, Tokyo, Japan

- Hama-rikyu Gardens (浜離宮恩賜庭園, Hama-rikyū Onshi Teien)
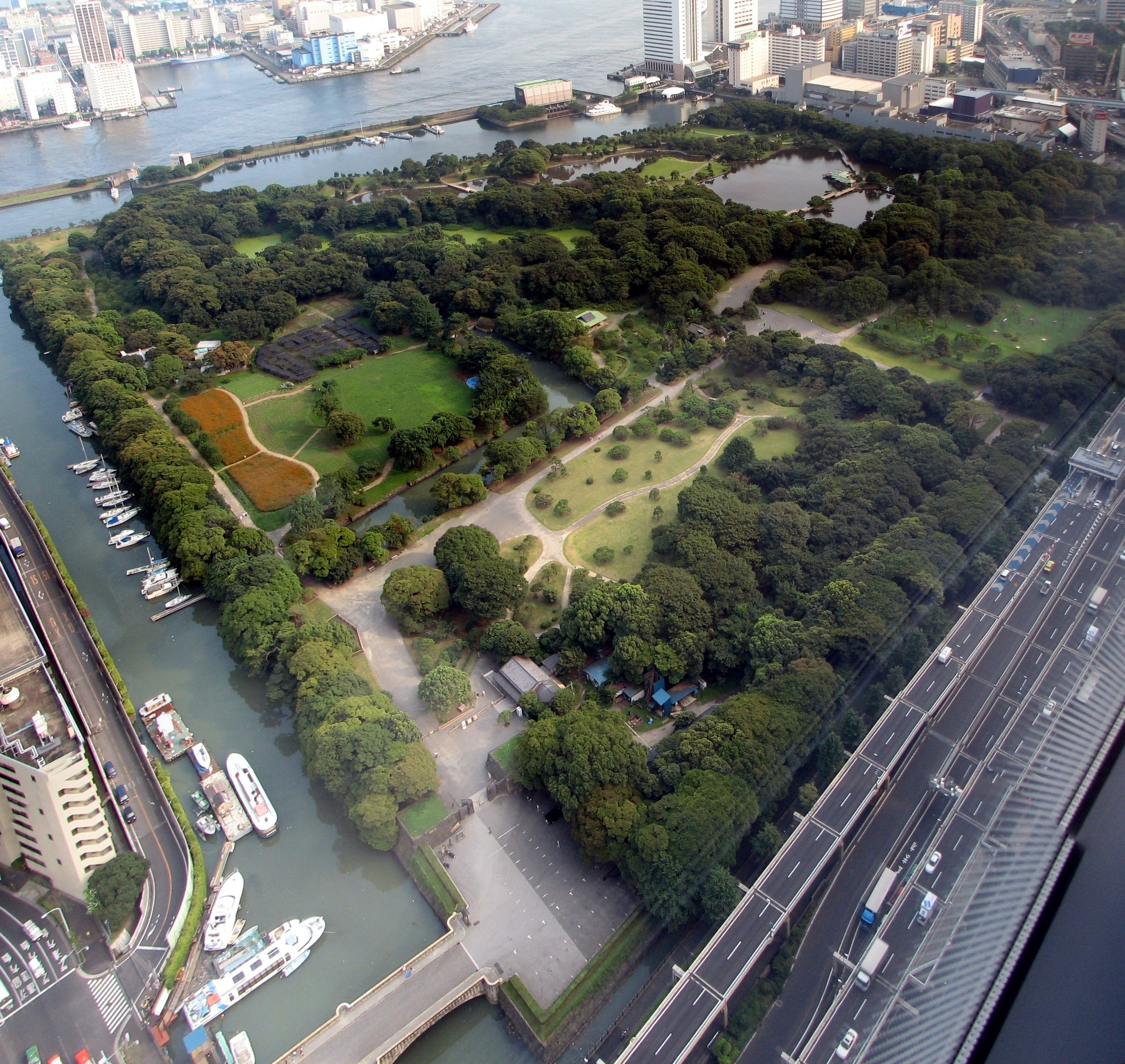
- Hama-rikyū Gardens seen from Shiodome
- Interactive map of Hama-rikyū Gardens
- Type: Urban park
- Location: Chūō, Tokyo, Japan
- Coordinates: 35°39′36″N 139°45′43″E
- Area: 250,215.72 square metres (61.82965 acres)
- Created: April 1, 1946
- Special National Historic Site of Japan Special National Place of Scenic Beauty

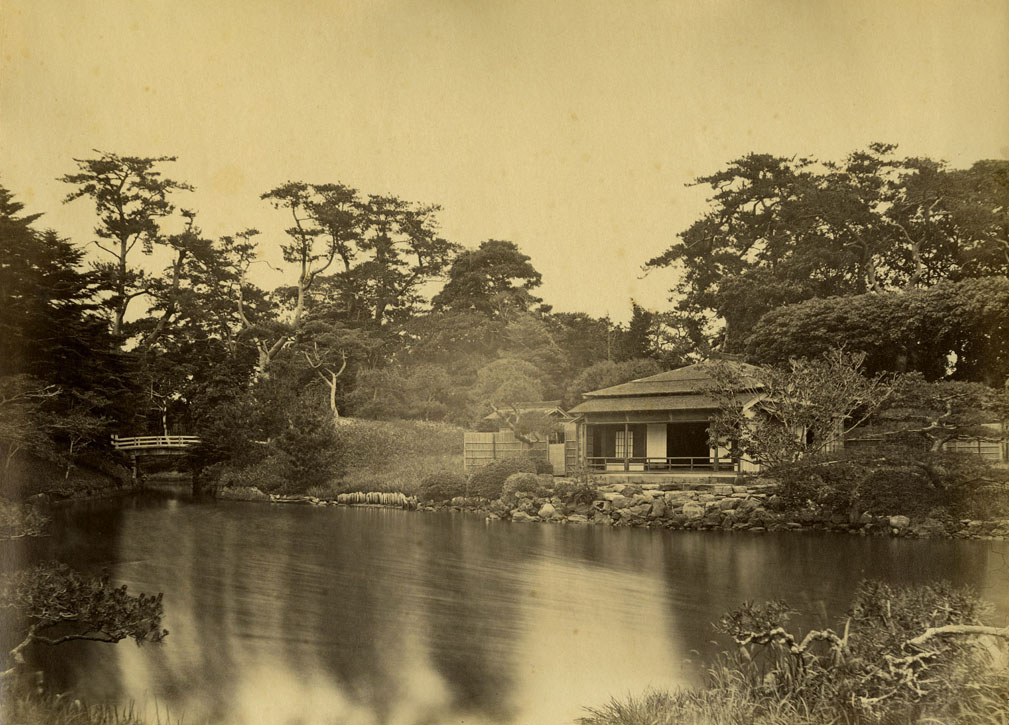
in 1863, photo by Felice Beato

Hama-rikyū Gardens (浜離宮恩賜庭園, Hama-rikyū Onshi Teien) is a metropolitan garden in Chūō ward, Tokyo, Japan. Located at the mouth of the Sumida River, it was opened to the public on April 1, 1946. A landscaped garden of 250,216 m^{2} includes Shioiri-no-ike (Tidal Pond), and the garden is surrounded by a seawater moat filled by Tokyo Bay. It was remodeled as a public garden on the site of a villa belonging to the ruling Tokugawa family in the 17th century.

At the centre of Shioiri-no-ike is a teahouse, reached by two bridges, where visitors can enjoy refreshments, such as matcha and Japanese sweets, in the tea-ceremony style. The garden includes a peony garden, a plum tree grove and fields with flowers for every season. Japanese falconry and aikido are demonstrated at New Year.

== History ==
In 1654, Tokugawa Tsunashige, the third son of Shōgun Tokugawa Iemitsu and daimyō of Kōfu Domain, received permission to reclaim land from Edo Bay, upon which he built a villa and garden. The property was inherited by his son, Tokugawa Ienobu, who later became 6th Tokugawa shōgun. Succeeding generations of shōgun used the location as a secondary residence, and from the time of Tokugawa Ienari through Tokugawa Ieyoshi, it was a place where the shōgun could indulge in falconry. The main palace at Hama was destroyed by fire in 1724, and has not been rebuilt since. In 1729, an elephant which had been received by the shōgun as a present from Vietnam was kept on the grounds for 12 years. During the Bakumatsu period, the site was turned over to the Tokugawa Navy as a training ground. In 1867, the shogunate erected a western-style stone building as a place for foreign diplomats to stay when visiting Edo.

After the Meiji Restoration, the site was proclaimed the "Hama Palace" (浜離宮, Hama-rikyū) by Emperor Meiji, and continued to be used as a state guest house until the construction of the Rokumeikan. In 1879, Emperor Meiji received Crown Prince Frederick William of Germany at the Hama-rikyū. Later that year, former United States president Ulysses S. Grant stayed for a month at the Hama-rikyū during his extended visit to Japan as part of his world tour. The state guest house was demolished in 1889. The gardens burned during the 1923 Great Kantō earthquake and again in March 1945 during the Tokyo air raid. In November 1945, the Hama-rikyū was transferred from the Imperial Household Agency to Tokyo Metropolis and was opened as a public garden in April 1946. In 1952, it was designated as a Special National Historic Site and also as a Special National Place of Scenic Beauty. Various teahouses have been reconstructed in the 2010s.

== Access ==
Visitors can access the garden via either of the two northern gates or via the Tokyo Cruise Ship (water bus) on a 35-minute ride from Asakusa.

Main Exit

- Tsukijishijō Station (Toei Ōedo Line) – 7 minutes walk
- Shiodome Station (Toei Ōedo Line) – 7 minutes walk
- Shiodome Station (Yurikamome Line) – 7 minutes walk
- Shimbashi Station (Toei Asakusa Line) – 12 minutes walk

Middle Exit

- Shiodome Station (Toei Ōedo Line) – 5 minutes walk
- Hamamatsuchō Station (Yamanote Line) – 15 minutes walk

Water Bus

- Tokyo Cruise Ship (Water Bus) arrives at and departs from inside the garden.

The water bus ticket includes admission to the garden.

== Gallery ==
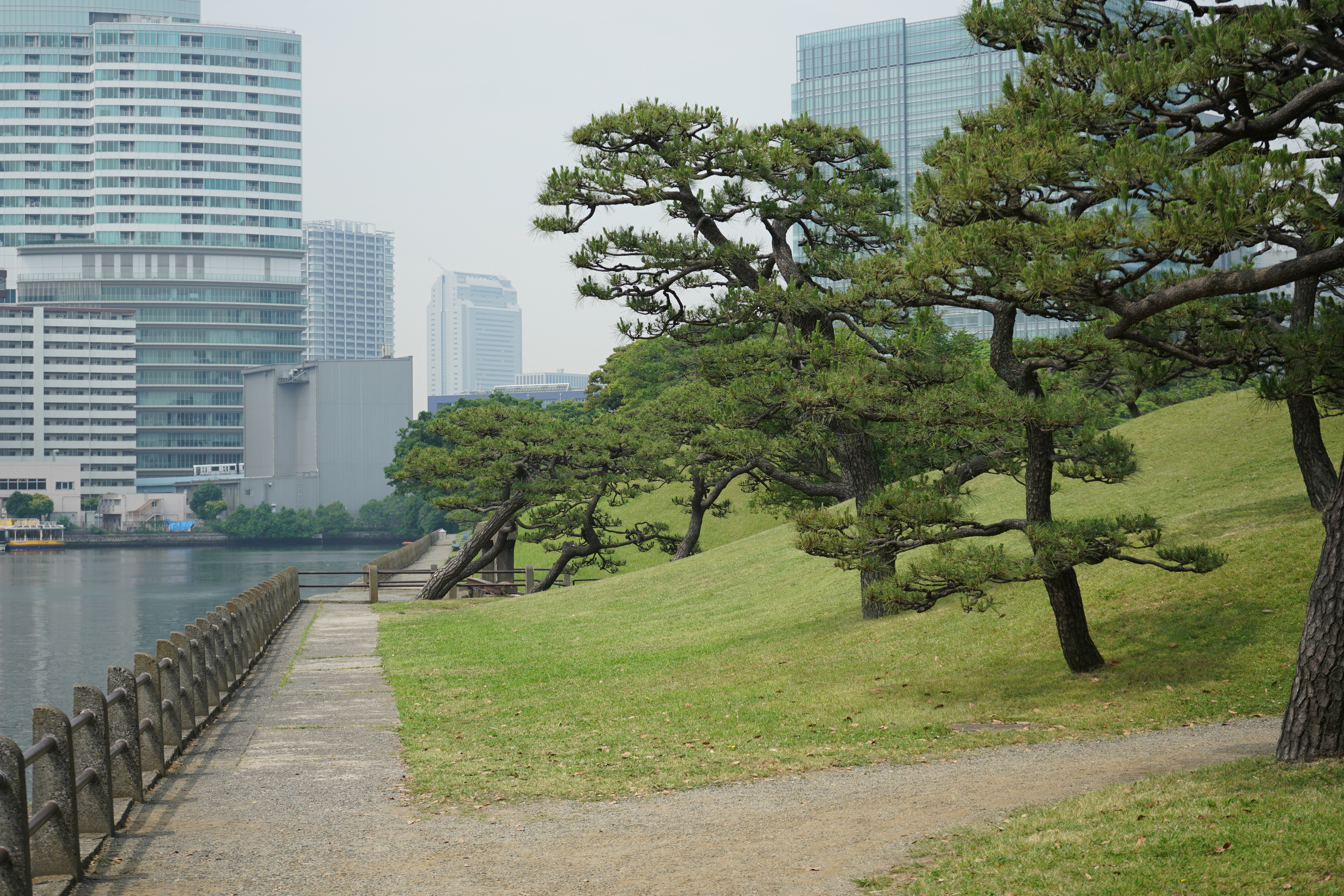
Pine trees near the water

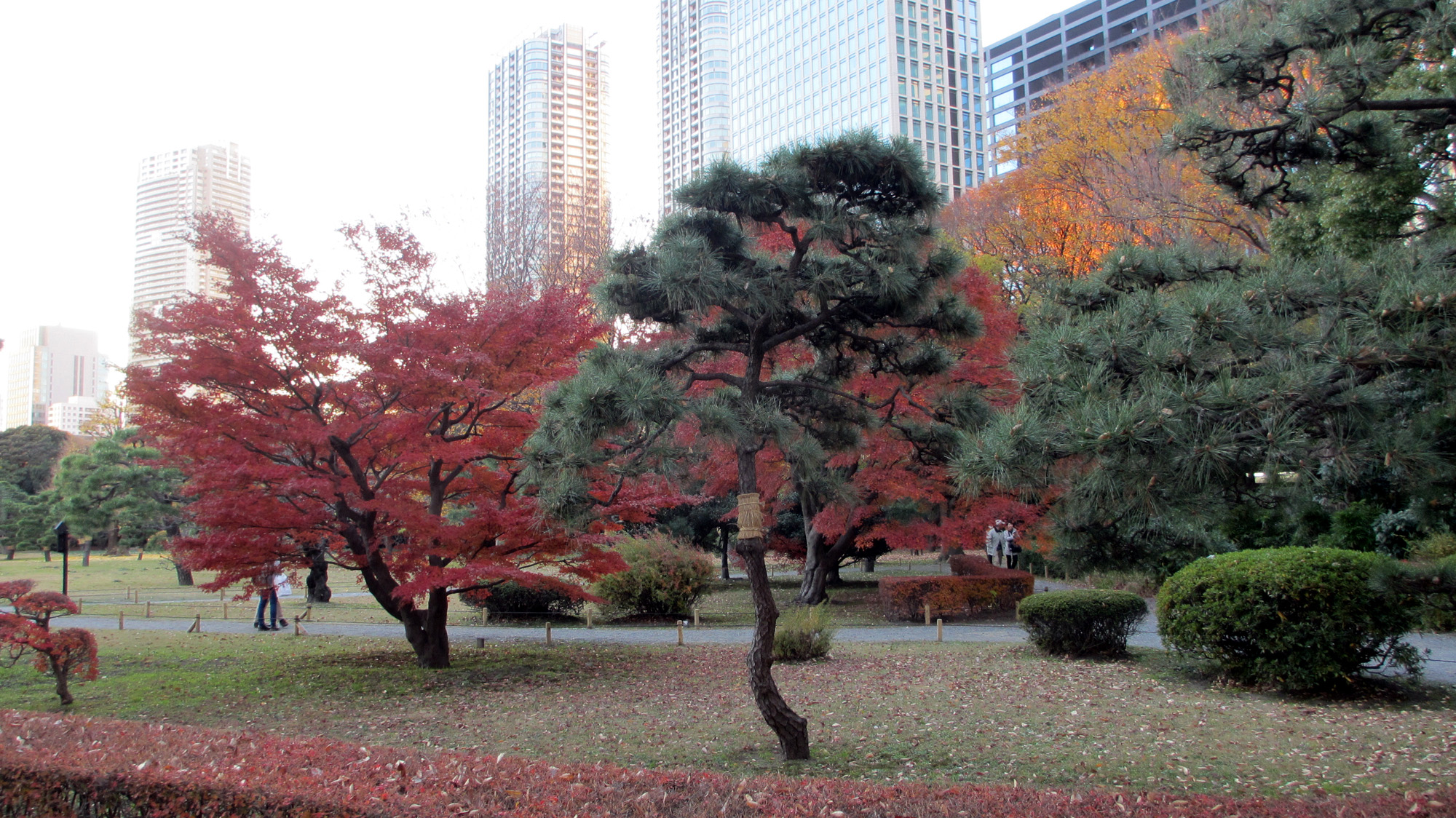
Autumn leaves

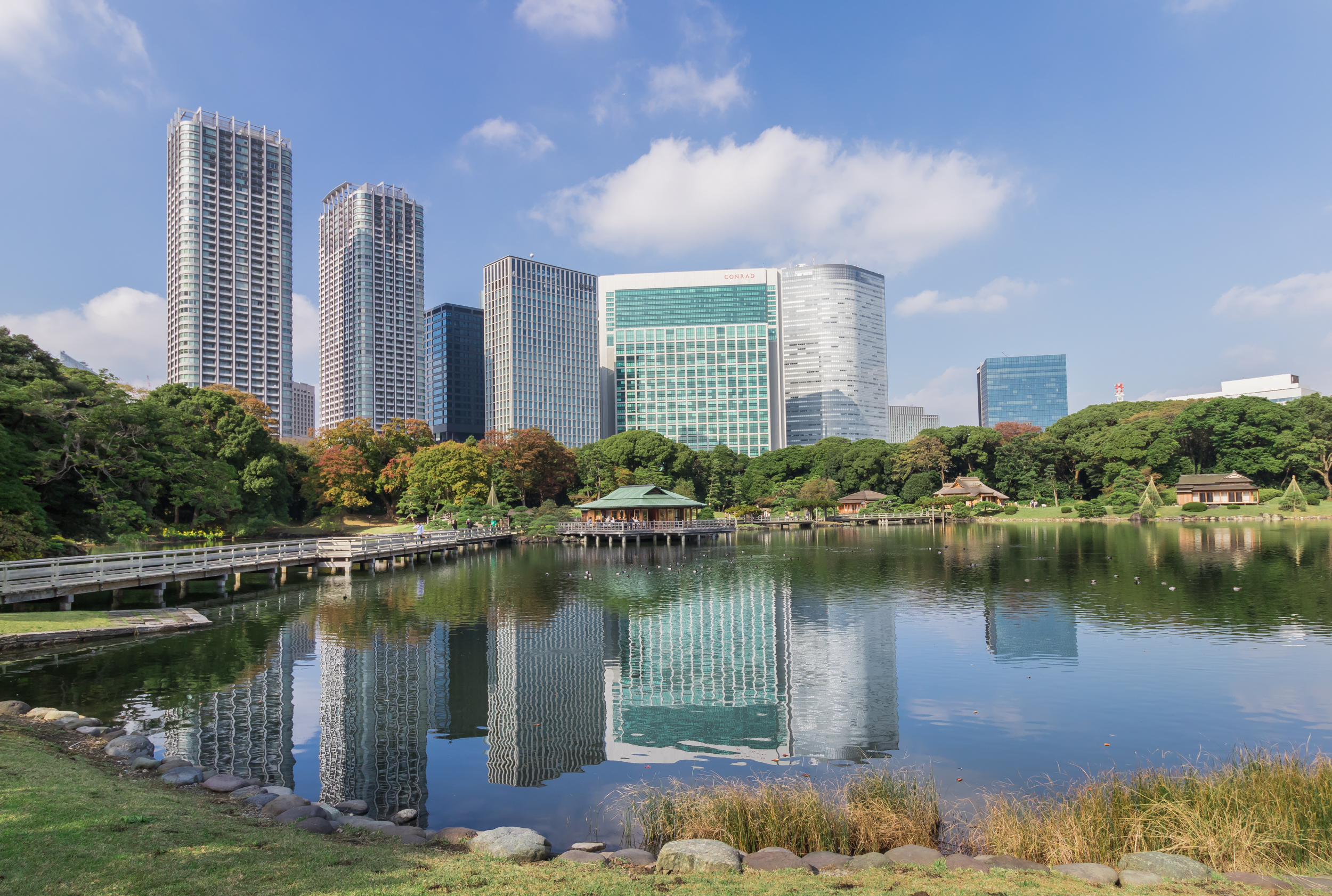
Teahouse near the seawater pond

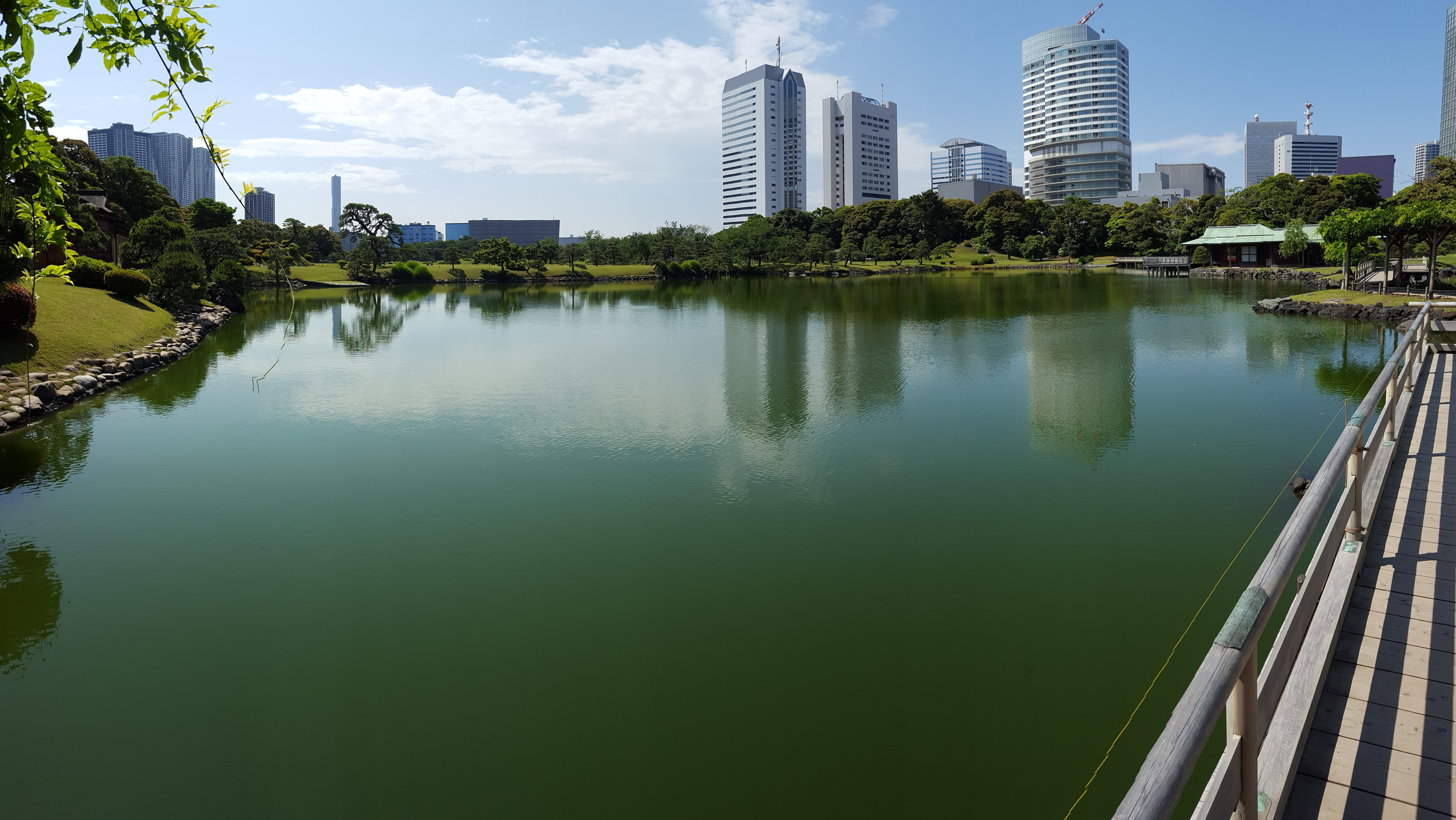
The pond

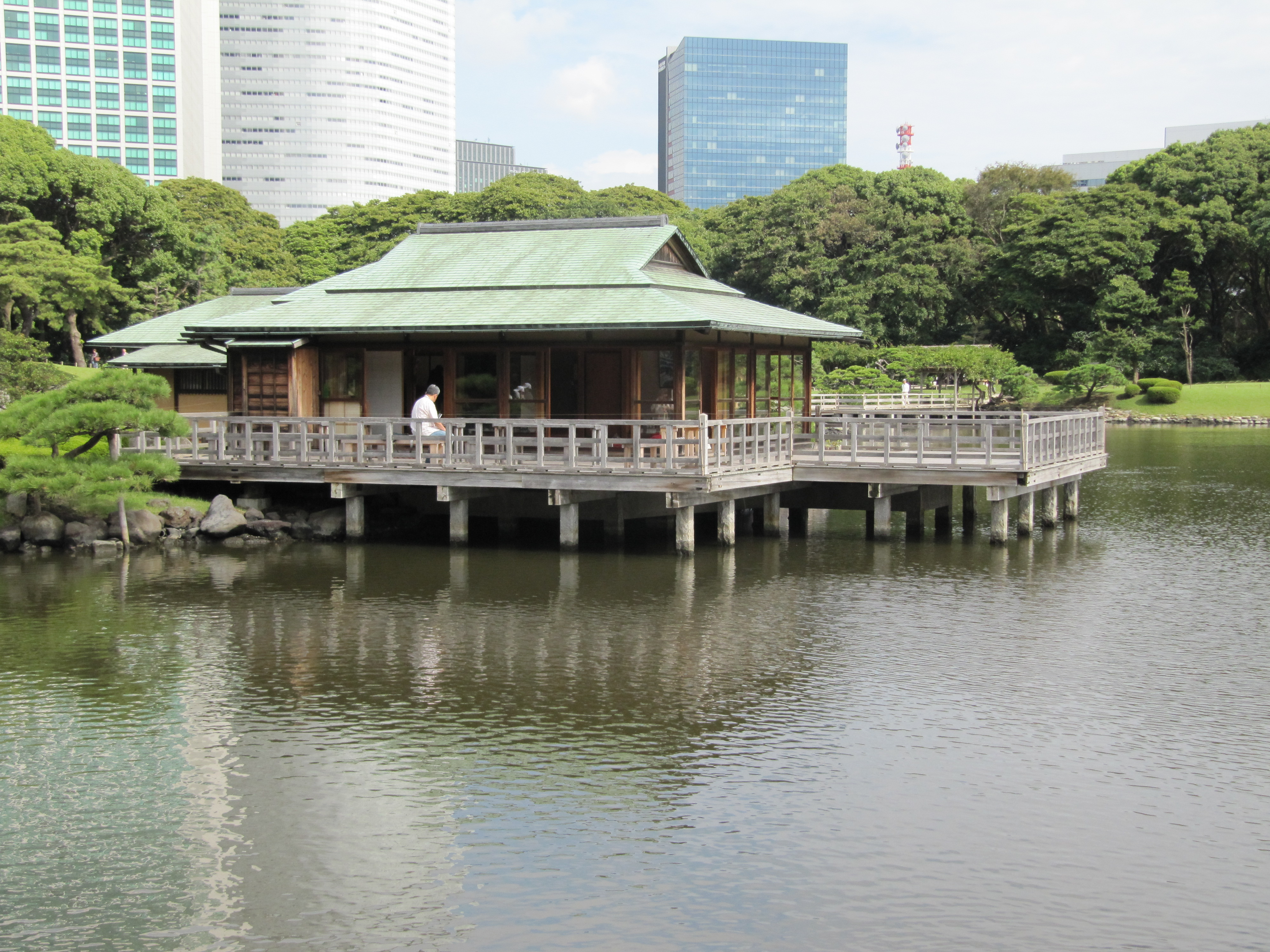

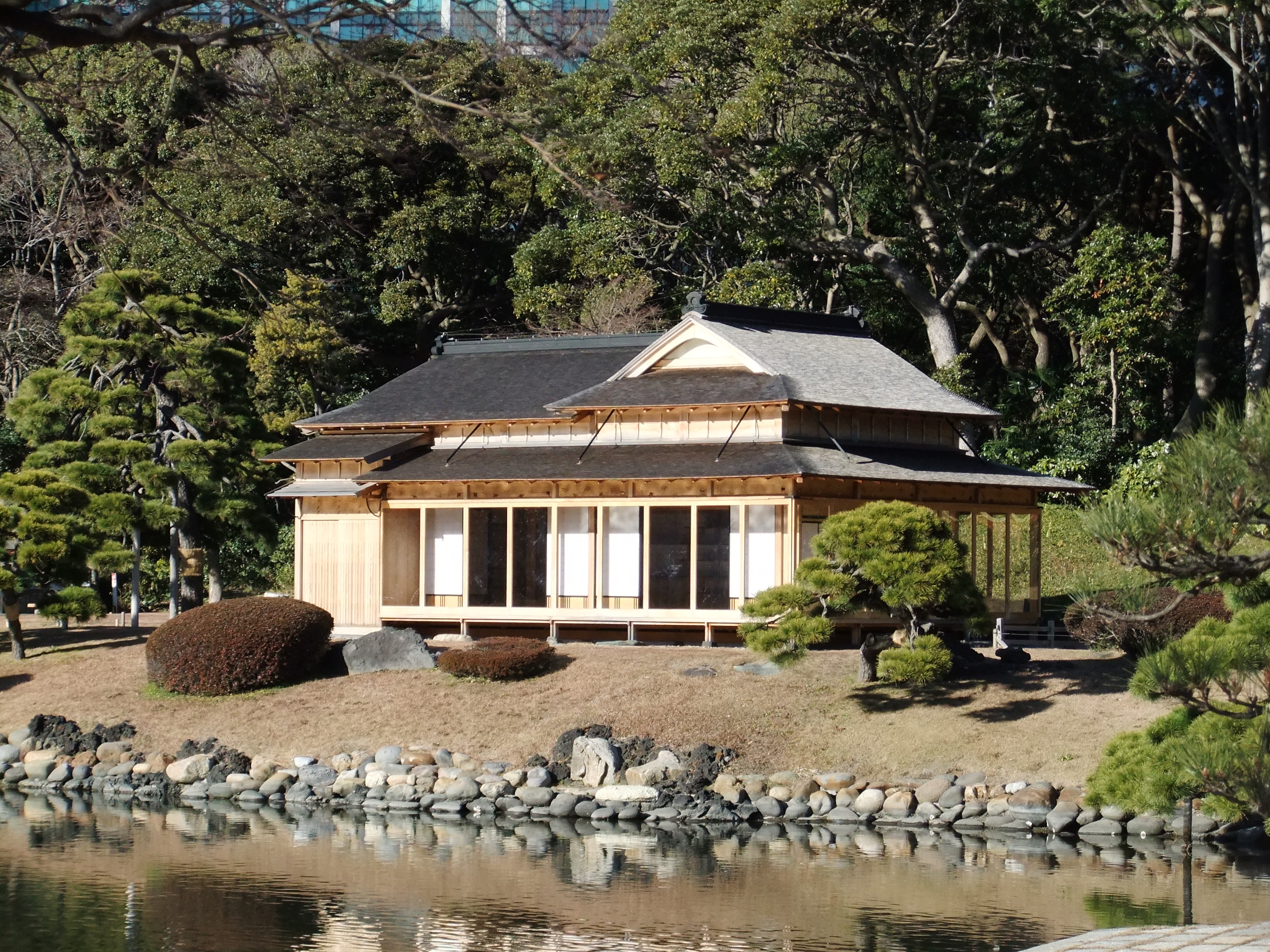

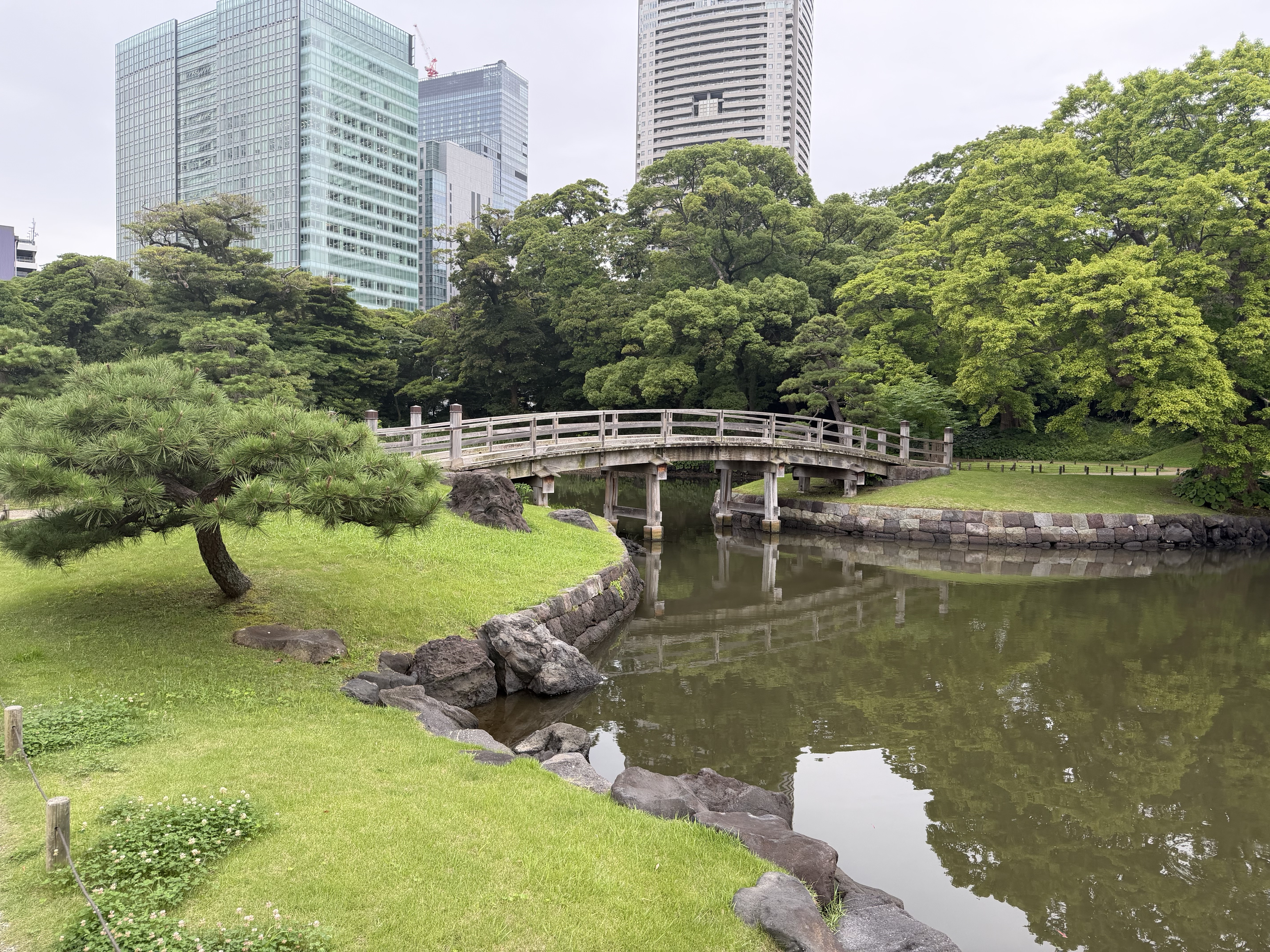
Bridge across Shioiri-no-ike Pond

== See also ==
- List of Special Places of Scenic Beauty, Special Historic Sites and Special Natural Monuments
- List of Historic Sites of Japan (Tōkyō)
- Statue of Umashimadenomikoto
