= Statue of Umashimadenomikoto =

Sculpture in Tokyo, Japan

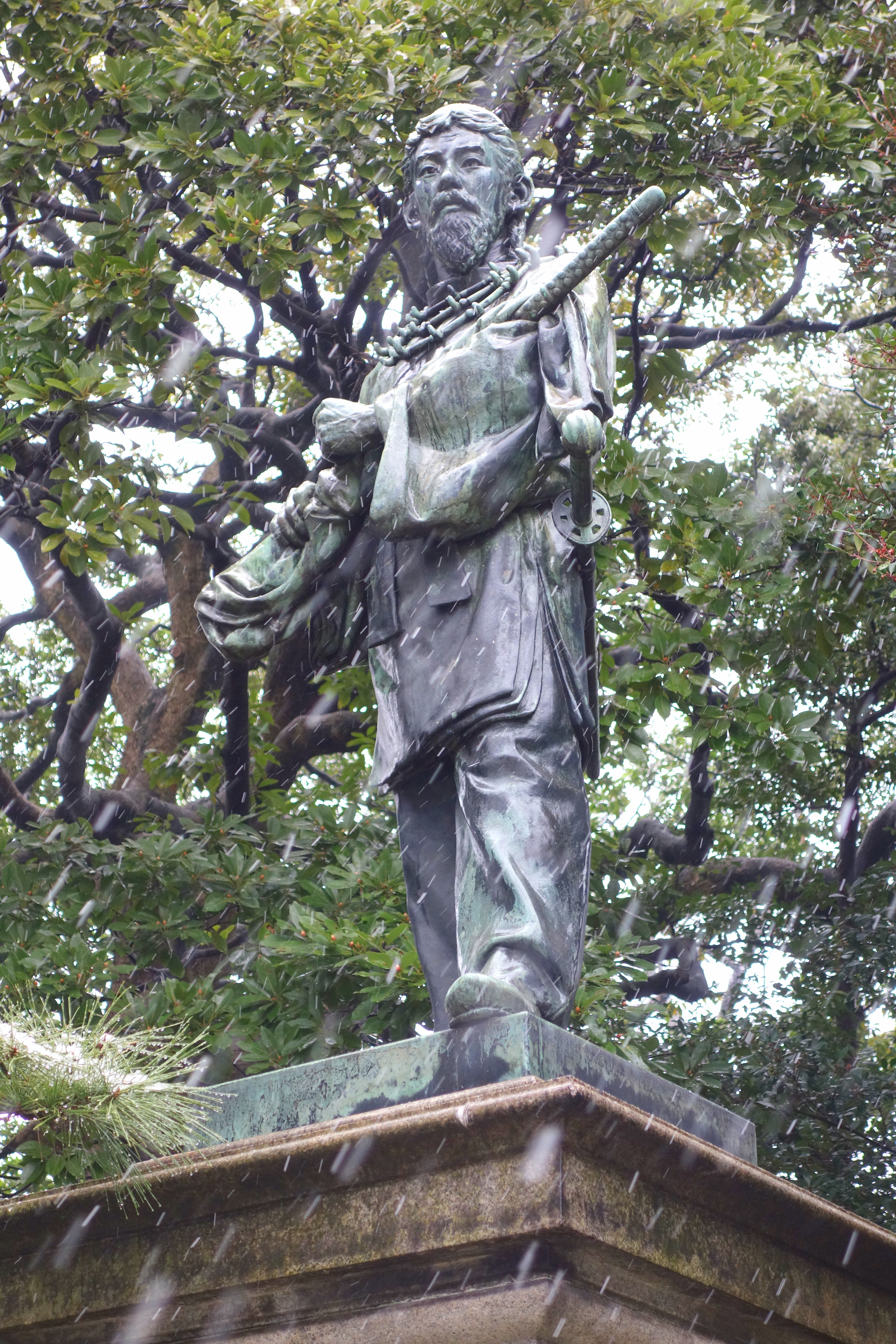
- The statue in 2014
- Location: Tokyo, Japan; 35.660245°N 139.763013°E

A statue of Umashimadenomikoto (可美真手命) by Akira Sano is installed in Tokyo's Hamarikyu Gardens, in Japan.
