= Monuments of Japan =

Legally protected Cultural Properties of Japan

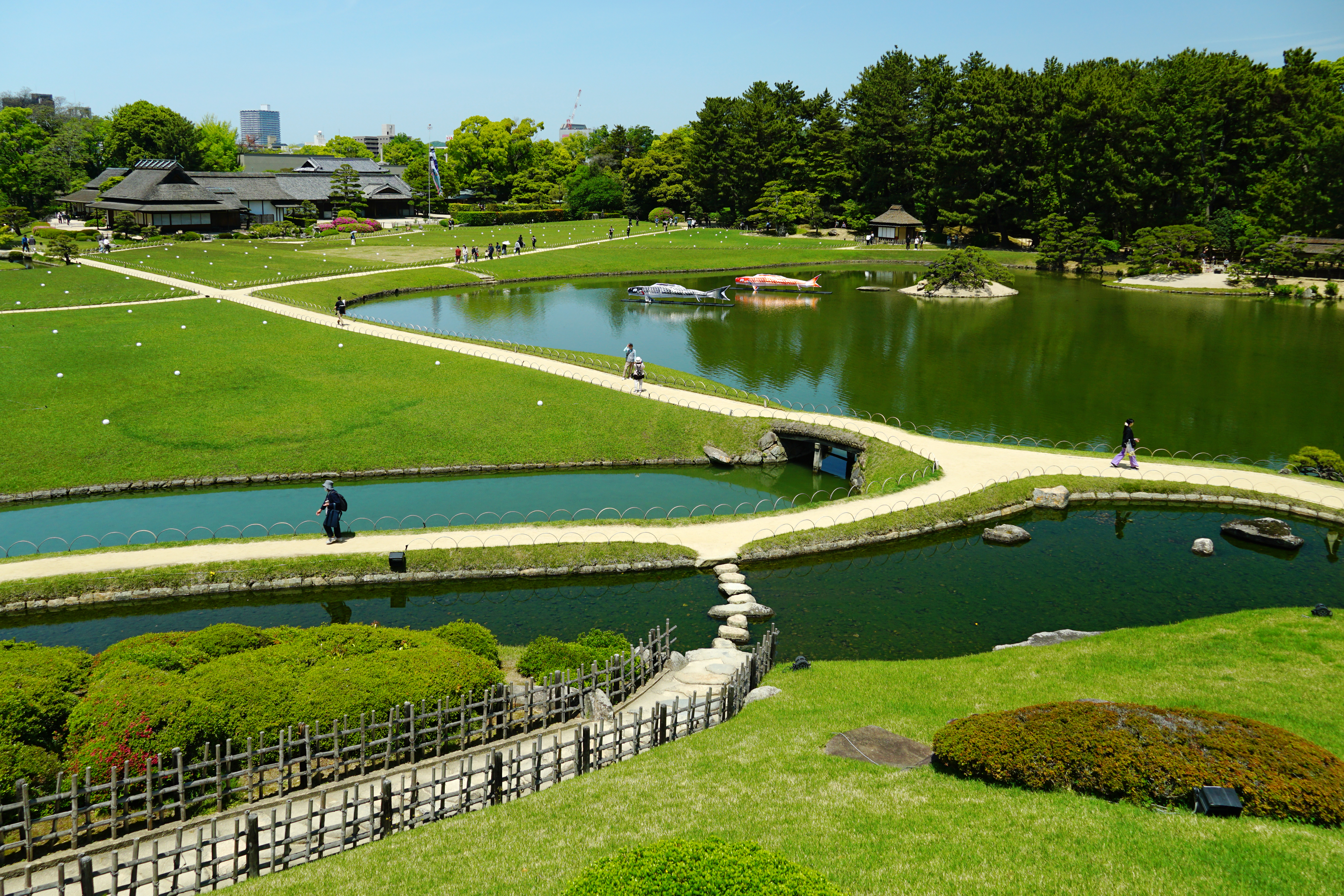
Okayama Prefecture's Kōraku-en is a designated Special Place of Scenic Beauty

Monuments (記念物, kinenbutsu) is a collective term used by the Japanese government's Law for the Protection of Cultural Properties to denote Cultural Properties of Japan (Note: In this article, capitals indicate an official designation as opposed to a simple definition, e.g "Cultural Properties" as opposed to "cultural properties".) as historic locations such as shell mounds, ancient tombs, sites of palaces, sites of forts or castles, monumental dwelling houses and other sites of high historical or scientific value; gardens, bridges, gorges, mountains, and other places of great scenic beauty; and natural features such as animals, plants, and geological or mineral formations of high scientific value.

== Designated monuments of Japan ==
The government designates (as opposed to registers) "significant" items of this kind as Cultural Properties (文化財 bunkazai) and classifies them in one of three categories:

- Historic Sites (史跡, shiseki)
- Places of Scenic Beauty (名勝, meishō),
- Natural Monuments (天然記念物, tennen kinenbutsu).

Items of particularly high significance may receive a higher classification as:

- Special Historic Sites (特別史跡, tokubetsu shiseki)
- Special Places of Scenic Beauty (特別名勝, tokubetsu meishō)
- Special Natural Monuments (特別天然記念物, tokubetsu tennen kinenbutsu), respectively.

As of February 2019, there were 3,154 nationally designated Monuments: 1,823 Historic Sites (including 62 Special Historic Sites), 415 Places of Scenic Beauty (including 36 Special Places of Scenic Beauty), and 1,030 Natural Monuments (including 75 Special Natural Monuments). Since a single property can be included within more than one of these classes, the total number of properties is less than the sum of designations: for example Hamarikyu Gardens are both a Special Historic Site and a Special Place of Scenic Beauty.

As of 1 May 2013, there were a further 2,961 Historic Sites, 266 Places of Scenic Beauty, and 2,985 Natural Monuments designated at a prefectural level and 12,840 Historic Sites, 845 Places of Scenic Beauty, and 11,020 Natural Monuments designated at a municipal level.

Alterations to the existing state of a site or activities affecting its preservation require permission from the Commissioner for Cultural Affairs. Financial support for purchasing and conserving designated land and for the utilization of the site is available through local governments.

== Designation criteria ==
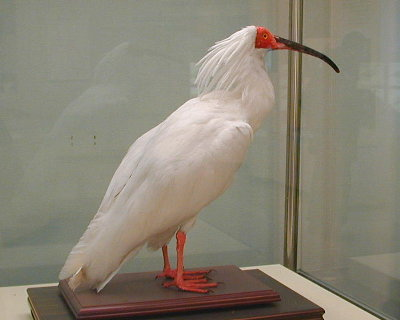
The toki is a Special Natural Monument designated under Criterion 1.2: "Animals which are not peculiar to Japan, but need to be preserved as well-known characteristic Japanese animals, and their habitat"

The Agency for Cultural Affairs designates monuments based on a number of criteria. A monument can be designated based on multiple criteria.

=== Historic Sites and Special Historic Sites ===
1. Shell mounds, settlement ruins, kofun, other historic ruins of this type
2. Ruins of fortified towns, castles, government administration offices, old battlefields and other historic ruins related to politics or government
3. Remains of shrines and temples, former compound grounds and other historic ruins related to religion
4. Schools, research institutions, cultural facilities and other historic ruins related to education, learning or culture
5. Medical care and welfare facilities, life related institution, other society and life related historic ruins
6. Transport and communication facilities, forest conservation and flood control facilities, manufacture facilities and other historic sites related to finance or manufacture activities
7. Graves and stone monuments with inscriptions
8. Former residences, gardens, ponds and other areas of particular historical significance
9. Ruins related to foreign countries or foreigners

=== Places of Scenic Beauty and Special Places of Scenic Beauty ===
1. Parks and gardens
2. Bridges and embankments
3. Flowering trees, flowering grass, autumn colors, green trees and other places of dense growth
4. Places inhabited by birds and wild animals, fish/insects and others
5. Rocks, caves
6. Ravines, gorges, waterfalls, mountain streams, abysses
7. Lakes, marshes, wetlands, floating islands, springs
8. Sand dunes, spits, seasides, islands
9. Volcanoes, onsen
10. Mountains, hills, plateaus, plains, rivers
11. Viewpoints

=== Natural Monuments and Special Natural Monuments ===
1. Animals
  1. Well-known animals peculiar to Japan and their habitat
  2. Animals which are not peculiar to Japan, but need to be preserved as well-known characteristic Japanese animals, and their habitat
  3. Animals or animal groups peculiar to Japan within their natural environment
  4. Domestic animals peculiar to Japan
  5. Well-known imported animals presently in a wild state, with the exception of domestic animals; their habitat
  6. Particularly valuable animal specimen
2. Plants, vegetation
  1. Old trees of historic interest, gigantic trees, old trees, deformed trees, cultivated pulpwood, roadside trees, shrine forests
  2. Representative primeval forests, rare forest flora
  3. Representative alpine plants, special clusters of plants on rock ground
  4. Representative clusters of waste land plants
  5. Representative examples of coastal and sand ground vegetation
  6. Representative examples of areas of peat forming plants
  7. Clusters of plants growing in caves or grottoes
  8. Rare water plants in garden ponds, onsen, lakes, marshes, streams, sea, etc.; algae, moss, microbes, etc.
  9. Remarkable occurrence of epiphytic plants on rocks, trees or shrubs
  10. Remarkable plant growth on marginal land
  11. Remarkable growth in the wild of crop plants
  12. Wild habitat of rare or near extinct plants
3. Geological and mineralogical features
  1. Rocks, mineral and fossil producing sites
  2. Conformable and unconformable strata
  3. Fold and thrust strata
  4. Geological features caused by the work of living creatures
  5. Phenomena related to earthquake dislocation and landmass motion
  6. Caves, grottoes
  7. Examples of rock organization
  8. Onsen and their sediments
  9. Erosion and weathering related phenomena
  10. Fumaroles and other items related to volcanic activity
  11. Ice and frost related phenomena
  12. Particularly precious rock, mineral and fossil specimen
4. Representative territories rich in natural monuments to be protected (Natural Protected Areas)

== Registered Monuments ==
A separate system of "registration" (as opposed to "designation" hereabove) has been established for modern edifices threatened by urban sprawl or other factors. Monuments from the Meiji period onward which require preservation can be registered as Registered Monuments (登録記念物). Members of this class of Cultural Property receive more limited assistance and protection based mostly on governmental notification and guidance. As of April 2012, 61 monuments were registered under this system.

== Some monuments of Japan ==
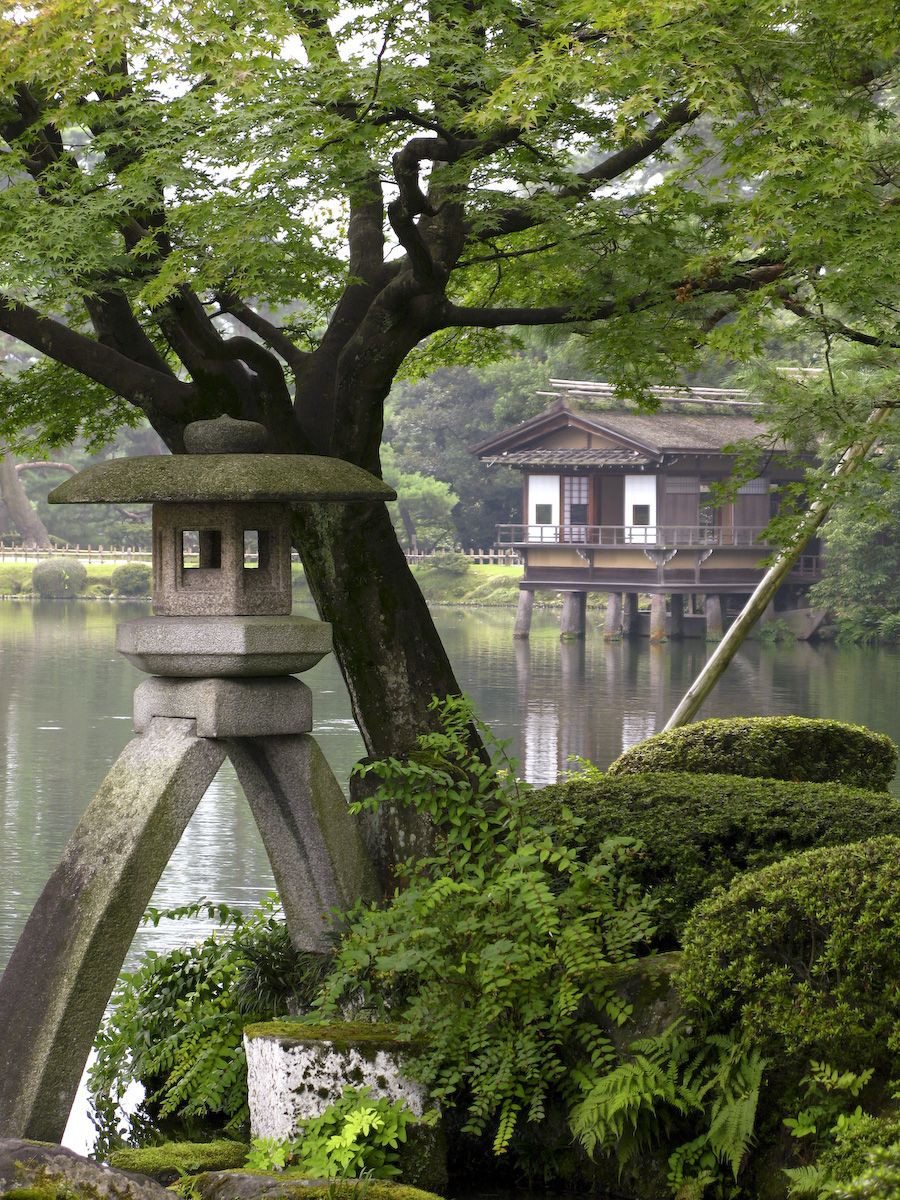
Kenroku-en, Kanazawa, Ishikawa is a Special Place of Scenic Beauty

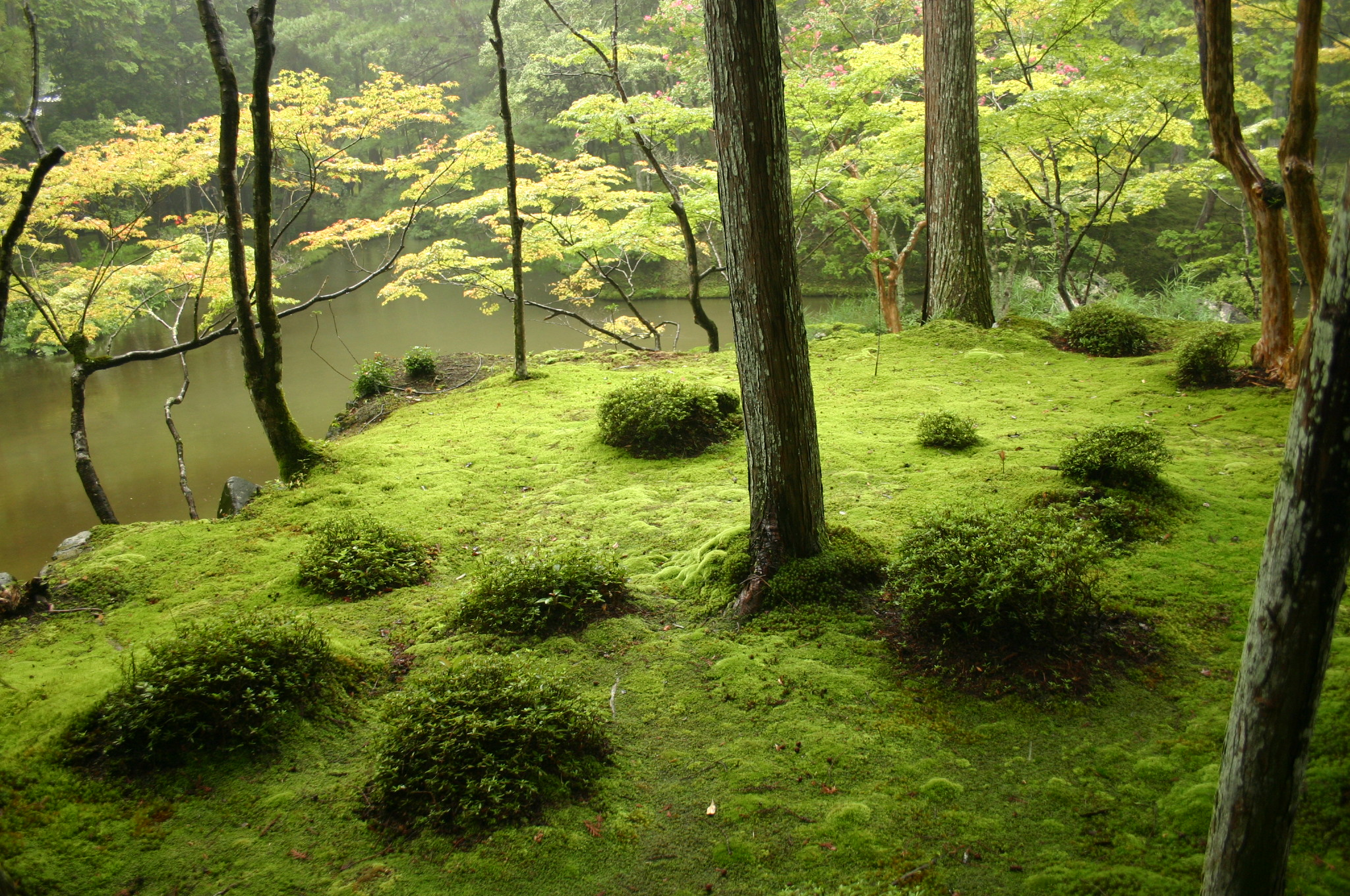
Saihō-ji's moss garden is both a Special Place of Scenic Beauty and a Historic Site

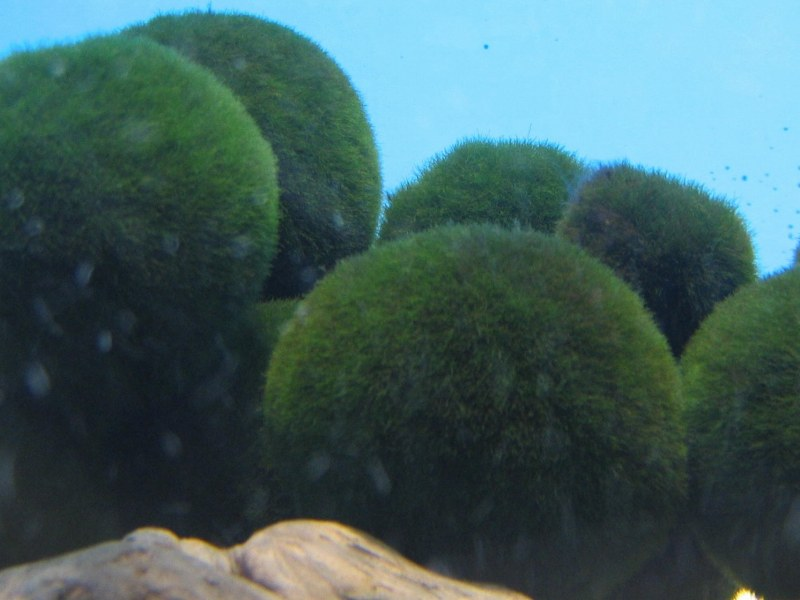
Lake Akan's seaweed cones (marimo) are a Special Natural Monument.

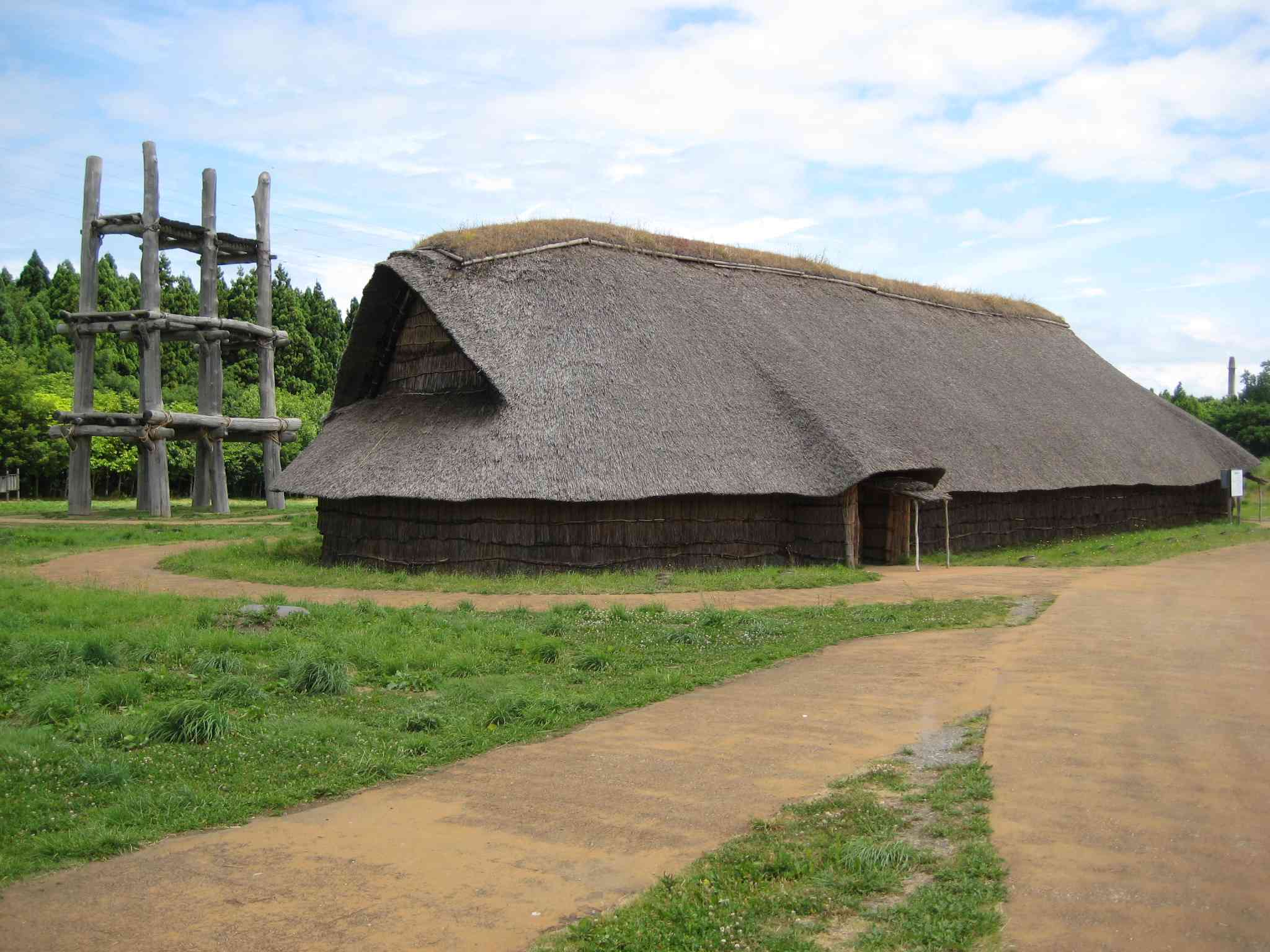
The Sannai-Maruyama Site is a Special Historic Site

== See also ==
- List of Special Places of Scenic Beauty, Special Historic Sites and Special Natural Monuments
- Cultural Properties of Japan
- Meibutsu: local specialities
