= K-CASH =

Electronic money system in South Korea

K-CASH logo.

K-CASH is an electronic money system established by 'Korea Financial Telecommunication and Clearings Institute'.

K-CASH card is easily obtained from issuing bank. Several banks are issuing K-CASH card, including two credit card companies as of 2011. Users can load or unload value from their own account at bank counter, store, ATMs and online. Unlike other market dominant "transport cards", unloading K-CASH value to owner's account is done real-time, as a law only permits real-time transaction to electronic money, not to prepaid card.

South Korean Army, and Chuncheon, Hoengseong, Wonju buses adopt K-CASH as a major payment system. At first, K-CASH was mainly promoted as electronic fare collection system. Despite its advantage, such as bank guarantees its payment or real-time transaction, market dominant systems like T-money or Mybi/Cashbee system drive it out of the market. As of November 2011, following cities and railroad systems are using K-CASH as their public transport fare collecting system.

== Issuing Bank ==
Issuers: Small Business Bank (select branches) - Nonghyup (Chuncheon, Wonju, Hwaseong) - Daegu Bank - Woori Bank (nationwide) - Shinhan Bank (nationwide) - SC First Bank (Chuncheon, Wonju, Hwaseong) - Cash IC cards with K-Cash function can be issued by Samsung Group employees, and employee cards issued by Samsung Card until August 2009 included K-Cash function, but it is currently not available. Banks that have K-Cash as standard on their cash IC cards and can be issued without additional fees and procedures include Shinhan Bank and Woori Bank, but Shinhan Bank requires you to select the Smart One debit card type, not the Smart One T-Money type, to receive K-Cash. KB Kookmin Bank issues K-Cash on some of its credit and debit cards.

== Card issuers ==
- Citibank Korea (discontinued)
- Daegu Bank: Andong (discontinued)
- Hana Bank: Chuncheon, Wonju (discontinued)
- Industrial Bank of Korea (discontinued)
- Kookmin Bank/Kookmin Card (discontinued)
- Samsung Card (discontinued)
- Standard Chartered Korea: Chuncheon, Hoengseong, Wonju
- Shinhan Bank/Shinhan Card: all branches (discontinued)
- Woori Bank: all branches, including Kaesong Industrial Zone (discontinued)
