= Shinhan Bank =

South Korean bank

Shinhan Bank Co., Ltd.

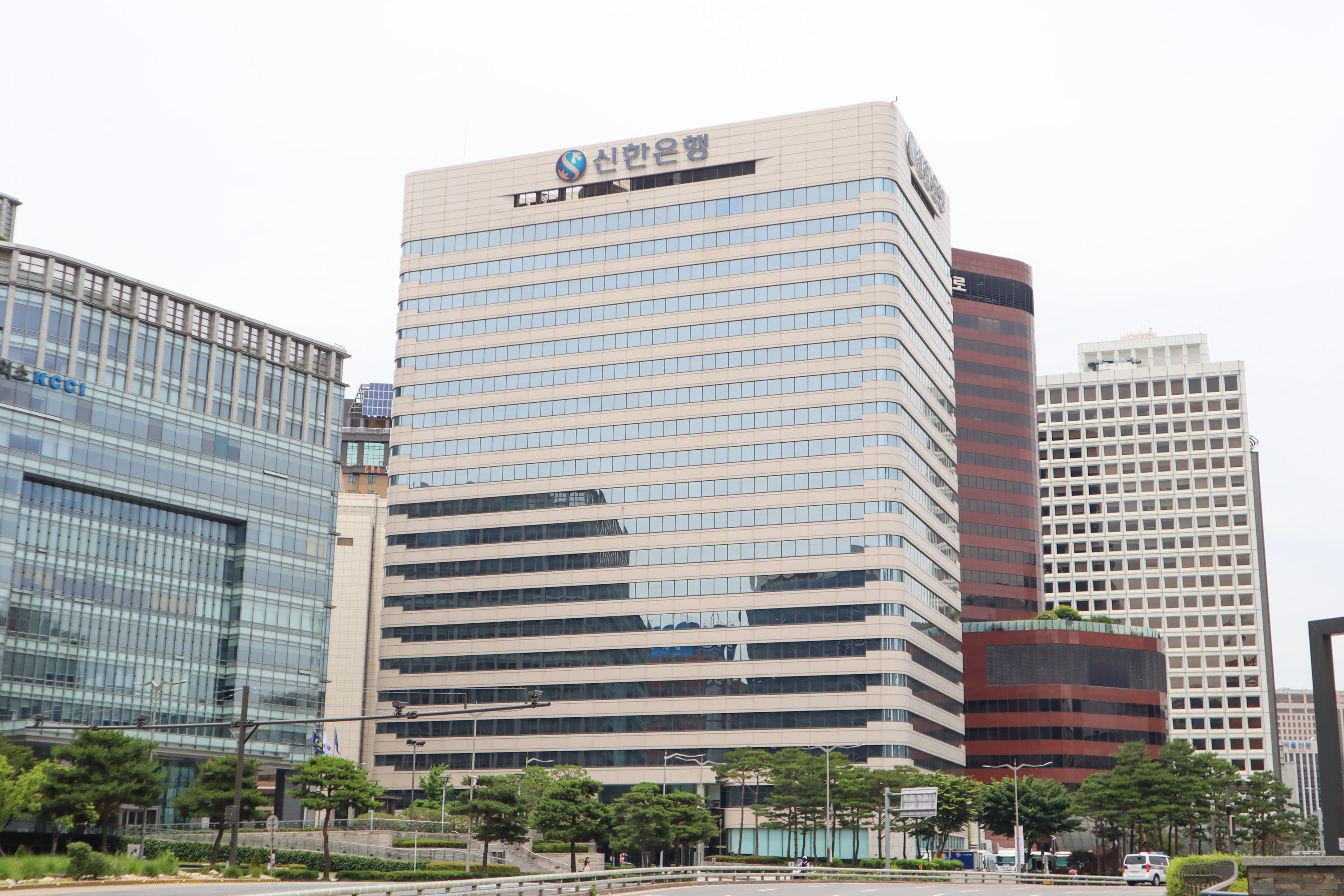
- Shinhan Bank Headquarters, Seoul in 2019
- Native name: 신한은행
- Type: Subsidiary
- Industry: Financial services
- Predecessor: Chohung Bank
- Founded: July 7, 1982; 44 years ago
- Headquarters: Jung-gu, Seoul, South Korea
- Area served: South Korean and worldwide
- Products: Retail banking; corporate banking; investment banking; insurance; private banking; private equity; mortgage loans; credit cards; investment management; wealth management; asset management; mutual funds; exchange-traded funds; index funds
- Parent: Shinhan Financial Group
- Website: www.shinhanglobal.com/global.shinhan

- Shinhan Bank
- Hangul: 신한은행
- Hanja: 新韓銀行
- Lit.: New Korea Bank
- RR: Sinhan eunhaeng
- MR: Sinhan ŭnhaeng

Shinhan Bank Co., Ltd. (Korean: 신한은행) is a South Korean bank headquartered in Seoul. It was founded under this name in 1982, but through its merger with Chohung Bank in 2006, traces its origins to the Hanseong Bank (est. 1897), one of the first banks to be established in Korea. It is part of the Shinhan Financial Group, along with Jeju Bank.

As of 2016, Shinhan Bank had total assets of ₩298.945 trillion (equivalent to ₩363.933 trillion or US$271.536 billion in 2025), total deposits of ₩221.047 trillion (equivalent to ₩269.101 trillion or US$200.78 billion in 2025) and loans of ₩212.228 trillion (equivalent to ₩258.365 trillion or US$192.77 billion in 2025). Shinhan Bank is the main subsidiary of Shinhan Financial Group (SFG).

== History ==
With capital provided by Korean businessmen residing in Japan, Lee Hee-gun founded Shinhan Bank on 7 July 1982 as a small venture with a capital stock of KRW 25.0 billion, 279 employees, and three branches; Kim Se-chang became its first president.

In August 2003, Shinhan Financial Group acquired more than 80 percent of shares in Chohung Bank, the successor entity of Hanseong Bank founded in 1897, and raised its stake to 100 percent in June 2004. At the time, Shinhan and Chohung were respectively fourth- and fifth-largest by assets in Korea's banking market, and their combination created the country's second-largest banking group, behind Kookmin Bank and ahead of Woori Bank and Hana Bank.

On 1 April 2006, Shinhan Bank and Chohung Bank merged into a single legal entity. Because of the prestige associated with Chohung Bank's history, the transaction was engineered so that it was Chohung that absorbed Shinhan and subsequently renamed itself Shinhan Bank.

In March 2013, the Financial Services Commission of South Korea said that Shinhan Bank reported that its Internet banking servers had been temporarily blocked. The South Korean government asserted a North Korean link in the March cyberattacks, which has been denied by Pyongyang.

== In Vietnam ==
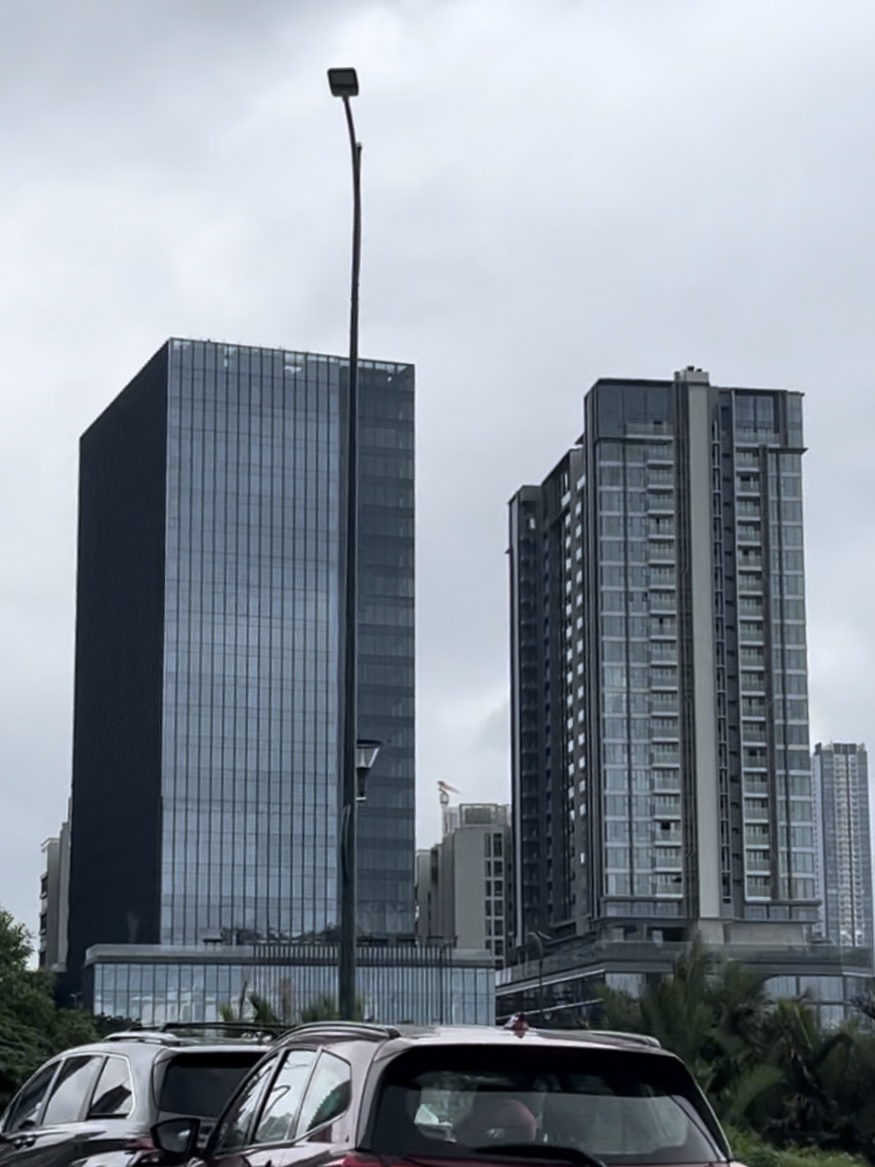
Shinhan Bank Vietnam branch head office currently located at The MeTT Building (left one) in 15 Trần Bạch Đằng Street, Thủ Thiêm, Thủ Đức

Shinhan officially established its Ho Chi Minh City branch in December 1994, becoming the first Korean bank to establish a branch in Vietnam.

In the 2008-2009 period, Shinhan Bank was licensed to become one of the five banks with 100% foreign capital. In 2011, the bank merged with Shinhan Vina Bank to become Shinhan Vietnam Bank - the foreign bank with the highest charter capital at the time.

In 2017, Shinhan Bank acquired the retail segment of ANZ Vietnam Bank. In early 2020, Shinhan Vietnam Bank was rated BBB (stable) in the long term by international credit rating agency Standard & Poor's (S&P).

According to S&P's assessment, Shinhan Vietnam Bank plays an indispensable role in Shinhan Financial Group's (Shinhan Financial Group - SFG) global business expansion goals. At the same time, in November 2020, Shinhan Vietnam Bank officially announced the implementation of Basel II Pillar 2 on capital adequacy assessment processes.

== See also ==
- List of South Korean companies
- List of banks in South Korea
- Big Four (banking)
- Incheon Shinhan Bank S-Birds
