= Hanil Bank =

Former bank in Korea

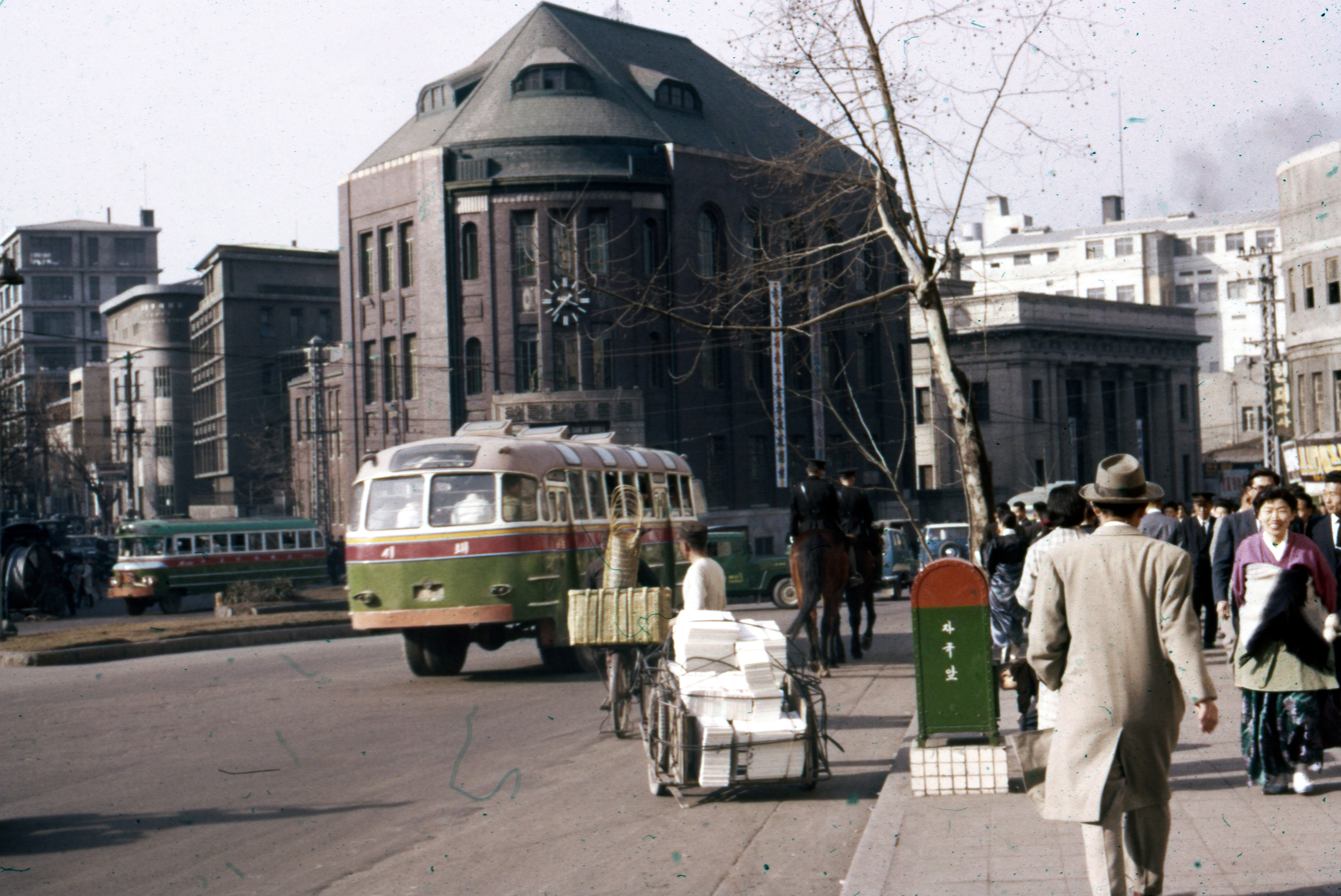
March 1960 photograph showing the head office of Korea Commercial Bank (center) and the former head office of Korea Trade and Industry Bank, by then a branch of Hanil Bank (low-rise building, right) on Namdaemunro

The Hanil Bank (Korean: 한일은행) was a financial institution first established in Korea under Japanese rule, initially as Chōsen Trust (조선신탁, 1932-1946) then renamed Joseon Trust Bank (조선신탁은행, 1946-1950) and Korea Trust Bank (한국신탁은행, 1950-1954) in South Korea. In 1954, it merged with Korea Trade and Industry Bank (한국상공은행, est. 1936 as Chōsen Central Mujin Company 조선무진) and renamed itself again as Korea Heungup Bank (한국흥업은행), then Hanil Bank in 1960. The latter name alludes to respective names in Korean of Korea and Japan, and has therefore sometimes been rendered in English as Korea–Japan Bank.

It should not be confused with an earlier Korean bank of the same name, active between 1906 and 1931 and a predecessor entity of Chohung Bank.

== Under Japanese rule ==
Chōsen Trust was created in December 1932 at the initiative of the Governor-General of Chōsen, with initial capital provided by the Bank of Chōsen and the Chōsen Industrial Bank (30 percent each) as well as Dong-il Bank, Honam Bank, and several individual Japanese and Korean businesspeople.

== In South Korea ==
With the division of Korea, as with other banks previously controlled by Japanese interests, the respective operations of Chōsen Trust were taken over by public authorities on both sides of the 38th parallel. In North Korea, they were soon merged into the central bank within the country's monobank system.

In South Korea, the renamed Korea Heungup Bank was privatized in 1958 and acquired by Samsung C&T Corporation. Like other Korean commercial banks, however, it was nationalized in 1962 following the May 16 coup, as the military government expropriated large shareholders on the premise that their wealth had been amassed illicitly.

In 1979, the president of Hanil Bank was placed under criminal investigation in connection with the bankruptcy of Yulsan Group.

In 1981, Hanil Bank was again privatized. Its privatization was part of a limited financial liberalization effort undertaken by then-president Chun Doo-hwan. Hanil Bank was chosen because it was deemed the best-managed of the four major commercial banks under government ownership (the others being Chohung Bank, Korea First Bank, and Seoul Trust Bank), and thus the one with the most promising prospects for rapid privatization. The government divestiture was announced in April 1981 and completed in June.

In 1984, Hanil Bank established Hanil Lease and acquired Hanil Securities in 1985. By the mid-1990s, it was one of the five most prominent Korean banks, together with Chohung Bank, Korea Commercial Bank, Korea First Bank, and Seoul Bank.

On 31 July 1999, under financial stress following the 1997 Asian financial crisis, Hanil Bank announced its merger with Korea Commercial Bank, with simultaneous public recapitalization that resulted in the government holding a 95-percent equity stake in the merged entity. The merger was completed in 1999. The merged entity, initially called Hanvit Bank (sometimes transcribed as Hanbit), was renamed to Woori Bank in 2002.

The Hanil Bank head office building was located on Namdaemunro, between the respective former seats of Korea Commercial Bank and Korea Industrial Bank (later Korea Development Bank). It was reconstructed in the late 1970s and eventually sold in 2002 to the Lotte Group which used it for an extension of the central Lotte Department Store, branded as AvenueL.

== See also ==
- Chōsen Industrial Bank
- List of banks in South Korea
