= Chōsen Industrial Bank =

1918–1950 bank in Korea

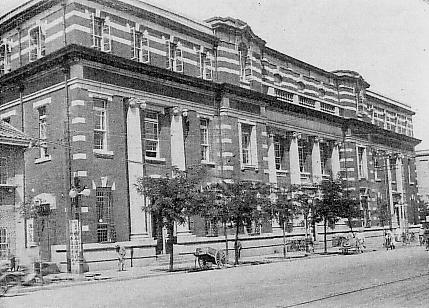
Head office of the Chōsen Industrial Bank in Keijō, Korea, Empire of Japan

The Chōsen Industrial Bank (Japanese: 朝鮮殖産銀行 Chōsen Shokusan Ginkō, Korean: 조선식산은행 Joseon Siksan Eunhaeng), also referred to as Chosen Colonization Bank or Joseon Industrial Bank, was a major financial institution in Korea under Japanese rule and its immediate aftermath. It was formed in 1918 by merging six banks established under the Korean Empire. In 1950, it was renamed the Korea Industrial Bank (한국식산은행, not to be confused with the later Industrial Bank of Korea), and eventually liquidated in 1954 with its viable operations transferred to the newly created Korea Development Bank.

== Overview ==
In 1906, at the initiative of its Japanese financial adviser Megata Tanetarō, the Korean Empire decreed the establishment of agricultural and industrial banks to stimulate the country's economy. 11 such banks had been established on a local basis by 1908, including the Hanseong Agricultural and Industrial Bank (한성농공은행) in what is now Seoul. That year, they were merged into six establishments. In June 1918, the six banks were merged into the Chōsen Industrial Bank by the Japanese colonial authorities. Together with the Bank of Chōsen, it was used to channel cheap credit to activities favored by the colonial government. By 1924 it had 47 offices across the country and over 400 employees, making it the largest bank in colonial Korea.

The Chōsen Industrial Bank has been viewed as one of the two main instruments of economic domination of Korea by Japan during the colonial period, together with the Oriental Development Company, with its symbolic salience enhanced after 1924 by the forced relocation of the Bank of Chōsen's head office from Keijō to Tokyo. As such, it was a target for activists of the Korean independence movement. A famed episode was when Na Seok-ju threw a bomb at the bank's Seoul head office in late 1926.

The Chōsen Industrial Bank had a comparatively higher share of Korean employees in its workforce than the Bank of Chōsen: by 1928, Koreans were 254 out of 794 total staff at the former, or 32 percent, against 55 out of 342 staff at the latter (16 percent). Also unlike the Bank of Chōsen, the Chōsen Industrial Bank offered equal treatment to its Korean and Japanese employees.

In 1936, the Chōsen Industrial Bank took over the Korean operations of Japan's Eighteenth Bank. In 1942, it was designated as an agency for the Japanese War Treasury's lending business in Korea. By 1943, it had 498 employees, of which 150 (30 percent) were Koreans.

In 1945, the United States Army Military Government in Korea took over the bank's management; its Japanese branch was liquidated by order of Supreme Commander for the Allied Powers Douglas MacArthur in October 1945. The relatively high share of Koreans in the staff and management ensured a smoother postwar transition than in other Japanese colonial enterprises, even allowing the Joseon Industrial Bank, as it was now transcribed, to lobby (unsuccessfully) for taking over monetary authority from the Bank of Joseon. In 1948, the ownership and management of the bank was taken over by the newly established government of Korea.

In February 1950, the bank was renamed the Korea Industrial Bank. On 1 April 1954, the Korea Industrial Bank was liquidated by presidential decree No. 859, with its central operations transferred to the Korea Development Bank (KDB) while branches were taken over by the Korea Savings Bank (subsequently Korea First Bank, later Standard Chartered Korea). The liquidation was eventually completed in April 1982.

== Buildings ==
The bank's head office was first built on the capital’s major thoroughfare fare now known as Namdaemunno in the 1910s, and expanded in 1920-1922. After 1954 it was used as head office by KDB. It was demolished in 1983, for redevelopment of its site as the main branch of Lotte Department Store.

The Chōsen Industrial Bank had an extensive network of branches across Korea. Some of these were inherited from predecessor organizations: for example, the bank's branch in Gimcheon was established in 1909 by the Daegu Agricultural and Industrial Bank, itself created in 1906. In Daegu itself, a new branch building was erected in 1931-1932 and used by the Industrial Bank, then by KDB until 2008. After renovation, it has hosted the Daegu Modern History Museum since 2011.

Other branches included those in Busan, built on sloped terrain in the Japanese-oriented port area, and the branch in Chungju, built in 1933 and whose building is still extant.

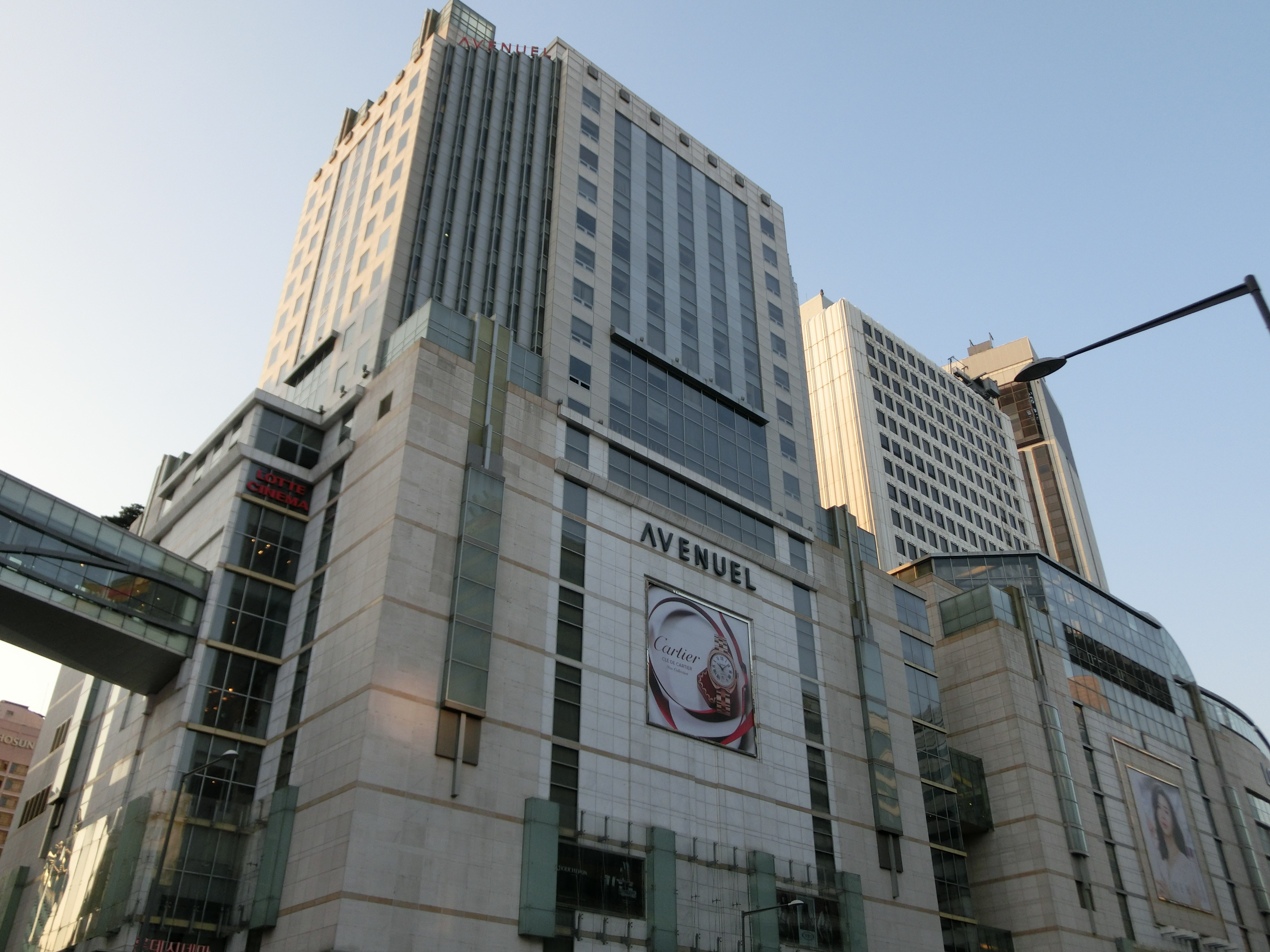
Lotte Department Store on the site of the bank's former head office

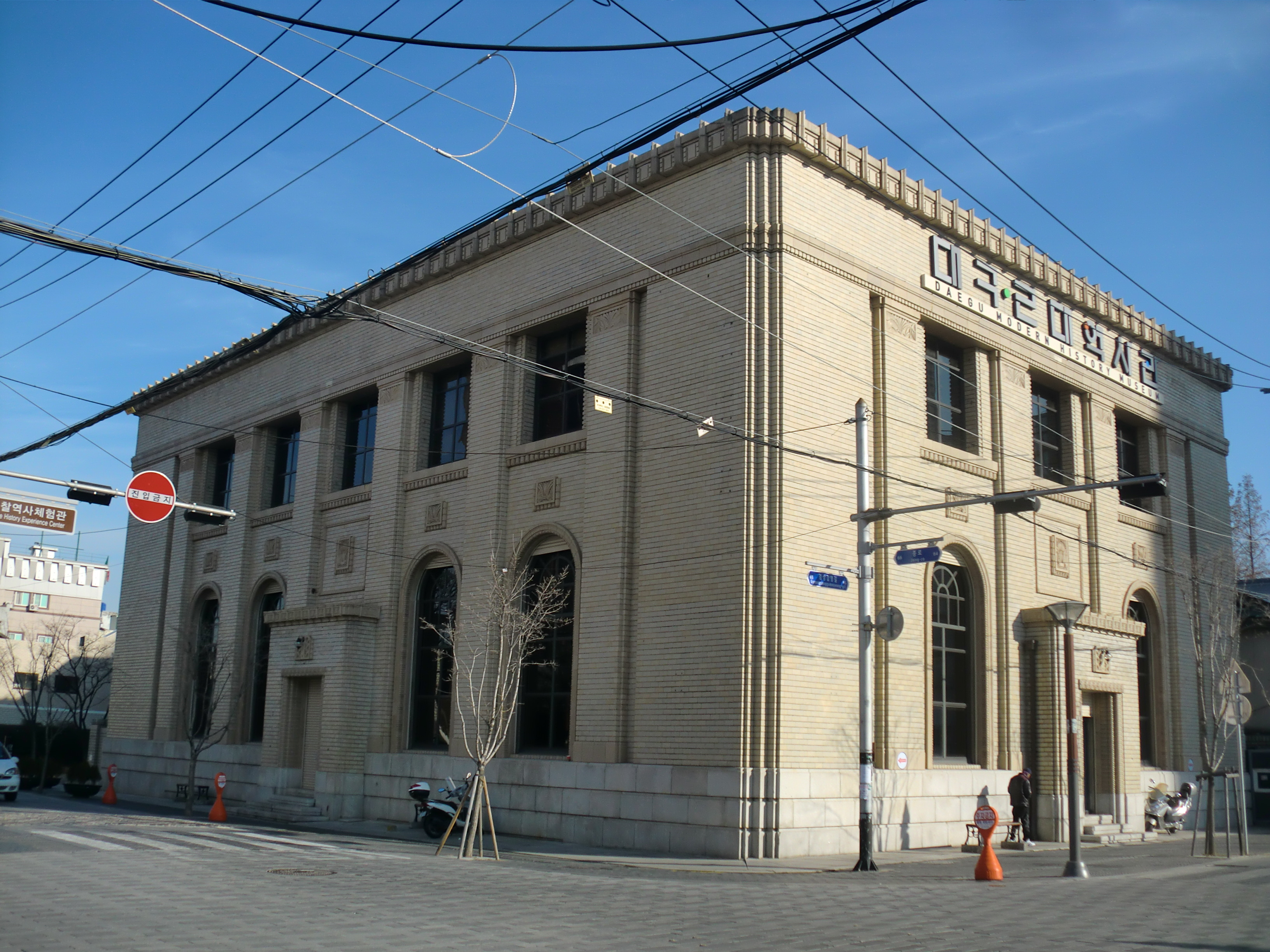
Former branch in Daegu, since 2011 the Daegu Modern History Museum

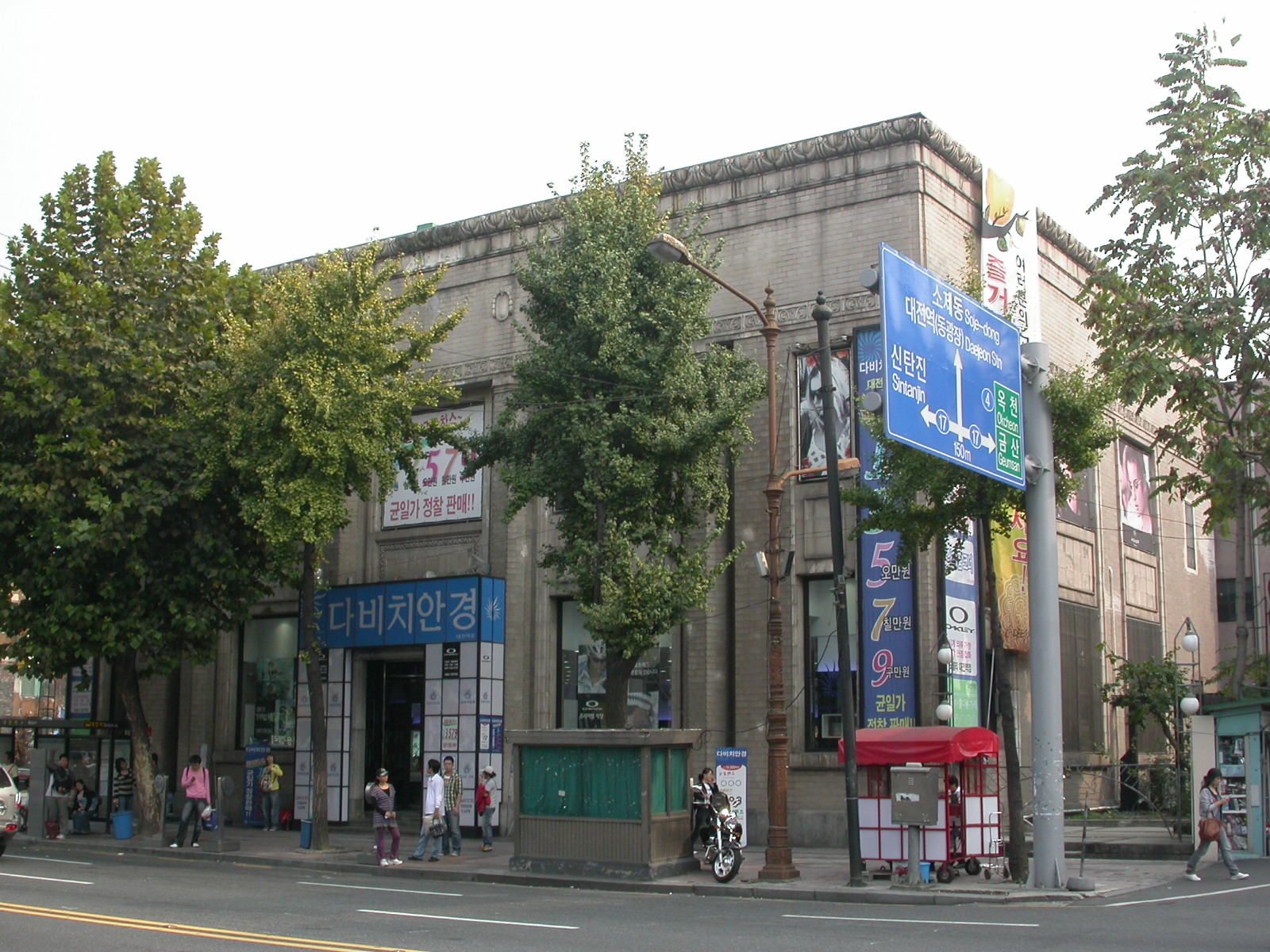
Former branch in Daejeon, built in 1937

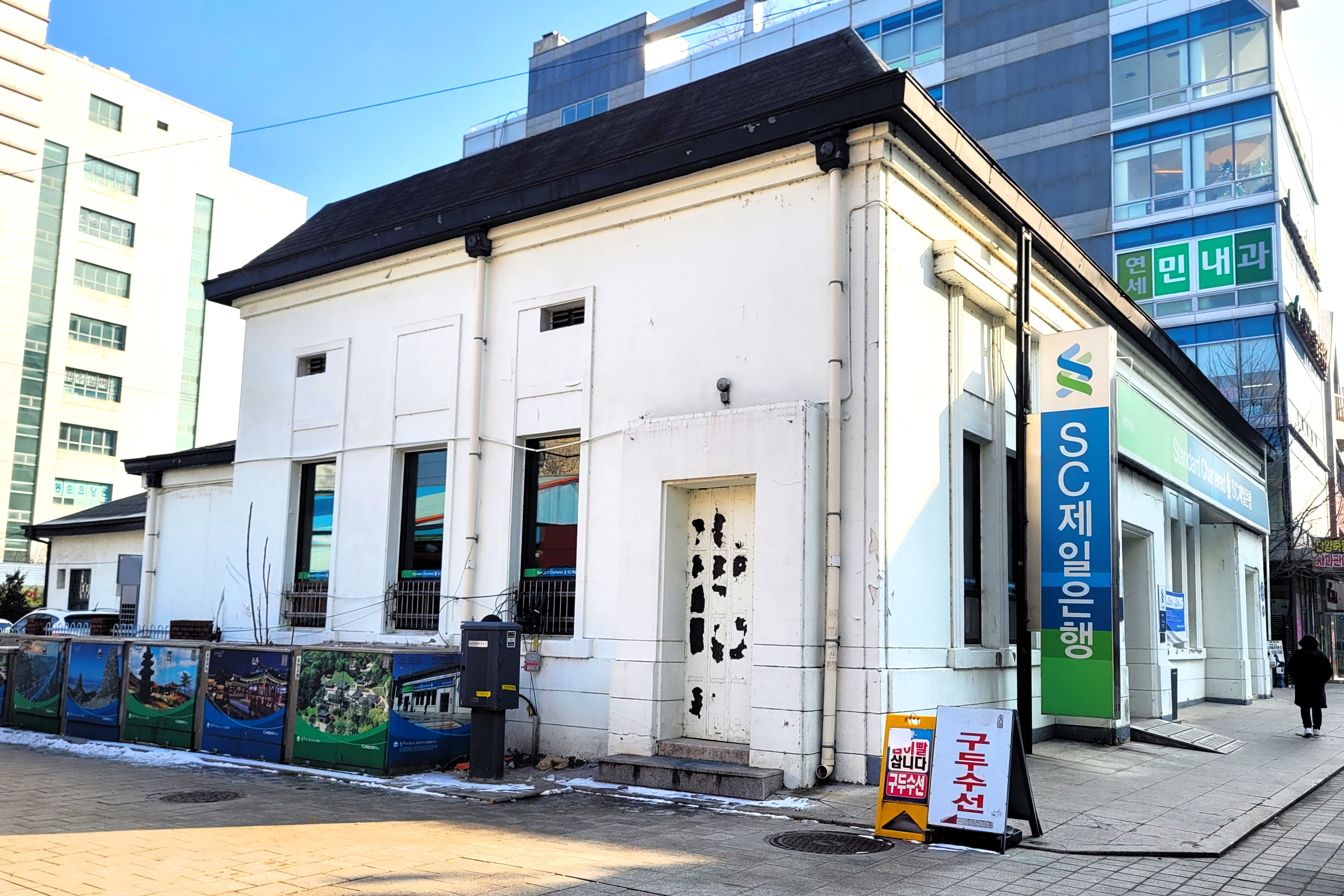
Former branch in Wonju

== See also ==
- Daehan Cheon-il Bank
- Bank of Chōsen
