= KBANK =

KBANK, K-Bank or K Bank may refer to:

- Christiania Bank, a Norwegian bank, also branded as Kreditkassen or K-Bank
- Kasikornbank, a Thai bank (Stock symbol: KBANK)
- K Bank, an internet bank in South Korea which is operated by KT Corporation

== See also ==
- Jammu & Kashmir Bank, an Indian bank (Stock symbol: J&KBANK)
- K-Rep Bank, a commercial bank in Kenya
- K-CASH, an electronic money system in South Korea
