= Yulsan Group =

Former South Korean conglomerate

- Type: Chaebol
- Industry: Construction; Hotels; Electronics
- Founded: June 17, 1975; 51 years ago
- Defunct: 1979
- Fate: Dissolved
- Headquarters: Seoul, South Korea
- Divisions: List of divisions: Yulsan Industries; Yulsan Construction; Yulsan Aluminium; Yulsan Electronics; Yulsan Maritime; Yulsan Heavy Industries; Yulsan Engineering; Yulsan Shoes; Kwangsong Leathers; Kyonghung Products; Seoul Combined Terminal; Hotel Naejang-san; Tonga Industries; Yusin Tourist

Yulsan Group was a South Korean chaebol active from 1975 to 1979 and notable for the scandal surrounding its demise.

== History ==
=== Foundation ===
Yulsan Group was founded on 17 June 1975 by Shin Sun-Ho as an exporter of construction materials. Its first primary business was the export of building materials to the Middle East. It also acquired Shinjin Aluminium on 30 December 1975. As an exporter, it was provided with preferential loan rates of 6-10% compared to 17-23% for general loans.

=== Collapse ===
In 1978, Yulsan was convicted of violating Saudi Arabian law regarding the prohibition of wholesale or retail activities by foreigners, with the resulting fine causing severe damage to Yulsan's financial position. In addition, the South Korean government enacted a ban on cement exports as an inflation reduction measure. Furthermore, Yulsan's construction business struggled to sell its apartments due to the 8 August speculation control measures.

==== Kidnapping incident ====
On January 25 1979, Shin was kidnapped by assailants claiming to be government officials. He escaped 55 minutes later at the Yanjae toll gate on the Gyeongbu Expressway.

==== Arrests ====
Shin Sun-Ho was arrested on 4 April 1979 on charges of embezzlement and violations of the Foreign Exchange Control Act. Shin was accused of faking documents in order to secure bank loans totalling ₩152.3 billion. Furthermore, he was believed to have been assisted by influential members of the government. Alongside Shin's arrest, on 13 April the presidents of three banks that had provided loans to Yulsan (Seoul Trust Bank, Hanil Bank, and Korea First Bank) were also arrested on charges of graft.

==== Dissolution and sale ====
The group was eventually liquidated. Yulsan Heavy Industries and Yulsan Aluminium were acquired by the Hyosung Group in September 1979.

==== Fallout ====
The collapse of Yulsan resulted in a general reduction of confidence in Korean businesses' creditworthiness worldwide.

== Operations ==
The Yulsan Group largely operated in the fields of construction, hotels, and electronics. It consisted of fourteen affiliated companies.

The group was heavily reliant on debt for funding its operations, as in 1977 it had a 26-to-1 debt to equity ratio.

=== Yulsan Aluminium ===
Shinjin Aluminium was acquired from the Shinjin Group in December 1975, and renamed Yulsan Aluminium. It was based in Gwangju, and was a major exporter in the region.

=== Yulsan Industries ===
Yulsan Industries was the trading arm of Yulsan, and was designated a general trading company by the South Korean government in 1978.

=== Kyonghung Products ===
Kyonghung Products was acquired in July 1977, and produced clothing under the Bambim (밤빔) name. It sold clothing both for domestic customers and for export.

=== Yulsan Construction ===
==== Yulsan Vocational Training Centre ====
Yulsan Construction operated a training centre in Janghowon-eup, Icheon for the purpose of training students in skills such as plumbing and electrical work.
