= Korea First Bank =

Former bank in Korea

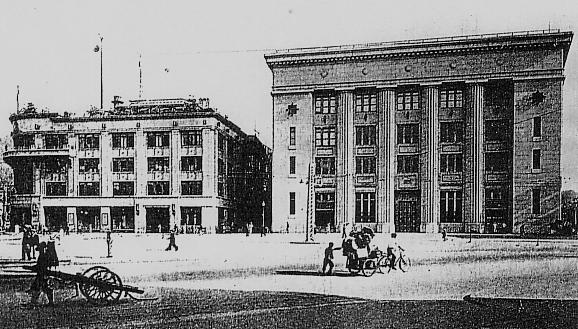
- The head office building of the Chōsen Savings Bank (right), photographed in the late 1930s or early 1940s
- Native name: 제일은행
- Type: Joint stock company
- Industry: Financial services
- Predecessor: Chōsen Savings Bank
- Founded: July 1, 1929 in Keijō (now Seoul)
- Defunct: 1997
- Fate: Bank run and collapse
- Successor: Standard Chartered Bank
- Headquarters: Seoul, Provisional Government of the Republic of Korea
- Area served: Korea
- Products: Banking services

Korea First Bank (Korean: 제일은행; Hanja: 第一銀行), sometimes also referred to as Jeil Bank, was a Korean bank that operated between 1929 and 1997.

It was one of five most prominent banks in South Korea by the mid-1990s, together with Chohung Bank, Korea Commercial Bank, Hanil Bank, and Seoul Bank. It was initially established in Korea under Japanese rule in 1929 as the Chōsen Savings Bank (Korean: 조선저축은행), Following the division of Korea, it changed its name in May 1950 to Korea Savings Bank (Korean: 한국저축은행), and in December 1958 to Korea First Bank.

In December 1997, Korea First Bank was determined as insolvent following a bank run. It was subsequently recapitalized by the Korean authorities, and eventually acquired by Standard Chartered in 2005 to become Standard Chartered Korea.

== Under Japanese rule ==
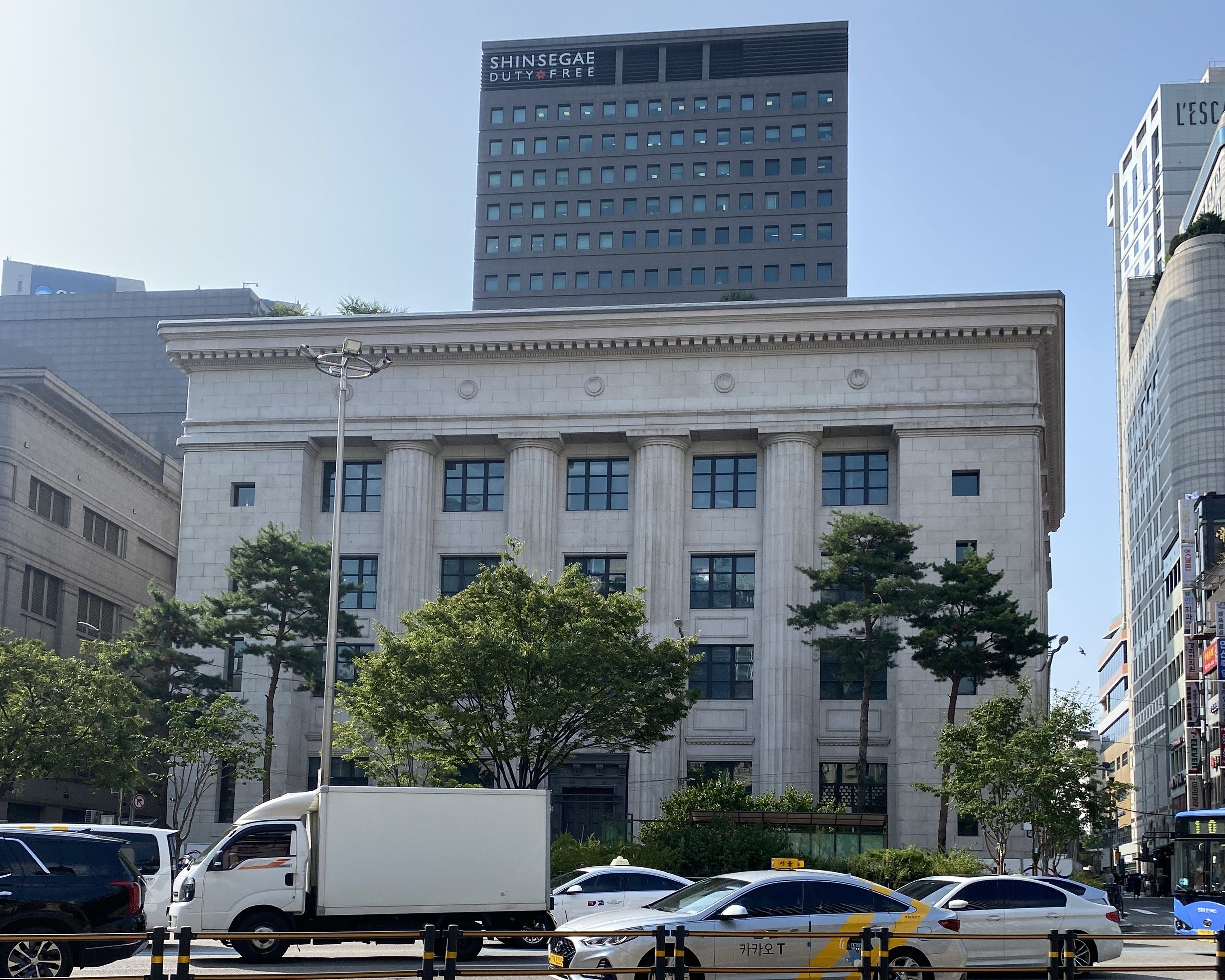
Former head office building, in 2024

Chōsen Savings Bank was founded on 1 July 1929 in Keijō (now Seoul), and opened its first local branch in Busan in October 1930. On 9 December 1935, it moved into a new head office building facing the Bank of Chōsen, which is still extant.

== In South Korea ==
With the division of Korea, as with other banks previously controlled by Japanese interests, the respective operations of Chōsen Savings Bank were taken over by public authorities on both sides of the 38th parallel. In North Korea, they were soon merged into the central bank within the country's monobank system.

In South Korea, they expanded into a fully-fledged commercial banking operation in October 1945. On 25 January 1954, Korea Savings Bank took over some branches of the Korea Industrial Bank, whose central operations formed the basis for the simultaneous establishment of Korea Development Bank. Like other Korean commercial banks, however, it was nationalized in the early 1960s following the May 16 coup, as the military government expropriated large shareholders on the premise that their wealth had been amassed illicitly.

Korea First Bank opened a branch in London on 5 October 1978, an affiliate entity in Hong Kong on 23 May 1980, and a Chinese joint venture in Qingdao on 26 June 1996. Meanwhile, it was privatized in 1982, as part of the limited financial liberalization effort undertaken by then-president Chun Doo-hwan. On 5 October 1987, it relocated to a newly constructed head office building in Jongno-gu, Gongpyeong-dong 100.

== 1997 collapse and aftermath ==
Starting in early 1997, large companies that had borrowed from Korea First Bank started to come under severe financial stress, triggering a deterioration of the bank's financial position that morphed in early December 1997 into a bank run. The Korean authorities executed an emergency recapitalization based on emergency legislation, completed in January 1998, which resulted in the Ministry of Finance owning 46.9 percent of the bank's equity capital, the Korea Deposit Insurance Corporation (KDIC) owning another 46.9 percent, and the former shareholders left with a residual 6.2 percent.

The government intended to sell the bank to a foreign investor by November 1998, but due to lack of acquirers it had to delay the sale and recapitalize the bank again through the KDIC in July 1999, wiping out the former shareholders entirely in the process. This allowed the eventual sale in December 1999 of a 51 percent equity stake to a consortium led by private equity fund Newbridge Capital, which won a competitive bid against HSBC. On 15 April 2005, Standard Chartered won another competitive bidding process, again against HSBC, to acquire control of Korea First Bank, which it renamed SC First Bank on 12 September 2005, then Standard Chartered Bank Korea on 11 January 2012, until reverting to SC First Bank on 6 April 2016.

== See also ==
- List of banks in South Korea
