= Kim Byung-soo =

South Korean footballer and manager

Kim Byung-soo 김병수
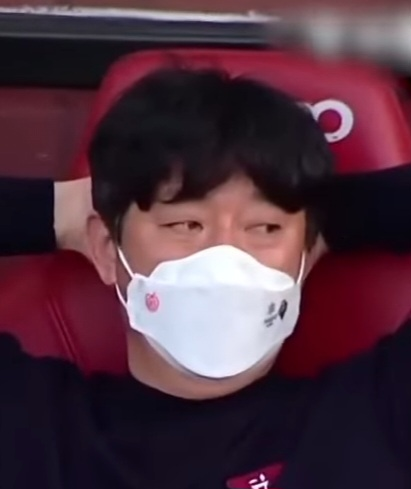
- Kim Byung-soo

Personal information
- Full name: Kim Byung-soo
- Date of birth: November 24, 1970 (age 55)
- Place of birth: Hongcheon, South Korea
- Position: Midfielder

Team information
- Current team: Daegu FC (head coach)

Youth career
- 1988–1991: Korea University

Senior career*
| Years | Team | Apps | (Gls) |
| 1992 | Korea First Bank FC | | |
| 1993–1996 | Cosmo Oil Yokkaichi FC | | |
| 1997 | Oita Trinita | | |

International career
| 1987 | South Korea U17 | | |
| 1991–1992 | South Korea U23 | | |
| 1989 | South Korea | | |
| 1992 | South Korea B | | |

Managerial career
- 2008–2016: Yeungnam University
- 2017: Seoul E-Land
- 2018–2021: Gangwon FC
- 2023: Suwon Samsung Bluewings
- 2025–: Daegu FC
- * Club domestic league appearances and goals

Kim Byung-soo (born November 24, 1970) is a South Korean football manager and player. He is the head coach of K League 1 club Daegu FC.

== Early life ==
Kim was born on November 24, 1970, in Hongcheon County, Gangwon Province. He said that he first became interested in football at Hongcheon Elementary School, where he began imitating members of the school's football team as they practiced juggling a ball. He subsequently attended Midong Elementary School in Seoul, followed by Kyungshin Middle School and Kyungshin High School. Football coach Han Hong-ki noticed Kim while he was young and arranged for him to spend time at the Pohang Steelworks team accommodations, where he trained alongside senior players including Park Chang-sun and Choi Soon-ho. Han also had him study Portuguese in preparation for a possible career abroad.

At Kyungshin High School, Kim became a South Korean youth international. He was selected for the South Korea squad at the 1987 FIFA U-16 World Championship, where the team reached the quarter-finals, but he did not appear in the tournament. In the KBS Cup later that year, he headed the winning goal against Paichai High School in the round of 16, scored both of Kyungshin's goals in its semifinal victory over Sudo Technical High School, and supplied the short free-kick pass that led to the only goal of the final against Daesin High School. Kyungshin won the competition for the first time, and Kim was named its most valuable player.

Kim later recalled that a recurring ankle injury began during his first year at Kyungshin High School. He described rehabilitation practices at the time as rudimentary, often consisting of applying a compression bandage or waiting for the injury to subside. Kim also acknowledged that his own pride and determination to play complete matches, rather than accept reduced playing time, contributed to the injury's recurrence.

Kim entered Korea University in 1988. In June of that year, he scored the opening goal as South Korea defeated Burma 4–0 in an Asian youth championship qualifier, and he was subsequently included in the final squad for the 1988 AFC Youth Championship. His availability at university was nevertheless repeatedly interrupted by injury. Kim recalled returning after lengthy periods away and only brief preparation to play in the annual match against Yonsei University, largely because he strongly wanted to take part. In 1990, he scored the decisive goal in Korea University's 3–2 comeback victory over Yonsei.

Korean coverage later described Kim as an "unlucky genius", a label that he said in 2007 he disliked, arguing that his subsequent work was more important than what had happened during his playing career.

== Club career ==
=== Korea First Bank ===
Ahead of his graduation his graduation from Korea University, Kim and three other Olympic-team players declined to apply for the professional draft for the 1992 season. Contemporary reporting attributed their decision to opposition to the Korea Football Association's fixed scale of signing bonuses, for which the players sought free negotiation. Kim instead joined the semi-professional works team of Korea First Bank in 1992.

In a 2007 interview, Kim added that his chronic injuries had left him unsure that he could withstand the demands of the K League, while professional clubs were themselves uncertain about his fitness. He recalled that Korea First Bank employed him on a temporary contract paying ₩800,000 per month, but that he spent almost the entire year injured and played only the final 30 minutes of the club's last match.

=== Cosmo Oil ===
A Japanese coach had noticed Kim during a Korea University training trip to Japan. While Kim was with Korea First Bank, the coach invited him to Japan with an offer to arrange further surgery and assist his rehabilitation. In 1993, Kim joined Cosmo Oil, then a company team in Division 2 of the Japan Football League. Kim said Cosmo's team training was less intense than the training he had experienced in South Korea and that the staff allowed him to regulate his workload, enabling him to prepare for matches without aggravating his injuries.

Although primarily a playmaker in South Korea, Kim was converted into a striker at Cosmo because the team's limitations made it difficult for him to operate in his customary role. He later said that he enjoyed playing as a forward and that, after approximately two years, the club showed its trust in him by appointing him captain. He regarded the period around age 26 as the peak of his playing career, saying that consistent training had enabled him to visualize how play would develop whenever he received the ball.

Kim scored 35 league goals during his four seasons with Cosmo. He also scored the only goal in Cosmo's 1–0 victory over Bellmare Hiratsuka in the 1993 Emperor's Cup. In 1996, when the club added Yokkaichi to its name while pursuing admission to the J.League, Kim scored the winning goals in cup victories over Tenri University and defending champions Nagoya Grampus Eight. Cosmo defeated Nagoya 1–0 before losing to Bellmare Hiratsuka in the fourth round. The club's bid to enter the J.League did not materialize, and it was disbanded after the 1996 season; Kim attributed the collapse to problems involving its principal sponsor.

=== Oita Trinity and retirement ===
Following Cosmo's dissolution, Kim joined Oita Trinity for the 1997 Japan Football League season. The club did not adopt the name Oita Trinita until it entered the J.League in 1999. Kim scored once for Oita, in a 2–1 victory over NTT Kanto on July 13.

Kim retired after the 1997 season and began coaching the following year. He later said that K League clubs had approached him after his return to South Korea, but that he declined because he no longer believed his body could withstand their training demands.

== International career ==
=== Youth teams ===
Kim was named to South Korea's squad for the 1987 FIFA U-16 World Championship in Canada. South Korea reached the quarter-finals, but Kim did not appear in the tournament.

In 1988, Kim represented the South Korea U-19 team. He scored the opening goal in a 4–0 win over Burma on June 14 during qualification for the 1988 AFC Youth Championship. He was subsequently named to the 20-player squad for the final tournament in Doha, where South Korea defeated Japan, lost to Iraq and drew with the United Arab Emirates before being eliminated in the group stage.

=== Senior representative side ===
Kim received his first call-up to South Korea's senior representative side during the 1989 President's Cup. On June 21, he started as an attacking midfielder in a 3–0 win over Hungary's under-21 team. His corner was headed on by Choi Soon-ho for Hwang Sun-hong to score the opening goal. The match is not classified as a full international, and the Korea Football Association's A-match database credits Kim with no senior caps or goals.

The following month, Kim was included in a 25-player squad preparing for the final Asian round of qualification for the 1990 FIFA World Cup. He did not make the 22-player squad confirmed in August for the final qualifying tournament.

=== Olympic team ===
Kim did not play in the first round of qualification for the 1992 Summer Olympics while injured. At the conclusion of that round, manager Kim Sam-rak identified him as one of several injured regulars whom he intended to recall after their recovery. Kim returned for the six-team final round in Kuala Lumpur in January 1992. Wearing the number 10 shirt, he started all five matches.

Kim assisted Noh Jung-yoon's winning goal in a 1–0 victory over Bahrain on January 21. Six days later, he scored the only goal against Japan with an 88th-minute volley. The victory left South Korea needing at least a draw against China in its final match; a 3–1 win three days later secured qualification for the Olympic tournament.

Kim later said that he had returned after approximately two years out through injury and only three months of training. His knee broke down after the qualifying tournament, requiring another operation. He was one of seven players left out of South Korea's final 20-player Olympic squad announced in April.

== Coaching career ==
On 9 January 2017, he was appointed manager of Seoul E-Land FC.
