= BWS =

BWS may refer to:

== Arts and entertainment ==
- The Black Wall Street Records, a record label started by rapper Game
- Burnt Weeny Sandwich, a 1970 record by Frank Zappa & The Mothers of Invention

== Education ==
- Bishop Wordsworth's School, a school in Salisbury, UK
- Bishop Walsh Primary School, a primary school, HK

== Health ==
- Battered woman syndrome
- Beckwith-Wiedemann syndrome, a rare congenital disease
- Benzodiazepine withdrawal syndrome

== Other uses ==
- BWS (liquor retailer), Australian liquor retailer, owned by Endeavour Group
- Banco Wiese Sudameris, a bank in Peru
- Bank Woori Saudara, a bank in Indonesia
- Barry Windsor-Smith, a British cartoonist, comics-author, and painter
- Brainwave synchronization
- Bombardier Wien Schienenfahrzeuge, (Bombardier Vienna rail vehicles)
