= Standard Chartered Korea =

South Korean financial services company

Standard Chartered Bank Korea Limited
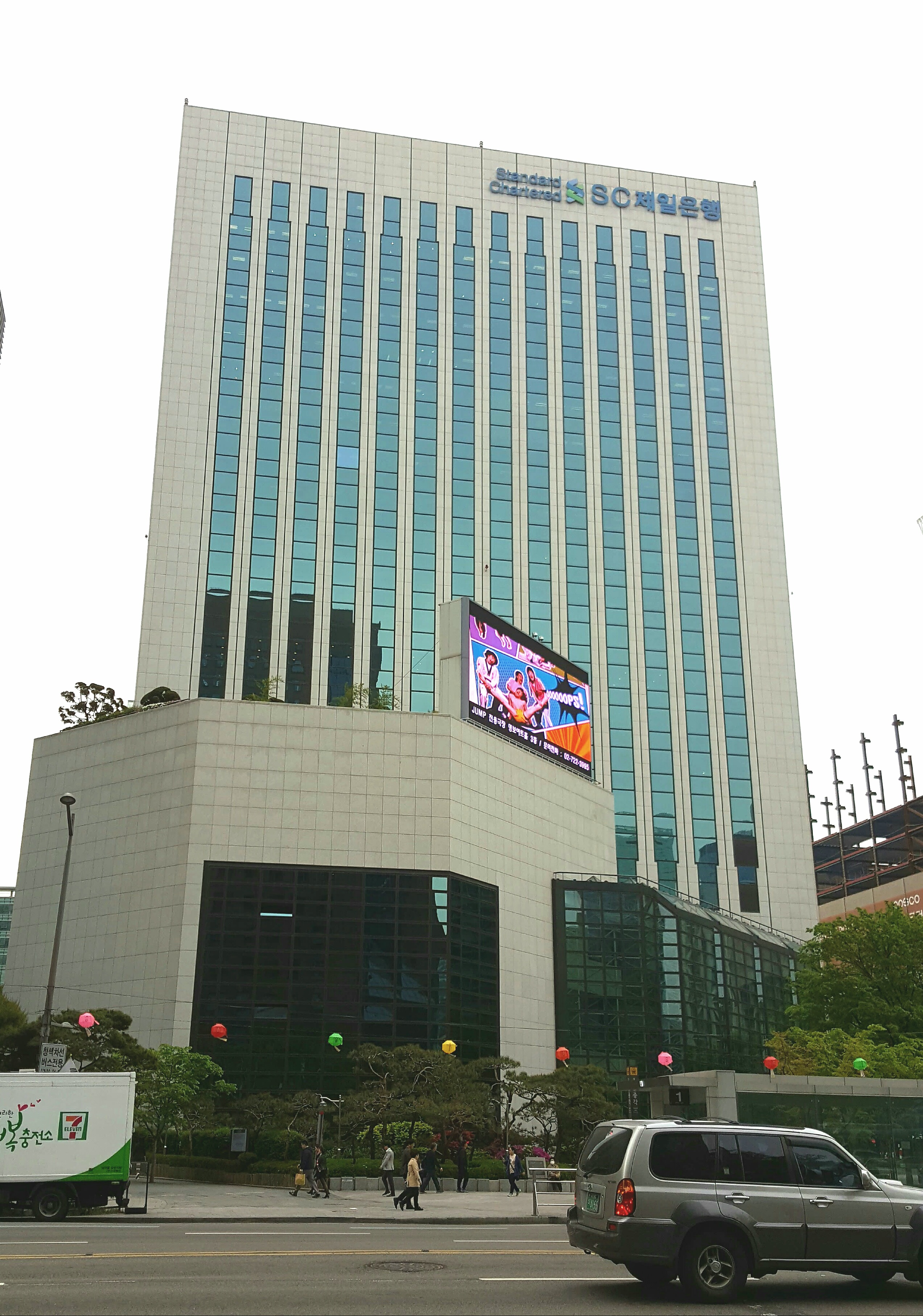
- Romanized name: SCJeil Unheng
- Type: Public
- Industry: Financial
- Founded: 1929; 97 years ago
- Headquarters: Seoul, South Korea
- Key people: Park Jong-Bok (CEO)
- Products: Financial services
- Parent: Standard Chartered
- Website: www.standardchartered.co.kr

Standard Chartered Korea (officially Standard Chartered Bank Korea Limited, formerly SC First Bank, Hangul: SC제일은행) is a banking and financial services company headquartered in Seoul, South Korea and a wholly owned subsidiary of Standard Chartered. It was created by the acquisition of the former Korea First Bank by Standard Chartered in 2005.

== History ==
By the 1990s, Korea First Bank had become one of the five largest commercial banks in South Korea, together with Chohung Bank, Korea Commercial Bank, Hanil Bank, and Seoul Bank. It fell into financial trouble during the 1997 Asian financial crisis. It was acquired by Standard Chartered in 2005.

== See also ==
- Economy of South Korea
- List of Banks in South Korea
- Standard Chartered
