= Hana Bank =

South Korean commercial bank

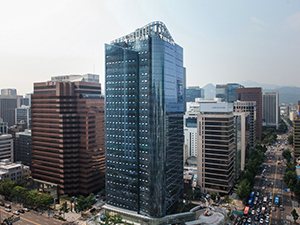
- Native name: 주식회사 하나은행
- Company type: Subsidiary
- Industry: Banking
- Founded: 1959 (Seoul Bank); 1967 (KEB); 1971 (Hana Bank)
- Headquarters: Seoul, South Korea
- Area served: Worldwide
- Key people: Park Sung-ho (president & CEO)
- Parent: Hana Financial Group
- Website: kebhana.com

- Hana Bank
- Hangul: 하나은행
- Hanja: 하나銀行
- RR: Hana eunhaeng
- MR: Hana ŭnhaeng

Hana Bank (Korean: 하나은행), known from its initial establishment in 1971 to 1991 as Korea Investment Finance Corporation (Korean: 한국투자금융), is one of South Korea's largest banks. It merged with Seoul Bank (est. 1959) in 2002, then with Korea Exchange Bank (est. 1967) in 2015, and was branded KEB Hana Bank from 2015 to 2019. It is a subsidiary of Hana Financial Group.

Hana Bank is the largest and longest-running exchange bank in South Korea, with 40% of South Korea's foreign exchange market. Its exchange services include currency exchange and wire transfers.

== History ==
The Korea Investment Finance Corporation was established in 1971, and changed its name to Hana Bank as it started banking operations in 1991. In 1998, it acquired Chungcheong Bank, which it rebranded as Chungcheong Hana Bank (later Hana Bank Chungcheong Business Group). In 1999, it merged with Boram Bank.

In August 2002, it was announced that Seoul Bank, one of Korea's largest banks which had been determined as insolvent and taken into government ownership in December 1997, would be merged with Hana Bank, as the latter had been selected in a competitive bidding process against Lone Star Funds. The merger was completed in December 2002. As a result, Hana became the third-largest bank in South Korea, behind Kookmin Bank and Woori Bank.

Following years of efforts, Hana Financial Group merged Hana Bank and Korea Exchange Bank (KEB) and launched KEB Hana Bank in September 2015.

In February 2019, the bank's name was changed back from KEB Hana Bank to Hana Bank.

In January 2021, Hana Bank secured approval from Taiwan's financial authorities to open a branch in Taiwan, making it the first bank from South Korea to set up a foothold on the island.

== See also ==
- Hana Bank Invitational
- LPGA KEB Hana Bank Championship
- List of Banks in South Korea
- List of South Korean companies
- Economy of South Korea
- Lone Star Funds
