= Chohung Bank =

South Korean bank company

Chohung Bank Co., Ltd.
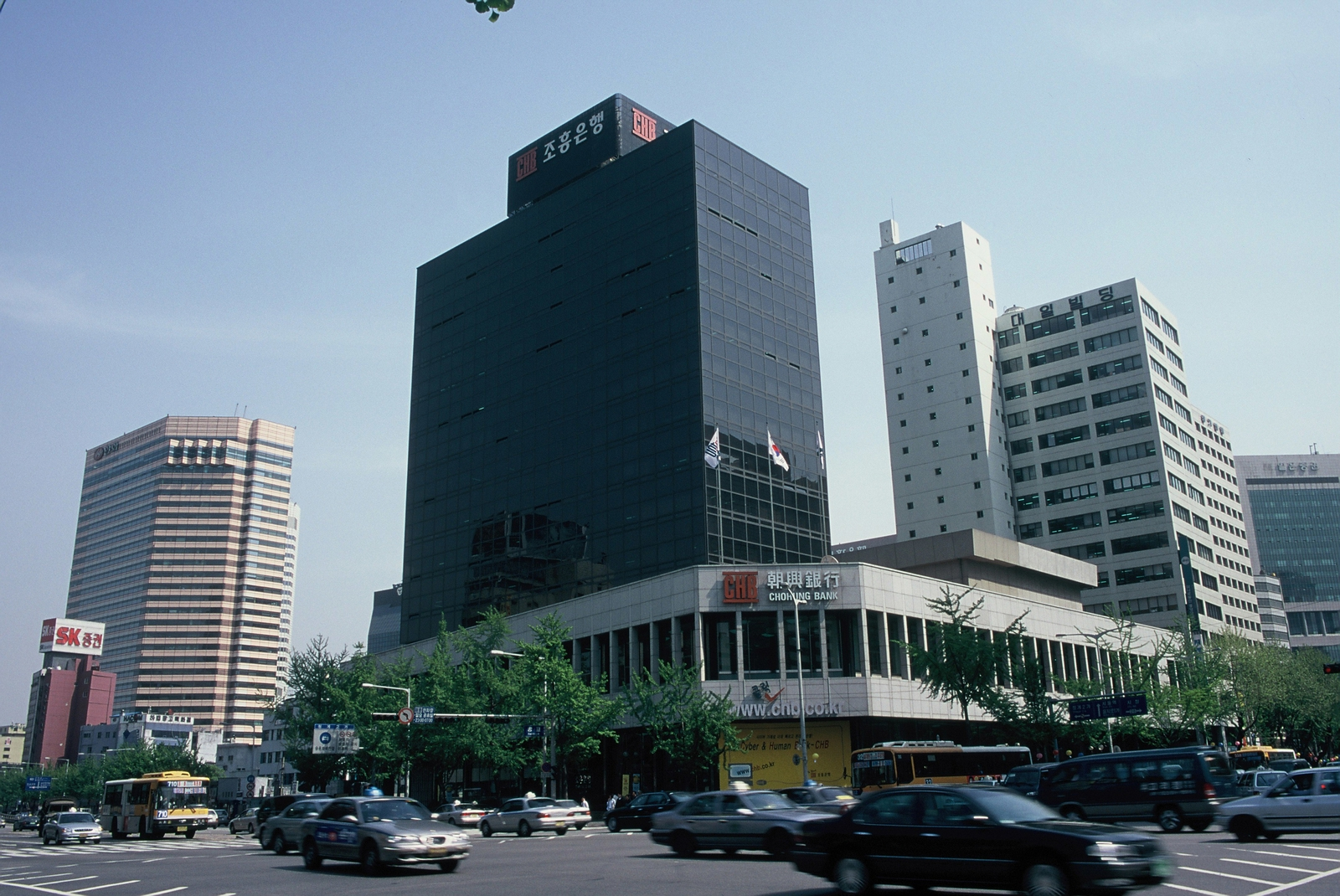
- Chohung Bank headquarters in 2000
- Native name: 주식회사 조흥은행
- Industry: Banking
- Founded: October 1, 1943; 83 years ago
- Defunct: April 1, 2006; 20 years ago
- Fate: Merged with Shinhan Bank
- Successor: Shinhan Bank
- Headquarters: Seoul, South Korea
- Products: Financial services

Korean name
- Hangul: 조흥은행
- Hanja: 朝興銀行
- RR: Joheung eunhaeng
- MR: Chohŭng ŭnhaeng

Chohung Bank Co., Ltd. (CHB; Korean: 조흥은행; Hanja: 朝興銀行, sometimes transcribed as Joheung Bank) was a bank company headquartered in Seoul, South Korea. It was formed by the 1943 merger of Hanseong Bank (Korean: 한성은행; Hanja: 漢城銀), established in 1897 and sometimes referred to as Korea's first bank, and Dong-il Bank (Korean: 동일은행), originally established in 1906 as Hanil Bank (Korean: 한일은행, not to be confused with the namesake South Korean Bank active between 1960 and 1999) and renamed in 1931.

By the mid-1990s, Chohung Bank was one of the five most prominent banks in South Korea, together with Korea First Bank, Korea Commercial Bank, Hanil Bank, and Seoul Bank. It was negatively affected by the 1997 Asian financial crisis and eventually merged into Shinhan Financial Group in 2003–2006.

== Korean Empire and Japanese rule ==
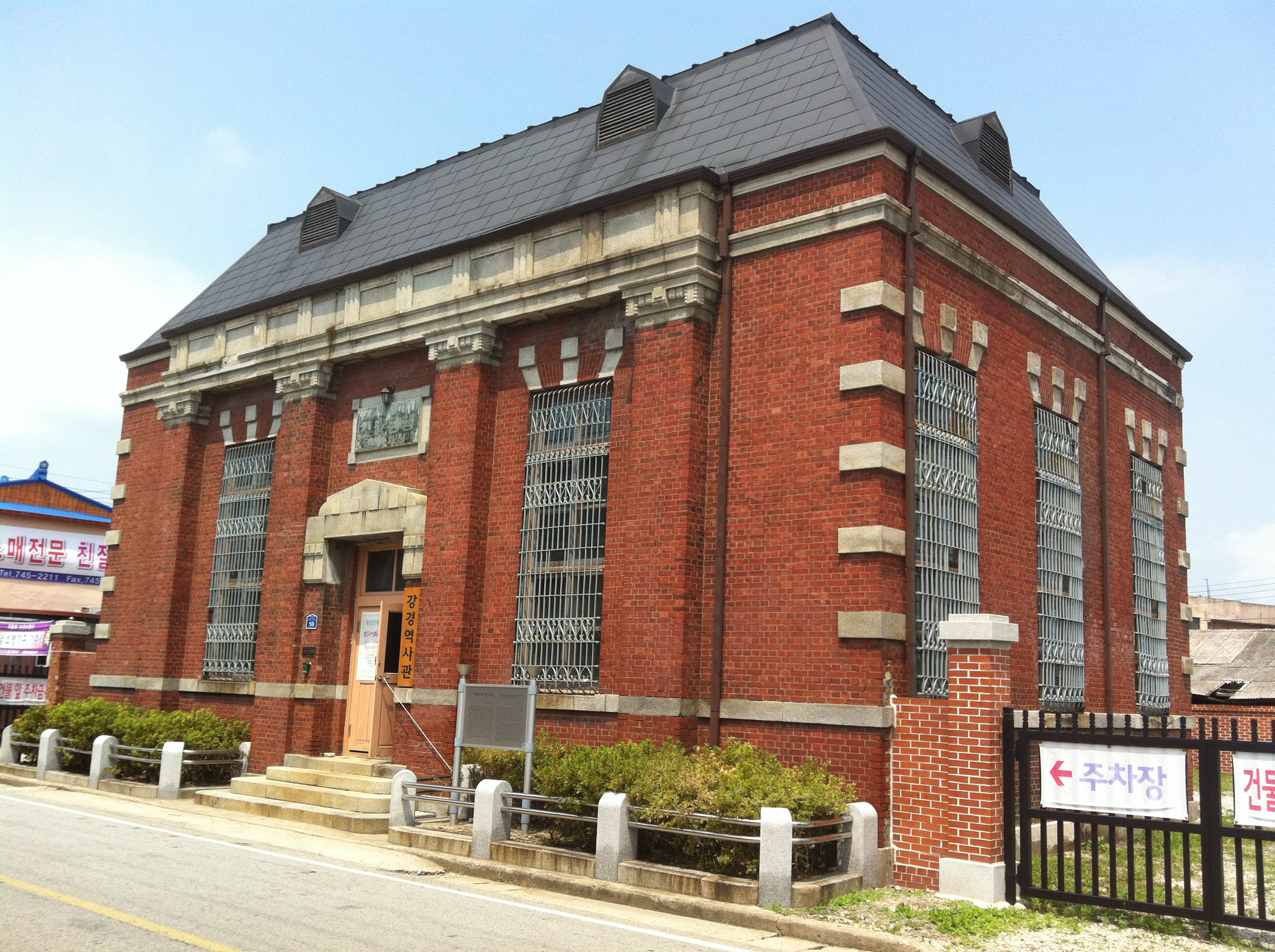
Former branch building of Hanil Bank in Ganggyeong, erected in 1913 and used by Chohung Bank until 1954

Hanseong Bank was established on 19 February 1897. The bank was successful because despite lending out money at twice the rate it borrowed it at, the bank's interest rates were still far lower than what could be obtained elsewhere in Korea at that time. In an anecdotal story the bank's first property to use as collateral on a loan happened to be a donkey. The bank staff were challenged to feed and care for their collateral as the loan was out.

Hanil Bank was created in 1906 by a group of Korean landowners. Its name is a shorthand for “Korean-Japanese Bank”. It went through several restructurings during the Japanese colonial period. It absorbed Hoseo Bank and renamed itself Dong-il Bank (sometimes transcribed as Tongil Bank) in January 1931, but subsequently experienced financial difficulties that led to its takeover by Japanese interests.

Hanseong Bank and Dong-il Bank merged on 1 October 1943 to form Chohung Bank.

== In South Korea ==
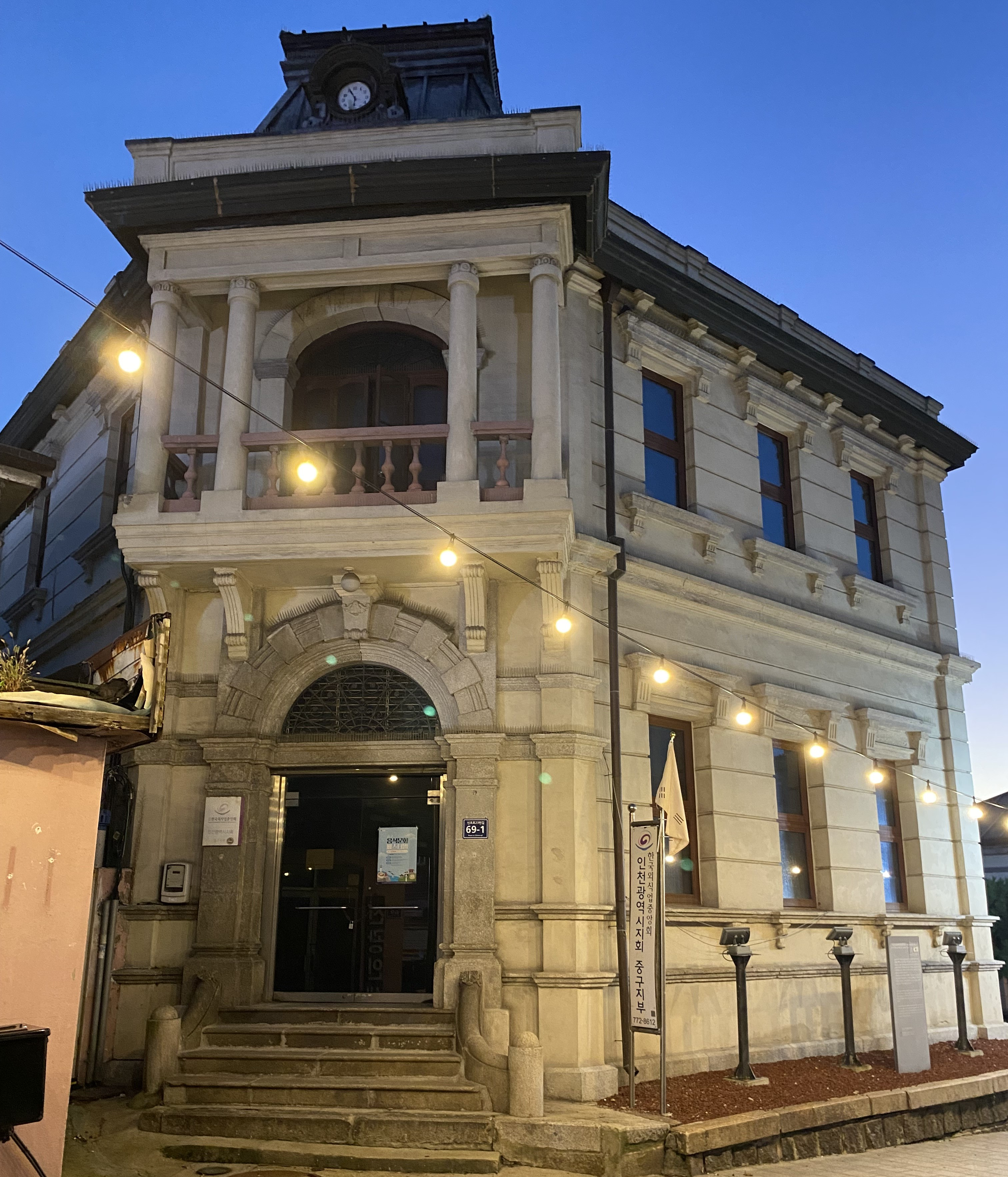
in 1945 Chohung Bank took over Korean assets of Yasuda Bank, including this branch originally built in Incheon in 1892 for Japan's 58th National Bank

With the division of Korea, as with other banks previously controlled by Japanese interests, the respective operations of Chohung Bank were taken over by public authorities on both sides of the 38th parallel. In North Korea, they were soon merged into the central bank within the country's monobank system.

In South Korea, Chohung Bank initially lobbied on nationalist grounds to become the newly independent country's central bank, but was superseded by the more experienced Bank of Joseon. It was privatized under the government of Syngman Rhee in the 1950s, then nationalized again in 1961 by new military government following the May 16 coup, as the military government expropriated large shareholders on the premise that their wealth had been amassed illicitly. Its headquarters at 14 Namdaemunro in Seoul was destroyed by fire, and eventually replaced with a new building in December 1966. It was again privatized in 1983, as part of the limited financial liberalization effort undertaken by then-president Chun Doo-hwan.

Chohung Bank fell under financial trouble during the 1997 Asian financial crisis. In December 1998, it announced its merger with two other financial institutions, Kangwon Bank (est. 1970) and Hyundai Merchant Bank, with simultaneous public recapitalization which resulted in the Korean government owning 90 percent of the merged entity's equity capital. By late 2002, the government still held 80 percent of Chohung Bank's equity.

Shinhan Bank acquired a majority stake in 2003, then full ownership in 2004, then merged with it in April 2006, a combination encouraged by the South Korean government to foster economies of scale in the banking sector. Given the prestige associated with Chohung's history, however, the merger's structure preserved the legal entity of Chohung Bank which was renamed Shinhan Bank. As a consequence, Shinhan Bank views itself as the oldest bank in Korea.

== See also ==
- Chohung Bank FC
- Shinhan Financial Group
- List of banks in South Korea
