= K Bank =

South Korean online bank

Kbank
- Native name: 케이뱅크
- Company type: Private company
- Traded as: KRX: 279570
- Industry: Financial services
- Founded: January 17, 2016; 10 years ago
- Headquarters: Seoul, South Korea
- Services: Online banking Mobile banking Loan and deposit Debit card Overseas remittance
- Owner: BC Card; Woori Bank; MBK Partners; Bain Capital
- Number of employees: 7,201 (2017)
- Website: www.kbbanknow.com (Korean)

Kbank (Korean: 케이뱅크) is an online bank based in South Korea. Its largest owner is the telecommunications company, KT Corporation.

== History ==
Kbank launched in 2017, when both KT and Kakao were given licenses to launch Internet-only banks in Korea. These two became the first new banks to launch in two decades. The bank attracted 250,000 customers in its first two weeks.

In May 2021, MBK Partners and Bain Capital invested 200 billion won each in Kbank to become the second largest shareholders of the bank.

In September 2022, Kbank received approval for its initial public offering on the Korea Exchange although timing had not been determined yet.

== Services ==
Kbank offers the same products as traditional banks from debit cards to small loans.

== See also ==
- List of banks in South Korea
