= Gwangtonggwan =

Historic building in Seoul, South Korea

- 광통관; 廣通館
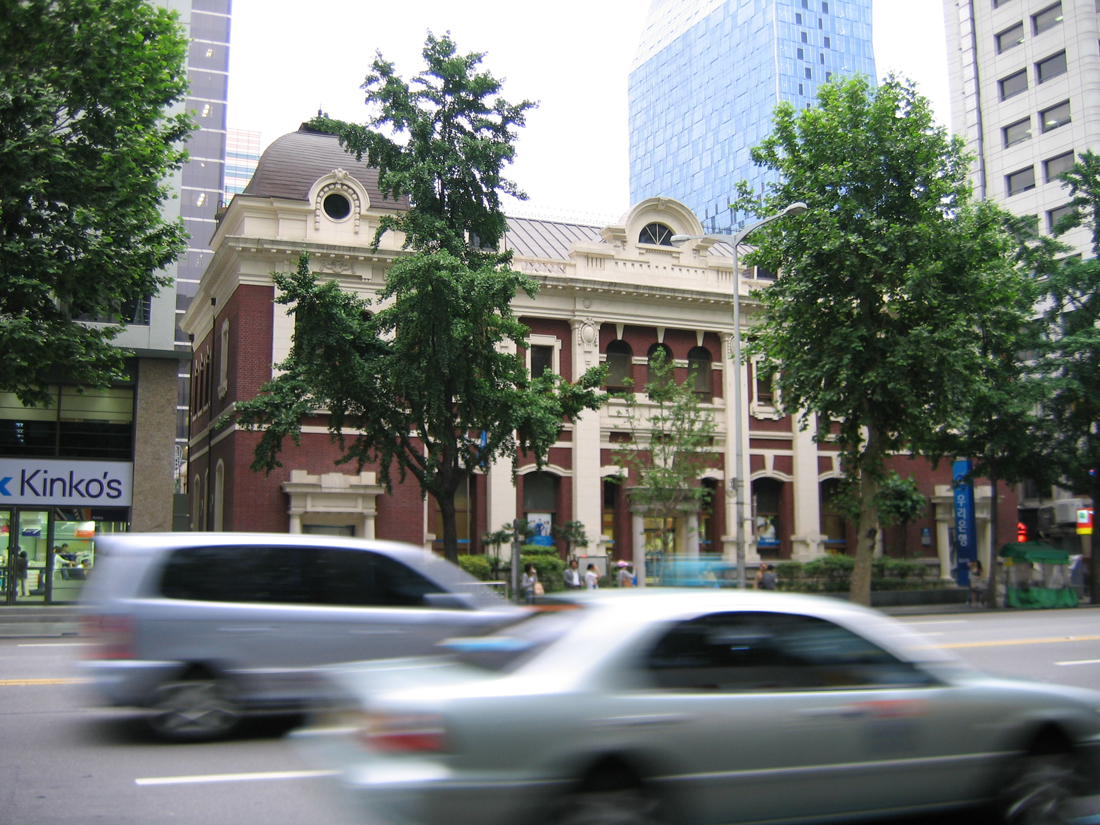
- Interactive map of the Gwangtonggwan area
- Former names: Daehan Cheon-il Bank
- Alternative names: Uri Eunhaeng Jongno-Jijeom (Woori Bank Jongno Branch)

General information
- Architectural style: Eclectic
- Location: Seoul, South Korea, 19 Namdaemunno 1-ga, Jung-gu, Seoul
- Coordinates: 37°34′03″N 126°58′59″E
- Construction started: February 1908
- Completed: 1909
- Renovated: 1915
- Owner: Woori Bank

Technical details
- Floor area: 774 square meters

Design and construction
- Architecture firm: Takjibu, Korean Empire

Gwangtonggwan (Korean: 광통관; Hanja: 廣通館) is a building at 19 Namdaemunno 1-ga, Jung District, Seoul, South Korea. Built in 1909, it is one of Korea's oldest bank buildings. Currently the Woori Bank's Jongno Branch, it is also the oldest continuously operating bank building in Korea.

Constructed in 1909, Gwangtonggwan is one of the few surviving examples of Korea's early 20th century western architecture. In recognition of the building's architectural and historic importance, Gwangtonggwan was registered as the one of city's protected monuments on March 5, 2001.

== History ==
Gwangtonggwan was built in 1909 originally as a head office for Daehan Cheon-il Bank and Suhyeongjohap. Daehan Cheon-il Bank, established in 1899 and supported by the Emperor Gojong of the Korean Empire, was a Korean bank aimed to preserve Korea's national capital assets against the growing influences of the Japanese banks over Korea's finances. The building itself was designed by the architecture and construction office of the Takjibu, the Ministry of Finance of the Korean Empire. The construction of this building was finished in July 1909.

However, a fire occurred in February 1914, and the building's detail was much altered from its original form when it was restored and reopened in 1915. Since this building was located near Gwangtonggyo Bridge, a historic and important bridge of Seoul that crosses Cheonggyecheon, it came to be called as "Gwangtonggwan". The Korean term "gyo" (교; 橋) translates in English as "bridge", while "gwan" (관; 館) translates as "building" or "house".

Following Japan's annexation of Korean Empire in 1910, Cheon-il Bank changed its name to Joseon Sangup Bank in 1911, and moved its head offices from Gwangtonggwan to a different location in 1924. The building therefore became the Sangup Bank's Jongno branch on August 31, 1924.

Joseon Sangup bank changed its name to Hanguk Sangup Bank (also known as Commercial Bank of Korea) when Korea was liberated, changed its name to Hanbit Bank in 1998, and then again to Woori Bank in 2002, but Gwangtonggwan still maintains and continues its banking operations as a Jongno branch.

== Architecture ==
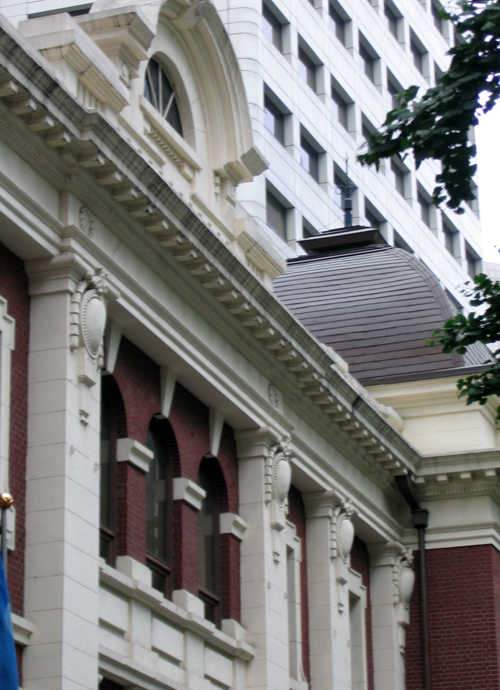
Gwangtonggwan's architectural details

Mainly built from red bricks and granite, the Gwangtonggwan building has a symmetrical layout which roughly covers 774 square meters. The first floor of this building was designed and served as a bank, while the second floor was designed for conference rooms and offices.

When it was originally constructed in 1909, the building had Ionic pilasters, but during the reconstruction following the fire in 1914, the Ionic capitals were removed and baroque decorations were added instead to the pilasters. Today's building has circular and arched windows, decorated pilasters, two baroque-styled domes with finials, two dormer windows, and a detailed pediment consisting of a half-circular window.

Rejecting references to a traditional Korean architecture, the architects designed Gwangtonggwan in an eclectic and westernized style. The main entrance is flanked by two Tuscan columns, and its entablature bears an inscription, "朝鮮商業銀行鐘路支店" (조선상업은행 종로지점; Joseon Sangup Bank Jongno Branch), inscribed from right to left following the old Korean tradition of writing. Two other entrances on either side of the main entrance also are flanked by two Tuscan columns, but are no longer used as entrances.
