= List of banks in South Korea =

This is a list of South Korean banks and the parenthesized number is the bank number.

== Central bank ==
- Bank of Korea (001)

== Specialized banks ==
Specialized banks are financial institutions established under a special act, not the Korean Banking Act. The South Korean government owns the majority of its shares in the Korea Development Bank, Industrial Bank of Korea, and Korea Eximbank. Suhyup Bank and Nonghyup Bank are not owned by the Korean government, but their organizations (NFAC – which is a sole shareholder of Nonghyup Financial Group – and NFFC) are largely influenced by the Korean government.

- Export-Import Bank of Korea (008)
- Industrial Bank of Korea (003)
- Korea Development Bank (002)
- Nonghyup Bank (011)
- Suhyup Bank (007)

== Commercial banks ==
=== Nationwide ===
- Citigroup
  - Citibank Korea (027)
- Hana Financial Group
  - Hana Bank (081)
- KB Financial Group
  - Kookmin Bank (004)
- Standard Chartered
  - Standard Chartered Korea (023) (trading as SC First)
- Shinhan Financial Group
  - Shinhan Bank (088)
- Woori Financial Group
  - Woori Bank (020)
- DGB Financial Group
  - Daegu Bank (031)
- BNK Financial Group
  - Busan Bank (032)
  - Kyongnam Bank (039)

=== Local ===
- JB Financial Group
  - Kwangju Bank (034)
  - Jeonbuk Bank (037)
- Shinhan Financial Group
  - Jeju Bank (035)

=== Internet-only ===
- K Bank (089)
- KakaoBank (090)
- Toss Bank (092)

=== Foreign bank branches ===
As of 2023, 34 foreign bank branches are affiliated with the Federation of Korean Banks as associate members. The GIRO code for unlisted foreign banks is 051.

- Agricultural Bank of China
- ANZ
- Bank Mellat
- Bank Negara Indonesia
- Bank of America (060)
- Bank of China (063)
- Bank of Communications (066)
- BNP Paribas (061)
- BNY Mellon
- China Construction Bank (067)
- China Everbright Bank
- Crédit Agricole Corporate and Investment Bank
- Credit Suisse
- DBS Bank
- Deutsche Bank (055)
- HSBC (054)
- Industrial and Commercial Bank of China (062)
- ING Bank
- JPMorgan Chase (057)
- Landesbank Baden-Württemberg
- Metrobank
- Mizuho Bank (058)
- Morgan Stanley (052)
- MUFG Bank (059)
- National Bank of Pakistan
- OCBC Bank
- Société Générale
- State Bank of India
- State Street Bank and Trust Company
- Sumitomo Mitsui Banking Corporation
- Union of Arab and French Banks
- United Overseas Bank (065)
- Wells Fargo
- Yamaguchi Bank

== Non-bank depository institutions ==
In comparison to commercial banks, non-bank deposit-taking institutions have a narrower scope of business activities. They are established for limited purposes and governed by distinct regulations concerning their fund-raising and management. Payment and settlement services may be limited or non-existent, and their business focuses are constrained in accordance with each institution's unique characteristics.

Strictly, these institutions are not banks, but have a similar purpose and are widely recognised as a kind of bank. These institutions cannot use the name "bank" except (according to the 2010 Mutual Savings Banks Act) the Mutual Savings Bank.

=== Credit cooperatives ===
- Korea Federation of Community Credit Cooperatives (045, 046, 085)
- National Agricultural Cooperative Federation (012)
- National Credit Union Federation of Korea (048)
- National Federation of Fisheries Cooperatives (007)
- National Forestry Cooperative Federation (064)

=== Mutual savings bank (050) ===
- OK Savings Bank
- Pepper Savings Bank
- SBI Savings Bank

=== Postal saving ===
- Korea Post (071), Postal Financial Service by MSIP

== M&A tree ==
- KB Kookmin Bank
  - Kookmin Bank (old, ~2001)
    - Daedong Bank (~1998)
    - Long-term Credit Bank (~1998)
  - Housing and Commercial Bank (~2001)
    - Dongnam Bank (~1998)
- Woori Bank
  - Woori Bank ← Hanvit Bank
    - Korea Commercial Bank
    - Hanil Bank
  - Korea Peace Bank (~2001)
- Shinhan Bank
  - Chohung Bank (~2006)
    - Chungbuk Bank (~1999)
    - Kangwon Bank (~1999)
  - Shinhan Bank (old, ~2006)
    - Dongwha Bank (~1998)
- KEB Hana Bank
  - Korea Exchange Bank (~2012)
  - Seoul Bank (~2002)
  - Boram Bank (~1996)
  - Chungchong Bank (~1998)
- Citibank Korea
  - Citibank N.A. Seoul branch (~2004)
  - KorAm Bank (~2004)
    - Kyungki Bank

== See also ==
- List of banks in Asia
- List of South Korean companies
- Economy of South Korea
