= Na Seok-ju =

Korean independence activist (1892–1926)

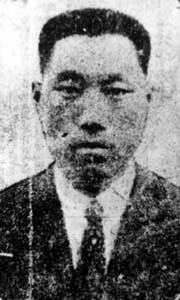
- Na Seok-ju
- Born: February 4, 1892; Chaeryong County, Hwanghae Province, Joseon
- Died: December 28, 1926 (aged 34); Shanghai, China
- Cause of death: Suicide by gunshot
- Known for: Korean independence activist
- Awards: Order of Merit for National Foundation

Korean name
- Hangul: 나석주
- Hanja: 羅錫疇
- RR: Na Seokju
- MR: Na Sŏkchu

Na Seok-ju (February 4, 1892 – December 28, 1926) was a Korean independence activist. He lived during the Japanese colonization of Korea, and joined the Korean Provisional Government in their resistance against the Empire of Japan.

He is most remembered for his attack on the Oriental Development Company, an organization set up by Imperial Japan as part of its imperial expansion and the development of its colonies.

== Early life and career ==
Na Seok-ju was born into on February 4, 1892, in Chaeryong County, Hwanghae Province, Joseon. He grew up in a farming family.

As he got older, he moved to Manchuria in order to receive military training for four years. After completing his training, Na Seok-ju returned to his hometown and worked as the manager of a local store. During this period, Na was also involved in underground political movements against the Japanese colonial rule of Korea; during the March 1st Movement (1919) in occupied Korea, he helped to organize local protest efforts and raise funds for Korean nationalist militant groups.

In 1920 Na Seok-ju was found responsible for killing multiple Japanese authorities, as well as a Korean man believed to be a conspirator with the Japanese, resulting in Na's decision to flee to Shanghai on September 22, 1920, to escape the charges. While in China Na served as a bodyguard for the Provisional Government of Korea, which had been formed in reaction to Japanese suppression of Korean protesters and activists after the March 1 Movement. Na also visited Tianjin while in China in order to meet with Kim Chang-suk, who asked him to blow up the Oriental Development Company, Bank of Chōsen, and Chōsen Industrial Bank buildings upon his return to Korea.

== Attack and death ==
On December 26, 1926, Na Seok-ju travelled south from Manchuria towards Seoul. After using various disguises to get across the Chinese-Korean border and through different checkpoints, Na finally arrived in Seoul on December 28. He first went to the Chôsen Industrial Bank, where he detonated a grenade near the loan department, destroying it. From there, he made his way to the Oriental Development Company building, where he shot multiple Japanese office workers within the building; Na then attempted to detonate another grenade in order to kill several higher-level employees, but failed when the grenade proved to be a dud. After leaving the second building, Na attempted to escape the premises, killing a Japanese police officer in the process.

Na was pursued by the Japanese police force. In order to avoid being apprehended, Na Seok-ju shot himself three times in the chest, and died later that day after being rushed to hospital.

== Legacy ==
Na was given posthumous honors, and acknowledged as a nationalist hero, with a statue of him erected in Seoul.
