= Daehan Cheon-il Bank =

Former Korean bank

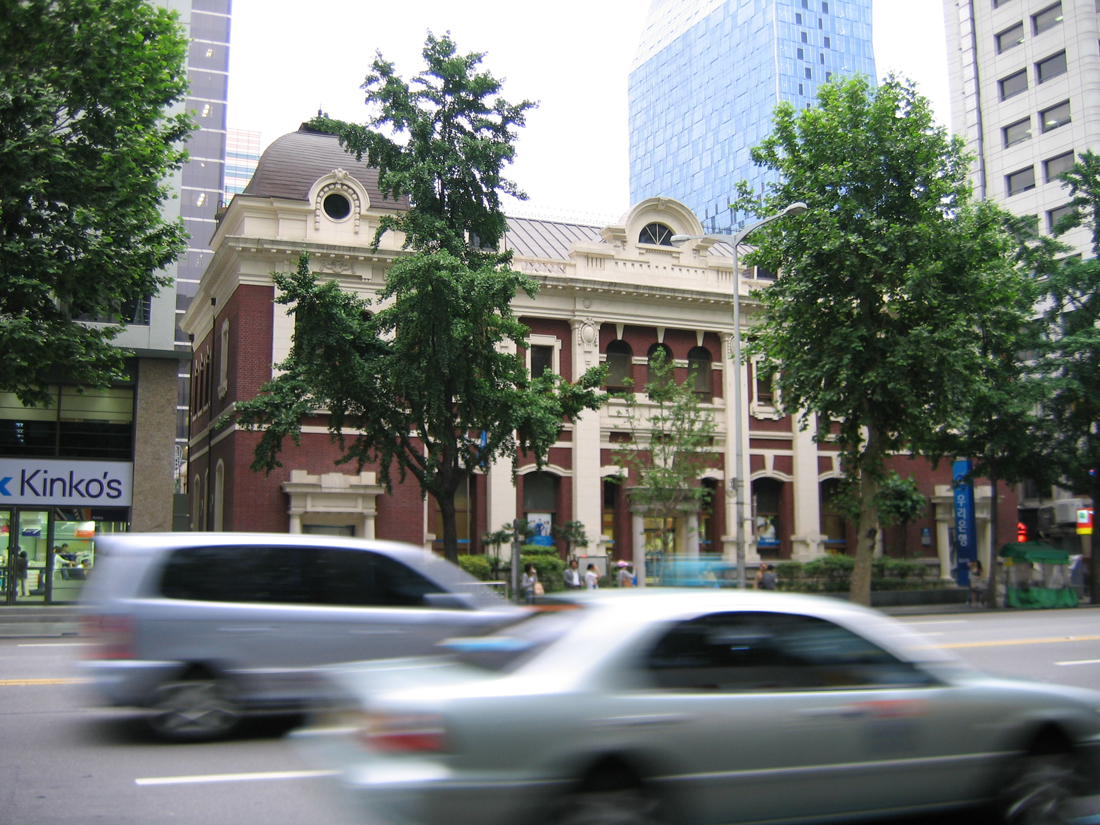
- Gwangtonggwan building in Seoul, head office of Daehan Cheon-il Bank (1909-1911) then of Chōsen Commercial Bank (1911-1924)
- Native name: 대한천일은행
- Type: Joint-stock company
- Industry: Financial services
- Founded: January 30, 1899; 127 years ago in Hanseong (now Seoul, South Korea)
- Defunct: 1997
- Fate: Rescued and merged
- Successor: Woori Bank
- Headquarters: Seoul, South Korea
- Area served: Korea
- Products: Banking services

Daehan Cheon-il Bank (Korean: 대한천일은행), sometimes transcribed as Daehancheonil Bank, was the first viable domestic joint-stock bank in Korea, established in 1899. In its early years it was one of only two Korean-owned Western-style banks, together with the Hanseong Bank (est. 1897). In 1911 it was renamed Chōsen Commercial Bank (조선상업은행, also transcribed as Joseon Sangup Bank), then in 1950 Korea Commercial Bank (한국상업은행).

By the 1990s, Korea Commercial Bank was still one of the five most prominent banks in South Korea, alongside Chohung Bank, Korea First Bank, Hanil Bank, and Seoul Bank. It suffered from the 1997 Asian financial crisis, however, and was eventually merged with Hanil Bank to form Woori Bank.

== Background ==
Modern financial development in Korea started with the Japan–Korea Treaty of 1876 and the subsequent entry into the country of joint-stock Japanese banks, which themselves had only been established in the course of that same decade. Thus, the Dai-Ichi Bank ("First Bank"), Japan's first joint-stock bank created by Shibusawa Eiichi in 1873, opened a branch in Busan in 1878, followed by Chemulpo (nowadays Incheon) in 1883. The Eighteenth Bank, established in Nagasaki in 1877, similarly opened a branch in Chemulpo in 1890.

The dominance of Japanese banks created dismay among Korean reformers. In 1894, the Joseon government created a department to oversee banking activities in the country. Several attempts were made in the following years to establish banks, including the Joseon Bank (1896), Hanseong Bank (1897) and Daehan Bank (1898), but most of these turned out to be short-lived.

== Daehan Cheon-il Bank ==
On 30 January 1899, the Daehan Cheon-il Bank was created by merchants of Hanseong (now Seoul) with ostensible backing by the Joseon government, which two years before had proclaimed the Korean Empire. Only Korean nationals were allowed to be shareholders, and the government was itself the bank's largest investor. Ownership of the bank was reserved for a narrow elite, with the total number of shareholders growing to only 24 in 1901 and 38 at end-1902. The bank's first president was Joseon senior official Min Byeong-seok, who in 1902 was succeeded by Prince Imperial Yeong, himself succeeded by Kim Gi-yeong (김기영), one of the bank's merchant founders, in 1906, and by Lee Bong-rae in 1909.

The bank became associated with Russian interests. As such, it suffered from Russia's defeat in the Russo-Japanese War, and had to suspend payments in August 1905. It resumed its activity in 1906.

In 1909, the Daehan Cheon-il Bank moved its head office to the street level of the newly erected Gwangtonggwan building, which had just been erected by the Takjibu (financial department) of the Korean imperial government on the thoroughfare later known as Namdaemunno in central Seoul. (The upper level was used as a public assembly hall.) Gwangtonggwan is consequently viewed as the oldest standing bank building in Korea.

== Under Japanese rule ==
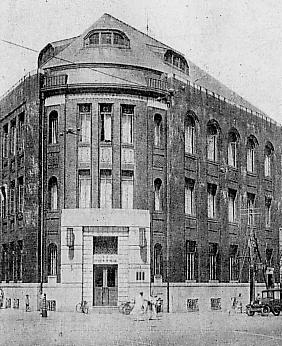
Head office building of Chōsen Industry Bank (1923–1924), then Chōsen Commercial Bank and Korea Commercial Bank until 1965

In 1911, Daehan Cheon-il Bank was renamed by the Japanese colonial authorities as Chōsen Commercial Bank. In 1924, it merged with Chōsen Industry Bank (조선실업은행, established 1913 as Gyeongseong Bank; 경성은행), and moved its head office to the latter's building, across the street northeast from the Bank of Chōsen on the same side of Namdaemunro. The building was demolished in 1965.

== Korea Commercial Bank ==
With the division of Korea, as with other banks previously controlled by Japanese interests, the respective operations of Chōsen Commercial Bank were taken over by public authorities on both sides of the 38th parallel. In North Korea, they were soon merged into the central bank within the country's monobank system.

In South Korea, Chōsen Commercial Bank was renamed Korea Commercial Bank on 24 April 1950. It was listed on the Korea Exchange in 1956, nationalized by the military government in the early 1960s (by expropriating large shareholders on the premise that their wealth had been amassed illicitly), and privatized in 1972, ahead of other Korean commercial banks that were only privatized in the early 1980s.

Following the 1997 Asian financial crisis, Korea Commercial Bank was rescued by the Korea Deposit Insurance Corporation and merged with the similarly troubled Hanil Bank. The merged and recapitalized entity, in which the government held a 95-percent equity stake, was named Hanvit Bank (sometimes transcribed as Hanbit), acquired the distressed Peace Bank in 2001, and was subsequently renamed Woori Bank in 2002.

== See also ==
- Chōsen Industrial Bank
- Bank of Chōsen
