= Bank Woori Saudara =

Indonesian company

PT Bank Woori Saudara Indonesia 1906 Tbk
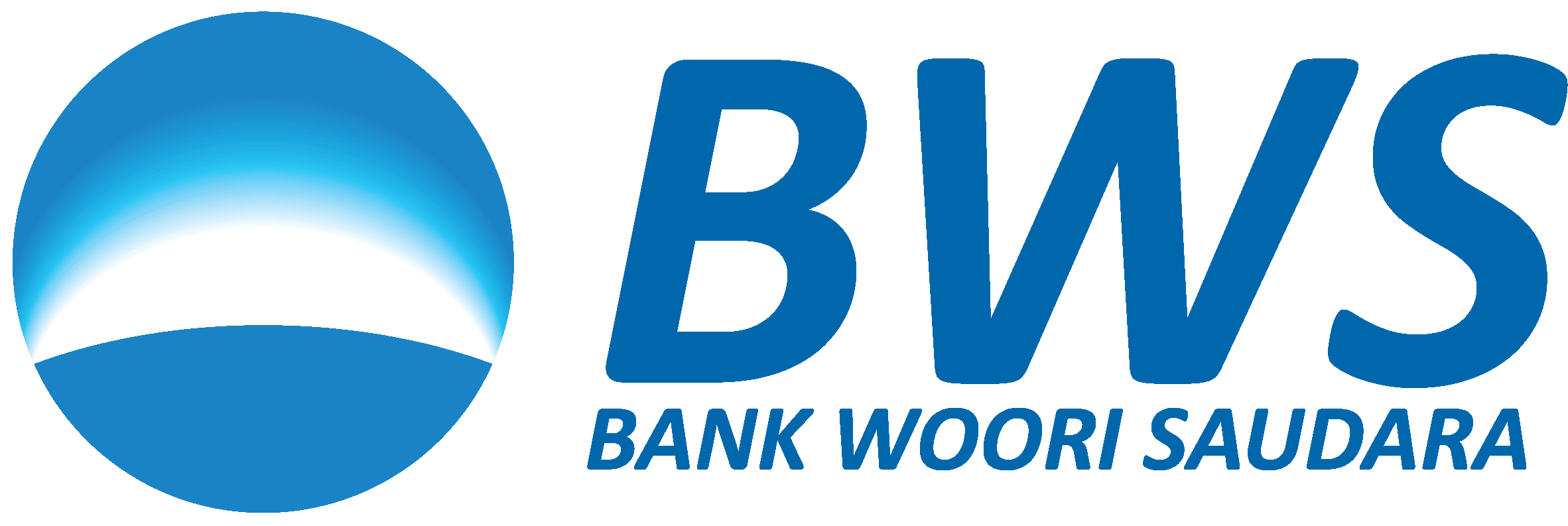
- Company type: Public
- Traded as: IDX: SDRA
- Industry: Banking
- Predecessor: Perkumpulan Himpoenan Soedara (1906)
- Founded: 1906; 120 years ago (as Himpoenan Soedara group); 15 June 1974; 51 years ago (as a company)
- Headquarters: Treasury Tower, Jakarta, Indonesia
- Key people: Kim Eungchul (President Director)
- Services: Financial
- Revenue: ▲ Rp 1.247 trillion (2020)
- Net income: ▲ Rp 536.001 billion (2020)
- Total assets: ▲ Rp 38.05 trillion (2020)
- Total equity: ▲Rp 7.270 trillion (2020)
- Owners: Woori Bank (84.20%); Arifin Panigoro (7.38%)
- Number of employees: 1,455 (2020)
- Website: bankwoorisaudara.com

- Korean Name
- Hangul: 우리소다라은행
- Hanja: 우리소다라銀行
- Revised Romanization: Uri Sodara Eunhaeng
- McCune–Reischauer: Uri Sodara Ŭnhaeng

Bank Woori Saudara (formerly known as Bank Saudara) is an Indonesia-based financial institution. Bank Saudara was founded in 1906 by ten merchants of Pasar Baru in Bandung, West Java. The Bank's products and services include savings and checking accounts, fixed deposits, credit loans and other banking service.

On 14 March 2012, Bank Saudara announced a plan to merge with Bank Woori Indonesia, Indonesian subsidiary of Woori Bank of South Korea. PT Bank Himpunan Saudara 1906, Tbk (Bank Saudara) has obtained approval from Bank Indonesia (BI) via an approval letter on December 30, 2013 related to the purchase of 27% (twenty-seven percent) Bank Saudara’s shares by the Woori Bank of Korea and the remaining 6% (six percent) has been approved in advance on April 16, 2013. Earlier this year, Woori achieved one of its long-awaited overseas operation goals ― Indonesia’s central bank approved Woori’s acquisition of a 33-percent stake in Bank.

== Board of directors ==
=== Commissioner ===
Title	Name
Komisaris Utama	Arief Budiman
Komisaris Independen	Ahmad Fajarprana
Komisaris Independen	Adi Haryadi

=== Director ===
Title	Name
Direktur Utama	Kim Eungchul
Direktur Bisnis Support	Edwin Sulaeman
Direktur Risiko dan Kepatuhan	Wuryanto
Direktur Korporat	Kim Wook Bae
Direktur Konsumer	Abdurachman Hadi
Direktur TI dan Jaringan & Operasi	Benny Sudarsono Tan
