= Citibank Korea =

Franchise subsidiary of Citigroup

- Company type: Subsidiary
- Industry: Finance
- Founded: 1983; 43 years ago
- Headquarters: Seoul, South Korea
- Area served: South Korea
- Number of employees: 3,681 (2011)
- Parent: Citigroup
- Website: http://www.citibank.co.kr/

Citibank Korea (Korean: 한국씨티은행) is a South Korean subsidiary of Citigroup. Its core is the Korean-American Bank or KorAm Bank, founded in 1983 and acquired by Citi two decades later.

Citibank Korea was named the worst bank in terms of consumer complaints by the Financial Supervisory Service (FSS) in 2015.

== History ==
The Korean American (KorAm) Bank was founded in March 1983, as a joint venture in which Bank of America held 50.1 percent with the rest of the capital being shared between 13 major Korean companies. In 2003, KorAm Bank was acquired by Citibank.

== Branches ==
Citibank Korea currently has ATMs available in all 134 of its branches, facilitating transactions with most international cards. However, starting in 2017, Citibank Korea has set a goal to reduce its branch network from 134 to 32 in the country.

== Products & Services ==
Citibank Korea offers consumers and institutions a range of financial products and services, including consumer banking. The company also offers credit cards in Korea.

== See also ==
- List of banks in South Korea
