= Seoul Bank =

1959–2002 South Korean bank

- Native name: 서울은행
- Formerly: Seoul Bank (1959–1976); Seoul Trust Bank (1976–1995)
- Type: Commercial bank
- Industry: Banking
- Founded: December 1959
- Defunct: 2002
- Fate: Nationalised and merged
- Successor: Hana Bank
- Headquarters: Seoul, South Korea
- Area served: South Korea
- Owner: Government of South Korea (1997–2002)

Seoul Bank (Korean: 서울은행), known from 1976 to 1995 as Seoul Trust Bank (서울신탁은행), was a major bank in South Korea, originally established as a regional bank in 1959. By the mid-1990s, it was one of the five most prominent Korean banks, together with Chohung Bank, Korea Commercial Bank, Korea First Bank, and Hanil Bank. It was determined to be insolvent during the 1997 Asian financial crisis, however, and was taken over by the Korean authorities, then merged into Hana Bank.

== Overview ==
Seoul Bank was established in December 1959 as part of the Bank of Korea's policy of favoring the creation of regional banks across the country. As such, its activity was initially concentrated in the Seoul Metropolitan Area. It soon expanded beyond that remit, however, by opening a branch in 1962 in the central Nampo-dong neighborhood of Busan.

In August 1976, Seoul Bank absorbed Korea Trust Bank, and changed its name to Seoul Trust Bank. It kept that name for nearly two decades before changing it back to Seoul Bank in June 1995. Meanwhile, it was privatized in 1982, as part of the limited financial liberalization effort undertaken by then-president Chun Doo-hwan.

In December 1997, the Korean government took over Seoul Bank after it had been determined to be insolvent, diluting the existing shareholders by a factor of 8 to 1 under targeted emergency legislation. As a consequence, the government together with the recently established Korea Deposit Insurance Corporation held a combined equity stake of about 94 percent, similar to the simultaneously rescued Korea First Bank.

The government started a process to sell Seoul Bank in 1998. In February 1999, HSBC announced its purchase of a 70-percent stake, but that proposed transaction was called off six months later. In August 2002, it was announced that Seoul Bank would be merged with Hana Bank, as the latter had been selected in a competitive bidding process against Lone Star Funds.

== See also ==
- List of banks in South Korea
