= Industrial Bank of Korea =

South Korean state-owned bank

- Native name: 중소기업은행
- Company type: Public; State-owned
- Traded as: KRX: 024110
- Industry: Banking
- Founded: 1961
- Headquarters: Seoul, South Korea
- Area served: Worldwide
- Key people: Kim Seong-tae (CEO)
- Products: Corporate banking, retail banking, mortgage loans, private banking, wealth management
- Owner: MOEF
- Rating: Standard & Poor's: AA− Moody's: Aa2; Fitch Ratings: AA−
- Website: global.ibk.co.kr

- Korean name
- Hangul: 중소기업은행
- Hanja: 中小企業銀行
- RR: Jungsogieop eunhaeng
- MR: Chungsogiŏp ŭnhaeng

Industrial Bank of Korea (IBK; Korean: 중소기업은행) is a state-owned bank headquartered in Jung-gu, Seoul, South Korea. Under the Industrial Bank of Korea Act, IBK was established to promote small and medium-sized businesses and improve their economic status by providing an efficient credit system.

== International Locations ==
- Cambodia (Phnom Penh)
- Mainland China (Beijing, Shenzhen, Qingdao, Shenyang, Wuhan, Suzhou, Tianjin, and Yantai)
- Hong Kong (Hong Kong Island)
- India (New Delhi)
- Indonesia
- Japan (Tokyo)
- Malaysia (Kuala Lumpur, Georgia Town, Ipoh, and Selangor)
- Singapore
- Thailand (Bangkok)
- Myanmar (Yangon)
- Laos (Vientiane and Luang Prabang)
- Philippines (Metro Manila)
- Poland (Wrocław)
- United Kingdom (London)
- United States (New York)
- Vietnam (Hanoi and Ho Chi Minh)

== See also ==
- Economy of South Korea
- List of Banks in South Korea
- Hwaseong IBK Altos
