= Korea Development Bank =

South Korean state-owned enterprise

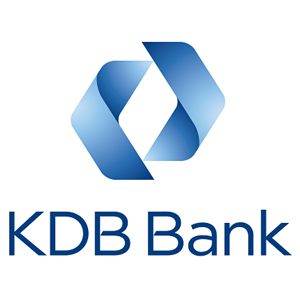

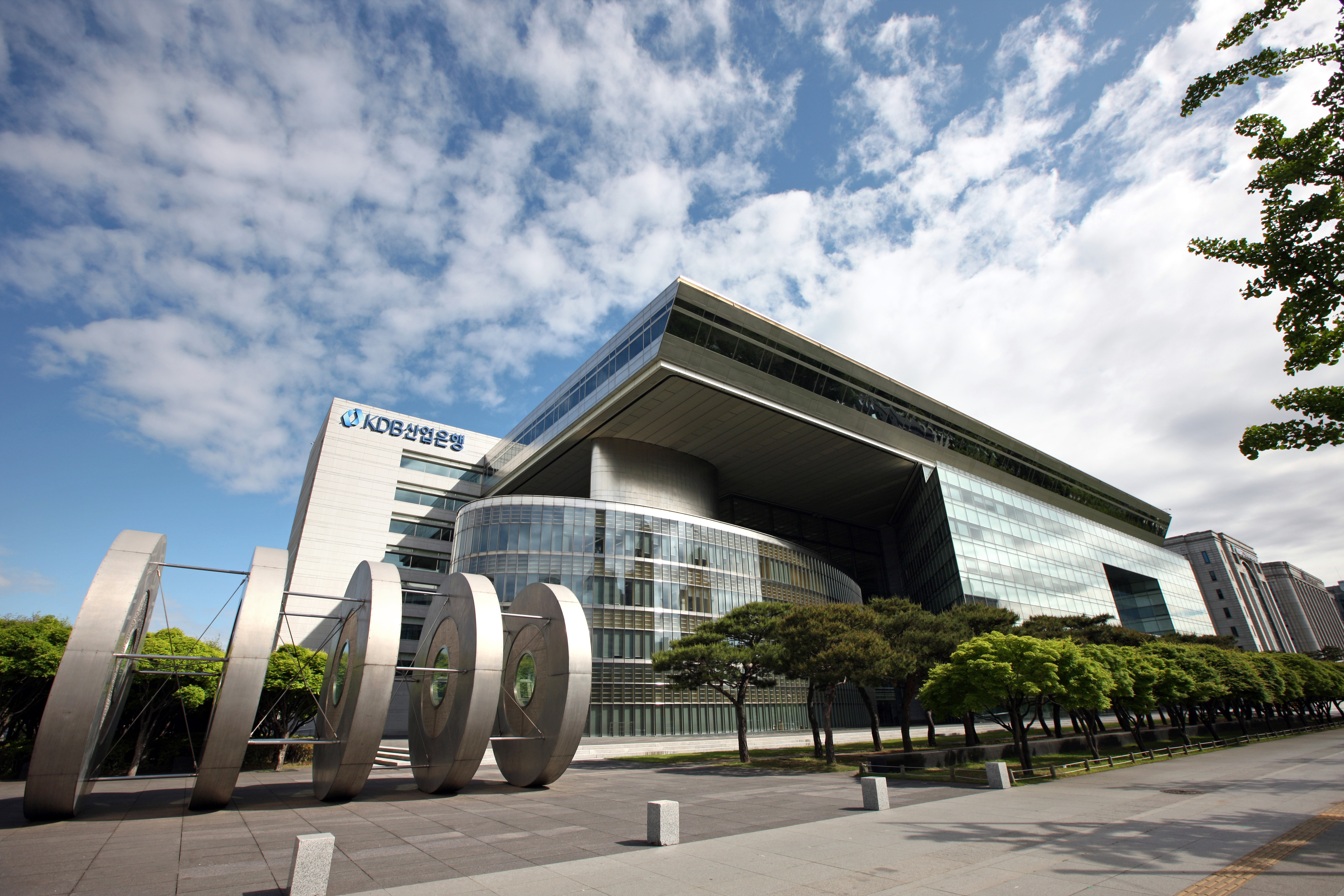
- Headquarters of KDB in Seoul
- Native name: 한국산업은행 (韓國產業銀行)
- Company type: State-owned enterprise
- Industry: Banking
- Founded: 1954; 72 years ago
- Headquarters: Seoul, Republic of Korea (South Korea)
- Number of locations: 69 domestic, 22 international
- Products: Financial services
- Services: Corporate banking Investment banking
- Revenue: US$3.2b (2018)
- Net income: US$0.6b (2018)
- Total assets: US$233.9b (2018)
- Owner: Republic of Korea government
- Number of employees: ~3,200 (as of Dec 2018)
- Rating: Aa2 (Moody's, 2018), AA (S&P, 2018), AA− (Fitch, 2018)
- Website: www.kdb.co.kr

Korea Development Bank (KDB Bank) is a South Korean state-owned development bank which aims to encourage the industrial development of South Korea.

It was founded in 1954 in accordance with The Korea Development Bank Act to finance and manage major industrial projects to expedite industrial development of Korea.

As of 2018, it was the 61st biggest global bank according to The Bankers top 1000 World Bank List. KDB Bank has not only fostered the growth of strategic industries but also facilitates the turnaround of troubled companies through restructuring and providing capital for strategic development projects.

Since 2000, it has diversified into investment banking services and operates as a Commercial and Investment Bank. Nevertheless, it is a major restructuring player and has saved many big companies during major financial crisis, especially in the 1997 Asian financial crisis and the 2008 financial crisis.

== History ==
KDB Bank was founded in 1954 to supply and manage major industrial capital to help develop Korean industries and the national economy, taking over the viable operations of the former Chôsen Industrial Bank. For the half century since then, KDB Bank has faithfully fulfilled its role as a government-run bank, anticipating and coping with changes in the economic and financial environment.

In the 1950s, KDB supported the nation's economic rehabilitation by restoration of industrial facilities destroyed during the Korean War. This including basic industries such as electricity, coal, and cement. By the end of 1955, it accounted for over 40 percent of total bank lending in South Korea.

In the 1970s, KDB solidified the development of South Korea, by providing funding to heavy industry from energy to chemical and export-oriented industries. Meeting the government's five-year economic development plan and the initiation of new financial businesses such as security underwriting and corporate bond guarantees. Its share of total equipment investment lending in the country, which had declined in the 1960s, rose from 40.3 percent in 1972 to 44.7 percent in 1975 and 49.6 percent in 1979.

In the 1980s, KDB sustaining long-term industrial financing by intensive support for automobile and electronic industries. This was done by providing long-term facility financing in order to construct a stable growth base of the national economy. It also issued Industrial Finance Bonds (IFBs) overseas to create an independent fund, carrying out the role of the primary long-term facility financial institution.

During the 1990s, KDB providing comprehensive corporate banking services to support technology-intensive industries including semiconductors. It also provided and supported comprehensive corporate banking services to help global expansion of corporate clients.

In the 2000s, KDB moved to a new financial policy amid market-oriented economic changes. This included the completion of Universal Banking Services with the four core businesses: Corporate Banking, Investment Banking, International Banking, and Corporate Restructuring/Consulting. The support for nation-wide infrastructure projects and the resolution of financial distress by taking leadership in corporate restructuring.

During the 2010s, KDB shifted its focus from support of major conglomerates to medium-sized enterprises. Assisted development under the Korean Fourth Industrial Revolution by widening the investment fund. Proactively engaged in corporate restructuring with support of the government of large corporations to avoid major financial distress.

== Operations and services ==
KDB provides corporate Banking, investment banking, international banking and indirect financing and consulting services to businesses and banks in South Korea.

== Key financial data ==
Financial data (in millions of US$)
Year	2023	2024
Total Assets	233,940	247,562
Total Liabilities	203,129	216,059
Shareholder's Equity	30,811	31,503
Net Operating Revenue	3,241	3,687
[Net Interest Income]	1,872	2,115
[Non-interest Income]	1,369	1,572
Provision for credit losses	(335)	1,287
Operating Income	2,038	720
Non-operating Income	(978)	730
Net Profit	635	529

== Subsidiary ==
- KDB Capital - Founded as a leasing company and diversified into corporate banking and VC/PE investment
- KDB Infra (KDB Infrastructure Investments Asset Management) -Major infrastructure project investor in Korea
- KDB Investment - Corporate restructuring PEF for assets under KDB Bank

== See also ==
- List of banks in South Korea
- List of national development banks
