= Woori Bank =

South Korean bank

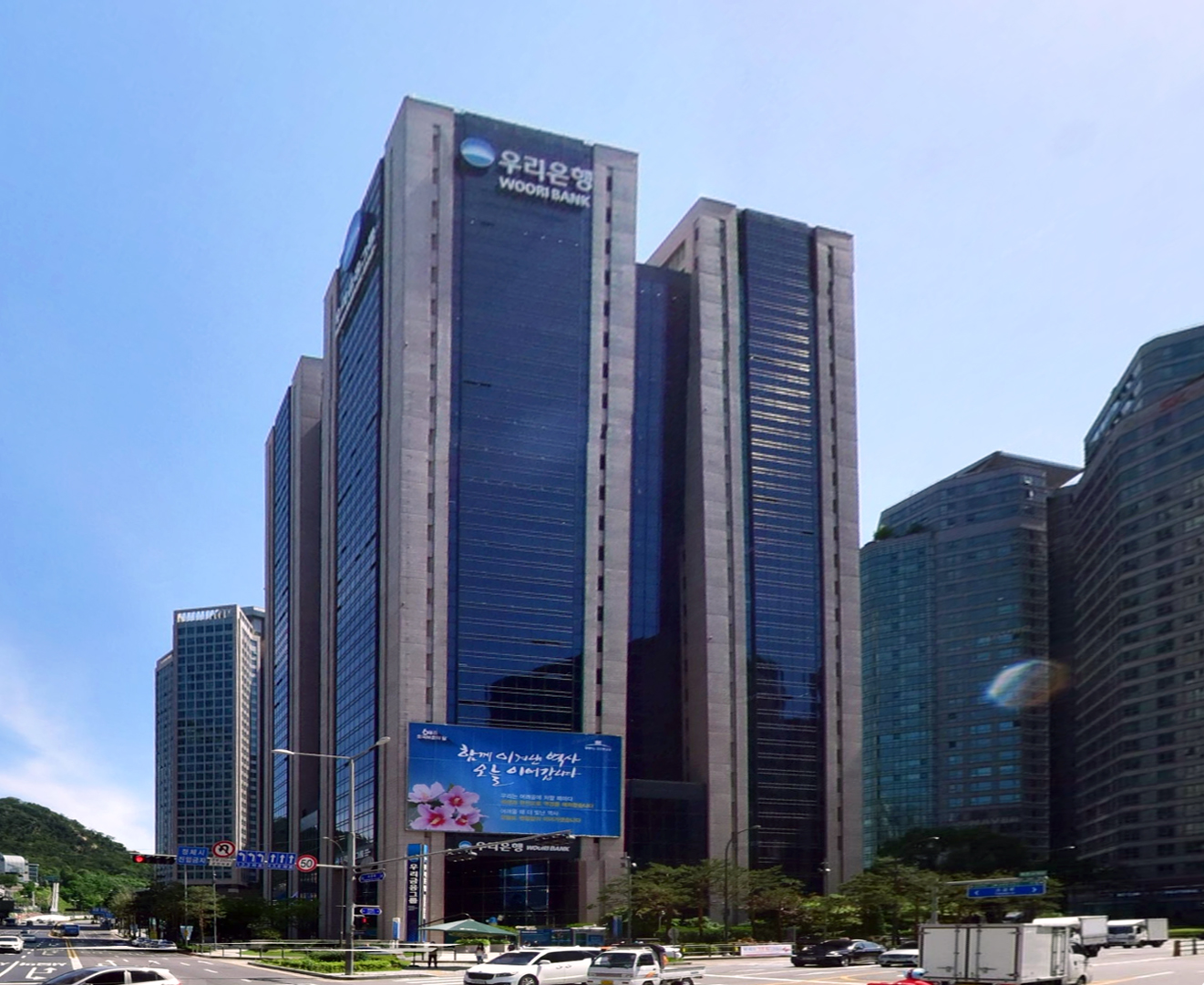
- Woori Bank Headquarters at Jung-gu, Seoul, South Korea
- Native name: 주식회사 우리은행
- Formerly: Hanvit Bank
- Type: Subsidiary
- Industry: Financial services
- Founded: 30 January 1899; 127 years ago
- Headquarters: Jung-gu, Seoul, South Korea
- Area served: Worldwide
- Key people: Jin Wan Jung, (president & CEO); Hyun Keun Yang (Standing Audit Committee Member/Director)
- Products: Retail banking; corporate banking; investment banking; insurance; private banking; private equity; mortgage loans; credit cards; investment management; wealth management; asset management; mutual funds; exchange-traded funds; index funds
- Revenue: ▲ ₩12,532 billion (FY 2019)
- Operating income: ▲ ₩2,800 billion (FY 2019)
- Net income: ▼ ₩2,038 billion (FY 2019)
- Total assets: ▲ ₩361,981 billion (FY 2019)
- Total equity: ▲ ₩25,493 billion (FY 2019)
- Number of employees: 15,529 (2019)
- Parent: Woori Financial Group
- Rating: Moody's: A1; S&P: A Fitch: A-
- Website: go.wooribank.com

Woori Bank (Korean: 우리은행, romanized: Uri Eunhaeng, lit. 'Our Bank') is a Korean multinational bank headquartered in Seoul. It is one of the four largest domestic banks in South Korea and has a strong presence in commercial banking and corporate finance in South Korea. Tracing its roots to the Daehan Cheon-il Bank, founded in 1899, it went through multiple transformations until adopting its current name in 2002. By then, it was South Korea's second-largest bank, behind Kookmin Bank.

As of 2020, Woori ranks 95th among the largest banks in the world in terms of total assets with 311,852 billion in USD as of the end of 2019.

== History ==
Woori Bank traces its origins to the establishment of Daehan Cheon-il Bank in 1899, subsequently renamed Joseon Commercial Bank in 1911 and Korea Commercial Bank in 1950. Woori Bank's Jongno branch is located in the Gwangtonggwan building, which is considered the oldest continuously operating bank building in Korea. On March 5, 2001, the branch was registered as a Seoul City Historic Landmark.

Following the 1997 Asian financial crisis, Korea Commercial Bank merged with Hanil Bank to become Hanvit Bank, simultaneously with a public capital injection that made the Korean government the dominant shareholder, then in 2001 with Peace Bank, and adopted the name Woori Bank in 2002. In 2014, after some amalgamation proceedings related to its parent company, Woori Bank absorbed Woori Financial Group.

The privatization process was a protracted effort. The Korean government reduced its equity holding in Woori Bank in stages, selling a 29.7 percent block in November 2016, another 9.3 percent in November 2021, and its residual holding in March 2024.

== Business ==
=== Branches ===
The following lists all major offices and branches. All data are as of the end of January 2018 for Overseas and June 2020 for South Korea.

==== Domestic ====
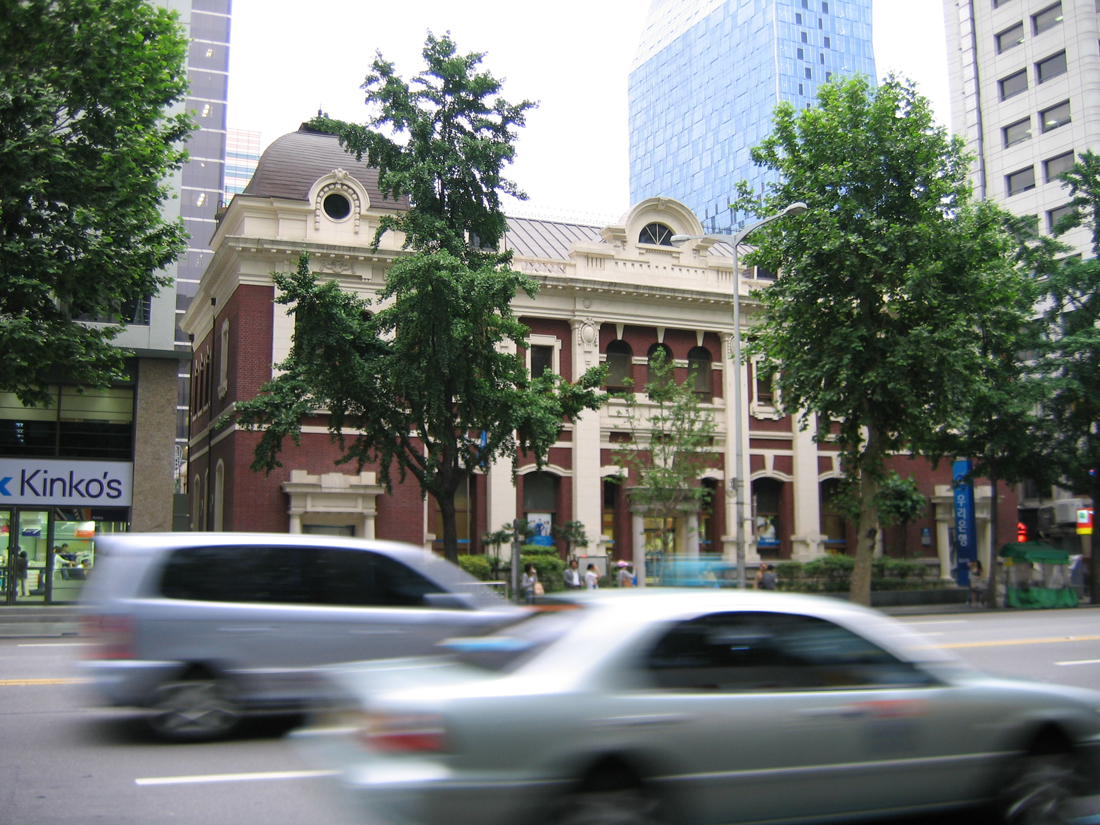
Woori Bank Jongno Banking Center

- Number of branches and offices: 862

==== Overseas ====
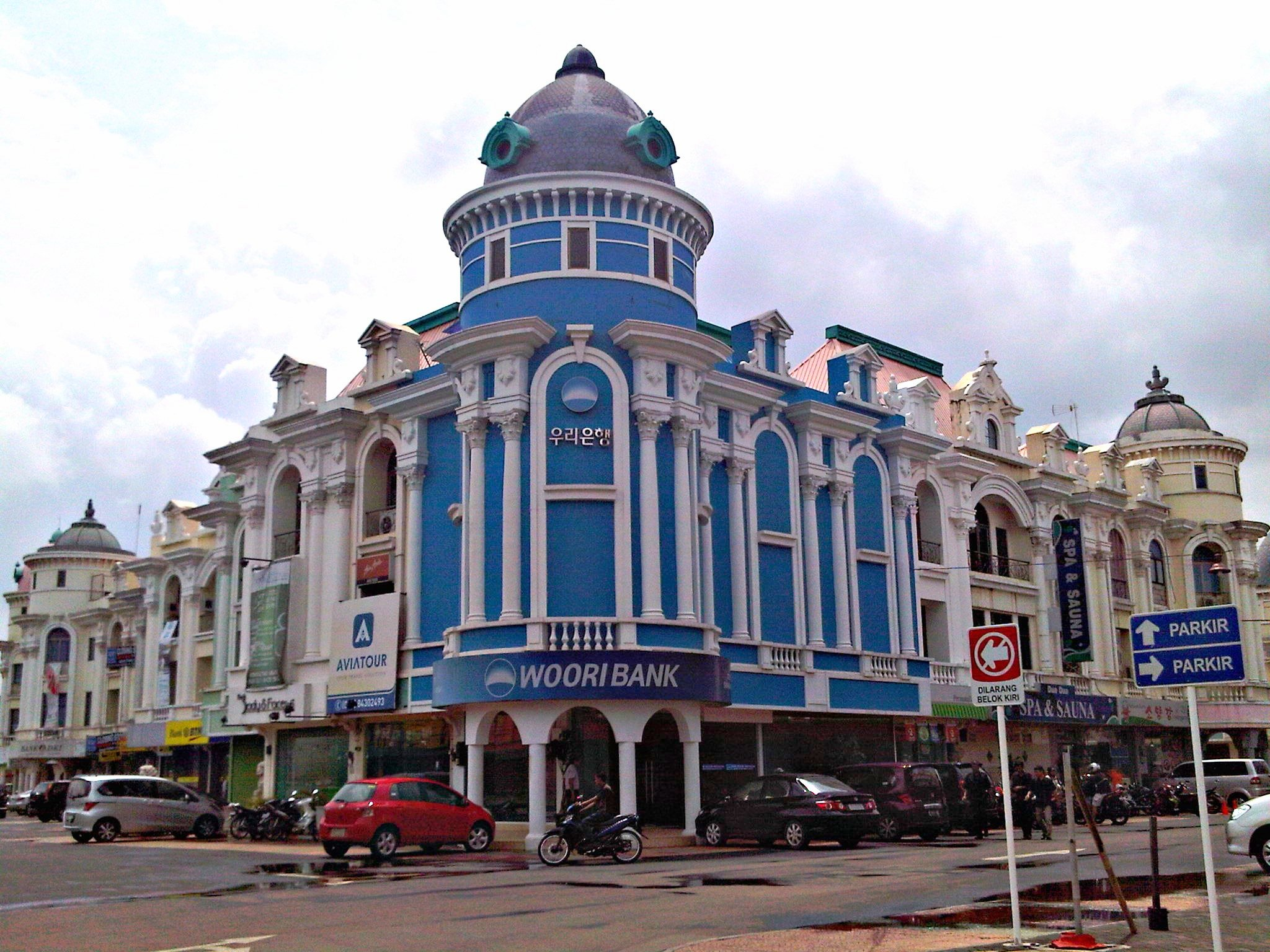
Woori Bank in West Java, Indonesia

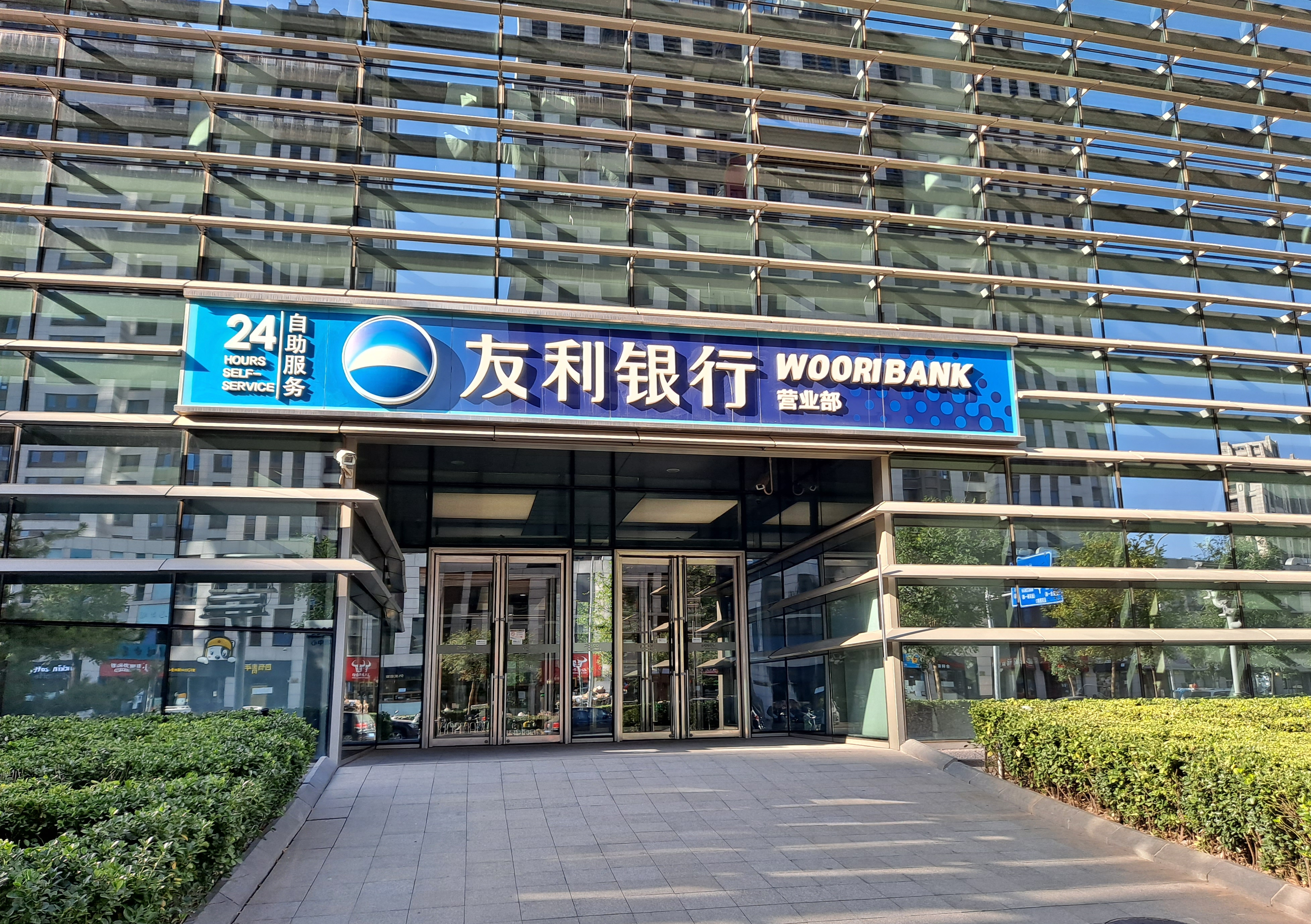
Woori Bank in Beijing

- United States as Woori America Bank (multiple locations)

Through its subsidiary, Woori America Bank, the bank provides a specialized "Pre-Opening Account Service." This service allows South Korean nationals, including international students (F-1) and expatriates (L-1/E-2), to establish a U.S. bank account and transfer funds before relocating to the United States.

- London, United Kingdom
- Singapore
- Tokyo, Japan
- Hanoi, Vietnam; Ho Chi Minh, Vietnam
- Bahrain, Bahrain
- Dhaka, Bangladesh
- Chennai, India
- Manila, Philippines as Wealthbank (Woori Bank Subsidiary) A Development Bank
- Dubai, UAE
- Sydney, Australia
- Jakarta, Indonesia as Woori Saudara Bank
- Moscow, Russia; Saint Petersburg, Russia as Woori Bank Russia
- Beijing, China as Woori Bank of China Limited
- Hong Kong, China, as Woori Investment Bank
- São Paulo, Brazil as Brazil Woori Bank
- Yangon, Myanmar as Woori Finance Myanmar
- Phnom Penh, Cambodia as Woori Finance Cambodia
- Kuala Lumpur, Malaysia (Office)
- Teheran, Iran (Office)
- Kaesong Industrial Complex, North Korea (former)

In 2004, Woori Bank opened its Gaeseong Industrial Complex branch, in Gaeseong, North Korea, the first foreign bank to do so in North Korea. Woori Bank has operations in Bangladesh, India and Indonesia. On 14 March 2012, its Indonesian subsidiary, Bank Woori Indonesia, announced a plan to merge with a local bank, Bank Saudara. In April 2012, Woori Bank opened its first branch in India at Chennai.

In August 2025, Woori Bank opened a branch in Austin, Texas, United States, becoming the first Korean bank to establish a foothold in the city. This marked Woori’s third branch in the southern United States, following Dallas, Texas and Duluth, Georgia.

=== Clientele ===
Woori Bank has major clientele from all over South Korea, including but not limited to: Samsung Electronics, CJ Group, Hanwha, Korea Institute of Science and Technology (KAIST), Pohang University of Science and Technology (POSTECH), Yonsei University, and Korean University of Foreign Studies (HUFS).

== See also ==
- List of banks in South Korea
- Woori Financial Group
