= Namdaemunno =

Road in Seoul, South Korea

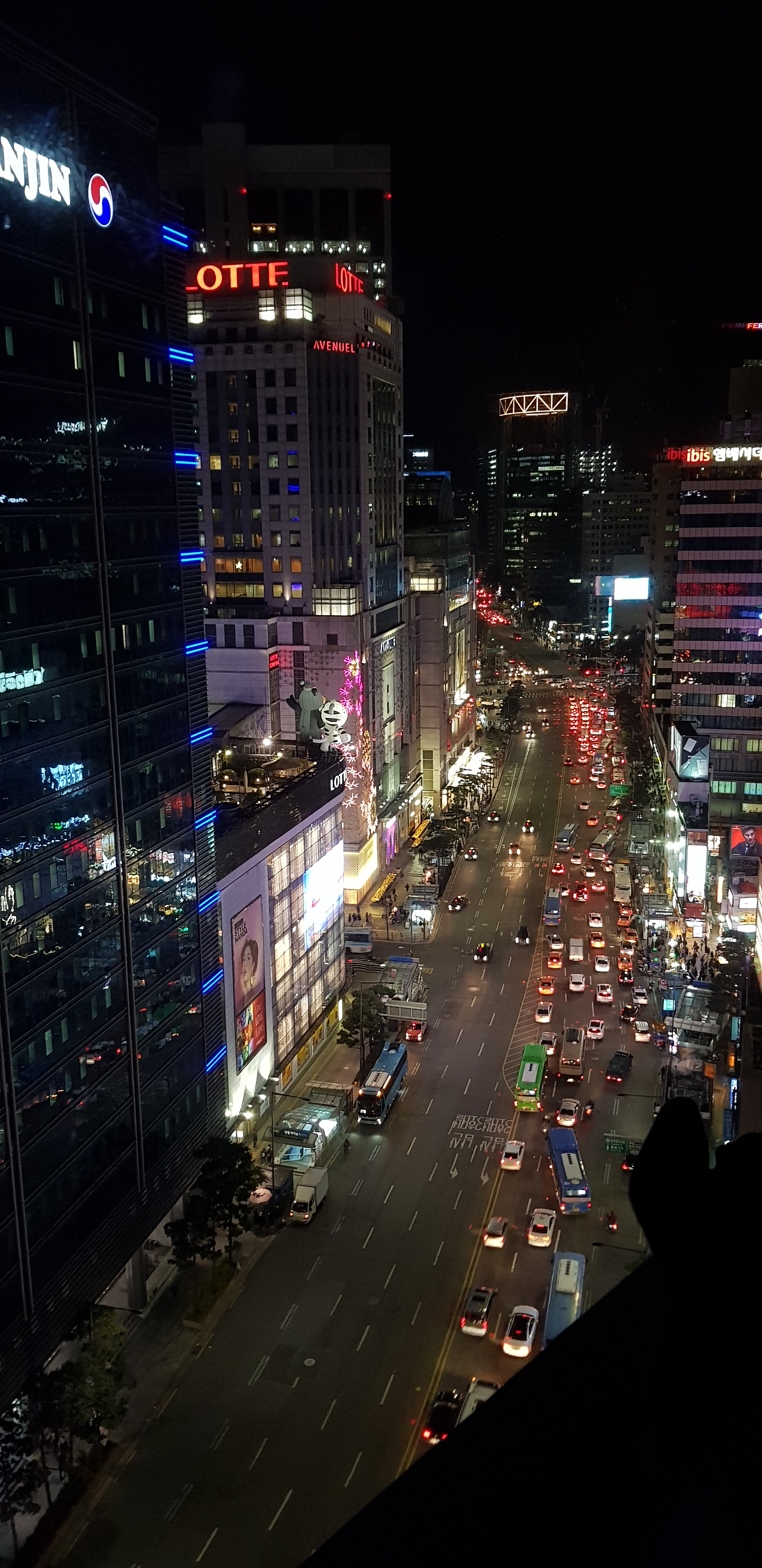

Route information
- Length: 2 km (1.2 mi)

Major junctions
- From: Seoul Station

Location
- Country: South Korea

Highway system
- Transport in South Korea

- Namdaemunno
- Hangul: 남대문로
- Hanja: 南大門路
- Revised Romanization: Namdaemunno
- McCune–Reischauer: Namdaemunno

Namdaemunno (Korean: 남대문로), also known as Namdaemun-ro, is a major thoroughfare in the central districts of Seoul, South Korea and a two-way road consisting of 8 lanes. With a 2 km length and a 40~50m width, Namdaemunno originates at Bosingak in Jongno District and terminates at Seoul Station in Jung District.

Historical buildings on this street include the Gwangtonggwan, the oldest continuously operating bank building in Korea. It was registered as one of city's protected monuments on March 5, 2001.

== See also ==
- List of streets in Seoul
- Sejongno
- Namdaemun
