= Kookmin Bank =

South Korean bank

- Company type: Subsidiary
- Industry: financial sector
- Founded: 1 November 1963; 62 years ago
- Headquarters: Seoul, South Korea
- Key people: Hur Yin (CEO)
- Products: Financial services
- Number of employees: 26,000
- Parent: KB Financial Group

Korean name
- Hangul: 국민은행
- Hanja: 國民銀行
- RR: Gungmin eunhaeng
- MR: Kungmin ŭnhaeng
- Website: omoney.kbstar.com

Kookmin Bank (Korean: 국민은행, romanized: Gungmin Eunhaeng, lit. 'Citizen Bank'), also known as KB Kookmin Bank, is a bank headquartered in Seoul, South Korea. It was the largest bank in Korea and the 60th largest in the world as of 2017. The name Kookmin Bank is a contraction of Citizens National Bank, an English name by which it also used to be referred to in the past.

== History ==
The Citizens National Bank was founded by the Korean government in late 1962, initially focused on providing financial services for middle- and low-income consumers. Its privatization process was initiated by the sale of a 10 percent stake by initial public offering in 1994. Meanwhile, Kookmin Bank expanded abroad by opening operations in Luxembourg in 1991, Tokyo in 1992, Singapore in 1994, and Hong Kong in 1996, followed by other locations around the world.

Following the 1997 Asian financial crisis, Kookmin Bank absorbed a number of distressed or insolvent banks, including Daedong Bank in 1998, then Long-Term Credit Bank as announced on 11 September 1998, then Housing & Commercial Bank in 2001. In May 1999, Goldman Sachs invested $500 million into KB and became its largest single shareholder with a 17 percent equity stake, ahead of the Korean government which at the time held 7.2 percent. By 2002, Goldman Sachs had sold most of its investment with a significant profit. At that point, Kookmin had become the largest bank in South Korea. The privatization process was completed in December 2003.

In September 2004, Kookmin Bank said it would restate its 2003 and 2004 earnings after a financial watchdog found that the bank avoided $270 million in taxes.

KB further acquired various companies include credit card, insurance and brokerage firms, transforming into the current financial group in 2008.

In April 2025, Kookmin Bank raised $700 million in foreign-currency bonds amid strong investor demand, issuing $400 million in three-year notes and $300 million in five-year notes. The offering was heavily oversubscribed, allowing the bank to price the bonds at lower coupon rates and use the proceeds to refinance maturing debt.

On 2 December 2025, the Moscow Arbitration Court ordered Kookmin Bank to pay $109.2 million in damages to MTS Bank over funds that had been held on a correspondent account and frozen in 2023 following the imposition of anti-Russian sanctions. The court rejected MTS Bank's additional claim for interest, while Kookmin Bank stated that it did not accept the ruling and argued that the claimant had acted negligently by continuing to conduct US-dollar transactions after geopolitical developments.

== See also ==
- Cheongju KB Stars
- Goyang KB Kookmin Bank FC, a defunct South Korean football team
- Rainy Sky SA v Kookmin Bank
- List of South Korean companies
- List of Banks in South Korea
