= CBV Vietnam Bond Indexes =

CBV Vietnam bond Indexes (Copyright No 94/2008/QTG) is a listing of bonds or fixed income instruments and a statistic reflecting the composite value of its components. It is used as a benchmark to evaluate the market value of all Vietnamese bonds.

== Overview ==
CBV Vietnam bond Indexes, renamed as Vietnam Bond Indexes since 2009, is the first and the currently the only index family of the Vietnam listed bond market. The indexes family contains one composite index, CBV Vietnam Bond Composite Index, and its 15 sub-indices, which includes four bond indices to track bonds in the emerging Vietnamese bond market.

1. CBV Government Bond Index
2. CBV Corporate Bond Index
3. CBV Convertible Bond Index
4. CBV Interbank bond Index

== CBV Government Bond Index ==
CBV Government Bond Index is an equally weighted basket of government bonds in the Vietnamese bond market. It includes Treasury bonds, Municipal bonds, Agency bonds, and Supranational bonds.

== CBV Corporate Bond Index ==
CBV Corporate Bond Index is an equally weighted basket of corporate bonds in the Vietnamese bond market. The objective of the Index is to capture the return of readily tradable, high-grade Vietnamese corporate bonds. The CBV Vietnam Corporate Bond Index includes the Utilities Bond index, the Financials bond index, and the Industrials bond index.

== CBV Covertible Bond Index ==
CBV Vietnam Covertible Bond Index

== CBV Interbank Bond Index ==
CBV Vietnam Interbank bond Index is an index created in order to adapt to the rapid development of the interbank bond market and to support OTC government bond transactions introduced by state-owned commercial banks. The Interbank Bond Index reflects capital gains, accrued interest, and reinvested earnings. It also provides the supervisory authorities with a picture of the bond market situation.

== See also ==
- CBV Vietnam finance indices
- Vietnam Bond Indexes
- Vietnam Investor Confidence Index
- VND Index
- Vietnam Consumer Confidence Index
- Woori CBV Securities Corporation
