= BCV =

BCV could refer to:

== Transport ==
- Balaclava railway station, Melbourne
- Bruce Grove railway station, London, England

=== Airports ===
- Birchwood Airport (FAA LID code), an airport near Birchwood, Alaska
- Hector Silva Airstrip (IATA code), Belmopan, Belize

== Banks ==
- Central Bank of Venezuela
  - BCV Building, headquarters of the bank, Caracas, Venezuela
- Banque cantonale vaudoise, which is a bank in Switzerland

== Science and medicine ==
- Beclabuvir, an antiviral drug for the treatment of hepatitis C virus
- Bovine coronavirus, an RNA virus

== Other uses ==
- Bain Capital Ventures, the venture capital division of Bain Capital
- BCV: Battle Construction Vehicles, a fighting game for the PlayStation 2
- BCV Volley Cup, former name of the Montreux Volley Masters women's volleyball tournament, Switzerland
- Bristol Commercial Vehicles, a subsidiary of Bristol Tramways
- Bulgnéville Contrex Vittel FC (BCV), a French football club
- Business continuance volume
- GLV/BCV or BCV, the callsign of a TV station in Bendigo and regional Victoria, Australia
- Melbourne School of Theology, formerly known as the Bible College of Victoria

== See also ==
- BCVS
- BVC (disambiguation)
- VBC (disambiguation)
- VCB (disambiguation)
- CBV (disambiguation)
- CVB (disambiguation)
