= Bien Viet Securities =

Vietnam provider of financial and investment services

- Type: Joint venture with Woori Investment & Securities
- Headquarters: Hanoi
- Services: Financial services Financial market indices Portfolio analytics
- Website: www.cbv.vn

Bien Viet Securities J.S.C. (CBV), a former name of Woori CBV Securities Corporation, is Vietnam provider of financial and investment services. CBV has been well known as the first and largest provider of Vietnam’s financial market indexes and economic indicators. Vietnam Securities Indexes is the first equity index that composes all stocks listed on the two exchanges in Hanoi and Ho Chi Minh City. Vietnam Finance Indexes family is the first family of Vietnam finance indexes to be sponsored and introduced by Bloomberg to global financial institutions. The index system developed by CBV is the world's largest index family for Vietnam with over 450 equity indexes, 50 fixed income indexes, and over 50 indexes in other categories.

The company's most known indexes include Vietnam Securities Indexes, Vietnam Bond Indexes, Vietnam Investor Confidence Index, VND Index, Vietnam Consumer Confidence Index.

== Shareholder ==
CBV's first major shareholder is Woori Investment & Securities Ltd., whose mother company is Woori Financial Group, the largest financial institution in South Korea.

== See also ==
- Woori CBV Securities Corporation
- Vietnam Investor Confidence Index
- VND Index
- Vietnam Consumer Confidence Index
- Vietnam Securities Indexes
- Vietnam Bond Indexes
- Woori Financial Group
- Woori Investment & Securities
