= VCB =

VCB may refer to:

- Nut Tree Airport (FCC id: VCB), Vacaville, Solano County, California, USA
- Real Aero Club de Vizcaya (ICAO airline code: VCB) of Spain, see List of airline codes (R)
- Veronica Campbell-Brown (born 1982) Jamaican sprinter
- Victoria Commercial Bank, Kenya
- Village Community Boathouse, Manhattan, NYC, NYS, USA; a non-profit promoting nautical activity
- V_{CB} (electronics), the voltage across the collector and the base, in a transistor; see Active load
- California Victim Compensation Board
- Vuelve Candy B. (1988-1996) racehorse
- VCB (2007 song), song by Kendrick Scott off the album The Source (Kendrick Scott album)

== See also ==
- VBC (disambiguation)
- BVC (disambiguation)
- BCV (disambiguation)
- CBV (disambiguation)
- CVB (disambiguation)
