= CBV Vietnam finance indices =

CBV Vietnam finance indices comprise the only index that reflects the performance of the stock market of Vietnam. They were introduced to the Vietnamese financial market by Bien Viet Securities JSC at the beginning of 2007. The Indices were founded by the Council of Corporates and Businesses of Vietnam.

== Four indices ==
They include four subsets which track the emerging Vietnamese securities market.

- CBV Equity Indices
- CBV Fixed Income Indices
- CBV Strategy Indices
- CBV Alternative Indices

=== CBV equity indices ===
CBV equity indices is used as a benchmark to evaluate the market value of all Vietnam stock markets, Ha Noi and Ho Chi Minh City Securities Trading Centers. CBV equity indices includes nine indices to track stock in emerging Vietnamese stock market such as: CBV Index, CBV LargeCap, CBV MidCap, CBV SmallCap, CBV Sector, CBV value, CBV Growth, CBV Companies, SANOTC/CBV index

=== CBV fixed income indices ===
CBV fixed income indices is a listing of bonds or fixed income instruments and a statistic reflecting the composite value of its components. It is used as a benchmark to evaluate the market value of all Vietnam bonds. CBV fixed income indices includes five bond indices to track bonds in emerging Vietnamese bond market.

- CBV Composite Index
- CBV Government Bond Index
- CBV Corporate Bond Index
- CBV Convertible Bond Index
- CBV Interbank bond Index

=== CBV strategy indices ===
CBV strategy indices includes three indices in emerging Vietnamese securities market.

- CBV Aggressive Investment Indices
- CBV Moderate Investment Indices
- CBV Conservative Investment Indices

=== CBV alternative indices ===
CBV alternative indices includes eight indices to track in emerging Vietnamese securities market, such as: CBV Real Estate Index, CBV Hanoi real estate index, CBV HCMcity real estate index, CBV Vietnam officer index, CBV Vietnam apartment, CBV Vietnam retail index, CBV Vietnam warehouse index, CBV Vietnam commodity index.

== See also ==
- CBV Equity Indices
- CBV Index
- CBV MidCap
- CBV SmallCap
- CBV Sector
- CBV Fixed Income Indices
- CBV Vietnam Bond Index
