= Vietnam Securities Indexes =

This article gives an overview of Vietnam Securities Indexes.

== History ==
CBV Index family has been officially renamed as Vietnam Securities Index (VSI) family since September, 2009.

== Overview ==
- Woori CBV Securities Corporation, the world's largest provider of Vietnam's financial market indexes and economic indicators, is the pioneer to explore and deliver Financial Intelligence of Vietnam.
- Vietnam Securities Indexes (formerly CBV Index), Vietnam's first free float market capitalization weighted indexes, are Vietnam's first equity indexes that compose all stocks listed on the two exchanges in Hanoi and Ho Chi Minh City. Vietnam Securities Index family is the first family of Vietnam finance indexes to be sponsored and introduced by Bloomberg L.P. to global financial institutions.
- The index system developed by CBV is the world's largest and most diversified index family for Vietnam financial markets with over 450 kinds of equity indexes, 50 kinds of fixed income indexes, and over 50 other kinds of indexes in other categories. Among them are:
1. Vietnam Bond Index - Composite (formerly CBV Vietnam Bond Composite Index)
2. Vietnam OTC Indexes (formerly CBV OTC Index)
3. Vietnam Stock/ Bond Composite Index (formerly CBV Vietnam Stock/ Bond Composite Index)
4. Vietnam Asset Allocation Performance Indexes
5. Vietnam Real Estate Composite Index (formerly CBV Vietnam Real Estate Composite Index)
6. Vietnam Investor Confidence Index - the first index of Vietnam Investor Confidence.
7. VND Index, a measure of global strength of Vietnam Dong.
8. Vietnam Consumer Confidence Index, a measure of consumer confidence of Vietnam, which is defined as the degree of optimism on their activities of savings and spending.
9. Vietnam Monetary Condition Indexes

== Vietnam stock indices ==
1. VSI Composite: VSI Total, VSI LargeCap, VSI MidCap, VSI SmallCap, VSI 20, VSI 10 (formerly CBV Total, CBV LargeCap, CBV MidCap, CBV SmallCap, CBV 20, CBV 10)
2. VSI Industries: VSI Goods, VSI Materials, VSI Oil & Gas, VSI Services, VSI Health Care, VSI Utilities, VSI Financials, VSI Industrials, VSI Technology (formerly CBV Goods, CBV Materials, CBV Oil & Gas, CBV Services, CBV Health Care, CBV Utilities, CBV Financials, CBV Industrials, CBV Technology)
3. VSI Value: VSI LargeCap Value, VSI MidCap Value, VSI SmallCap Value (formerly CBV LargeCap Value, CBV MidCap Value, CBV SmallCap Value)
4. VSI Growth: VSI LargeCap Growth, VSI MidCap Growth, VSI SmallCap Growth formerly CBV LargeCap Growth, CBV MidCap Growth, CBV SmallCap Growth)

== See also ==
- Woori CBV Securities Corporation
- Vietnam Investor Confidence Index
- VND Index
- Vietnam Consumer Confidence Index
- CBV Index (and CBV Total and CBV-Total-Index)
