= Midcap =

Midcap may refer to:

- MidCap Advisors, LLC, an established boutique investment bank
- CBV MidCap, stock market index indicating 30 out of 60 stock prices of medium-size companies in Vietnam
- Dagmar Midcap (born 1969), media personality originally based in Vancouver, British Columbia
- Russell Midcap Index, stock index of US stocks

== See also ==
- Mid cap
