= Korea Land and Housing Corporation real estate scandal =

2021 real estate scandal in South Korea

Korea Land and Housing Corporation real estate scandal is a suspicion that some employees of Korea Land and Housing Corporation (LH) have speculatively purchased land worth 10 billion won in Gwangmyeong and Siheung. The land is in the new towns' business areas, per the Moon Jae-in government's third New Town plan.

== Background ==
On February 24, 2021, the government additionally selected Gwangmyeong and Siheung as the third New Town plan cities to expand the supply of housing in the metropolitan area. It is the sixth new city to be announced in 2020, after Wangsuk, Hanam Gyosan, Changneung, Bucheon Daejang, and Gyeyang, Incheon. The new towns include Gyeyang New Town, Gyosan New Town, Daejang New Town, Wangsuk New Town, Changneung New Town, and Gwangmyeong Siheung New Town.

== Reasons ==
There is a practice of unilateral government decision-making and secrecy in which only a small number of people are aware of this information. Once a business plan is established, it is carried out unilaterally with little disruption. Therefore, if internal information can be found, it becomes very valuable information.

One of the causes is the strong motivation for crime. Once committed, a huge amount of unearned income can be achieved.

The Korea Land and Housing Corporation's internal surveillance system has not worked for a long time. LH's internal surveillance system was sloppy and its code of ethics was nominal. Over the past decade, there have been no internal audit results and no relevant disciplinary action has been found.

== Controversy ==
Since LH is an agency that executes new city projects, suspicions have been raised that they have violated the obligation to prevent conflicts of interest under the Public Officials Ethics Act and the prohibition of business secrets under the Anti-Corruption Act by using inside information. Controversy has been raised that a loophole has been opened in the Moon Jae-in administration's management of the new city development policy. On March 2, 2021, the Participation Solidarity and Minbyun raised the suspicion that the Moon Jae-in government had speculatively purchased 10 billion won (5.8 billion won loans) land in the Gwangmyeong New Town and Siheung New Town, the largest of the three new towns.

== Controversy areas ==
1. Gwangmyeong City SiHeung New Town
  - This is the area where this situation has occurred in earnest.
2. Changneung New Town, Wangsuk New Town
3. Gwacheon New Town
4. Daegu Yeonho District, Gimhae, Pangyo, etc., Gyeongsan Daeim District

== Modus operandi ==
LH employees have bought land in Mujinae-dong, Siheung-si, Gyeonggi-do, which was announced as a new city in Gwangmyeong and Siheung-si, Gyeonggi-do in 2017. After that, they planted Salix matsudana there. Although it is appropriate to plant one tree per 3.3 square meters, they planted dozens of trees. In land acceptance, the tree compensation fee is determined mainly by multiplying the transplant cost per tree by the total number of trees. The more you plant, the more compensation costs you will get. You can also evaluate the price of a tree, but the faster it grows, the higher the emotional price. Salix matsudana is considered to be the fastest-growing numbers when they are young.

According to data submitted by the Democratic Party of Korea's private jet office from Siheung and Gwangmyeong in Gyeonggi Province on March 8, 2021, LH employees were found to have submitted an agricultural management plan containing false information to local governments. LH employees filled out rice, sweet potatoes, and corn in the crop column, but in reality, they planted seedlings, such as Salix matsudana, which are easy to plant and are advantageous to be compensated for because they don't have to be managed. "Planting seedlings is a method that people who purchase farmland for speculative purposes often use to compensate for the costs of moving and planting," said a land appraisal company.

In addition, they invested in an area of about 4000m^{2} by splitting their shares with 4 people, but it seems to be to receive the maximum compensation by using the fact that the standard for compensation for large soil is 1,000m^{2} or more. According to a later report, it was also revealed that if it is over 1000m^{2}, they can get an apartment as compensation.

It turned out that all the buyers of land in Guarim-dong, Siheung City, where the suspicion was raised for the first time, received loans from one of the North Siheung Nonghyup Guarim Branch. It was found that some employees used loans up to the maximum limit of LTV, and in the process, they made a false agricultural plan and became a member of the Nonghyup by becoming a farmer. In this way, the money they borrowed from the North Siheung Nonghyup amounted to 5.8 billion won, and the North Siheung Nonghyup admitted that they approved the loan even though they knew that they were LH employees.

== Reaction ==
LH speculation has maximized antipathy toward the government's ruling party. The Moon Jae-in government's and the ruling party's approval ratings reached all-time lows.

Four polling institutions, including Embrain, K-Tat, Korea Research, and Hangook Research, conducted a National Index Survey (NBS) of 1,009 men and women aged 18 or older across the country from the 15th to the 17th. Regarding the alleged LH speculation, 73% of the respondents said they did not trust the results of the government-Cheong Wa Dae investigation, and 74% said it was difficult to properly investigate the LH investigation.

== Follow up ==
=== LH ===
LH said it has taken personnel measures to exclude 12 of the 14 suspected employees from their duties, excluding two former employees, and has also launched its full investigation. However, LH added that it is not the nature of disciplinary action as the charges have not been confirmed. Many of these employees are known to be affiliated with the headquarters of Seoul and Gyeonggi Province and are in charge of compensation.

LH also announced measures to prevent a recurrence in an apology. In cooperation with the government, the government will conduct a full investigation into the status of land transactions of related department employees and families for the entire third new city, and take stern measures by laws and regulations if any illegality is confirmed. LH then stressed that LH would introduce a pre-report system for land transactions for all employees and their families and investigate whether they owned land or not when pushing for new projects. If a land transaction that has not been reported or illegal is confirmed, an intensive penalty such as personnel disadvantages will be imposed.

=== Government ===
On March 28, 2021, the government decided to push for the mandatory registration of property for all public officials, including ninth-grade civil servants.

=== National Assembly ===
The "LH 5 Act" aimed at preventing speculation was passed by the National Assembly. The LH 5 Act includes amendments to the Public Officials Ethics Act, amendments to the Special Public Housing Act, amendments to the Korean Land and Housing Corporation Act, the Real Estate Transaction Act, and the Conflict of Interest Prevention Act.

== See also ==
- Korea Land and Housing Corporation
