= Woori =

Woori may refer to:

- Woori Bank (Hangul: 우리은행 Uri Eunhaeng, SWIFT HVBKKRSE, numeric 020), bank headquartered in Seoul, South Korea
- Woori CBV Securities Corporation (formerly known as Bien Viet Securities), Vietnam provider of financial and investment services
- Woori Financial Group, Seoul-based banking and financial services holdings company and is the largest bank in South Korea
- Woori Heroes or Nexen Heroes (Hangul: 넥센 히어로즈 야구단) are a South Korean professional baseball team based in Seoul
- Woori Yallock, town in Victoria, Australia

== See also ==
- Woolrich
