= James Coburn =

American actor (1928–2002)

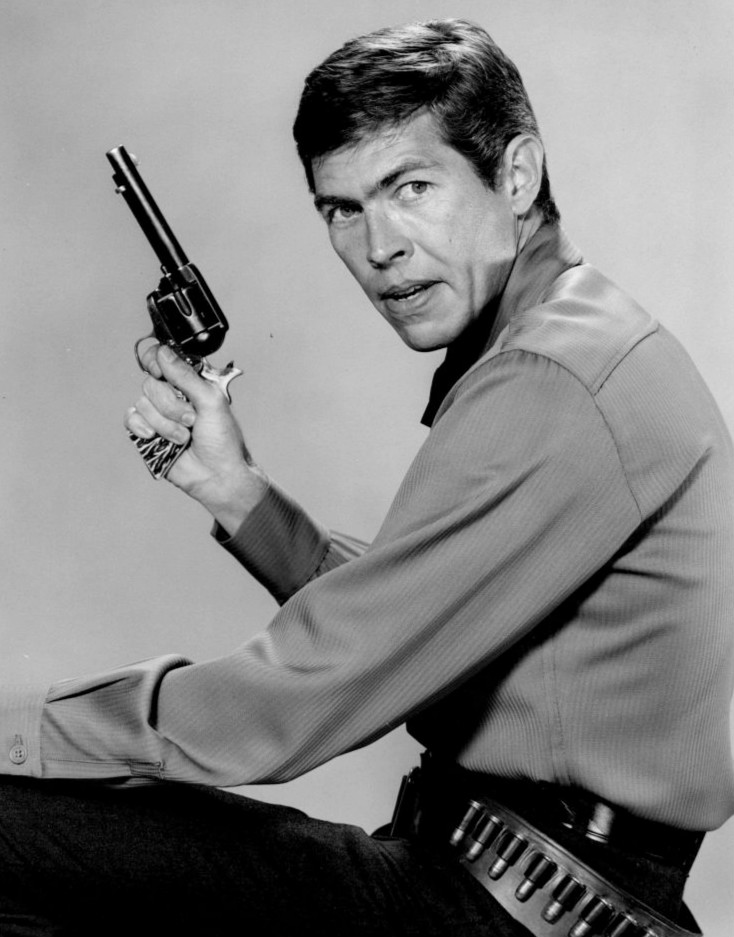
- Coburn as Anthony Wayne in The Californians (1959)
- Born: James Harrison Coburn III; August 31, 1928; Laurel, Nebraska, U.S.
- Died: November 18, 2002 (aged 74); Beverly Hills, California, U.S.
- Resting place: Pierce Brothers Westwood Village Memorial Park and Mortuary
- Education: Los Angeles City College
- Occupation: Actor
- Years active: 1953–2002
- Spouses: Beverly Kelly (m. 1959; div. 1979) Paula Murad (m. 1993)
- Children: 2
- Awards: Academy Award for Best Supporting Actor – Affliction (1997)

James Harrison Coburn III (August 31, 1928 – November 18, 2002) was an American actor who featured in more than 70 films, largely action roles, and made 100 television appearances during a 45-year career.

Coburn was in numerous leading roles in Westerns and action films. He had starring roles in The Magnificent Seven, Hell Is for Heroes, The Great Escape, Charade and Hard Times as well as the lead role in Our Man Flint and its sequel In Like Flint, The President's Analyst, Duck, You Sucker!, Pat Garrett and Billy the Kid, and Cross of Iron. In 1998, Coburn won an Academy Award for his supporting role as Glen Whitehouse in Affliction. In 2002, he received a Primetime Emmy Award for Outstanding Miniseries nomination for producing The Mists of Avalon.

During the New Hollywood era, he cultivated an image synonymous with "cool".

== Early life ==
James Harrison Coburn III was born in Laurel, Nebraska, on August 31, 1928, the son of James Harrison Coburn II (1902–1975) and Mylet S. Coburn (née Johnson; 1900–1984). His father and namesake was of Scots-Irish ancestry and his mother was of Swedish ancestry. Her parents emigrated from Sweden. James' father had a garage business in Laurel that was destroyed by the Great Depression. Coburn was raised in Compton, California, where he attended Compton Junior College.

In 1950, Coburn was drafted into the U.S. Army, where he served as a truck driver and occasionally a disc jockey on an Army radio station in Texas. He also narrated Army training films in Mainz, West Germany.

He attended Los Angeles City College, where he studied acting with fellow actor Jeff Corey under Stella Adler's tutelage, and later made his stage debut at the La Jolla Playhouse in Herman Melville's Billy Budd.

== Career ==
=== Early television work ===
Coburn's first television appearance was in 1953 on Four Star Playhouse.

He was selected for a Remington Products razor commercial, where he was able to shave off 11 days of beard growth in less than 60 seconds while joking that he had more teeth to show on camera than the other 12 candidates for the part.

Coburn's film debut came in 1959 as the sidekick of Pernell Roberts in the Randolph Scott Western Ride Lonesome. He soon got a job in another Western, Face of a Fugitive (1959). Filmink argued "he made a terrific cowboy and was thus easily castable in the scores of Westerns being made for American TV at the time; indeed, Coburn guest starred in pretty much all of them." These included several episodes of NBC's Bonanza and appearing twice each on three other NBC Westerns: Laramie with Robert Fuller,Tales of Wells Fargo with Dale Robertson, one episode in the role of Butch Cassidy; and The Restless Gun with John Payne in "The Pawn" and "The Way Back", the latter segment alongside Bonanza's Dan Blocker. "Butch Cassidy" aired in 1958. He played a rustler in The Rifleman - Season 1, Episode 13 - The Young Englishman.

Coburn's third film was a major breakthrough for him, as the knife-wielding Britt in The Magnificent Seven (1960), directed by John Sturges for the Mirisch Company. Coburn was hired on the recommendation of his friend Robert Vaughn. During the 1960–61 season, Coburn co-starred with Ralph Taeger and Joi Lansing in the NBC adventure/drama series Klondike, set in the Alaskan gold rush town of Skagway. When Klondike was cancelled, Taeger and Coburn were regrouped as detectives in Mexico in NBC's equally short-lived Acapulco.

Coburn also made two guest appearances on CBS's Perry Mason, both times as the murder victim, in "The Case of the Envious Editor" and "The Case of the Angry Astronaut". In 1962, he portrayed Col. Briscoe in the "Hostage Child" of CBS's Rawhide.

=== Supporting actor in films ===
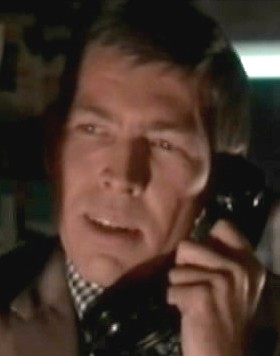
Coburn in Charade (1963)

Coburn had a good role in Hell Is for Heroes (1962), a war film with Steve McQueen. He followed it with another war film with McQueen, The Great Escape (1963), directed by Sturges for the Mirisches, where Coburn played an Australian POW. For the Mirisches, Coburn narrated Kings of the Sun (1963).

Coburn was one of the villains in Charade (1963), starring Cary Grant and Audrey Hepburn. He followed that role playing a glib naval officer in Paddy Chayefsky's The Americanization of Emily, replacing James Garner, who had moved up to the lead role when William Holden withdrew from the production. As a result, Coburn was signed to a seven-year contract with 20th Century Fox.

Coburn had another excellent supporting role as a one-armed Indian tracker in Major Dundee (1965), directed by Sam Peckinpah and starring Charlton Heston.

At Fox, he was second-billed in the pirate film A High Wind in Jamaica (1965), supporting Anthony Quinn in the lead role. He had a cameo in the black comedy The Loved One (1965).

=== Stardom ===
In December 1964 it was announced Coburn would star in Fox's James Bond parody film Our Man Flint (1966), playing super agent Derek Flint. Producer Saul David commented, Coburn "is undoubtedly one of the most interesting looking actors in the business today. I would describe him as a cross between Humphrey Bogart and Jean Paul Belmondo - a true descendant of that bygone generation of character actors who became leading men by accident... Coburn has a fantastic effect on women filmgoers and I think it's because ladies go more for masculinity and charm than prettiness in a male star."" The movie was a big success at the box office on its release in 1966 and established Coburn as a star.

Coburn followed it with What Did You Do in the War, Daddy? (1966), a wartime comedy from Blake Edwards, which was made for the Mirisches; Coburn was top billed although the lead was Dick Shawn. It was a commercial disappointment. Dead Heat on a Merry-Go-Round (1966) was a crime movie made at Columbia.

Back at Fox, Coburn made a second Flint film, In Like Flint (1967), which was popular, but Coburn did not wish to make any more movies in that series. This has been called a "mistake" by Coburn as films in which he starred in where he did not play Flint were not as successful. He went over to Paramount for a Western comedy made through Edwards' company, Waterhole No. 3 (1967) and the political satire The President's Analyst (1967). Neither performed particularly well commercially, but over the years, The President's Analyst has become a cult film. In 1967, Coburn was voted the 12th-biggest star in Hollywood.

Over at Columbia, Coburn was in a Swinging '60s heist film, Duffy (1968), which flopped. He was one of several stars who had cameos in Candy (1968), then played a hitman in Hard Contract (1969) for Fox, another flop.

Coburn tried a change of pace, an adaptation of a Tennessee Williams play, Last of the Mobile Hot Shots (1970) directed by Sidney Lumet, but the film was not popular. In July 1970, Richard F Zanuck of Fox dropped the $300,000 option it had with Coburn.

In 1971, Coburn starred in the Zapata Western Duck, You Sucker!, with Rod Steiger and directed by Sergio Leone, as an Irish explosives expert and revolutionary who has fled to Mexico during the time of the Mexican Revolution in the early 20th century. In 1964, Coburn had said he would do A Fistful of Dollars if they paid him $25,000, which was too expensive for the production's tiny budget. Duck You Sucker, also called A Fistful of Dynamite, was not as highly regarded as Leone's four previous Westerns, but was hugely popular in Europe, especially France.

Back in the US, Coburn made another film with Blake Edwards, the thriller The Carey Treatment (1972). It was badly cut by MGM and was commercially unsuccessful. So, too, was The Honkers (1972), where Coburn played a rodeo rider.

Coburn went back to Italy to make another Western, A Reason to Live, a Reason to Die (1973), or Massacre at Fort Holman. He then reteamed with director Sam Peckinpah for the 1973 film Pat Garrett and Billy the Kid, playing Pat Garrett. In 1973, he was voted the 23rd-most popular star in Hollywood.

In 1973, Coburn was among the featured celebrities dressed in prison gear on the cover of the album Band on the Run made by Paul McCartney and his band Wings.

Coburn was one of the pallbearers at the funeral of Bruce Lee along with Steve McQueen, Bruce's brother, Robert Lee, Peter Chin, Danny Inosanto, and Taky Kimura. Coburn gave a speech: "Farewell, Brother. It has been an honor to share this space in time with you. As a friend and a teacher, you have given to me, have brought my physical, spiritual, and psychological selves together. Thank you. May peace be with you."

Coburn was one of several stars in the popular The Last of Sheila (1973). He then starred in a series of thrillers: Harry in Your Pocket (1974), the debut feature from Mission Impossible creator Bruce Geller, and The Internecine Project (1975). Neither was widely seen.

=== Mid-career ===
Coburn began to drop back down the credit list: he was third billed in writer-director Richard Brooks' film Bite the Bullet (1975) behind Gene Hackman and Candice Bergen. He co-starred with Charles Bronson in Hard Times (1975), the directorial debut of Walter Hill. The movie was popular.

Coburn played the lead in the action film Sky Riders (1976), then played Charlton Heston's antagonist in The Last Hard Men (1976). He narrated the official documentary film of the 1976 Innsbruck Winter Olympics, White Rock. He was one of the many stars in Midway (1976), then had the star role in Sam Peckinpah's Cross of Iron (1977) playing a German soldier. He finished directing the film because of Peckinpah's constant drunkenness. This critically acclaimed war epic performed poorly in the United States, but was a huge hit in Europe. Peckinpah and Coburn remained close friends until Peckinpah's death in 1984.

Coburn returned to television in 1978 to star in a three-part miniseries version of a Dashiell Hammett detective novel, The Dain Curse, tailoring his character to bear a physical resemblance to the author. During the previous year as a spokesman for the Joseph Schlitz Brewing Company, he was paid $500,000 to promote its new product in television advertisements by saying only two words: "Schlitz Light." In Japan, his masculine appearance was so appealing, he became an icon for its leading cigarette brand. He also supported himself in later years by exporting rare automobiles to Japan. He was deeply interested in Zen and Tibetan Buddhism, and collected sacred Buddhist artwork. He narrated a film about the 16th Karmapa called The Lion's Roar.

Coburn starred in Firepower (1979) with Sophia Loren, replacing Charles Bronson when the latter pulled out. He had a cameo in The Muppet Movie (1979) and had leading roles in Goldengirl (1980) and The Baltimore Bullet (1980). He was Shirley MacLaine's husband in Loving Couples (1980) and had the lead in a Canadian film, Crossover (1980).

=== Later years ===
In 1981, Coburn moved almost entirely into supporting roles, such as those of the villains in both High Risk (1981) and Looker (1981). He hosted a TV series of the horror-anthology type, Darkroom, in 1981 and 1982. According to Mr. T, Coburn was slated to play the Hannibal character on the hit television series The A-Team, but NBC changed their mind and went with George Peppard. He supported Walter Mondale's campaign in the 1984 presidential election. Coburn also portrayed Dwight Owen Barnes in the PC video game C.E.O., developed by Artdink as a spin-off of its A-Train series.

Because of his severe rheumatoid arthritis, Coburn appeared in very few films during the 1980s, despite continuing to work during his final years. This disease had left Coburn's body deformed and in pain. He told ABC News in a 1999 interview: "You start to turn to stone. See, my hand is twisted now because tendons have shortened." For 20 years, Coburn tried a host of both conventional and unconventional treatments, but none of them worked. "There was so much pain that...every time I stood up, I would break into a sweat," he recalled. Then, in 1996, Coburn tried methylsulfonylmethane (MSM), a sulfur compound available at most health food stores. The result, he said, was nothing short of miraculous. "You take this stuff and it starts right away," said Coburn. "Everyone I've given it to has had a positive response." Though the MSM did not cure Coburn's arthritis, it did relieve his pain, allowing him to move more freely and resume his career.

Coburn was in a four-year relationship with British singer-songwriter Lynsey de Paul from the late 1970s. They co-wrote her songs "Losin' the Blues for You" and "Melancholy Melon" that appeared on her album Tigers and Fireflies. Coburn resumed his film career in the 1990s, where he appeared in supporting roles in Young Guns II, Hudson Hawk, Sister Act 2: Back in the Habit, Maverick, Eraser, The Nutty Professor, Affliction, and Payback. His performance as Glen Whitehouse in Affliction earned him an Academy Award for Best Supporting Actor. One of his final roles was in the Pixar animated film Monsters, Inc. as the voice of Henry J. Waternoose III.

== Cars ==
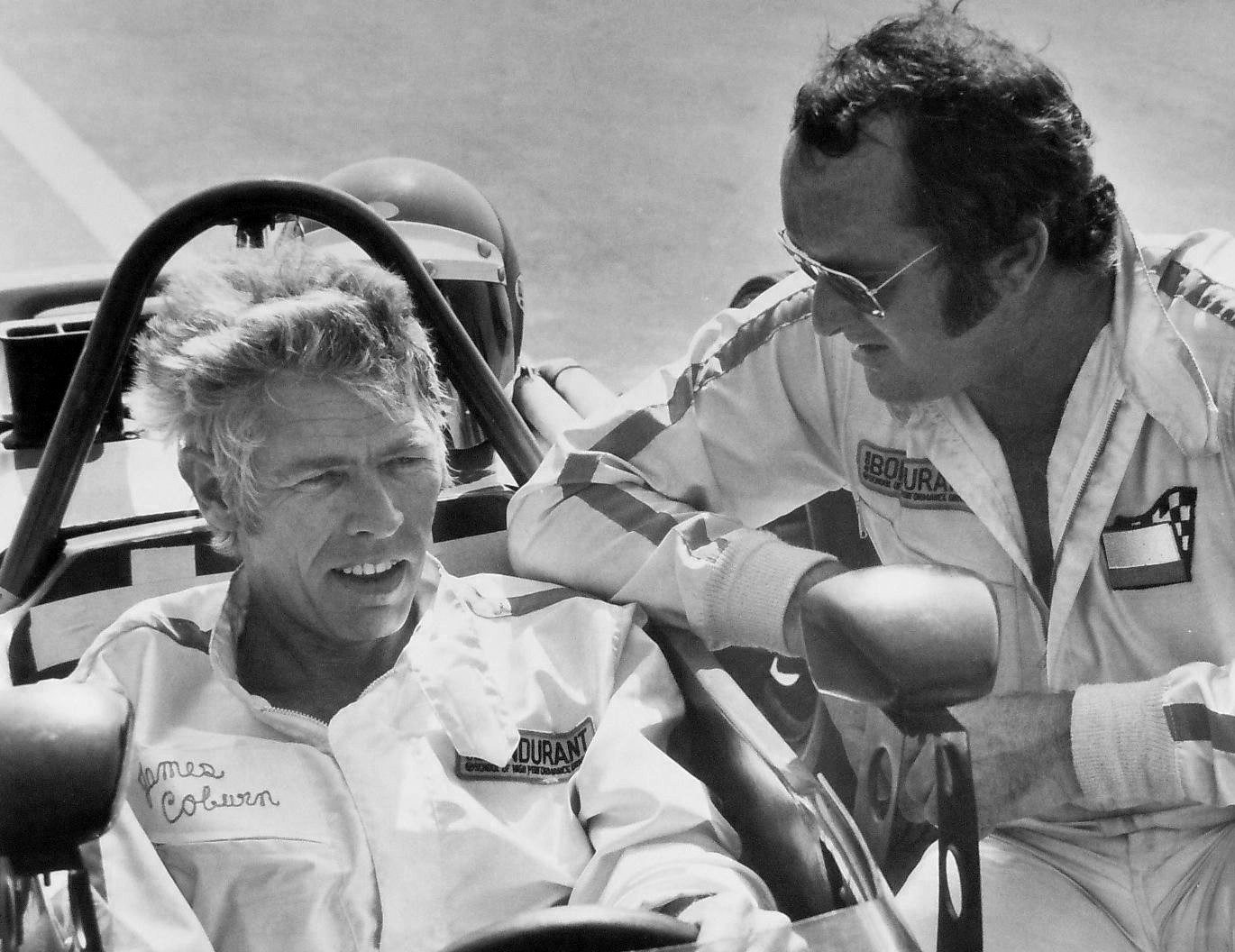
Bob Bondurant teaching Coburn in 1972

Coburn's interest in fast cars began with his father's garage business and continued throughout his life, as he exported rare cars to Japan. Coburn was credited with having introduced Steve McQueen to Ferraris, and in the early 1960s, owned a Ferrari 250 GT Lusso and a Ferrari 250 GT Spyder California SWB. His Spyder was the 13th of just 56 built. Coburn imported the used car in 1964, shortly after completing The Great Escape.

Cal Spyder #2377 was repainted several times during Coburn's ownership; it has been black, silver, and possibly red. He kept the car at his Beverly Hills-area home, where it was often serviced by Max Balchowsky, who also worked on the suspension and frame modifications on the Mustang GTs used in the filming of McQueen's Bullitt. Coburn sold the Spyder in 1987 after 24 years of ownership. The car was restored, had several owners, and was sold in 2008 for $10,894,400 to English broadcaster Chris Evans. At that time, it set a new world record for the highest price ever paid for an automobile at auction.

Over time, he also owned a Ferrari Daytona, at least one Ferrari 308, and a 1967 Ferrari 412P sports racer. Coburn also did the voiceovers for Chevrolet's Like a Rock commercials from 1998 until his death in 2002.

== Personal life ==
Coburn was married twice: first to Beverly Kelly, with whom he had two children, for 20 years from 1959 to 1979.

He later married actress Paula Murad on October 22, 1993, in Versailles, France; they remained married until Coburn's death in 2002. The couple set up a charitable organization, the James and Paula Coburn Foundation.

In spite of his severe rheumatoid arthritis, Coburn was a martial arts student and a friend of fellow actor Bruce Lee; upon Lee's early death, Coburn was one of his pallbearers at his funeral on July 25, 1973.

== Death ==
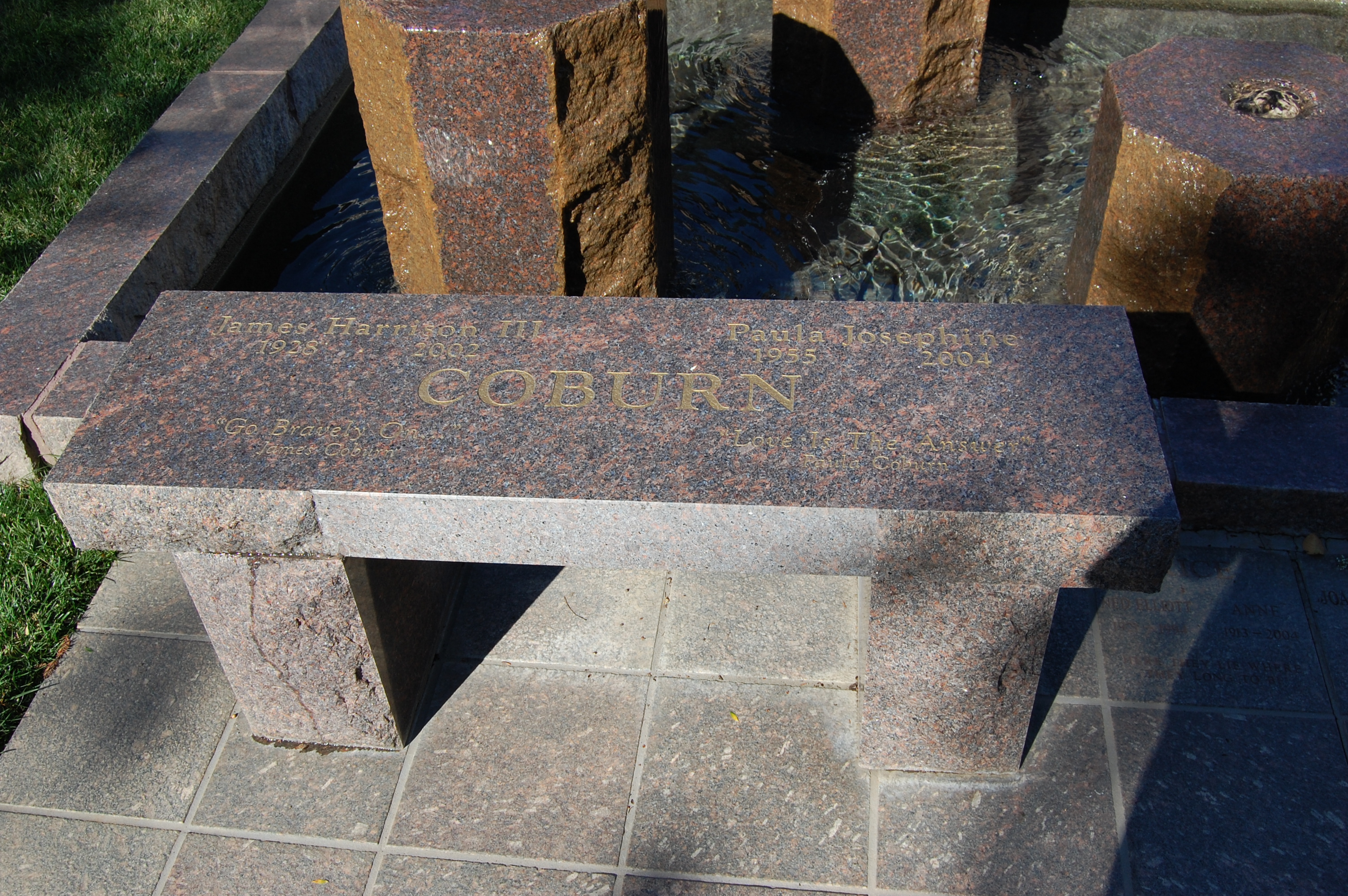
Coburn's grave marker at Pierce Brothers Westwood Village Memorial Park and Mortuary in Westwood, Los Angeles

Coburn died from a heart attack at his home in Beverly Hills on November 18, 2002, at the age of 74. His wife, Paula, said that he died in her arms when they were listening to music together. He was rushed to Cedars-Sinai Medical Center where he was pronounced dead. Paula Coburn died from cancer less than two years later, on July 30, 2004, at the age of 48.

== Critical analysis ==
In The New Biographical Dictionary of Film, critic David Thomson states that "Coburn is a modern rarity: an actor who projects lazy, humorous sexuality. He has made a variety of flawed, pleasurable films, the merits of which invariably depend on his laconic presence. Increasingly, he was the best thing in his movies, smiling privately, seeming to suggest that he was in contact with some profound source of amusement". Film critic Pauline Kael remarked on Coburn's unusual characteristics, stating that "he looked like the child of the liaison between Lt. Pinkerton and Madame Butterfly". George Hickenlooper, who directed Coburn in The Man from Elysian Fields called him "the masculine male". Andy García called him "the personification of class, the hippest of the hip", and Paul Schrader noted "he was of that 50s generation. He had that part hipster, part cool-cat aura about him. He was one of those kind of men who were formed by the Rat Pack kind of style."

== Filmography ==
=== Film ===
Year	Title	Role	Notes
1959	Ride Lonesome	Whit	
1959	Face of a Fugitive	Purdy	
1960	The Magnificent Seven	Britt	
1962	Hell Is for Heroes	Corporal Frank Henshaw	
1963	The Great Escape	Flying Officer Louis Sedgwick, "The Manufacturer"	
1963	Charade	Tex Panthollow	
1963	Kings of the Sun	Narrator	Uncredited
1963	The Man from Galveston	Boyd Palmer	Television pilot of Temple Houston
1964	The Americanization of Emily	Lieutenant Commander Paul "Bus" Cummings	
1965	Major Dundee	Samuel Potts	
1965	A High Wind in Jamaica	Zac	
1965	The Loved One	Immigration Officer	
1966	Our Man Flint	Derek Flint	
1966	What Did You Do in the War, Daddy?	Lieutenant Christian	
1966	Dead Heat on a Merry-Go-Round	Eli Kotch	
1967	In Like Flint	Derek Flint	
1967	Waterhole No. 3	Lewton Cole	
1967	The President's Analyst	Dr. Sidney Schaefer	Also producer
1968	Duffy	Duffy	
1968	Candy	Dr. A.B. Krankheit	
1969	Hard Contract	John Cunningham	
1970	Last of the Mobile Hot Shots	Jeb Thornton	
1971	Duck, You Sucker!	John H. Mallory	Renamed A Fistful of Dynamite for U.S. release
1972	The Carey Treatment	Dr. Peter Carey	
1972	The Honkers	Lew Lathrop	
1972	A Reason to Live, a Reason to Die	Colonel Pembroke	Renamed Massacre at Fort Holman for U.S. release
1973	Pat Garrett and Billy the Kid	Pat Garrett	
1973	The Last of Sheila	Clinton Green	
1973	Harry in Your Pocket	Harry	
1974	The Internecine Project	Robert Elliot	
1975	Bite the Bullet	Luke Matthews	
1975	Hard Times	Speed	
1975	Jackpot		Unfinished film
1976	Sky Riders	Jim McCabe	
1976	The Last Hard Men	Zach Provo	
1976	Midway	Captain Vinton Maddox	
1977	White Rock	Narrator	
1977	Cross of Iron	Sergeant Rolf Steiner	
1978	California Suite	Pilot in Diana Barrie's Film on Airplane	Uncredited
1979	Firepower	Fanon	
1979	The Muppet Movie	El Sleezo Cafe Owner	Cameo
1979	Goldengirl	Jack Dryden	
1980	The Baltimore Bullet	Nick Casey	
1980	Loving Couples	Dr. Walter Kirby	
1980	Mr. Patman	Patman	
1981	High Risk	Serrano	
1981	Looker	John Reston	
1985	Martin's Day	Lieutenant Lardner	
1986	Death of a Soldier	Major Patrick Dannenberg	
1989	Train to Heaven	Gregorius	
1989	Call from Space		Short
1990	Young Guns II	John Simpson Chisum	
1991	Hudson Hawk	George Kaplan	
1993	The Hit List	Peter Mayhew	
1993	Deadfall	Mike / Lou Donan	
1993	Sister Act 2: Back in the Habit	Mr. Crisp	
1994	Maverick	Commodore Duvall	
1995	The Set-Up	Jeremiah Cole	
1996	The Disappearance of Kevin Johnson	Himself	
1996	Eraser	WitSec Chief Arthur Beller	
1996	The Nutty Professor	Harlan Hartley	
1997	Keys to Tulsa	Harmon Shaw	
1997	Affliction	Glen Whitehouse	Academy Award for Best Supporting Actor; Nominated—Independent Spirit Award for Best Supporting Male; Nominated—Screen Actors Guild Award for Outstanding Performance by a Male Actor in a Supporting Role
1999	Payback	Justin Fairfax	
2000	Intrepid	Captain Hal Josephson	
2000	The Good Doctor	Dr. Samuel Roberts	Short
2001	Proximity	Jim Corcoran	
2001	Texas Rangers	Narrator	
2001	The Yellow Bird	Reverend Increase Tutwiler	Short
2001	The Man from Elysian Fields	Tobias Alcott	
2001	Monsters, Inc.	Henry J. Waternoose III	Voice
2002	Snow Dogs	James "Thunder Jack" Johnson	
2002	American Gun	Martin Tillman	Final film role

=== Television ===
Year	Title	Role	Notes
1953	Four Star Playhouse	Sailor	Episode: "The Last Voyage"
1957	Studio One in Hollywood	Pete / Sam Chandler	2 episodes
1958	Suspicion	Matt Carson	Episode: "Voice in the Night"
1958	General Electric Theater	Claude Firman	Episode: "Ah There, Beau Brummel"
1958	Wagon Train	Ike Daggett	Episode: "The Millie Davis Story"
1958–1959	The Restless Gun	Tom Quinn / Vestry	2 episodes
1958–1959	Walt Disney's Wonderful World of Color	Mexican Police Captain (Uncredited) / Jack - Outlaw Leader	3 episodes
1958–1959	Alfred Hitchcock Presents	Andrews / Union Sergeant	2 episodes
1958–1961	The Rifleman	Cy Parker / Ambrose	2 episodes
1958–1962	Tales of Wells Fargo	Idaho / Ben Crider	2 episodes
1959	Trackdown	Joker Wells	Episode: "Hard Lines"
1959	State Trooper	Dobie	Episode: "Hard Money, Soft Touch"
1959	Black Saddle	Niles	Episode: "Client: Steele"
1959	M Squad	Harry Blacker	Episode: "The Fire Makers"
1959	The Rough Riders	Judson	Episode: "Deadfall"
1959	The Californians	Deputy Anthony Wayne	2 episodes
1959	Johnny Ringo	Moss Taylor	Episode: "The Arrival"
1959	Whirlybirds	Steve Alexander	Episode: "Mr. Jinx"
1959	Tombstone Territory	Chuck Ashley	Episode: "To the Last Man"
1959	The Life and Legend of Wyatt Earp	Buckskin Frank Leslie	Episode: "The Noble Outlaws"
1959	The DuPont Show with June Allyson	Floyd	Episode: "The Girl"
1959	The Millionaire	Lew Bennett	Episode: "Millionaire Timothy Mackail"
1959–1960	Bronco	Adam Coverly / Jesse James	2 episodes
1959–1960	Wichita Town	Fletcher / Wally	2 episodes
1959–1960	Bat Masterson	Poke Otis / Leo Talley	2 episodes
1959–1960	Have Gun – Will Travel	Jack Harvey / Bill Sledge	2 episodes
1959–1960	Wanted: Dead or Alive	Henry Turner / Jesse Holloway / Howard Catlett	3 episodes
1959–1960	Dick Powell's Zane Grey Theatre	Jess Newton / Charlie Doyle	2 episodes
1959–1961	Laramie	Finch / Gil Spanner	2 episodes
1959–1966	Bonanza	Pete Jessup / Ross Marquette / Elmer Trace / Heckler	4 episodes
1960	The Texan	Cal Gruder	Episode: "Friend of the Family"
1960	Sugarfoot	Rome Morgan	Episode: "Blackwater Swamp"
1960	Men into Space	Dr. Narry	Episode: "Contraband"
1960	Bourbon Street Beat	Buzz Griffin	Episode: "Target of Hate"
1960	Peter Gunn	Bud Bailey	Episode: "The Murder Clause"
1960	The Deputy	Coffer	Episode: "The Truly Yours"
1960	Tate	Jory	Episode: "Home Town"
1960	The Alaskans	Bob Howard	Episode: "The Ballad of Whitehorse"
1960	Richard Diamond, Private Detective	Victor Tavo	Episode: "Coat of Arms"
1960	Death Valley Days	Steve Barnes	Episode: "Pamela's Oxen"
1960	Lawman	Blake Carr / Lank Bailey	2 episodes
1960–1961	Klondike	Jefferson "Jeff" Durain	10 episodes
1961	The Aquanauts	Joe Casey	Episode: "River Gold"
1961	The Detectives	Duke Hawkins	Episode: "The Frightened Ones"
1961	Stagecoach West	Sam Murdock	Episode: "Come Home Again"
1961	The Tall Man	John Miller	Episode: "The Best Policy"
1961	The Untouchables	Dennis Garrity	Episode: "The Jamaica Ginger Story"
1961	Outlaws	Culley Scott	Episode: "Culley"
1961	Acapulco	Gregg Miles	8 episodes
1961	The Brothers Brannagan	Dell	Episode: "Death Is Not Deductible"
1961	Cheyenne	Kell	Episode: "Trouble Street"
1961	The Murder Men	Arthur Troy	Television film
1961–1962	Perry Mason	Donald Fletcher / General Addison Brand	2 episodes
1962	Cain's Hundred	Arthur Troy	Episode: "Blues for a Junkman: Arthur Troy"
1962	Rawhide	Colonel Briscoe	Episode: "Hostage Child"
1962	Checkmate	Gresch	Episode: "A Chant of Silence"
1962	The Dick Powell Show	Charlie Allnut	Episode: "The Safari" (television pilot for a series based on The African Queen)
1962	Naked City	Harry Brind	Episode: "Goodbye Mama, Hello Auntie Maud"
1962	Ripcord	Bert Tucker	Episode: "Double Drop"
1962	King of Diamonds	Dekker	Episode: "Backlash"
1963	Stoney Burke	Dr. Henry Jamison	Episode: "The Test"
1963	Combat!	Corporal Arnold Kanger	Episode: "Masquerade"
1963	The Greatest Show on Earth	Kelly	Episode: "Uncaged"
1963	The Eleventh Hour	Steve Kowlowski	Episode: "Oh, You Shouldn't Have Done It"
1963	The Twilight Zone	Major French	Episode: "The Old Man in the Cave"
1964	Route 66	Hamar Neilsen	Episode: "Kiss the Monster - Make Him Sleep"
1964	The Defenders	Earl Chafee	Episode: "The Man Who Saved His Country"
1977	The Rockford Files	Director	Episode: "Irving the Explainer"
1978	The Dain Curse	Hamilton Nash	TV Mini-Series
1979	This Is Your Life		Filmed Tribute
1980	Escape	Narrator	
1980	The Muppet Show	Himself	Guest appearance
1981	Darkroom	Host	Series
1981	Valley of the Dolls	Henry Bellamy	TV Mini-Series
1981	The Fall Guy	Himself	Episode: "Pilot"
1982	Saturday Night Live	Himself	Episode: "James Coburn/Lindsey Buckingham"
1983	Malibu	Tom Wharton	Television film
1983	Digital Dreams	God's Gift to Wyman	Television film
1984	Draw!	Sam Starret	Television film
1984	Faerie Tale Theatre	The Gypsy	Episode: "Pinocchio"
1985	Sins of the Father	Frank Murchison	Television film
1986	The Wildest West Show of the Stars	Self / Grand Marshall	Television Special
1990–1992	Captain Planet and the Planeteers	Looten Plunder (voice)	14 episodes
1991	Silverfox	Robert Fox	Television film
1992	Crash Landing: The Rescue of Flight 232	Jim Hathaway	Television film
1992	True Facts		Television film
1992	The Fifth Corner	Dr. Grandwell	2 episodes
1992	Murder, She Wrote	Cyrus Ramsey	Episode: "Day of the Dead"
1992	Mastergate	Major Manley Battle	Television film
1993	The Wild West	(Voice)	TV Mini-Series
1994	Ray Alexander: A Taste for Justice	Jeffrey Winslow	Television film
1994	Greyhounds	John Dolan	Television film
1994	A Christmas Reunion	Santa	Television film
1995	The Avenging Angel	Porter Rockwell	Television film
1995	Ray Alexander: A Menu for Murder	Jeffrey Winslow	Television film
1995	Picket Fences	Walter Brock	Episode: "Upbringings"
1996	The Cherokee Kid	Cyrus B. Bloomington	Television film
1996	Football America	Self / Narrator	Television film
1996	Okavango: Africa's Savage Oasis	Self / Narrator	Television film
1997	Profiler	Charles Vanderhorn	2 episodes
1997	The Second Civil War	Jack Buchan	Television film
1997	Skeletons	Frank Jove	Television film
1998	Mr. Murder	Drew Oslett, Sr.	TV Mini-Series
1998	Stories from My Childhood	The Archbishop (voice)	Episode: "The Wild Swans"
1999	Vengeance Unlimited	Boone Paladin (voice)	Uncredited; Episode: "Judgment"
1999	Noah's Ark	The Peddler	TV Mini-Series
1999	Shake, Rattle and Roll: An American Love Story	Morris Gunn	TV Mini-Series
2000	Missing Pieces	Atticus Cody	Television film
2000	Scene by Scene	Himself	Season 1, Episode 12 "James Coburn"
2001	Walter and Henry	Charlie	Television film
2002	Arli$$	Slaughterhouse Sid Perelli	Episode: "The Immortal" (final appearance)

=== Video games ===
Year	Title	Role	Notes
1995	C.E.O.	Dwight Owen Barnes	
2001	Monsters, Inc.	Henry J. Waternoose III	
2001	Monsters, Inc. Scream Team	Henry J. Waternoose III	

== Further information ==
- Coburn, Robyn L (April 5, 2022). Dervish Dust: The Life and Words of James Coburn. Potomac Books, Inc. ISBN 978-1640124059 (Hardcover), ASIN B08ZJ8YS2D (Kindle)

== See also ==
- List of actors with Academy Award nominations
- List of oldest and youngest Academy Award winners and nominees—Oldest winners for Best Supporting Actor
