= CBV =

CBV may refer to:

- Chartered Business Valuator (CBV), a professional business valuation designation offered by the CBV Institute.
- Call by value evaluation
- Callback verification for e-mail
- Cannabivarin
- CBV, a chemotherapy regimen (the letters each denoting a different drug)
- CBV-FM, a radio station in Quebec affiliated with Première Chaîne
- Cerebral blood volume, which can be measured by FMRI and is closely linked to cerebral blood flow
- Chillon–Byron–Villeneuve tramway, a former tramway in the Swiss canton of Vaud
- Chứng khoán Biển Việt or Bien Viet Securities, an investment bank of Vietnam, is the world's largest provider of Vietnam's financial market indexes and economic indicators, such as CBV Index or CBV Total
- Confederação Brasileira de Voleibol, national governing body for volleyball in Brazil
- Coxsackie B virus
- CBV, a file extension used for ChessBase Archive files
- Compressor Bypass Valve, a type of Blowoff valve
