= Mr. Domino =

Mr. Domino may refer to:

- No One Can Stop Mr. Domino!, a video game
- Robin Paul Weijers or Mr. Domino, Dutch creator of Domino Day television events
