= Woori CBV Securities Corporation =

- Industry: Financial
- Founded: 2006
- Headquarters: Hanoi, Vietnam
- Products: Financial services
- Website: http://wooricbv.com

Woori CBV Securities Corporation (formerly known as Bien Viet Securities) is Vietnam provider of financial and investment services. Woori CBV has been well known as the first and largest provider of Vietnam’s financial market indexes and economic indicators. Vietnam Securities Indexes is the first equity index that composes all stocks listed on the two exchanges in Hanoi and Ho Chi Minh City. Vietnam Finance Indexes family is the first family of Vietnam finance indexes to be sponsored and introduced by Bloomberg to global financial institutions. The index system developed by Woori CBV is the world's largest index family for Vietnam with over 450 equity indexes, 50 fixed income indexes, and over 50 indexes in other categories. The company's most known indexes include Vietnam Securities Indexes, Vietnam Bond Indexes, Vietnam Investor Confidence Index, VND Index, Vietnam Consumer Confidence Index.

== Shareholder ==
Woori CBV Securities Corporation is a company of Woori Financial Group, Korea's largest bank and financial group.

== See also ==
- Vietnam Investor Confidence Index
- VND Index
- Vietnam Securities Indexes
- Vietnam Bond Indexes
- Woori Financial Group
- Woori Investment & Securities
- Bien Viet Securities
