= Aquanaut's Holiday: Hidden Memories =

2008 video game

- Developer: Artdink (Note: Additional work by Japan Studio)
- Publisher: Sony Computer Entertainment
- Series: Aquanaut's Holiday
- Platform: PlayStation 3
- Release: JP: September 25, 2008
- Genres: Adventure, simulation
- Mode: Single-player

Aquanaut's Holiday: Hidden Memories (Note: Japanese: AQUANAUT'S HOLIDAY ~隠された記録~, Hepburn: , Aquanaut's Holiday: Kakusareta Kiroku) is a 2008 adventure video game developed by Artdink and published by Sony Computer Entertainment for the PlayStation 3. A Japanese version was released in Japan and South East Asia on September 25, 2008. A translated English and Chinese version (Aquanaut's Holiday ~堡礁秘辛~) was released in Hong Kong, South Korea, Taiwan and South East Asia on November 20, 2008.

== History ==
Aquanaut's Holiday: Kakusareta Kiroku was previously known as Aqua which was the title used in the Tokyo Game Show 2007 official teaser.

This PlayStation 3 release is the latest installment in Artdink's Aquanaut's Holiday game series which started on the PlayStation in 1995.

== Gameplay ==
The actual story mode of the game can be compared to an adventure game. The main—unnamed—character is a journalist, in search of the missing oceanographer William "Bill" Graber. Using a submarine called the Dolphin no.2 the player explores the seas for clues.

The game takes place in Kisira Atoll, in Polynesia. An oceanographic research facility named Kisira Base is the starting point and where the player always comes back to, for supplies (such as batteries for sonar navigation buoys) and equipment.

Two scientists work at the base, the young and dreamy Jessica Porter and the conservative chief Robert Kemelman. Both assist the player in solving mysteries, each in their own way. Jessica likes to believe fairytales and legends, while Robert usually comes up with a scientific explanation.

All the fish, animals and other discoveries are added to a database. Some fish can communicate and the player has to repeat the sounds made by a fish, using the four trigger buttons of the Sixaxis controller.

At all times, the unlocked area of the map is free to explore as the player likes.

=== English version ===
The game is currently only available in Japan and South East Asia (Hong Kong, Taiwan and Singapore); however, the Asian version was re-released in November 2008 with Chinese and English languages replacing the original Japanese. Given the fairly simple gameplay, the English version is understandable for teens and older players, but young children may be confused by the significant 'Engrish' evident in the translation. The English-language version is also available in Korea.

== Reception ==
Aquanaut's Holiday: Hidden Memories entered the Japanese sales charts at number 9, selling 18,000 units. The game received a score of 32 out of 40 by Famitsu magazine.

== See also ==
- Afrika
