= Aquanaut's Holiday =

1995 adventure video game

- North American cover art
- Developer: Artdink
- Publishers: JP: Artdink; WW: Sony Computer Entertainment
- Director: Kazutoshi Iida
- Series: Aquanaut's Holiday
- Platform: PlayStation
- Release: JP: June 30, 1995; NA: July 26, 1996; EU: October 11, 1996
- Genres: Adventure, Simulation
- Mode: Single-player

Aquanaut's Holiday (Note: Japanese: アクアノートの休日, Hepburn: Aquanaut no Kyuujitsu) is an adventure video game developed by Artdink for the PlayStation. It was released by Artdink in Japan in June 1995 and internationally by Sony Computer Entertainment in 1996. The game is an underwater simulation in which the player assumes the role of an overworked marine explorer who returns to the water for pleasure after having brought harmony to the world's oceans. Aquanaut's Holiday was followed by two sequels on the PlayStation and Aquanaut's Holiday: Hidden Memories on the PlayStation 3, all of which are exclusive to Japan.

== Gameplay ==
Gameplay in Aquanaut's Holiday takes place in a first-person perspective and consists primarily of the player exploring vast stretches of ocean, occasionally discovering underwater ruins or treasure, or communicating with underwater creatures. The game has no time limits, enemies, or other obstacles. The game's objective, aside from exploring, is to build a large coral reef to attract a wide variety of fish and other marine wildlife.

== Development ==
Aquanaut's Holiday was developed by the Japanese studio Artdink and directed by Kazutoshi Iida. The game designer was also behind Artdink's Tail of the Sun and later headed development of Doshin the Giant for the GameCube. The game was first revealed untitled in 1994.

== Reception ==
Reception

Review scores
Publication	Score
AllGame	3/5
Computer and Video Games	4/5
Famitsu	8/10, 6/10, 6/10, 4/10
Hyper	75%
IGN	8/10
Next Generation	4/5
Play	58%
Dengeki PlayStation	85/100, 75/100, 90/100, 60/100

Aquanaut's Holiday was released on June 30, 1995 in Japan for the PlayStation. The game won a Japan Software Award in 1996. Critical reception has been mixed. USA magazine Next Generation reviewed the game as an import prior to its release in North America. The magazine commented that "Seen from a first-person perspective, AH's exotic sea life and realistic landscapes soon have you believing you really are exploring the floor of the ocean. And though the gaming aspect is a little on the subtle side, it's enjoyable just swimming around." They scored it four out of five stars. Their later, much briefer review of the domestic release lowered the score to two stars and said "Points for effort, but most gamers will be bored." IGN stated that Aquanaut's Holiday does not truly qualify as a game, but instead "a fun and immersive 3D underwater sim of the most relaxing kind". Shawn Sackenheim of Allgame likewise called the game to be a great stress-reliever and complimented its "beautiful" presentation and "rewarding" gameplay model. Victor Lucas of The Electric Playground agreed that the graphics were most impressive, but ultimately found the combination of exploration gameplay and atmospheric music extremely boring. NowGamer was also unimpressed, summarizing, "Unless you’ve got more money than sense, our advice is to save your pennies and spend them on a title that truly pushes the PlayStation to its technical limits without relying on the contents of Captain Birdseye’s pantry."

The game sold more than 200,000 units in Japan.

== Legacy ==
Aquanaut's Holiday was followed by a few Japan-exclusive releases. Aquanaut's Holiday: Memories of Summer 1996, a re-release of the game with a few minor updates such as customizable controls, was released on the PlayStation in 1996. A sequel, Aquanaut's Holiday 2, was released in 1999. Both games were later made available for download on the PlayStation 3 and PlayStation Portable in 2008. Another game, Aquanaut's Holiday: Hidden Memories, was released for the PlayStation 3 in 2008.
