= Doshin the Giant =

1999 God simulation video game

- European GameCube cover art
- Developer: Param
- Publishers: JP: RandnetDD (64DD); WW: Nintendo (GCN)
- Director: Kazutoshi Iida
- Producers: Hiroshi Masuyama; Shigeru Miyamoto; Kenji Miki
- Designer: Gabon Shibata
- Programmers: Tomohiko Yagisawa; Shinichi Sasaki; Giles Goddard (GCN)
- Artists: Takao Kurebayashi; Hiromichi Iwasaki
- Composer: Tatsuhiko Asano
- Platforms: 64DD, GameCube
- Release: 64DD: JP: December 1999; GameCube: JP: March 14, 2002; EU: September 20, 2002
- Genre: God game
- Mode: Single-player

Doshin the Giant (Note: Known in Japan as Kyojin no Doshin (巨人のドシン)) is a god game developed by Param and originally published by RandnetDD (Note: RandnetDD Co., Ltd. was a joint venture between Nintendo and Recruit to distributed the 64DD and its online service, Randnet.) for the Nintendo 64's 64DD add-on. It was originally released in Japan in December 1999 as a launch title for 64DD. The game was later ported to the GameCube and published by Nintendo in Japan on March 14, 2002, and Europe on September 20, 2002. The game was never released in North America.

The game received positive reviews from critics, as did its soundtrack composed by Tatsuhiko Asano, which was released on CD by Media Factory in early 2000. An expansion for the 64DD version titled Kyojin no Doshin: Kaihō Sensen Chibikko Chikko Daishūgou, featuring short animated clips that can be unlocked by creating monuments in the original game, was released on June 30, 2000 to negative reviews from critics.

== Gameplay ==
As a god game, Doshin the Giant's gameplay revolves around god-like abilities and tasks, such as altering the geography, managing natural disasters or answering prayers from simulated worshippers. Its designer Kazutoshi Iida has described it as "Populous meets Mario".

The player controls the Doshin as he tries to help or hinder the island's inhabitants. Doing so causes the villagers to release love or hate, which Doshin absorbs. The two feelings cancel each other out, but if he gets enough of one type, he will grow in size. Doshin is the Love Giant, a yellow, featureless giant with a happy face and a few strands of hair. He is a benevolent being whose helpful actions earn love from his people and cause his body to increase in size for a day and return to normal size the next day. He can pick up objects such as people and trees. Doshin can transform at will into his evil alter ego Jashin, the Hate Giant. In the GameCube version, he has wings and clawed feet and inspires Hate monuments that are slightly different from the Love monuments Doshin can earn. Jashin is known to be a destructive force to the natives, the opposite of Doshin's nature. With his bad actions, people show him their dislike, and he increases in size. The only thing the two giants have in common is that both have an outie belly button. Although he cannot pick up things, he can send streams of fire across the land, destroying structures in their way. Doshin and Jashin can both raise and lower terrain.

The four native tribes on the island are separated with the color of their clothing (red, green, yellow, blue). The female natives are dressed in a sleeveless, uni-colored gown of their tribe's color. The male natives wear a kilt and hat of their tribe's color, but remain shirtless, also showing outie belly buttons. In the GameCube version the people also raise farm animals, and there are fish in the water. There are several threats that also endanger the villagers, such as tornadoes, volcanoes, fires, being crushed by Doshin, and even jealous tribe members named "Naughties".

An album stores photographic snapshots of the gameplay itself, and the player can examine a monument gallery closely for more information. In the GameCube version, completing the game unlocks a "New Map" option with various islands and various themed layouts and textures.

Developer Kazutoshi Iida notes "the sheer simplicity of the user-interface, as the game can be played without numbers or letters". He added, "Mr. Shigeru Miyamoto from Nintendo has said that computer games incorporate a world-wide common language, and Doshin illustrates this very clearly."

== Story ==
The game opens on an island called Barudo, with a spoken narration, by an island native. This man, named Sodoru, who wears a mask on his face, tells the legend of a giant that rises out of the sea as the morning sun rises. As he tells the player this, a yellow giant named Doshin appears from out of the water.

The player then takes control of the giant. Sodoru then tells the player what the other inhabitants of the island want such as trees or hills raised and lowered. He then suggests helping the people, for which they will reward the giant with love, and might build a monument to it. Sodoru then suggests that the giant help bring the four tribes together. It takes Doshin many days to do this, and at the end of each day as the sun sets he returns to the sea. Finally, when every possible combination of tribes has been reached, the islanders then build one final monument called the Tower of Babel, which causes the island and Doshin to sink into the sea, killing everyone including Doshin. Doshin's body becomes a new island, with two members of each of the tribes on it as before, and a new incarnation of Doshin walks out onto the island to continue the story. The GameCube version has an additional portion after this ending, with new islanders building a large rocket that blasts them up into space.

== Developer ==
Company logo

Param was a Japanese video game development company that worked in partnership with Nintendo to develop Doshin the Giant and its expansion. The company was headed up by Takao Kurebayashi, Kazutoshi Iida and Yana. Param was a part of Marigul Management. Param was defunct as Marigul was liquidated in May 2003.

Kazutoshi Iida, a graduate of Tama Art University born in 1968, founded Param in 1997. Before Param, Iida lead development of Tail of the Sun and Aquanaut's Holiday. Iida moved on to a company called Umigame Bunko, translated as Sea Turtle Library, and worked with Marvelous Entertainment on Discipline for WiiWare. Iida became a professor of Film at Ritsumeikan University.

== Reception and sales ==
Reception

Aggregate score
Aggregator	Score
GameRankings	69.10%

Review scores
Publication	Score
Famitsu	32 / 40
GamesMaster	62 out of 100
GameSpot	6.8 out of 10
IGN	6.8 out of 10
NGC Magazine	62 out of 100
Nintendo World Report	9 out of 10

Doshin the Giant was first publicly displayed at Nintendo's Space World '99 trade show on August 27–29, 1999. Developer Kazutoshi Iida recalled a "continuous line of people queued to use the eight playable test units, and the 'Large Screen Experience'". He said that the foreign press received the game "very enthusiastically".

It was fantastic to see the captivated expressions of the young children, some of whom came on each of the three days especially to play Doshin! During the project, we hadn't given much thought to the target market, but we were very pleased by its obvious attraction for children. This attraction isn't really surprising, since children, more than anyone, have a burning desire to grow in size. Thinking back to my own childhood, I recall being very enamoured by anything gigantic, so their reaction could actually have been anticipated.

— Kazutoshi Iida, describing Space World '99

Doshin the Giant was a hit game in Japan, peaking at #1 and becoming the ninth best-selling game of 2002. In the UK, it peaked at #9 and is the 65th best-selling game (and 22nd best-selling GameCube game) of 2002 and hit the top of the GameCube charts. Doshin went on to appear as a trophy in Super Smash Bros. Melee, holding a villager in his hands; Jashin appears as a secret trophy in the lottery as Hate Giant.

Drew Mackie of the Singing Mountain podcast noted the game for its "trippy tropicalia" soundtrack and said it was "worth a second look".

== Kyojin no Doshin: Kaihō Sensen Chibikko Chikko Daishūgō ==
Kyojin no Doshin: Kaihō Sensen Chibikko Chikko Daishūgō
- Developer: Param
- Publisher: RandnetDD
- Composer: Tatsuhiko Asano
- Platform: 64DD
- Release: JP: June 30, 2000
- Genre: Puzzle
- Mode: Single-player

Kyojin no Doshin Kaihō Sensen Chibikko Chikko Daishūgō (Note: Kyojin no Doshin Kaihō Sensen Chibikko Chikko Daishūgō (巨人のドシン解放戦線チビッコチッコ大集合, lit. Doshin the Giant: Rescue from the front by toddlers tinkling at great conversation room.)) is a 64DD expansion to the original, released on June 30, 2000. It requires the Doshin the Giant disk to operate.

=== Gameplay ===
When started for the first time, the game will ask for the Doshin 1 disk to modify the game so that each of its events will be logged if encountered. In the game, a child is told to go to sleep and is pulled out of bed and through the window, into a world of dreams. There, Doshin is now imprisoned, and the child can tinkle 2D hearts on people and the giant. The main objective of the game is to watch the 17 mini black and white movies collectively titled More Than Giant. The player must repeatedly go back and forth between the two disks to verify that monuments were built in game 1, and to complete tasks that the "Queen Companions" request of them.

Another objective is to free Doshin from his imprisonment, by causing him to grow larger than his cage. This will cause the game credits to begin.

The player can also gather help to free Doshin. After creating monuments in "Doshin 1" and their counterpart pavilions, children will appear in the Expo area. The player can tinkle on them with their hearts, and they will join the player's team, becoming "Teamers" or teamsters. There are two other teams that the player can choose from at the start of the game. When enough pavilions are completed the player can battle the other teamster groups in a tinkle contest. If the player wins, the loser's team members become neutral and can be added to their team. The team can be made of up to six other children. This gives the player six times more tinkling hearts that can be poured onto Doshin to try and free him.

The player is given a meter for love which they can use on the other people, billboards, or Doshin. However, if the heart becomes too full, or the player is beaten at a tinkle contest, it causes the player to wake up. After Doshin is released, he will start destroying the entire place, then flooding it with yellow fluid from his belly button which is discovered to be a plug, then the player's character wakes up to find that they now have a stained blanket, which the mother lectures the child about. At this moment Doshin appears from behind the blanket, and part of the child jumps into dreamland, as a Queen Companion appears asking if the player wants to play again. From that point the credits begin as the live-action FMV of camera descending down a pipe plays.

=== Reception ===
Peer Schneider of IGN rated the game at 2.5 out of 10, citing the graphics, controls, and gameplay. He said it "[l]ooks and plays like it was programmed in two weeks. Controls are bad" and "this add-on disk is a glorified movie player." The only thing he found appealing about the game was its presentation, saying that "[t]he Param team definitely has a sense of humor. Both Doshin games will make you laugh because they're so absurd." He ended his review of the game with one word: "Painful".

== See also ==
- Dualism, the theological concept
- Black & White, a similar god sim, game where the player can be either good or bad, by Lionhead
- SimCity 64, another 64DD game where the player builds a city, and needs to protect its citizens from disasters
- Aquanaut's Holiday and Tail of the Sun, two other games by designer Kazutoshi Iida
