= C.E.O. (video game) =

1995 video game

- North American cover art featuring James Coburn
- Developers: ERE Informatique; Artdink
- Publishers: NA: I-Motion; EU: Infogrames Multimedia SA
- Series: A-Train
- Platform: MS-DOS
- Release: 1995
- Genre: Business simulation
- Mode: Single-player

C.E.O., known in Europe as A IV Network$ (or A4 Networks), is a business simulation game developed by French studio ERE Informatique and Japanese studio Artdink. It is an international version of A-Train IV, which was originally released on Japanese computers. C.E.O. was published by I-Motion in North America and Infogrames Multimedia SA in Europe for MS-DOS in 1995. A CD-ROM version was also released with full-motion video cutscenes featuring James Coburn.

== Gameplay ==
C.E.O. is a game about management training, with features such as stocks and subsidiaries.

== Reception ==
Reception

Review scores
Publication	Score
Computer Game Review	54/100
Joystick	176/200
Next Generation	2/5
PC Format	79%
PC Gamer (US)	65/100
PC Games (DE)	69%
PC Zone	80/100
Entertainment Weekly	B
Génération 4	85%
PC Joker	67%
PC Player	76/100
Play Time	68%
Power Play	81%
Score	6/10

Next Generation rated it two stars out of five, and stated that "When was the last time you saw a real CEO (or anyone for that matter) try to get the busses and trains to run efficiently? This isn't a bad game, but it just doesn't give a good feeling of cohesion." Computer Game Review was negative toward the game; the magazine summarized, "Playability had to be sacrificed to hire known actors for the video clips." The game was also reviewed for Polish magazine Świat Gier Komputerowych, with the reviewer awarding it a score of 6/10.
