= Tail of the Sun =

1996 video game

- Developer: Artdink
- Publishers: JP: Artdink; NA: Sony Computer Entertainment
- Director: Kazutoshi Iida
- Platform: PlayStation
- Release: JP: April 26, 1996; NA: April 22, 1997
- Genre: Action role-playing
- Mode: Single-player

Tail of the Sun, known in Japan as Taiyō no Shippo: Wild, Pure, Simple Life (太陽のしっぽ WILD・PURE・SIMPLE LIFE, Taiyō no Shippo Wairudo, Pyua, Shinpuru Raifu), is an action role-playing video game developed by Artdink for the PlayStation. It was released in Japan in 1996 by Artdink and North America in 1997 by Sony Computer Entertainment. It was created by Kazutoshi Iida, who worked on Aquanaut's Holiday and would later work with Nintendo on Doshin the Giant.

The player's ultimate objective is to build a tower of mammoth tusks that reaches the sun. To this end, a large map full of various creatures and oddities must be traversed in an effort to locate and gather sufficient food for the tribe to thrive and multiply.

The game was re-released in Japan on PlayStation 3 and PlayStation Portable as a PSone Classic in 2006, and on the PlayStation Network the same year.

On December 15, 2025, the game was re-released globally on Steam in Japanese and the Nintendo Switch exclusively for the region of Japan under the title ARTDINK GAME LOG: Tail of the Sun.

== Gameplay ==
When the game begins, the player is situated at the home village with no goals, objectives, or guidance. The protagonist is free, from the outset, to go nearly anywhere and do basically anything. The landscape the player character inhabits is not only shared by a variety of polygonal fauna, but by flora rendered in the form of Mochi of various shapes and colors, which have varying effects on one's health and various stats.

While exploring the landscape, the player's character will need to sleep, and will often choose to do so while in the middle of hunting or swimming. The North American release allows the player to wake the caveman up when this occurs.

== Development ==
Tail of the Sun was developed by Artdink and directed by Kazutoshi Iida. When developing this game, Iida wanted to make the "anti-Mario game," explaining that the enjoyment of Super Mario Bros. derives from the action rather than the premise of saving Princess Peach. Iida was wowed by Super Mario 64, as the exploration of a 3D space was what they were aiming for with this, and using the same methods. However, he felt that a character like Mario, it's "impossible to imagine a game without a happy end," wanting to make a game without a happy ending.

Iida designed the game with a "counter-intuitive approach" at times, citing how the player-character would intermittently fall asleep during the action. Iida believed that this made the parts where the character was awake more entertaining as a result. Iida discussed how he feels "suspicious" about claims that a game must be fun to be a game, arguing that games like Crazy Climber and Frogger were not really fun, and exaggeratedly expressing a desire to create an "un-fun game."

== Reception ==
Reception

Aggregate score
Aggregator	Score
GameRankings	61%

Review scores
Publication	Score
AllGame	3.5/5
CNET Gamecenter	4/10
Edge	5/10
Electronic Gaming Monthly	2.5/10, 4/10, 2.5/10, 2.5/10
Famitsu	8/10, 6/10, 6/10, 9/10
Game Informer	7.25/10
GameFan	88/100, 93/100, 91/100
GameRevolution	B−
GameSpot	4.4/10
IGN	7/10
Next Generation	4/5
Dengeki PlayStation	65/100, 80/100, 65/100, 85/100
Entertainment Weekly	B

Tail of the Sun has been called a spiritual successor to Artdink's earlier 'non-game' Aquanaut's Holiday. As with Aquanaut's Holiday, its relaxed gameplay style polarized reviewers. On one end, Next Generation said, Tail of the Sun "doesn't fit neatly into any one genre but still gives gamers most everything they want - challenge, tension, humor, and fun - in a way that hasn't been done before." The reviewer also praised the combination of ludicrous and serious concepts and the graphical style. On the other end, the four reviewers of Electronic Gaming Monthly judged the game to be innovative but impenetrable and dull. They were irritated by the player character's falling asleep, and found the game world "surprisingly barren", the graphics primitive, and the premise excessively high concept.

Like EGM, GameSpot contested the idea that the minimalist graphics are stylistically appropriate rather than simply crude ("Tail of the Sun's prehistoric schtick ... seems like an excuse for its often lackluster presentation"), and found both the static camera and the player character's passing out when sleep-deprived irritating. They did praise the way the graphics reflect the passage of time and seasons, but concluded that "there just isn't enough variety here to keep the attention of the upright-walking." Entertainment Weekly had a more mixed response: "Slower than a woolly mammoth, Tail of the Sun won’t likely leave you hollering 'Yabba-dabba-doo,' but it will provide a tranquil alternative to the usual hyperactive videogame fare." GamePro similarly commented that while the slow pace (particularly the player character's slow walking speed and tendency to fall asleep) would not be for everyone, the sheer weirdness, crude yet appealing graphics, and "simple but engrossing strategy" of gameplay mechanics such as eating specific foods to increase stats make it enjoyable.
