= Central Violations Bureau =

- Logo

Agency overview
- Jurisdiction: United States
- Headquarters: P.O. Box 780549 San Antonio, TX 78278
- Parent agency: Administrative Office of the U.S. Courts
- Website: cvb.uscourts.gov

The Central Violations Bureau (CVB) is a national center in the United States responsible for processing violation notices (tickets) issued and payments received for petty offenses charged on a federal violation notice. This includes violations that occur on federal property such as federal buildings, national parks, military installations, post offices, Veteran Affairs medical centers, national wildlife refuges, and national forests. The Central Violations Bureau processes violation notices for violations of federal law that occur outside federal property as well. For example, migratory bird offenses that occur on private property.

Federal tickets are issued by law enforcement personnel from agencies such as the U.S. Park Police, U.S. Fish & Wildlife, U.S. Forest Service, Department of Defense Police, U.S. Coast Guard, U.S. Provost Marshal, Airforce, Marines & Navy Security Forces, U.S. Postal Police, USACE, U.S. Customs, U.S. Border Patrol, and V.A. Police.

The CVB is a division of the Administrative Office of the United States Courts.
