= CBV Sectors =

Vietnam economic indices

CBV-Index is divided into 10 indices of the ten major industries of Vietnam economy (based on ICB-Industry Classification Benchmark, developed by FTSE and Dow Jones Limited, currently in use by NYSE).

These are 10 main industries that reflect Vietnam economic growth and have strong correlation with the macroeconomic cycle of Vietnam:

== See also ==
- CBV Index
- CBV 20
- CBV 10
