= A-Train =

Video game series

- European cover art of A-Train 6
- Genre: Business simulation
- Developer: Artdink
- Publishers: JP: Artdink; NA: Maxis; EU: Ocean Software; EU: Midas Interactive Entertainment
- Platform: Various: FM-7, PC-88, PC-98, Sharp X1, Sharp MZ, Family Computer, MSX2, X68000, Amiga, FM Towns, Mac, Mega Drive, Nintendo DS, 3DS, Nintendo Switch, Nintendo Switch 2, PC Engine, PlayStation, PlayStation 2, PlayStation 4, Super Famicom, Wii, Windows, Xbox 360
- First release: A-Train; 1985
- Latest release: A-Train 9 Evolution; 2026

A-Train (A列車で行こう, Ē Ressha de Ikō; lit. Take the A-Train) is a series of business simulation video games developed and published by Japanese game developer Artdink in Japan. The first game in the series was published in 1985. The first release in the United States was Take the A-Train II, published in 1988 by the Seika Corporation under the title Railroad Empire. However, the most well known U.S. release is Take the A-Train III, published in 1992 by Maxis as simply A-Train. There is also the spin-off title C.E.O.

Release timeline
1985	A-Train
1986
1987
1988	A-Train II
1989
1990	A-Train III
1991
1992
1993	A-Train IV
1994
1995
1996	A-Train 5
1997
1998
1999	A-Train Z
2000	A-Train 6
2001	A-Train 2001
2002
2003	A-Train The 21st Century
2004
2005	A-Train 7
2006	A-Train EZ
2006	A-Train HX
2007
2008	A-Train 8
2009	A-Train DS
2010	A-Train 9
2011
2012
2013
2014	A-Train 3D
2015
2016	A-Train PC Classic
2017	A-Train Express
2018
2019
2020
2021	A-Train All Aboard! Tourism
2022
2023
2024
2025
2026	A-Train 9 Evolution

== A-Train ==
The first iteration of the A-Train series was released in December 1985 for the FM-7, NEC PC-8801, NEC PC-9801, X1 Turbo, MZ-2500, Family Computer, and MSX2. A Microsoft Windows port followed in April 2000.

== A-Train II ==
The second iteration of the A-Train series was released in July 1988 for the NEC PC-9801 and X68000. In the US, it was released under the name Railroad Empire.

== A-Train III ==
The "New Town" scenario in A-Train 1.0 for Macintosh

Take the A-Train III (known internationally as A-Train) is the third game in the A-Train series. It was originally developed and published by Japanese game developer Artdink for Japan, and was later published by Maxis for the United States. It was originally released in December 1990 for the NEC PC-9801, FM Towns Marty, X68000, and PC Engine (TurboGrafx-16). The US version was released in October 1992 on DOS and Amiga. Later, the Japanese version was re-released in March 2000 for Windows 95 and 98. Artdink ported the A-Train III along with the editor to Windows 95, and published both titles as a package as the 3rd ARTDINK BEST CHOICE title in Japan.

The game puts players in command of a railway company. There are no rival companies; the player controls the only one in the city and the game is resultingly fairly open-ended. A-Train III is the first game in the series to make use of near-isometric dimetric projection to present the city, similar to Maxis's later SimCity 2000. There are two types of transport that the player's company can take: passengers or building materials. The former is more likely to be profitable, but building materials allow the city to grow. Wherever the building materials are delivered, they can be taken and used to construct buildings for the city. These start with houses, but eventually, as an area grows, roads, and shops and other buildings are built. These can provide extra revenue for a passenger service, but also allowing the city to develop and grow can be seen as a goal in itself. As well as the buildings built by the computer, in response to the materials being present, the player can construct their own buildings, such as ski resorts and hotels, and make profits from them if the conditions are right, and if these areas are populated enough.

A.III. Map Construction, known internationally as A-Train Construction Set, is an editor that can change existing saved games, or to build landscapes from scratch. It comes with 6 sample maps. Maxis also published A-Train Construction Set with A-Train as a single package in Europe, without the Ocean Software label.

Reception (A-Train III / A-Train)

Review scores
Publication	Score
Dragon	DOS: 4/5
Famitsu	PC Engine: 29 / 40
GamesMaster	Amiga: 82%
Datormagazin	Amiga: 92%
Svenska Hemdatornytt	DOS: 94%
The One	Amiga: 90%

Award
Publication	Award
Codie award	Best Strategy Program

Computer Gaming World's reviewer stated in 1992 that while he enjoyed the financial and management aspects of A-Train, "many people will miss out on a fine program because of a steeply graded learning curve". The game was reviewed in 1992 in Dragon #187 by Hartley, Patricia, and Kirk Lesser in "The Role of Computers" column. The reviewers gave the game 4 out of 5 stars. In 1993 the game received a Codie award from the Software Publishers Association for Best Strategy Program. A-Train's isometric, tile-based graphics and animated elements inspired the visual style Maxis went on to adopt for Simcity 2000 in 1993.

In 1994, PC Gamer UK named A-Train III the 46th best computer game of all time. The editors wrote, "Fascinating, absorbing and now quite cheap, A-Train is worth a place in any games collection—and don't be put off by the subject matter. It's brilliant fun."

== MD A-Train ==
A Ressha de Ikō MD (Ａ列車で行こうＭＤ; "MD A-Train") is a simulation game involving the construction of a railroad in order to boost the city's mass transit system. The game was released to an exclusively Japanese market; with no release ever being attempted for the North American or European markets.

The player must use the resources at hand to build a railroad connecting the two ends of a map in each scenario. A train can be controlled throughout the day (05:00–17:00) while building new tracks and stations. Nighttime activities (17:00–05:00) involve changing train schedules to better suit the needs of the player's growing mass transportation hub. New developments will spring up around the tracks and stations. This permits the player to increase the amount of money that can earn; resulting in the increased ability to build railroad tracks and stations for the growing city. Five scenarios offer a tutorial mode for first-time players, an extremely hard scenario for veterans, and three more scenarios for players in between the two extremes in difficulty levels. Players can play using speeds that range from slow to normal to fast.

== A-Train IV ==
Released in December 1993 for the NEC PC-9801, FM Towns Marty, Windows 3.1 and Windows 95. It was later re-released on March 17, 2000, for Windows 95 and 98 under the title A-Train 4 15th Anniversary, and again on March 26, 2004, under the name A-Train 4 XP, this time including support for Windows 2000 and XP. Related versions include the Japan-only console launch title release AIV: Evolution in December 1994 for the PS1 and AIV: Evolution Global (released under the title A-Train in North America), also for the PS1, and re-released in January 2007 for the PSP and PS3 and AIV Network$ (known as C.E.O. in North America) in 1995 for MS-DOS and Windows 3.1. Also released in North America was the "A Train Evolution Pack", which included the PlayStation version of AIV: Evolution Global, a PlayStation Mouse, an A Train mousepad, and a PlayStation memory card.

Reception (PlayStation)

Review scores
Publication	Score
Electronic Gaming Monthly	28 / 40 (PS1)
Famitsu	9 / 10 (PS1); 31 / 40 (PS1)
Next Generation	3/5 (PS1)
Famitsu PS	27 / 40 (PS1)
Joypad	84% (PS1)
Video Games (magazine)	83%

On release, Famitsu PS scored the Japanese PlayStation version of AIV: Evolution a 27 out of 40. Five months later, Famitsu magazine's Reader Cross Review gave it a 9 out of 10, and the following week Famitsu scored it a 31 out of 40. The four reviewers of Electronic Gaming Monthly were divided about the PlayStation version of AIV: Evolution Global; Andrew Baran and Mark Lefebvre described it as an addictive and pleasantly time-consuming simulation, while Mike Desmond and Sushi-X felt it to be dull compared to most simulation games, especially other Maxis titles. They scored it 28 out of 40 (average 7 out of 10). Like Desmond and Sushi-X, GamePro felt the game "just doesn't roll with the same FunFactor of other sim games." Next Generation said it was "a quality management title. Unlikely to set the world aflame, however."

== A-Train 5 ==
Released in December 1996 in Japan for Windows 95, this was the first A-Train game to use 3D graphics with a PowerVR graphics accelerator. It was re-released in December 1997, this time including support for the DirectX and Direct3D APIs for the Windows release, and at the same time saw its debut on the PS1. The PS1 version was re-released in April 2007 for the PSP and PS3.

== A-Train Z ==
Released in May 1999 in Japan for the PS1, this was a re-imagining of the first game's setting and objectives, using the 3D engine of A5. A reworked version with an anime aesthetic was released on PSP in June 2006.

== A-Train 6 ==
Released in March 2000 in Japan for the PlayStation 2 as a launch title. The game sold over 1 million units in Japan. The game was later published in Europe during 2004. A-Train 6 features improved graphics over A-Train 5, as well as the ability to play the game entirely in the 3D view across six different regions, each with a task for the player to meet before progressing.

The game also includes a train viewer, and the ability to replay completed levels with trains that have already been unlocked. The player starts each level with ¥10,000,000,000, and will fail the level if their funding goes into the red.

There are 38 different trains available for the player to use in four categories. Commuters have high passenger capacities, suburban trains have generally slightly lower capacities but are faster, express trains have the lowest passenger capacities but are often the fastest, and freight trains, which haul cargo from industries which can be delivered into commercial and residential areas to boost growth.

== A-Train 2001 ==
Released in May 2001 in Japan for the PS2, A-Train 2001 is an improvement over A-Train 6. The game and its dependencies can be installed on the system's hard disk drive. Also, for the first time, people were featured in the game.

== A-Train The 21st Century ==
Released on June 19, 2003, in Japan for Windows, this is essentially a rebadged PC version of A-Train 2001.

== A-Train i ==
Released on the DoCoMo 504i/505i/506i/900 mobile phones as a service planning game and distributed by Hudson Soft. Players had to pay a monthly fee to access the game. The game is no longer available as of March 2012.

== A-Train 7 ==
Marketed as the 20th anniversary title for the A-Train series, it revives the "urban development" gameplay that had been missing since A-Train 5. It was released in Japan on June 26, 2005, for Windows 2000, XP and Vista. Several expansion packs were released for the game.

== A-Train EZ ==
Released by the mobile phone company au by KDDI on the BREW platform in January 2006 and distributed by Hudson Soft, A-Train EZ is similar to A-Train in that it is also a service planning game.

== A-Train HX ==
A-Train HX (A列車で行こうHX, A Ressha de Ikou HX) is a railroad simulation for the Xbox 360. It was released on December 21, 2006, in Japan, supporting high definition graphics (720p resolution) and Xbox Live support for uploading and downloading maps and leaderboards. It is also the first title published by Artdink under the A-Train name for the Japanese market. It was also released in Europe.

The gameplay is similar to A-Train 7, but it has a full 3D view that was previously used in A-Train The 21st Century. However, it comes with map editor as a standard feature. Custom maps can be shared through Xbox Live. Additional Xbox Live features includes leaderboards which contain "Total Capital", "Population" and "Time to 1 Trillion Yen" categories for each map. The Xbox Live features can be used with an Xbox Live Silver account.

Artdink offered over 150 types of trains for sale in Xbox Live Marketplace, based on real-life Japanese trains. The game itself comes with the following trains designed by Artdink: AR3 (Commuter), AR4 (Express), AR5 (LimitedExpress), AR7 (LimitedExpress), ARX (LimitedExpress), U-Shape (Subway), DC4 (Cargo), EC6 (CargoExpress), 186Exp (SuperExpress), Linear (SuperExpress). Before the release of Taiwan version, publisher TTIME Technology held a paper train model contest for winning the game.

Reception (Xbox 360)

Review scores
Publication	Score
Eurogamer	2 / 10
Famitsu	27 / 40
Official Xbox Magazine (UK)	3 / 10
Xbox World	60%

Eurogamer reported that they liked the music in A-Train HX, but concluded that "A-Train HX is badly designed, poorly presented, overcomplicated and utterly tedious", giving it a score of just 2/10. Official Xbox 360 Magazine gave it a slightly better score of 3/10. However, they still called it "The most confusing train wreck of a game ever".

== A-Train 8 ==
Released on March 21, 2008, in Japan for Windows, the game was also released in Europe. The game was released on Steam worldwide on September 18, 2013.

== A-Train DS ==
A-Train DS was released on April 23, 2009, in Japan for the Nintendo DS for 5500 yen. The game featuring touch screen controls and became the first handheld title in the series to have the 3D train view.

== A-Train 9 ==
A-Train 9 was released on February 11, 2010, in Japan, and on March 15, 2012, worldwide by UIG Entertainment under the names The Train Giant in English and Der Bahn Gigant in German. It is compatible with Windows XP, Vista, 7 and 10, and is also compatible with the said 64-bit versions. Two Japan-only building kits were released, the first on October 8, 2010, and the second on December 23, 2010. The Japan version also includes a 3D patch costing ¥1050 that can be played using 3D glasses, and the German version includes an unofficial patch that adds 200 trains to the game on top of the existing 11 trains. This also includes a digital manual featuring how-to-play instructions on urban growth, development and financial management, which are the carried-over core game components.

A-Train 9 includes buses and trucks, grouped by distances they travel and the work they manage (e.g. intercity, local, heavy goods, etc.), power plants, Japanese castles and more authentic-looking Japanese buildings.

On December 7, 2012, A-Train 9 Version 2.0: Professional Edition was released in Japan, supporting Windows XP, Vista, 7 and 8. It is available in DVD format as well as a software patch which users of the original A-Train 9 can upgrade to. Version 2.0 includes all content from the two expansion packs intended for the original A-Train 9 plus several new buildings and trains, as well as several bug fixes. Three DLCs were released for The Train Giant starting on August 1, 2012, with "Shanghai". "Boston" and the "Elbe Estuary" were to follow but are impossible to find. "The Train Giant" can be purchased on eBay for about $10–15. The version with a "3" on the cover contains the three DLCs. On June 29, 2014, a second new version, entitled A-Train Version 3.0: Railway Simulator was later released. This version was then released worldwide on October 10, 2014, via Steam, although due to licensing issues fewer real life trains are available from the Japanese version.

On October 21, 2015, A-Train 9 Version 4.0: Japan Rail Simulator was released on Steam, supporting Windows XP, Vista, 7, 8.1 and 10.

On September 6, 2018, A-Train Version 5.0: Final was released in Japan, supporting Windows 7, 8.1 and 10.

On November 20, 2024, A-Train 9 V5.0 : Japan Train Simulator Ultimate Edition was released in English on Steam. Likely due to its support of Windows 10 and Windows 11 64-bit operating systems, this edition of the game has its own separate listing on Steam.

On November 20, 2024, an expansion titled A-Train9 TRAIN CONSTRUCTION was released on Steam. TRAIN CONSTRUCTION is a vehicle customization tool that allows creating trains in a variety of shapes and colors.

On June 4, 2026, A-Train 9 Evolution, a revamped port of A-Train 9, was released in Japan for the Nintendo Switch 2.

On September 24, 2026, A-Train 9 PRIME LINE was announced for a December 9, 2026 release on PC. It is planned to be the ultimate edition of the game, "beyond evolution," and includes content from previous versions.

== A-Train 3D ==
Originally planned for 2011, A-Train 3D was released in Japan on February 13, 2014, in North America on April 14, 2015, and in Europe on April 16, 2015, as A-Train 3D: City Simulator. It was published by Natsume Inc. for the Nintendo eShop on Nintendo 3DS. Nintendo eShop pre-orders also received the soundtrack.

== A-Train PC Classic ==
Based on A-Train 3D, A-Train PC Classic was released in Japanese on Steam on December 14, 2016. On June 8, 2017, the English version was officially released.

== A-Train Express ==
A-Train Express, a port of A-Train 9 with PlayStation VR support, was released in Japan for the PlayStation 4 on December 21, 2017. In January 2019, the game received a rating from ESRB signaling publisher Degica Games intent on bringing the game to the United States. It was subsequently released by Limited Run Games on May 22, 2019.

== A-Train All Aboard! Tourism ==
A-Train All Aboard! Tourism was released worldwide on March 12, 2021, for Nintendo Switch. Published by Artdink themselves, it was first announced on February 12, 2020, via Artdink's Twitter account as a "Switch version of A-Train", the latest game for Nintendo systems following the 3DS version. Following shortly after the game's announcement. Artdink revealed the new secretary character, designed by Yuji Himukai, best known for character design works for the Etrian Odyssey series, and also work as the character designer for this game.

On October 28, 2020. It was revealed that the game's official Japanese title is A-Train Hajimaru Kankou Keikaku, and it will come out in 2021 in Japan. On January 6, 2021. The game's release date was revealed to be March 12, 2021. And it would support Japanese, English, Traditional / Simplified Chinese, and Korean language.

On January 14, 2021. The game's official English website was opened. The game's official English title was revealed as A-Train All Aboard! Tourism. The game was also revealed to be a simultaneous worldwide release, with both physical and digital releases available in Japan, South Korea, Hong Kong, and Taiwan, and digital releases everywhere else on launch.

The game was ported to PC and is available on Steam.

An expansion pack with the title "Vistas Abound" was released in Japan.

A Nintendo Switch 2 port, titled A-Train: All Aboard! Tourism – Nintendo Switch 2 Edition was released on December 18, 2025.
