= MidCap Advisors =

MidCap Advisors, LLC
- Company type: Private
- Industry: Investment Banking
- Founded: 1989; 37 years ago
- Headquarters: New York, New York, United States
- Key people: Douglas T. Hendrickson (Co-Founding Partner); John D. Poppe (Co-Founding Partner); Frank J. Robertson (Partner); Ryan B. Sanford (Managing Director); Michael J. Fitzgerald (Managing Director); Scott A. Yoder (Managing Director)
- Number of employees: 20 (2015)
- Website: www.midcapadvisors.com

MidCap Advisors is an American boutique investment bank that specializes in mergers & acquisitions while also providing strategic planning, capital raising, and business valuation services to mid-market companies across the United States.

The company has three groups: Insurance & Financial Services, Education, and Generalist (completing deals in the Transportation & Logistics, Manufacturing, Homeland Defense & Security, and Healthcare sectors).

== History ==
The company was founded in 1989 by two former Chemical Bank (now known as JPMorgan Chase & Co.) executives, Douglas T. Hendrickson and John D. Poppe. Over the last twenty years, MidCap has worked on many significant deals across the middle market.

== Operations ==
The company’s main office is located on the Upper East Side in New York City. MidCap also has offices in Chicago, Boston, Philadelphia, and Kansas City. As of 2012, MidCap had 20 employees across its multiples offices.
