= BCV: Battle Construction Vehicles =

2000 video game

- Developer: Artdink
- Publishers: JP: Artdink; EU: Midas Interactive Entertainment
- Platform: PlayStation 2
- Release: JP: June 1, 2000; EU: November 28, 2003
- Genre: Fighting
- Modes: Single-player, multiplayer

BCV: Battle Construction Vehicles, known in Japan as Kensetsu Jūki Kenka Battle: Buchigire Kongō!! (建設重機喧嘩バトル ぶちギレ金剛!!), is a non-traditional fighting video game for the PlayStation 2 game console, where the player must battle in various construction vehicles.

The game was only released in Europe and Japan. It was also one of the first PlayStation 2 titles to be released in DVD-ROM format, rather than CD-ROM as most early PS2 titles were.

The story in this game revolves around the player settling construction site contracts through vehicular combat with various rival companies over the course of 16 levels. The player uses vehicles commonly found on construction sites like diggers and bulldozers. Additional characters can be unlocked by playing the story. The European release notably gives the characters English accents.

== Reception ==
German GamePro Magazine commended the game's concept as a "excavator-em up", but criticized the vehicles as "sluggish", the controls not being easy to understand and the game's lack of sharpness in the gameplay.
