= Artdink =

Japanese video game company

Artdink Corporation
- Logo since 1995
- Native name: 株式会社アートディンク
- Type: Kabushiki gaisha
- Industry: Video games
- Founded: April 21, 1986; 40 years ago
- Headquarters: Tokyo, Japan
- Key people: Tatsuo Nagahama (President)
- Products: A-Train series
- Website: www.artdink.co.jp

Artdink Corporation (株式会社アートディンク) is a Japanese video game developer founded in 1986 and based in Tsukishima, Tokyo.

While Artdink had released a large variety of games, they are best known in Japan for the A-Train series. They are closely associated with Sony Computer Entertainment since the PlayStation's early days, and more recently with Square Enix.

== Overview ==
The company name comes from "ART" meaning "work" and "DINK" standing for "DI" (two) + "NK" (N and K), as the company was founded by four people: two starting with the letter N (Nagahama and another person), and two starting with a K (former executives Kasai Katsushige and Kanda Hideo). The company name itself remains the same as when it was founded, but the company logo design has been changed once.

The company was founded without any intention of starting a game company. Nagahama, Kawanishi, and others were developing assemblers for Motorola CPUs as a hobby. They tried selling these assemblers and gained popularity, so four high school classmates who had previously worked in the film industry, the Defense Agency, and department stores decided to start a business together. While it would have been difficult to sustain the company on that alone, they saw potential for business in the emerging computer game market, and so they decided to work on games. The original A-Train was a product of considerable effort by Kawanishi and others, who were not particularly knowledgeable about games.

Initially, the company was run as a "research laboratory," and there was a time when all employees wore white coats. Sales promotion was mainly through campaigns and magazine advertisements, but TV commercials were aired for A5, Navito, and A-Train DS. During the period when games for the PC-9801 series were the main focus, a demo disc was sent to all registered users.

Since its founding, the company has had offices in Tokyo and around Tokyo Bay on the coast of Chiba Prefecture, and its signature work, the A-Train series, is often modeled after buildings in the Mihama Ward area. Since its 3D release, buildings in the Kaihin Makuhari area have also been used as models. For example, the "D" sign on the department store in the PlayStation version of A-Train 5 is modeled after the D Mart (now Aeon Marine Pia Specialty Store) at Inage-kaigan Station in Mihama Ward, where the company's headquarters were located at the time of development. This is because it was adjacent to the head office building and was frequented by many employees at the time.

== Games ==
1988–1989

- A-Ressha de Ikou II (X68000)
- A-Ressha de Ikou II: Shin Map (X68000)
- Double Eagle (X68000)
- Double Eagle: Tricky Hole (X68000)
- How Many Robot (PC88, MSX, X68000)
- Daikairei: Dai Nippon Teikoku Kaigun no Kiseki (X68000)
- Daikairei: Nankai to Shitou (X68000)
- Daikairei: Power Kit to Shin Scenario Make Kit (X68000)
- Railroad Empire (PC)

1990–1999

- A-Ressha de Ikou II: Gentei Okaidoku Han (X68000)
- Daikairei: Dai Nippon Teikoku Gentei Okaidokuban (X68000)
- Daikairei: Nankai no Shitou Gentei Okaidokuban (X68000)
- Daikairei: Nankai no Shitou Tsuika Scenario (X68000)
- Daikairei: Tsuika Scenario (X68000)
- Eikan wa Kimi ni: Koukou Yakyuu Zenkoku Taikai (X68000)
- Far Side Moon: Chikyuu Boueidan 2 (X68000)
- Kikou Shidan (X68000)
- A-Ressha de Ikou (Famicom)
- A-Ressha de Ikou III (X68000, PC Engine, Super Famicom)
- A-Ressha de Ikou III Map Construction (X68000)
- A-Ressha de Ikou III Map Construction Shin Map Tsuki (X68000)
- The Atlas (PC-9801)
- The Atlas HD Senyou Ban (PC-9801)
- The Atlas 2 (PC-9801)
- A-Ressha de Ikou IV (PC-9801, PlayStation)
- The Atlas: Renaissance Voyager (PC Engine)
- Eikan wa Kimi ni: Koukou Yakyuu Zenkoku Taikai (PC Engine)
- The Atlas (Super Famicom)
- Lunatic Dawn FX (PC-FX)
- Aquanaut's Holiday (PlayStation)
- Tail of the Sun (PlayStation)
- ToPoLo (PlayStation)
- A-Ressha de Ikou V (PlayStation)
- A-Train (PlayStation)
- A-Ressha de Ikou Z: Mezase! Tairiku Oudan (PlayStation)
- C.E.O. (PC)
- Carnage Heart (PlayStation)
- Carnage Heart EZ: Easy Zapping (PlayStation)
- Kaze no Notam (PlayStation)
- Kowloon's Gate (PlayStation)
- Colony Wars (PlayStation)
- The Conveni Special (PlayStation)
- The FamiRes (PlayStation)
- Lunatic Dawn III (PlayStation)
- Navit (PlayStation)
- Neo Atlas (PlayStation)
- No One Can Stop Mr. Domino! (PlayStation)
- Ogre Battle: The March of the Black Queen (PlayStation)
- SimCity 2000 (PlayStation)
- Susume! Kaizoku (PlayStation)
- Zeus: Carnage Heart Second (PlayStation)
- Vampir: Kyuuketsuki Densetsu (PlayStation)
- Aquanaut no Kyuujitsu: Memories of Summer 1996 (PlayStation)
- A-Ressha de Ikou Z: Mezase! Tairiku Oudan (PlayStation)
- Aquanaut no Kyuujitsu 2 (PlayStation)
- Eikan wa Kimi ni 4 (PlayStation)
- Neo Atlas II (PlayStation)
- Zeus II: Carnage Heart (PlayStation)
- Lunatic Dawn Odyssey (PlayStation)
- Tactics Ogre: Let Us Cling Together (PlayStation)

2000–2009

- A-Train 6 (PlayStation 2)
- Turnabout (PlayStation)
- BCV: Battle Construction Vehicles (PlayStation 2)
- Lagnacure Legend (PlayStation)
- Eikan wa Kimi ni: Koushien e no Michi (PlayStation 2)
- Mahjong Gokuu Taisei (PlayStation 2)
- Neo Atlas III (PlayStation 2)
- Lunatic Dawn Tempest (PlayStation 2)
- A-Ressha de Ikou 2001 (PlayStation 2)
- Basic Studio: Powerful Game Koubou (PlayStation 2)
- Mr. Golf (PlayStation 2)
- Train Kit for A-Ressha de Ikou 2001 (PlayStation 2)
- Shenseiki Evangelion Typing E-Keikaku (PlayStation 2)
- Eikan wa Kimi ni: Koushien no Hasha (PlayStation 2)
- Gendai Yougo no Kiso Chishiki 2001 (PlayStation 2)
- Katei no Igaku TV Ware Series (PlayStation 2)
- The Seed: WarZone (PlayStation 2)
- Nihongo Daijiten (PlayStation 2)
- Pro Atlas for TV: Zengokuban (PlayStation 2)
- Pro Atlas for TV: Kinki (PlayStation 2)
- Pro Atlas for TV: Shutoken (PlayStation 2)
- Pro Atlas for TV: Toukai (PlayStation 2)
- A-Ressha de Ikou 2001 Perfect Set (PlayStation 2)
- Motto Golful Golf (PlayStation 2)
- The FamiRes (PlayStation)
- Eikan wa Kimi ni 2004: Koushien no Kodou (PlayStation 2)
- Gundam Battle Tactics (PlayStation Portable)
- Zipang (PlayStation 2)
- A-Train HX (Xbox 360)
- Carnage Hearts Portable (PlayStation Portable)
- Gundam Battle Royale (PlayStation Portable)
- Lisa to Issho ni Tairiku Oudan: A-Ressha de Ikou (PlayStation Portable)
- Gundam Battle Chronicle (PlayStation Portable)
- Aquanaut's Holiday: Kakusareta Kiroku (PlayStation 3)
- Macross Ace Frontier (PlayStation Portable)
- Souykuu no Fafner: Dead Aggressor (PlayStation Portable)
- A-Ressha de Ikou DS (Nintendo DS)
- Fossil Fighters (Nintendo DS)
- Gundam Battle Universe (PlayStation Portable)
- Macross Ultimate Frontier (PlayStation Portable)

2010

- A-Ressho de Ikou DS: Navigation Pack (Nintendo DS)
- A-Train 9 (PC)
- Carnage Heart EXA (PlayStation Portable)
- Gundam Assault Survive (PlayStation Portable)
- Tantei Opera Milky Holmes
- Macross Trial Frontier (PlayStation 3)

- Included with the movie Macross Frontier: The False Songstress in a hybrid Blu-ray Disc.

- AKB1/48: Idol to Koishitara... (PlayStation Portable)

2011

- Macross Triangle Frontier (PlayStation Portable)
- Macross Last Frontier (PlayStation 3)

- Included with the movie Macross Frontier: The Wings of Goodbye in a hybrid Blu-ray Disc.

- AKB1/48: Idol to Guam de Koishitara (PlayStation Portable)

2012

- A-Ressha de Ikou 3D (Nintendo 3DS)
- Bipedal Movement Simulation (PlayStation 3)
- Gundam Seed Battle Destiny (PlayStation Vita)
- Tantei Opera Milky Holmes 2
- Macross: My Boyfriend is a Pilot 2012 (PlayStation 3)

Included with the movie Macross: Do You Remember Love? in a hybrid Blu-ray Disc.

- AKB1/149: Renai Sousenkyo (PlayStation Portable)

2013

- Battle Robot Damashii (PlayStation Portable)
- Macross 30: Voices across the Galaxy (PlayStation 3)
- Dragon Ball Z: Battle of Z (PlayStation 3, PlayStation Vita, Xbox 360)
- Puella Magi Madoka Magica: The Battle Pentagram (PlayStation Vita)

2014

- A-Train 3D: City Simulator (Nintendo 3DS)

2015

- Sword Art Online: Lost Song (PlayStation Vita, PlayStation 3, PlayStation 4)
- World Trigger: Borderless Mission (PlayStation Vita)

2016

- Macross Delta Scramble (PlayStation Vita)
- Neo Atlas 1469 (PlayStation Vita, Windows)
- A-Ressha de Ikou 3D NEO (Nintendo 3DS)
- A-Train PC Classic (Windows)

2017

- A-Train Express (PlayStation 4)
- Accel World vs. Sword Art Online: Millennium Twilight (PlayStation 4, PlayStation Vita, Windows)

2018

- Neo Atlas 1469 (Nintendo Switch)

2019

- A-Ressha de Ikou Exp. + (PlayStation 4)
- Sword Art Online: Lost Song (Windows)

2020

- Witch Spring 3 Re:Fine -The Story of the Marionette Witch Eirudy (Nintendo Switch)

2021

- A-Train: All Aboard! Tourism (Nintendo Switch, Windows)
- Wonder Boy: Asha in Monster World (Nintendo Switch, PlayStation 4)

2022

- Triangle Strategy (Nintendo Switch)
- Soul Hackers 2 (Windows, Xbox One)
- SD Gundam Battle Alliance (Nintendo Switch, PlayStation 4, PlayStation 5, Windows, Xbox One, Xbox Series X/S)

2024

- Dragon Quest III: HD-2D Remake (Nintendo Switch, PlayStation 5, Windows, Xbox Series X/S)

2025

- Dragon Quest I & II: HD-2D Remake (Nintendo Switch, Nintendo Switch 2, PlayStation 5, Windows, Xbox Series X/S)

== Related Topics ==
- Studio Artdink - A former affiliated company that provided contract development and debugging services for game software. On July 24, 2018, ITL Holdings acquired all of Studio Artdink's outstanding shares and made it a group company, resulting in the dissolution of the partnership with Artdink. On April 1, 2024, the company name was changed to G Choice Co., Ltd.
