= National Agricultural Cooperative Federation =

Cooperative company in South Korea

National Agricultural Cooperative Federation (NACF/Nonghyup)
- NACF Official Logo. The 'V' shape signifies a 'bud' and 'rice', which means the eternal development of Korean agriculture while 'O' shape stands for 'smoothness', 'money' and 'cooperation'.

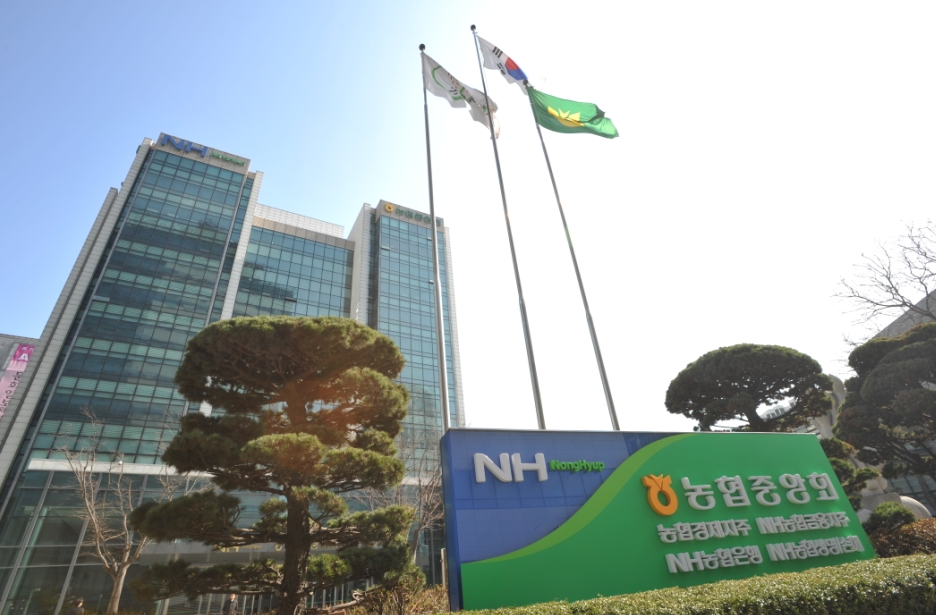
- NACF headquarters in Seoul
- Native name: 농협중앙회/농업협동조합
- Type: Cooperative federation
- Industry: Banking, agricultural marketing & supply, livestock marketing & supply and extension services
- Founded: August 15, 1961; 65 years ago
- Headquarters: Seoul, South Korea
- Area served: South Korea
- Key people: Lee Sung-hee (chairman)
- Revenue: KRW 36.289 trillion (2011)
- Operating income: KRW 964 billion (2011)
- Net income: KRW 703 billion (2011)
- Total assets: KRW 305 trillion (2011)
- Owner: Parliament of Korea
- Members: Parliament of Korea
- Subsidiaries: Nonghyup Bank; NH Investment & Securities

Korean name
- Hangul: 농협중앙회; 농업협동조합
- Hanja: 農協中央會; 農業協同組合
- RR: Nonghyeop junganghoe; Nongeop hyeopdongjohap
- MR: Nonghyŏp chunganghoe; Nongŏp hyŏptongjohap
- Website: www.nonghyup.com/eng

The South Korean National Agricultural Cooperative Federation (initialized as NH (in Korean, derived from NongHyup) or NACF) was established in 1961 to enhance the social and economic status of its membership and to promote a balanced development of the national economy. Its role is divided into three areas: marketing and supply, banking and insurance, and extension services.

== Terminology ==
Although literally referring to local member cooperatives, the term nonghyup is used by South Koreans to describe both a local cooperative (농협) and the NACF (농협중앙회).

== History ==
- 2012 - NACF restructured into a federation with two holding companies, to increase effectiveness and competitiveness
- 2011 - Ranked ninth largest cooperative by the International Cooperative Alliance
- 2011 - Opened NH Residential Hall to accommodate 500 students from farming households
- 2011 - Launched 50th anniversary emblem and slogan
- 2008 - Ranked third largest cooperative by the International Cooperative Alliance
- 2008 - Opened International Banking(IB) center
- 2007 - CHOI Won-Byung inaugurated as chairman of the NACF
- 2006 - Hosted the 37th World Farmers' Congress of the International Federation of Agricultural Producers (IFAP)
- 2006 - Launched NH Investment and Securities after the acquisition of Sejong Securities
- 2005 - Introduced the CEO system for each business division
- 2004 - Launched the "New Rural Community and New Agricultural Cooperative" campaign
- 2004 - Established Nonghyup Culture and Welfare Foundation
- 2002 - Co-founded NH-CA Asset Management, Ltd. with the French Crédit Agricole
- 2001 - Hosted the International Co-operative Alliance(ICA) General Assembly
- 2000 - Launched the integrated NACF, consolidating the federations of agricultural, livestock, and ginseng cooperatives
- 1998 - Acquired ISO 9002 certification for the NACF brand Kimchi, which was designated the official food for 1998 Olympics
- 1995 - Founded the Korea Agricultural Cooperative Marketing, Inc, a subsidiary for produce distribution and sales
- 1995 - Initiated the independent operation of the Marketing and Supply and the Banking and Insurance divisions
- 1989 - Introduced a direct election system for the president of member cooperatives and the chairperson of the NACF
- 1986 - Began supplying tax-free oil for farm machinery and equipment
- 1985 - Launched an IT center equipped with 360 online networks
- 1984 - Launched annuity and fire insurance businesses
- 1984 - Launched credit card services
- 1981 - Restructured the 3-tier organization to a 2-tier organization, consisting of individual cooperatives and the federation
- 1969 - Launched the mutual credit business
- 1961 - Established the NACF, consolidating agricultural cooperatives and the Agricultural Bank in accordance with Agricultural Cooperative Law

== Member cooperatives ==
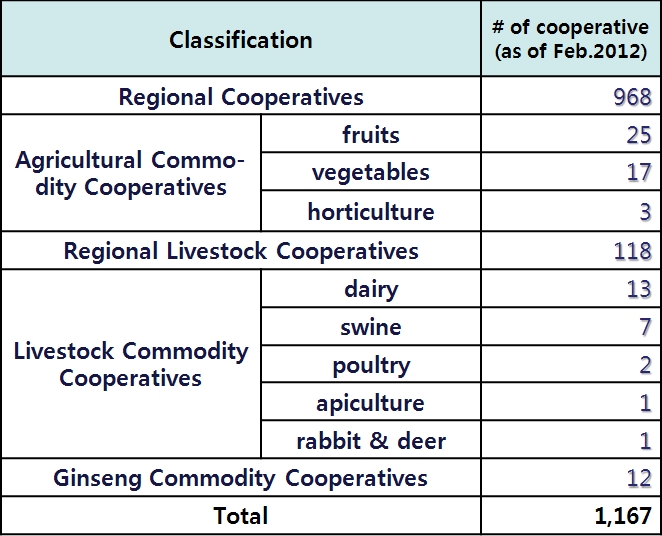
Number of member cooperatives as of February 2012

Member cooperatives are democratically controlled, autonomous business groups, funded by member subscriptions rather than government financial investment. They, in turn, fund the NACF through institutional subscriptions. Cooperatives are governed by directly elected presidents, who, in turn, elect a chairman of the federation.

=== Member farmers and associate members ===
Member cooperatives allow non-farmers, who have invested a certain amount of capital into the cooperative, to open tax-free bank accounts and access some services. However, whereas member farmers are defined as the genuine owners or stakeholders, associate members can only obtain limited access to or influence over the cooperative.

As of December 2011, the number of the member farmers was 2,446,836 and the number of the associate members was 15,262,611. In 2010, these figures were 2,447,765 and 14,483,532, respectively, indicating a decline in member farmers of 929, and an increase in associate members of 779,079.

=== Number of cooperatives ===
At the end of year 2011, the NACF comprised 1,167 head branches, alongside 3,306 cooperatives.

== Korean agriculture ==
Recent international agreements have affected South Korean agriculture and by extension the effectiveness of the NACF. These include the European Union–South Korea Free Trade Agreement, implemented in July 2011, and the Free trade agreement between the United States of America and the Republic of Korea, which took effect on 15 March 2012. Proposed agreements include the China–South Korea Free Trade Agreement, the official public hearing of which was held at the World Trade Center Seoul on 24 February 2012.

Concerns over free trade agreements are reflected in the uncertain trends in Korean agricultural production. Total production by the agricultural sector in 2011 was KRW 44.62 trillion, up by 7.1% from 2010 (KRW 41.68 trillion) and including an 8.5% increase in the livestock and dairy sector. Conversely, the Korea Rural Economic Institute (KREI) expects the total production of agricultural industries to decrease by 1.1% in 2012.

== Operational restructuring ==
On 2 March 2012, the NACF restructured its operations, establishing financial and marketing holding companies through the revised Agricultural Cooperative Law and a resolution of the board of directors on 2 February 2012. The new NACF performs as the center of the member cooperatives, governing the Extension and Support Unit, the Agricultural and Supply Business Unit, the Livestock Marketing and Supply Unit and the Cooperative Banking Unit.

=== Extension and support unit ===
The NACF supports the operations and management activities of member cooperatives by providing education and training for their members and working to promote the rights of farmers. It also provides investments to develop and promote new agricultural technologies and products.

=== Marketing and supply units ===
The NACF provides marketing support for the production, distribution, processing, and consumption of agricultural and livestock products, focusing particularly on increasing the income of farming households by expanding sales channels and reducing farming costs. This enables farmers to concentrate their efforts on farming.

=== Cooperative banking unit ===
The banking unit serves as an intermediary and facilitator, providing loan and deposit services for member cooperatives and engaging in other incidental businesses. As of 2011, the total deposit is KRW 209 trillion and the total loan volume is KRW 146 trillion.

== Subsidiaries and affiliated organizations ==
=== NongHyup Financial Group ===
Founded in 1961, NongHyup Financial Group was created from the merger of Agricultural Bank and Agricultural Federation. The objective of the financial holding company and its subsidiaries is to secure the funds and revenues necessary for the intrinsic activities of the NACF, and to provide differentiated banking services to its customers. The group provides financing, mortgages, personal lines of credit, corporate finance, real estate finance, and new technology finance services. It also offers life, property, and casualty insurance products.

- NH Nonghyup Bank Co., Ltd
- Nonghyup Life Insurance Co., Ltd
- Nonghyup Property & Casualty Insurance Co., Ltd
- NH-CA Asset Management Co., Ltd
- NH Nonghyup Investment & Securities Co., Ltd.
- NH Nonghyup Investment & Futures Co., Ltd.
- NH Capital Co., Ltd.

=== Marketing holding company ===
The objective of the marketing holding company and its subsidiaries is to vitalize the marketing and supply of agricultural and livestock products through advanced expertise and efficient product distribution.

- Korea Agricultural Cooperative Marketing Inc.
- Namhae Chemical Corporation
- Young Il Chemical Co., Ltd
- Nonghyup Hansamin, Ltd.
- Nonghyup Logistics Service, Inc.
- Korea Agricultural Cooperative Trading Co., Ltd.
- Agricultural Cooperative Pusan Kyongnam Marketing, Inc.
- Agricultural Cooperative Chungbuk Marketing Co., Ltd.
- Daejeon Agricultural Products Marketing Center Co., Ltd.
- Nonghyup-Agro, Inc.
- Samhyup Nongsan Co., Ltd.
- Nonghyup Feed, Inc.
- Nonghyup Moguchon, Inc.

== Controversies ==
In 2013, Rep. Bae Ki-woon (Minjoo) and monthly news magazine Sisa IN exposed NACF's unethical business practice of paying newspapers and other media outlets to run promo articles. Among the media outlets which received payment from NACF were newspapers Dong-A Ilbo (628.7 million won), JoongAng Ilbo (375 million won), Chosun Ilbo (56.6 million won), Kyunghyang Shinmun (33 million won) and Hankyoreh (12.5 million won), as well as news agency Yonhap News (132 million won) and news website OhmyNews (55 million won).

An NACF public relations employee, who requested anonymity, told The Korea Observer that it has paid media outlets in exchange for articles that promote the cooperative and its policies. The employee also said that NACF does not spend its money to bribe media organizations to stop publishing "negative" news against it.

== See also ==
- Agriculture in South Korea
- List of South Korean companies
- List of Banks in South Korea
- Economy of South Korea
- Nonghyup Bank
