= VND Index =

VND Index also known as the Trade Weighted Vietnam Dong Index, is a measure of the value of the Vietnamese đồng (VND) relative to majority of Vietnam's most significant trading partners.

== Methodology ==
In 2009, following regions whose currency has been selected into calculation of VND Index are: United States, China, Japan, Europe, Singapore, Taiwan, and South Korea. Those seven regions are chosen, whose currencies selected into the index, based on the value of their export and import to Vietnam:

Trading Partner	Export (bil USD) Y08	Import (bil USD) Y08	Index
US	12.00	2.60	16.67%
EU	10.50	8.20	19.60%
JP	8.6	8.2	17.31%
CN	4.57	15.60	18.70%
TW	1.39	8.3	8.7%
SG	2.60	9.35	11.04%
KR	1.8	6.87	7.98%
SUM	41.46	59.12	100%
(Source: Ministry of Industry & Trade of Vietnam, Woori CBV Securities Corporation)

- The index is computed as the geometric mean of the bilateral exchange rates of the included currencies.
- The weight assigned to the value of each currency in the calculation is based on trade data, and is updated annually (the value of the index itself is updated much more frequently than the weightings).

== Criteria ==
- Nominal VND Index: based on nominal exchange rates and calculated on monthly basic.
- Real VND Index: based on real exchange rates and calculated on daily basic.

Both real and nominal VND Indexes started 100 point in the beginning of 2009.

== See also ==
- Vietnam Investor Confidence Index
- Vietnam Consumer Confidence Index
- Vietnam Securities Indexes
- Vietnam Bond Indexes
- Woori CBV Securities Corporation
