= No One Can Stop Mr. Domino! =

1998 video game

- North American box art
- Developer: Artdink
- Publishers: JP: Artdink; EU: JVC Music Europe; NA: Acclaim Entertainment
- Director: Tomotsu Satō
- Producer: Masahisa Okamoto
- Programmer: Tatsuo Oku
- Artist: Shuji Kasai
- Composer: Shingo Murakami
- Platform: PlayStation
- Release: JP: January 8, 1998; EU: September 1998; NA: November 30, 1998
- Genres: Endless runner, Puzzle
- Mode: Single-player

No One Can Stop Mr. Domino! (Note: Known as Do Not Stop Domino-kun (ドミノ君をとめないで。, Domino-kun o Tomenaide.) in Japan) is a puzzle video game developed by Artdink and released for the PlayStation in 1998. The user controls one of five anthropomorphic dominoes, placing other dominoes in rows that will successfully topple while avoiding obstacles and working under a time limit.

== Gameplay ==
Gameplay screenshot

The game includes six stages: a casino, a grocery store, a family home, a local park, an amusement park, and a city. Each stage is set up like a racetrack as Mr. Domino will return to the starting point after each lap. The player can make as many laps as needed to clear a given stage. When the level is cleared, the player will proceed to the next stage.

Once a stage starts, Mr. Domino starts to run and will not stop running. To control Mr. Domino's speed and direction, the player dictates movement with the D-Pad. The characters that are not under the player's control will attempt to hinder the avatar's progress in ways such as throwing dice, turning on electrical wire, and making fruit appear out of nowhere, making the evasion of such obstacles a primary concern of the player.

A game element called a "trick tile" places the dominoes effectively by input of the Circle, X, Triangle, or Square button. This will place a domino on the current path. The player can continue to keep placing dominoes by holding down one of the aforementioned buttons.

When a full lap is completed around the stage and returned to where the first domino was laid, Mr. Domino will bump into the domino. The dominoes will begin an effect of inertia, and Mr. Domino will stand still while the dominoes are falling.

While active, Mr Domino's stamina will decrease. This is signified by Mr. Domino's body gradually darkening. If Mr. Domino's stamina is depleted, Mr. Domino will transform into an ordinary domino, and the game will end. This is prevented by encountering special Recovery Tiles that can recover Mr. Domino's stamina, but can only be used once for each tile.

The player clears a stage by activation of the required number of trick tiles for each stage. Score is increased by activating the trick tiles in a shorter time and in as long of a chain as possible. If the stage is cleared with a High Score, the player will be able to unlock new characters.

== Characters ==
- Mr. Domino is the titular character of the game, and one of the two characters that are selectable in the beginning. He runs at normal speed. At the end of his run, he jumps from the top of a building and turns into a normal domino once he hits the ground. A young woman can be seen walking as Mr. Domino falls. Eventually, she sees Mr. Domino in his normal form on the ground, picks him up and walks away with him.
- Miss Domino is the only other character available in the beginning of the game. While she has the same speed as Mr. Domino, Miss Domino moves by skipping rather than running. At the end of her run, she runs into a wall and turns into a normal domino upon impact. Mr. Domino sees this and does the same, turning himself into a normal domino, lying beside Miss Domino in her normal form.
- Bruce is a Domino with devil horns, unlocked by simply completing the game once. He is difficult to handle due to his fast running speed, and is thus for advanced players only. At the end of his run, he blows himself up into a normal domino, only for a crow to swoop him up and fly away with him.
- Pierre-Domino is a Domino with glasses, unlocked by setting a High Score for each stage. He is the opposite of Bruce, as he runs slowly and runs out of stamina quickly. At the end of his run, he falls over due to exhaustion and turns into a normal domino. The sky then rains on him.
- D△M•?0 is an alien-like Domino, unlocked by setting a High Score for each stage. While he is listed as of the unknown style, he is actually the fastest of all the characters. At the end of his run, he melts into a normal domino and a UFO beams him up before flying into space with him.

== Reception ==
Reception

Aggregate score
Aggregator	Score
GameRankings	71%

Review scores
Publication	Score
AllGame	4/5
Electronic Gaming Monthly	7.5/10 (Note: Two critics of Electronic Gaming Monthly gave the game each a score of 7/10, one gave it 8.5/10, and the other gave it 7.5.)
EP Daily	6/10
Famitsu	25/40
Game Informer	7.75/10
GameSpot	6.9/10
IGN	7.8/10
Next Generation	3/5
PlayStation Official Magazine – UK	8/10
Official U.S. PlayStation Magazine	3.5/5
PlayStation: The Official Magazine	3.5/5

The game received mixed reviews from critics upon release. In Japan, Famitsu gave it a score of 25 out of 40. Next Generation said that "for puzzle-savvy players, the combination of technique, luck, quirky surrealism, and clever designs in Mr. Domino gives the game just enough of a hook to incite addiction." GamePro said, "Though the one-false-move gameplay may turn off some puzzle fans, and the linear problem-solving makes it merely a solid renter, Mr. Domino's unique charms make it worth playing." (Note: GamePro gave the game three 4/5 scores for graphics, sound, and fun factor, and 3.5/5 for control.)
