= CVB =

CVB may refer to:

- Convention and Visitor Bureau, an American destination marketing organization in tourism
- Central Violations Bureau of the U.S. court system
- Camper Van Beethoven, an alternative rock band

== See also ==
- Cosmic neutrino background (CνB, where ν is the Greek letter nu), a relic of the big bang
