= VBC =

VBC may refer to:

- VBC-90, an armoured combat vehicle
- The VBC 88.3 FM, a radio station in Wellington, New Zealand
- Valencia BC, a Spanish basketball team
- Vesper Barge Club, an amateur rowing club in Philadelphia, Pennsylvania
- Victory Base Complex, a large Coalition Forces camp in Baghdad
- Village Building Convergence, a natural building and permaculture gathering
- Vitale Barberis Canonico, Italian fabric mill
- 4-Vinylbenzyl chloride, a chemical compound
- Von Braun Center, an indoor arena in Huntsville, Alabama
- Ventrobasal complex, a portion of the human brain
- Vitale Barberis Canonico, an Italian fabric mill established in 1663
- Vienna BioCenter, a life science research centre
