= NH Investment & Securities =

Security firm in Korea

NH Investment & Securities Co., Ltd.
- Native name: 엔에이치투자증권 주식회사
- Company type: Public
- Traded as: KRX: 005940
- Industry: Financial services
- Founded: 1969; 57 years ago
- Headquarters: Parc1 Tower, Seoul, South Korea
- Key people: Jeong Young-chae (CEO)
- Parent: NACF (NongHyup)
- Website: nhqv.com

NH Investment & Securities Co., Ltd. (NH I&S; Korean: 엔에이치투자증권 주식회사; RR: En Eichi Tuja Jeunggwon Jusik Hoesa) is one of the largest securities firms in Korea, offering a broad range of financial services, encompassing wealth management, investment banking, brokerage and merchant banking through 121 domestic branches and overseas subsidiaries.

== History ==
NH Investment & Securities was established in 1969 under the name Hanbo Securities. Formerly known as LG Investment and Securities Co., Ltd., in December 2014, the company was transferred to Woori Finance Holdings Co., Ltd. and merged with Woori Securities on April 1, 2005, changing its name to Woori Investment & Securities Co., Ltd. In June 2014, it was transferred to NongHyup Financial Group, and on December 31, 2014, it merged with NH NongHyup Securities and changed its name once again to NH Investment & Securities.

== See also ==
- National Agricultural Cooperative Federation
- NH Bank
