= Woori Financial Group =

South Korean company

Woori Financial Group Inc.

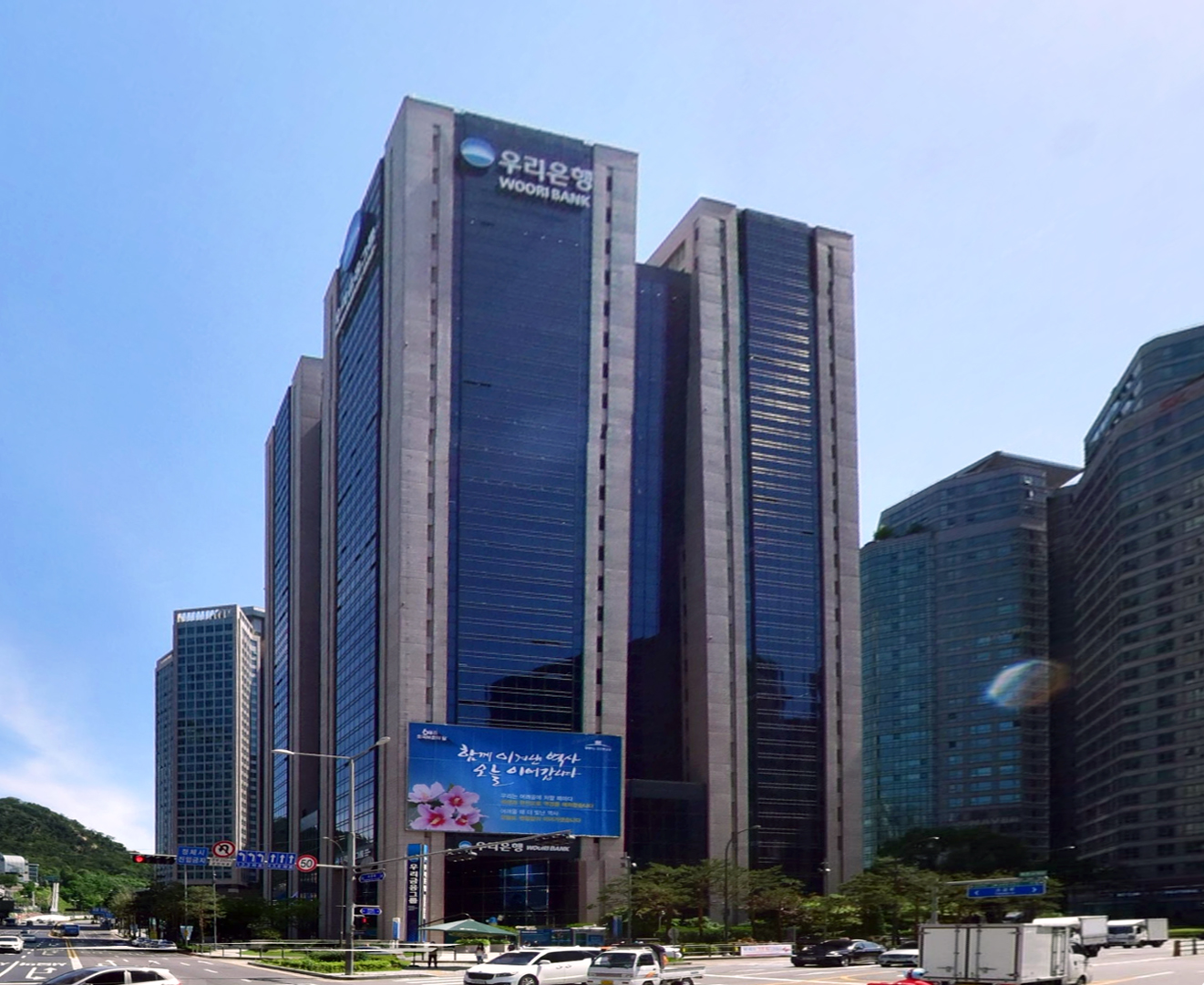
- Native name: 주식회사 우리금융지주
- Romanized name: Jusig Hoesa Uli Geumyung Jiju
- Type: Public
- Traded as: KRX: 316140; NYSE: WF
- Industry: Financial services
- Founded: January 11, 2019; 7 years ago
- Headquarters: Seoul, South Korea
- Key people: Lim Jong-ryong (CEO)
- Subsidiaries: Woori Bank
- Website: woorifg.com

Woori Financial Group (Korean: 우리금융지주) is a Seoul-based banking and financial services holding company and is the largest bank in South Korea.

As of May 2026, Woori Financial Group was South Korea’s fourth-largest financial services provider.

== History ==
Woori has had a relatively short history as a financial institution. It was formed in 2001 from the forced merger of four predecessor commercial banks and an investment bank: Hanvit, Peace, Kwangju and Kyongnam Banks and Hanaro Investment Banking and their subsidiaries. The banks were taken over and recapitalised by the government because they had fallen below the Basel I Accord-mandated eight percent capital adequacy ratio. The South Korean Government, through the Korean Deposit Insurance Corporation, remains the primary investor as a result.

This came about as a part of the 1997 Asian financial crisis, which affected the operations of virtually all banks and financial firms in South Korea.

== Subsidiary ==
- Woori Bank

== Operations ==
In 2014, Woori Financial Group sold then Woori Investment & Securities Co. to NongHyup Financial Group, which renamed it NH Investment & Securities Co.

In May 2024, Woori Financial acquired Korea Foss Securities Co., Korea’s largest online fund platform, as a means to re-enter the domestic services market 10 years after pulling out of it.

In May 2025, Woori Financial received approval from the Financial Services Commission (FSC), the country's financial regulator, for Woori Financial's takeovers of two life insurance companies—Tongyang Life Insurance Co. and ABL Life Insurance Co.—for a combined 1.54 trillion won (US$1.07 billion).

In August 2025, Woori Bank, a unit of Woori Financial, opened a branch in Austin, Texas, becoming the first Korean bank to establish a foothold in the city. This marked Woori’s third branch in the southern United States, following Dallas, Texas and Duluth, Georgia.

In December 2025, it was announced that chief executive officer (CEO) and chairman, Yim Jong-yong was set to secure a second term and begin a new three-year term in March 2026.

For the year 2025, South Korea’s four largest financial holding companies (KB Financial Group, Shinhan Financial Group, Hana Financial Group, and Woori Financial Group) reported a combined nearly 18 trillion won ($12.6 billion) in net profit. Specifically, Woori’s net profit rose 1.8% to 3.14 trillion won that year.

In March 2026, it was announced that Woori Financial was looking to sell its Digital Tower office building to bolster capital buffers following the Tongyang and ABL Life acquisitions.

== See also ==
- List of South Korean companies
- Woori Bank
