= Vietnam Consumer Confidence Index =

Vietnam Consumer Confidence Index (Vietnam CCI) is an indicator designed to measure consumer confidence of Vietnam, which is defined as the degree of optimism on their activities of savings and spending.

== Methodology ==
Each month Woori CBV Securities Corporation surveys nearly 1,000 Vietnamese households. The survey consists of five questions that ask the respondents' opinions about the following:

1. Family’s current financial conditions.
2. Family’s financial conditions for the next twelve months.
3. Business conditions for next twelve months.
4. Economy conditions for the next five years.
5. Family’s current purchasing condition.

== Crireria ==
- Vietnam Consumer Confidence Index-Vietnam CCI: the average of index values for five questions.
- Vietnam Consumer Present Condition Index-Vietnam CPCI: the average of index values for questions one and five.
- Vietnam Consumer Future Expectations Index-Vietnam CFEI: the average of index values for questions two, three and four.

== Level ==
- 200 point: everyone positive on all five measures.
- 100 point: neutral which means the consumer’s opinion is neither optimistic nor pessimistic.
- 0 point: all negative on all five measures.

== See also ==
- Vietnam Investor Confidence Index
- VND Index
- Vietnam Securities Indexes
- Vietnam Bond Indexes
- Woori CBV Securities Corporation
