= CBV Index =

Vietnamese stock index

The CBV-Index, or Corporates and Businesses of Vietnam Index, is a market index containing the stocks of 50 leading corporations of Vietnam. Subsets of this index include the CBV 10 (10 leading companies with highest total market capital and liquidity) and CBV 20 (top 20 such companies).

The CBV-Index, or CBV LargeCap, together with CBV MidCap and CBV SmallCap form the broader CBV Total. All stocks in these indices are traded on the two Vietnam stock markets, Ha Noi and Ho Chi Minh City Securities Trading Centers. It was created by BienViet Securities J.S.C., and first published on January 1, 2007.

== History ==
At the beginning of 2007, CBV-Index was introduced to the financial market of Vietnam by Bien Viet Securities. The Index was known as the first and only index that reflects the performance of the whole stock market of Vietnam, covering securities listed on the only two exchanges, Hanoi Securities Trading Center and Hochiminh Stock Exchange. Unlike indexes made by exchange houses as VN-Index and Hastc-Index, which are all market cap weighted, CBV Index was the first free-float market cap weighted index of Vietnam equity market. In March, 2007, CBV 20 and CBV 10 which form the part of CBV-Index was published in order to meet the demand for Index investors in Vietnam. CBV MidCap, CBV SmallCap for Mid-Cap and Small-Cap companies also came out at the same time. In April, 2007, the Council of Corporates and Businesses of Vietnam Indices was founded.

== Selection Criteria ==
The components of the CBV-Index are selected by its council. The council selects the companies in CBV-Index so that they meet the following criteria:

- The companies must be listed in either Hanoi and Ho Chi Minh stock exchange centres (HASTC and HOSTC)
- Large Market Capitalization: Total market capital of the company should be greater than 500,000,000,000 VND
- High liquidity: the ratio of annual dollar value traded to float adjusted market capitalization should be 0.4 or greater-Sector representative: Corporations are representatives of main economic sectors, sector balance is maintained.
- Types of corporations: Corporations must be operating companies; holding companies will not be listed in CBV-Index portfolio.

== Methodology ==
CBV-Index measures the change of average stock market prices using float adjusted market capitalization method.

The percentage of shares available for public investors- public float (IWF- Investable Weight Factor) will be calculated using the following formula:

:::{| style="vertical-aligne: middle; border-collapse: collapse; text-align: center" cellspacing=1

|rowspan="2" | IWF = | style="border-bottom: 1px solid black" | Number of shares available for public |- | style="border-top: 1px solid black" | total number of listed shares |}

Then, float adjusted market capitalization index will be calculated according to the following formula:

Index =	Σ_{i}P_{i}Q_{i}IWF_{i}
Index =	Divisor

Pi is market price of share i, Qi is the number of listed shares. IWF if the percentage of shares available for public investors, Divisor (D) is the index divisor. Divisor D will be adjusted so that CBV index will not be affected as the result of issuance of additional shares, addition of newly listed companies or removal of listed companies in CBV index.

== Components ==
List of CBV-Index Companies

== See also ==
- CBV Sectors
- CBV MidCap
- CBV SmallCap
- CBV Total
