= CBV Total =

Vietnamese stock market index

CBV Total is a stock market index indicating the performance of Vietnam's stock markets. It shows all stocks that are listed in the two Vietnam trading markets, the Hanoi Securities Trading Center and Hochiminh Stock Exchange.

It includes all stocks in CBV Index (or CBV LargeCap), CBV MidCap and CBV SmallCap.
