= CBV SmallCap =

Vietnamese stock market index

CBV SmallCap is a stock market index indicating the stock prices of 30 out of 73 small-size companies in Vietnam. The small-size companies are classified as those having total market capital from VND 50 billion to 150 billion with highest liquidity in this small-capitalization group.

CBV SmallCap, CBV MidCap, CBV Index form the broader CBV Total.
