= Vietnam Investor Confidence Index =

The Vietnam Investor Confidence Index measures the attitude of both Vietnamese local and foreign investors (investing into Vietnam stock market) to risk.

== History ==
The index is calculated monthly since January 2007 and developed by Woori CBV Securities Corporation.

== Methodology ==
- The index uses the principles of modern financial theory to model the underlying behavior of both domestic and foreign investors investing into Vietnam stock market. It is not survey based, but quantitative based.
- The index is weighted 50% towards selling and buying pattern of investors and 50% towards Vietnam equity market P/E ratio relative to 10 year Vietnamese Government Treasury yield.
- The index is calculated on monthly basic.

== Criteria ==
- Vietnam Domestic Investor Confidence Index
- Vietnam Foreign Investor Confidence Index

== Level ==
- 100 point: “neutral”.
- Above 100 point: “positive” (investors are increasing their allocations to equity assets).
- Below 100 point: “negative” (investors are reducing their allocations to equity assets).

== See also ==
- VND Index
- Vietnam Consumer Confidence Index
- Vietnam Securities Indexes
- Vietnam Bond Indexes
- Woori CBV Securities Corporation
