= NongHyup Bank =

South Korean agricultural bank

NongHyup Bank (NHBank)
- Native name: NH농협은행
- Type: Private
- Industry: Banking
- Founded: March 12, 2012; 14 years ago
- Headquarters: Seoul, South Korea
- Area served: South Korea
- Key people: Lee Seok-young (CEO)
- Revenue: KRW 17.837 trillion (2022)
- Operating income: KRW 2.78 trillion (2022)
- Net income: KRW 1.8 trillion (2022)
- Total assets: KRW 2.38 trillion (2022)
- Members: 16,186
- Number of employees: 16,163 (2022)

Korean name
- Hangul: 농협은행
- Hanja: 農協銀行
- RR: Nonghyeop eunhaeng
- MR: Nonghyŏp ŭnhaeng
- Website: www.nhbank.com

NongHyup Bank or NH Bank (Korean: 농협은행, SWIFT: NACFKRSE) is a specialized agricultural bank in South Korea and is in charge of financial services, headquartered in Jung-gu, Seoul, South Korea. The bank was established by the split-off of the credit and banking business from National Agricultural Cooperative Federation ("NACF") on March 2, 2012. It is now owned by the NongHyup Financial Group. The predecessor of NongHyup Bank started as Agricultural Bank established in 1907 as a financial association.

Unlike other major commercial Korean bank, NongHyup Bank is established with 100% domestic capital. NongHyup bank has 1,106 branches in domestic area, and 12 branches outside Korea, including New York, Beijing, Hanoi. It has the largest number of branches in Korea.

On 29 April 2021, NongHyup Bank was granted a Hong Kong banking licence.

== History ==
- 1907: Establishment of a financial association
- 1958: Agricultural Bank launched based on financial cooperatives
- 1961: Agricultural Bank and NongHyup were merged, and the urban branch of Agricultural Bank was separated into Small and Medium Business Bank.
- 2000: Merger of the National Agricultural Cooperative Federation, National Livestock Cooperative Federation, and National Ginseng Federation of Korea
- 2012: NongHyup National Association's credit business was separated into NH NongHyup Financial Group and launched as a subsidiary.

== See also ==
- Economy of South Korea
- List of Banks in South Korea
- National Agricultural Cooperative Federation
