= BVC =

BVC may refer to:

== Schools ==
- Bassingbourn Village College, a secondary school in Cambridgeshire, England
- Bishop Viard College, Kenepuru, Porirua, New Zealand
- Bottisham Village College, a secondary school in Cambridgeshire, England
- Bow Valley College, a post-secondary institution in Calgary, Alberta, Canada
- Bridgetown Vocational College, a secondary school in County Wexford, England

== Sports ==
- BVC Amsterdam, a Dutch football club
- Bay Valley Conference, an athletic conference of the California Community College Athletic Association
- Blanchard Valley Conference, a Northwest Ohio High School athletic conference

== Stock exchanges ==
- Caracas Stock Exchange (Bolsa de Valores de Caracas), Venezuela
- Colombia Stock Exchange (Bolsa de Valores de Colombia)
- Bolsa de Valores de Cabo Verde, a stock exchange in Cape Verde
- Bolsa de Valores de Colombia (bvc), a stock exchange in Colombia

== Transport ==
- The IATA-Code for Aristides Pereira International Airport, Boa Vista, Cabo Verde
- Bhavnagar Terminus railway station in Gujarat, India

== Other ==
- Bar Professional Training Course (the Bar Vocational Course pre-2010), a postgraduate course in England and Wales
- The British Vacuum Council, a professional organization in the United Kingdom
- Bushveldt Carbineers, an irregular unit in the 2nd Boer War
- (British) Virginia Company, an English trading company founded with the objective of colonizing the eastern coast of America.

== See also ==
- BVC '12, a football club from Beek, Netherlands
