= CBV MidCap =

Vietnamese stock market index

CBV MidCap is a stock market index indicating 30 out of 60 stock prices of medium-size companies in Vietnam. The medium-size companies are classified as those having total market capital from VND 150 billion to 500 billion with highest liquidity in these medium-capitalization group.

CBV MidCap, CBV SmallCap, CBV Index form the broader CBV Total.
