= Vietnam Bond Indexes =

Vietnam Bond Indexes (also known as HNX Vietnam Bond Index) are the first and currently the only indexes of Vietnam listed bond market. They are used as a benchmark to evaluate the market value of all Vietnam bonds.

== Vietnam Bond Index Structure ==
Created by Hanoi Stock Exchange, Vietnam Bond Indexes have following structure:

The Bond-Index is built based on treasury bonds, which account for 71 percent of the total value of listed Government bonds and are low-risk commodities, serving as a base for investors to assess other bonds in the market.

The Bond-Index includes general indices and those for bonds of different terms.

Following the Bond-Index, the HNX will develop indices for government-guaranteed bonds, local government bonds and bond liquidity.

HNX said that the Bond Index is expected to help improve information transparency in the bond market, support the Government in evaluating macro policies’ influence on the market and assist financial organisations in analysing, forecasting, studying and managing bond portfolios.

Currently, besides Bloomberg, Reuters also officially publishes "The indicators for Vietnam's government bond market" with the names of "VN Bond Yield Curve" and "VN Bond Index" for international investors.

1. Issuer:

- Vietnam State Treasury

2. Types of index:

- Vietnam Treasury Bond Index – Composite
- Vietnam Treasury Bond Index – 2 Year Treasury
- Vietnam Treasury Bond Index – 3 Year Treasury
- Vietnam Treasury Bond Index – 5 Year Treasury

== See also ==
- Vietnam Securities Indexes
- Vietnam Investor Confidence Index
- HNX Index
- Vietnam Consumer Confidence Index
