= Card reciprocal agreements =

List of credit and debit card network alliances

In order to expand the acceptance of their credit cards and debit cards, many networks, such as Discover, JCB, UnionPay, BC Card, RuPay and TROY create alliances with other networks.

== Existing reciprocal agreements ==
Brand	Accepted Wherever Displayed	Notes
American Express	JCB	
BC Card	Discover; JCB (Japan Only); UnionPay (China Only); RuPay (India Only)	Only BC Global Cards applied. Local BC Cards are not accepted outside South Korea.
Diners Club	Discover; JCB (Japan Only); RuPay (India Only); UnionPay (China Only); BC Card (South Korea Only); TROY (Turkey only)	Excludes United States & Canada issued cards, which are MasterCard cards.
Discover	Diners Club; JCB (Japan Only); RuPay (India Only); UnionPay (China Only); DinaCard (Serbia Only); BC Card (South Korea Only); TROY (Turkey only); Cabal (Argentina only); Elo (Brazil only)	Discover acceptance at Japan's JCB started in 2008.
JCB	Discover; Diners Club; UnionPay (China Only); RuPay (India Only); BC Card (South Korea Only); American Express	As of October 12, 2007, JCB Cards must be accepted anywhere Discover Network Cards are accepted in the United States, Puerto Rico, Guam and the Northern Mariana Islands.
Pulse	LINK (UK Only); UnionPay (China Only); RuPay (India Only)	Most ATM Networks in the U.S.
RuPay	Discover; Diners Club; Pulse; JCB (Japan Only); UnionPay (China Only); NETS (Singapore Only); Elo (Brazil Only); DinaCard (Serbia Only); BC Card (South Korea Only)	As of March 7, 2012, Discover Financial Services (DFS) and National Payments Corporation of India (NPCI) announced they have entered into a strategic alliance.
TROY	Diners Club; Discover	
UnionPay	Discover (Credit cards); Pulse (Debit cards); JCB (Japan Only); BC Card (South Korea Only); RuPay (India only)	As of November 1, 2007, UnionPay cards may be accepted where Discover Network cards are accepted in the United States, Canada, Mexico, Central America and the Caribbean.
