= Shinhan =

Shinhan may refer to:

- Shinhan Asset Management
- Shinhan Bank
- Shinhan Card
- Shinhan Financial Group
