= Ozan Elektronik Para =

Private bank based in Turkey

- Company type: Private company
- Industry: Financial Technology
- Founded: 2018; 8 years ago
- Headquarters: Istanbul, Turkey
- Key people: Özgür Gerçek (CEO, Board Member); Eren Kumcuoğlu (Chairman and COO); Cenk Küçükiravul (CPO)
- Services: Financial technologies, payment services, digital wallet
- Website: www.ozan.com

Ozan Elektronik Para is a Turkish bank specialising in electronic money services and payment technologies. It is licensed by the Banking Regulation and Supervision Agency of Turkey (BDDK), serving since January 2020 under the supervision of the Central Bank of the Republic of Turkey (TCMB) and holds memberships with major global payment networks, including Visa, Mastercard, UnionPay, BKM, and Troy.

== History ==
Ozan Elektronik Para was founded in May 2018 in Turkiye. In September 2019, the company obtained an E-Money "Issuing" License from BDDK. A year later, Ozan Elektronik Para received PCI-DSS Certification, ensuring compliance with global security standards for payment processing. In February 2021, the company became a Visa Principal Member and in May, it had gained UnionPay Membership. In July, it got Mastercard Principal Membership and joined BKM & Troy, the Turkish national payment network.

In June 2022, Ozan Elektronik Para secured an Acquiring License from BDDK, allowing it to offer merchant services, including payment processing and settlement solutions for businesses. In February 2023, the company became a member of BKM TechPOS, allowing include new payment functions. At the same year, Ozan Elektronik Para received two prestigious awards at the PSM Awards, recognizing its contributions to the financial technology sector. In February 2024, Ozan Elektronik Para joined the Mastercard Engage Partner Program.

== Overview ==
Ozan offers Virtual POS for secure online transactions and Physical POS terminals for in-store payments, with management through the FijiPOS platform. Its services include Dealer Collections for B2B networks and foreign currency collections supporting over 27 currencies . For individual there is SuperApp, a digital wallet for financial and lifestyle services, and the SuperCard, a prepaid contactless debit card.
