= WeChat Pay =

Mobile payment service in China

Weixin Pay
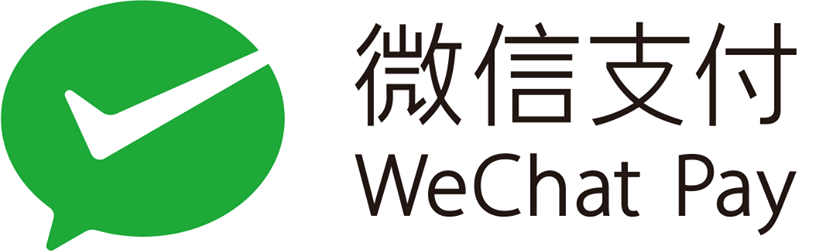
- Developer: WeChat
- Release: August 5, 2013; 13 years ago
- Operating system: Android iOS
- Platform: Android and iOS devices
- Website: pay.weixin.qq.com/index.php/public/wechatpay_en

WeChat Pay (Note: The mainland China version is also called Weixin Pay for differentiation.) (Chinese: 微信支付; pinyin: Wēixìn Zhīfù) is a mobile payment and digital wallet service by WeChat based in China that allows users to make mobile payments and online transactions. As of March 2016, WeChat Pay had over 300 million users. WeChat Pay reached 1.133 billion active users in 2023. WeChat Pay's main competitor in China and the market leader in online payments is Alibaba Group's Alipay. Alibaba company founder Jack Ma considered the red envelope feature to be a "Pearl Harbor moment", as it began to erode Alipay's historic dominance in the online payments industry in China, especially in peer-to-peer money transfer. The success prompted Alibaba to launch its own version of virtual red envelopes in its competing Laiwang service. Other competitors, Baidu Wallet and Sina Weibo, also launched similar features.

== Service ==
Users who have provided bank account information may use the app to pay bills, order goods and services, transfer money to other users, and pay in stores if the stores have a WeChat payment option. Vetted third parties, known as "official accounts", offer these services by developing lightweight "apps within the app". Users can link their Chinese bank accounts, as well as Visa, MasterCard and JCB.

WeChat Pay is a digital wallet service incorporated into WeChat, which allows users to perform mobile payments and send money between contacts. Now, WeChat Pay has six different payment products: Quick Payment, QR Code Payment, Mini Program Payment, Official Account Payment, In-APP Payment, and Web Payment.

Although users receive immediate notification of the transaction, the WeChat Pay system is not an instant payment instrument, because the funds transfer between counterparts is not immediate. The settlement time depends on the payment method chosen by the customer.

All WeChat users have their own WeChat Payment accounts. Users can acquire a balance by linking their WeChat account to their debit cards, or by receiving money from other users. For non-Chinese users of WeChat Pay, an additional identity verification process of providing a photo of a valid ID as well as oneself is required before certain functions of WeChat Pay become available. Users who link their credit card can only make payments to vendors, and cannot use this to top up WeChat balances. WeChat Pay can be used for digital payments, as well as payments from participating vendors.

=== Red envelope ===
In 2014, for Chinese New Year, WeChat introduced a feature for distributing virtual red envelopes, modelled after the Chinese tradition of exchanging packets of money among friends and family members during holidays. The feature allows users to send money to contacts and groups as gifts. When sent to groups, the money is distributed equally, or in random shares ("Lucky Money"). The feature was launched through a promotion during China Central Television (CCTV)'s heavily watched New Year's Gala, where viewers were instructed to shake their phones during the broadcast for a chance to win sponsored cash prizes from red envelopes. The red envelope feature significantly increased the adoption of WeChat Pay. According to the Wall Street Journal, 16 million red envelopes were sent in the first 24 hours of this new feature's launch. A month after its launch, WeChat Pay's user base expanded from 30 million to 100 million users, and 20 million red envelopes were distributed during the New Year holiday. In 2016, 3.2 billion red envelopes were sent over the holiday period, and 409,000 alone were sent at midnight on Chinese New Year.

== History ==
In 2016, WeChat started a service charge if users transferred cash from their WeChat wallet to their debit cards. On 1 March, WeChat payment stopped collecting fees for the transfer function. Starting from the same day, fees will be charged for withdrawals. Each user had a 1,000 Yuan (about US$150) free withdrawal limit. Further withdrawals of more than 1,000 Yuan were charged a 0.1 percent fee with a minimum of 0.1 Yuan per withdrawal. Other payment functions including red envelopes and transfers were still free. The new development comes in order to cover operating costs that are rising. When compared to WeChat on the basis of services charges, Alipay offered higher free limits. Currently, both platforms offer tiered limits with some small updates.

In 2019 it was reported that WeChat had overtaken Alibaba with 800 million active WeChat mobile payment users versus 520 million for Alibaba's Alipay. However Alibaba had a 54 per cent share of the Chinese mobile online payments market in 2017 compared to WeChat's 37 per cent share. In the same year, Tencent introduced "WeChat Pay HK", a payment service for users in Hong Kong. Transactions are carried out with the Hong Kong dollar. In 2019 it was reported that Chinese users can use WeChat Pay in 25 countries outside of China, including, Italy, South Africa and the UK. In the 2018 Berkshire Hathaway annual shareholders meeting, Charlie Munger identified WeChat as one of the few potential competitors to Visa, Mastercard and American Express. As of March 16, 2026, Alipay, a primary payment method for Alibaba's e-commerce sites is leading the online payment market in China. In February 2026 Alipay recorded over 726 million monthly active users in the country. Alipay holds about 53% market share with WeChat Pay at roughly 42% in China. Total mobile transaction volume reached an estimated $20.1 through Alipay in 2025. Combined they both account for around 90% of China's mobile payment market. WeChat total around 1.38 billion global monthly active users with the majority being in China.

In 2021, the mandate by the Ministry of Industry and Information Technology (MIIT) to open up the "walled garden" ecosystems of the major tech companies has led to the introduction of interoperability of payment QR codes of WeChat Pay and competing Alipay and UnionPay's Cloud QuickPass platforms. As a result of this, Alibaba's core marketplaces Taobao and Tmall including other Alibaba-owned platforms now use WeChat Pay as a checkout option.This includes food-delivery app Ele.me and the video-streaming service Youku as well as the online ticketing platform Damai which list WeChat Pay as a payment option alongside Alipay for payments.
