= Shinhan Card =

Korean credit card company

Shinhan Card Co. Ltd.
- Founded: 1990; 36 years ago
- Headquarters: Seoul, South Korea

Shinhan Card Co. Ltd. is Korea's biggest, global top-five credit card company. Headquartered in Seoul, South Korea, the company has a partnership with Shinhan Capital, and is an affiliate of Shinhan Financial Group. Shinhan Card was established in 1990, as a technical and business company licensed by Shinhan Bank. It introduced the technology of sending virtual one-time card numbers in Visa's 3-D Secure first in the world for its customers' security.

== Brand ==
Shinhan Card both issues credit card and check card and also operate under a BC Card license inherited from Chohung Bank.

In the United States, most card readers will accept as Debit Mastercard Credit, all debit cards are using Credit Card transaction system.

- Shinhan Card
  - Domestic Card; South Korean domestic transaction system only. Both Credit and Debit Card number starts with 9XXX.
  - Visa (includes domestic-only debit card)
    - Visa Electron
  - MasterCard
    - Maestro
  - JCB
  - URS (Domestic Credit Card only. JCB handles international transactions.)
- BC
  - BC South Korean domestic card
  - BC Visa
  - BC MasterCard
    - BC Maestro (debit card only)
  - BC JCB (credit card only)
  - BC CUP

== See also ==
- Economy of South Korea
- Shinhan Financial Group
- Shinhan Bank
- Namdaemun

== Homepage ==
- Shinhan Card Homepage
