= LG Card =

LG Card Co., Ltd. was South Korea's biggest credit card and consumer credit provider. It had nearly 7 million active customers. LG Card has no relationship with LG Group since 2004 except for the same corporate identity.

== Business ==
=== 2002 overleverage ===
In late 2002, a consumer credit boom reversed itself to a bust with millions of consumers falling behind on their debt payments. LG Card narrowly escaped bankruptcy in January 2004 after a $4.5 billion bailout. On Dec 31, 2004 the company's former owner LG Group agreed to inject $960 million into the company after its creditors agreed to provide 500 billion won ($480 million) and cut the interest rates on LG Card's existing debt by 2 percentage points from about 7.5 percent.

Creditors own 99.3 percent of LG Card after this year's bailout.

In December 2004 LG Card owes 12.6 trillion won in loans and debt securities, including 6.6 trillion won in uncollateralised debt.

LG Card was later merged into Shinhan Card in 2007.

== See also ==
- Shinhan Financial Group
- Economy of South Korea
- Korea Stock Exchange
