= Thomas Maheras =

American finance executive

Thomas G. Maheras
- Born: November 25, 1962 (age 63); Chicago, Illinois, United States
- Education: University of Notre Dame
- Occupation: Finance executive
- Known for: Executive Officer of Citi Markets and Banking during the 2008 financial crisis

Thomas (Tom) G. Maheras is an American finance executive that is currently a managing partner of Tegean Capital Management, LLC, a New York-based hedge fund.

Maheras became a figure of some controversy during the 2008 financial crisis, while being Co-Chief Executive Officer of Citigroup having a chummy relationship with Citi's risk managers as part of the problem that allowed for mortgage bond related risks to accumulate.

== Early life and education ==
Maheras was born in Chicago, Illinois, and received his Bachelor of Business Administration in Finance from the University of Notre Dame.

== Career ==
Maheras joined the high-yield desk at Salomon Brothers in 1984, shortly after graduating from Notre Dame. He ran the desk from 1989–1994, when he was asked to oversee the mortgage securities division. He became the head of the global fixed-income department in 1996. Maheras was widely credited with turning around Salomon's money-losing mortgage securities operation and became “one of the top two or three high-yield bond traders in all of Wall Street.

He was thought to be in a position to eventually lead the firm before its merger with Smith Barney.

Maheras became head of global fixed income for Salomon Brothers when it was acquired by Travelers Group in 1997, and remained in the same role through the merger of Travelers and Citicorp in 1998.

From 2004–2006, he was the head of Global Capital Markets at Citigroup. He then became Chairman and Co-Chief Executive Officer of Citi Markets and Banking (CMB), the investment banking division of Citigroup Inc..

=== 2008 financial crisis and Citibank mortgage bonds ===
Maheras became a figure of some controversy. Charles Gasparino, in his book on the 2008 financial crisis, portrays Maheras' overly chummy relationship with Citi's risk managers as part of the problem that allowed for mortgage bond related risks to accumulate.

When Maheras' superior at Citi, Charles Prince, learned of the size of Citi's exposure, he pressed for a restructuring of the IB operation that led to Maheras' departure.

=== Current position ===
He is currently chairman of the board of directors at Discover Financial Services in Riverwoods, Illinois. He is also a member of the Board of Trustees of Carnegie Hall and a member of the Business Advisory Council for the Mendoza College of Business at the University of Notre Dame.

== Other roles ==
Maheras served as Chairman of the U.S. Treasury Department Borrowing Advisory Committee for six years between 2001 and 2007 and was as an executive committee member of the Board of Directors of the Securities Industry and Financial Markets Association (SIFMA) in 2007.
