= UnionPay (application) =

Chinese mobile payment application

- Developer: UnionPay
- Initial release: 11 December 2017; 7 years ago
- Operating system: Android, iOS
- Available in: Chinese, Uyghur, English, Japanese and Korean
- License: Proprietary
- Website: yunshanfu.unionpay.com

UnionPay
- Simplified Chinese: 云闪付
- Traditional Chinese: 雲閃付
Transcriptions
Standard Mandarin
- Hanyu Pinyin: Yúnshǎnfù

The app of UnionPay (Chinese: 云闪付; pinyin: Yúnshǎnfù) is a mobile and online payment service, developed and operated by UnionPay, the national Chinese bank card clearing service. Launched in 2017, it was designed to compete with the existing third-party Chinese mobile payment platforms, Alibaba Group's Alipay and Tencent's WeChat Pay. The mobile app allows the user to add their UnionPay bank card, and use it for various types of online and mobile payments, including in-app online payments, QR code payments, as well as contactless payments on NFC-enabled devices using UnionPay's QuickPass feature.

== History ==
The UnionPay app was launched on 11 December 2017, which was merged from the old UnionPay app and UnionPay Wallet (Chinese: 银联钱包). Following that, the app has trailed in popularity behind its two major competitors, however, in 2021, the mandate by the Ministry of Industry and Information Technology (MIIT) to open up the "walled garden" ecosystems of the major tech companies, has allowed for increasing interoperability of payment QR codes of Alipay and WeChat Pay in the process ongoing throughout 2021 and 2022.

== Availability ==
The UnionPay app is available for the following:

- holders of the UnionPay cards issued in mainland China, Hong Kong and Macau;
- holders of the American Express renminbi cards issued in mainland China.

As of 2021, it can be used internationally in contactless "tap-and-go" mode with supported point of sale terminals in 51 countries and regions, and in 33 countries and regions in when the QR code "scan-and-go" mode is used.

== See also ==
- Remittance
- Payment gateway
- Payments as a service
- Ripple (payment protocol)
- List of on-line payment service providers
