= Discover Card =

Credit card

Discover
- Logo used since 2012
- Type: Subsidiary
- Industry: Financial services
- Genre: Credit card
- Founded: 1985; 41 years ago
- Founder: Sears
- Headquarters: United States
- Area served: United States (primary)
- Operating income: ▲US$3.6 billion (2016)
- Net income: ▲US$2.393 billion (2016)
- Parent: Dean Witter Reynolds (1985‍–‍1997); Morgan Stanley (1997‍–‍2007); Discover Financial (2007‍–‍2025); Capital One (2025‍–‍present)
- Website: discover.com

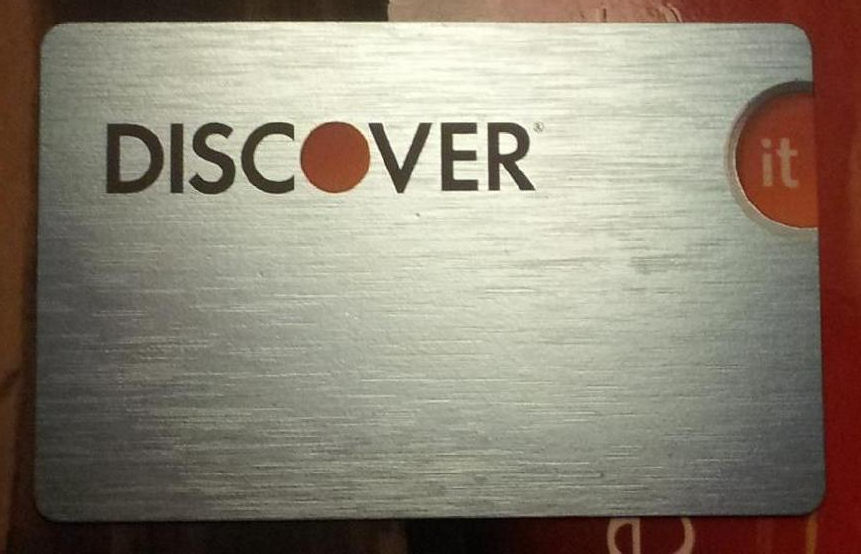
Discover it credit card

Discover is a brand of credit card issued primarily in the United States as well as a related payment system. Discover is accepted in 185 countries. It is notable as being one of the first cards not to charge an annual fee and to offer cash back. Originally offered to the public by retailer Sears in 1986, Discover is now a subsidiary of Capital One.

Discover is the third largest credit card brand in the United States, with 60.6 million cardholders or about 8% of cards in circulation, placing it well behind Visa (48%) and Mastercard (36%), but slightly ahead of American Express (7.5%).

== History ==
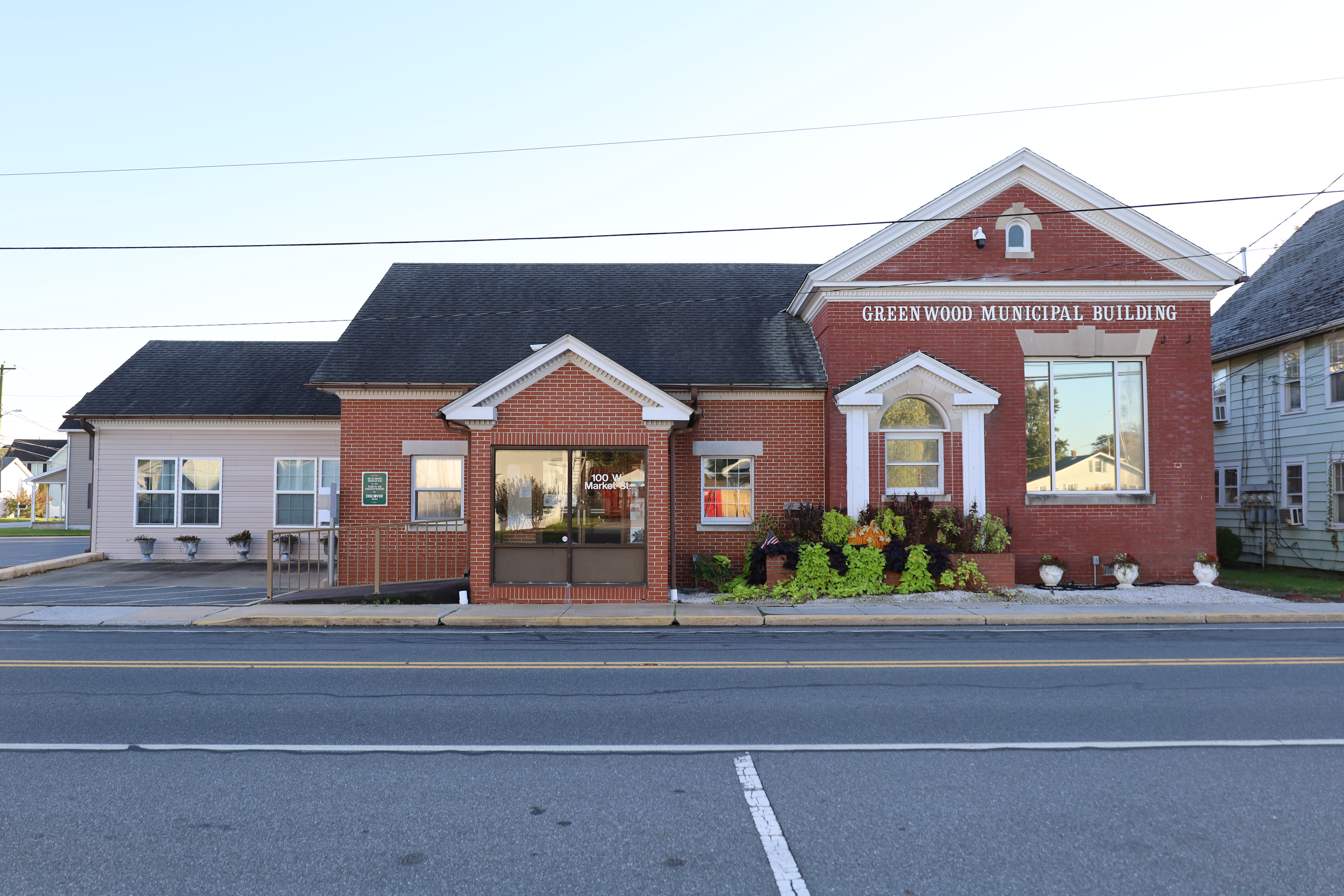
The original location of the Greenwood Trust Company in Greenwood, Delaware, now the Greenwood Municipal Building

At the time Discover was introduced, Sears was the largest retailer in the United States. It had purchased the Dean Witter Reynolds brokerage organization and Coldwell, Banker & Company (real estate) in 1981 as an attempt to add financial services to its portfolio of customer services. Ray Kennedy Sr., father of country singer Ray Kennedy and the credit manager for Sears, conceived the card. After a trial period in 1985, starting with a $26.77 purchase at an Atlanta Sears on September 17, the actual launch was pushed through by Philip J. Purcell and Mitchell M. Merin, the company's senior vice president for corporate administration and manager of financial analysis, respectively. Together with the Discover Card (and its issuing bank, the Greenwood Trust Company, owned by Sears), this was named the Sears Financial Network. Early Discover Cards bore a small embossed symbol representing the Sears Tower, then the company's headquarters.

Discover was part of Dean Witter, and then Morgan Stanley, until 2007, when Discover Financial Services became an independent company. Novus was once the major processing center that partnered with the company. The Novus logo was retired, replaced by the Discover Network logo.

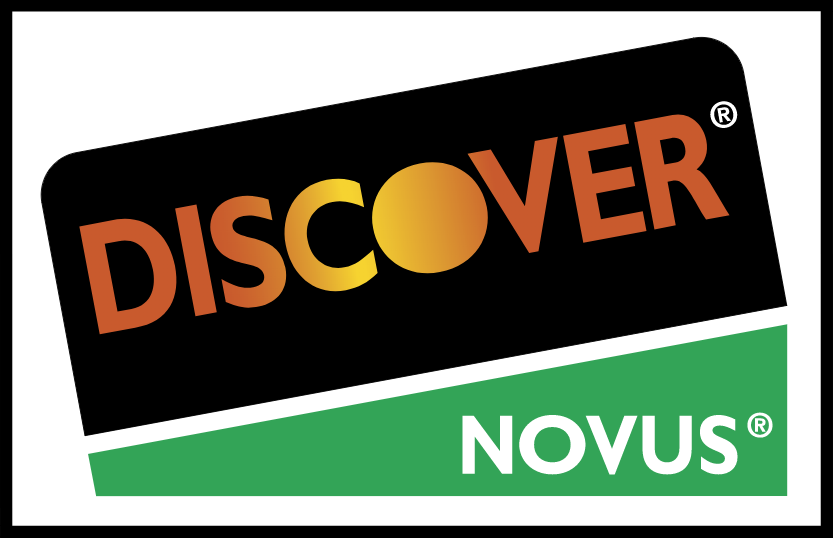
Discover and Novus retired acceptance mark

Unlike other attempts at creating a credit card to rival MasterCard and Visa, such as Citibank's Choice card, Discover gained a large national consumer base. It carried no annual fee, which was uncommon at the time, and offered a typically higher credit limit than similar cards. Cardholders could also earn a "Cashback Bonus", in which a percentage of the amount spent would be refunded to the account (from 1% to 5%), depending on how much the card was used. Discover was also noteworthy for being the only credit card accepted by the U.S. Customs Service to pay customs duty, effective February 19, 1987. Since it did not charge a percentage fee to retailers, unlike Visa, MasterCard, and American Express, Discover was also the only credit card accepted at Sam's Club; the retailer has since started to accept MasterCard and American Express (see below). A 1989 study found that Discover had strong consumer adoption in the U.S.; the number of households with Discover cards increased by 2.1 million, or 14 percent, in 1989. In this same year, Discover also signed a restaurant in Delaware as its 1 millionth merchant in its payment network.

The plan to create a one-stop financial-services center in Sears stores was not as successful as Sears had hoped, and its promotion of Discover was thought both to hurt Sears turnover and to restrict the card's potential. Other retailers resisted it, as they were developing their own credit products and they believed they would be helping their competitor. Sears began to face difficulties in the late 1980s in light of these developments, and with strong competition both from Walmart and from so-called category killers such as Toys "R" Us. Discover's introduction was costly; Sears's Discover credit card operations accounted for a loss of $22 million in the fourth quarter of 1986, and a loss of $25.8 million in the first quarter of 1987.

In 1993, Sears completed the corporate spin-off of its Dean Witter division into a new publicly traded company, and began to accept MasterCard and Visa in addition to its store credit card and Discover. Discover became part of the Dean Witter financial services firm, and the new company was called Dean Witter, Discover & Co. In 1997, this company merged with Morgan Stanley to become Morgan Stanley Dean Witter, Discover & Co. In 1999, this company rebranded itself as Discover Financial Services, Inc.

The Greenwood Trust Company was founded in 1911 and is based in Greenwood, Delaware. It was acquired by Discover Financial in 1985 and renamed Discover Bank in 2000. The original location of the Greenwood Trust Company on East Market Street in Greenwood is now the town hall and police station.

In October 2004, the Supreme Court of the United States upheld a ruling in Discover's favor that challenged exclusionary policies of Visa and MasterCard, stating that Mastercard and Visa were violating antitrust regulations with anticompetitive practices. Before this ruling, Visa and MasterCard would not allow banks to issue a Discover or American Express card if they issued a card by Visa or MasterCard. Within days of the court ruling, Discover filed a lawsuit in federal court seeking damages from Visa and MasterCard. In October 2008, DFS was awarded $2.75 billion in damages, the third largest settlement at the time in U.S. history. Shortly after the Supreme Court ruling, Discover struck its first deal to have its cards issued by another financial institution, GE Consumer Finance, which began to issue credit cards for retailer Walmart and its wholesale warehouse stores, Sam's Club. Transactions were processed on the Discover Network. Sam's Club exclusively accepted Discover for many years; since November 2006, it has also accepted MasterCard for purchases. In April 2014, Walmart ended its relationship with Discover. Walmart began converting all Discover-branded cards to Mastercard beginning in June 2014.

In January 2005, then-parent company Discover Financial acquired Pulse, an interbank electronic funds transfer payments network, for $311 million. The acquisition enabled the company to offer debit cards.

HSBC has issued Discover-branded credit cards processed through the Discover Network since its acquisition of card issuer Metris in late 2005. Metris had originally signed an agreement with Discover in September 2005, three months prior to the HSBC acquisition.

In September 2012, Discover was ordered to pay over $200 million in fines and customer reimbursements to settle accusations by U.S. federal regulators that it had engaged in deceptive telemarketing tactics.

In October 2025, merchants agreed to a $231.7 million settlement before a U.S. District Judge, as B & R Supermarket, Inc., et al v. Visa, Inc. et al, for costs imposed related to frauds involving counterfeit, lost, or stolen cards, with Discover agreeing to pay $12.2 million of the settlement.

In May 2025, Capital One acquired Discover Financial in an all-stock deal worth $35.3 billion, making it the largest credit card issuer in the U.S.

=== Card reciprocal agreements ===
Starting around 2005, to increase acceptance around the world, Discover has formed several agreements with other payment networks internationally. This allows Discover cardholders to perform transactions while traveling abroad. Vice versa, cardholders of other countries may utilize their cards at U.S. merchants that accept Discover. Some major examples include:

- Diners Club International worldwide
- BC Card in South Korea
- JCB in Japan
- RuPay in India
- TROY in Turkey
- UnionPay in China
- Verve in Nigeria
- DinaCard in Serbia
- Elo in Brazil
- ATH in Puerto Rico
- Mercury throughout the Middle East
- NAPAS in Vietnam
- Prosa in Mexico

== Advertising and sponsorships ==
Discover Card advertising (top right) on the boards of an NHL ice hockey rink during a playoff game

From 1998 to 2007, Discover Card owned a billboard at One Times Square, just above the flagpole where the Times Square Ball is placed and Discover sponsored the annual ball drop.

From its opening in 2001 to 2012, Sugarloaf Mills Mall in Lawrenceville, Georgia, was named Discover Mills in a $10 million naming rights partnership with Discover Card. The slogan for the mall was "Where Discover Card is the Smart Choice". It was the first shopping mall to have granted naming rights.

Beginning in 2010, Discover was the official credit-card partner of the National Hockey League.

In 2011 and 2012, Discover Card's float won the Grand Marshal award for excellence in creative concept and design in the Rose Parade in Pasadena.

From 2011 to 2013, Discover was the sponsor of the college football Orange Bowl. It was also the sponsor of the 2013 BCS National Championship Game.

In 2017, Discover was named the first ever presenting sponsor and official credit card of the Big Ten Football Championship Game as part of a multi-year sponsorship.

In 2024, actress Jennifer Coolidge starred in Discover Card's television commercials.
