= Mitchell M. Merin =

American business executive and banker (born 1953)

- Born: August 1953 (age 73); Hartford, Connecticut
- Education: Trinity College; Northwestern University
- Occupation: Financial Executive
- Known for: Former President and COO of Morgan Stanley Investment Management

Mitchell M. Merin (born August 1953) is an American business executive and banker who served as President and Chief Operating Officer of Morgan Stanley's investment management division (MSIM) from 1998 to 2005.

== Early life and education ==
Merin was born in August 1953 in Hartford, Connecticut. He earned a bachelor's degree in Economics from Trinity College in 1975 and an MBA in finance and accounting from Northwestern University in 1977.

== Early career and Dean Witter ==
Merin's first job was as an auditor for Touche Ross, at the time one of the Big Eight accounting firms. After working on the Sears account for Touche Ross, Merin joined Sears in May 1981 as a manager of financial analysis. While working on Sears' bid to acquire Dean Witter Reynolds, Merin met Philip Purcell in 1981, at the time Sears' senior vice president for corporate administration. Together, they launched the Discover Card in 1985, and when Purcell became CEO of Dean Witter in 1986 he quickly named Merin treasurer and gave him a mandate to serve as a liaison between Purcell and other Sears' executives.

In 1993 Dean Witter was spun off by Sears into a separate entity, and Purcell was made head of the new company. Purcell appointed Merin to key positions within the company, including chief administrative officer, chief strategist, executive vice president and chief administrative officer. Merin's final role within Dean Witter was to help oversee the 1997 merger of the company with Morgan Stanley.

== Career at Morgan Stanley ==
After the departure of James Allwin in December 1998 Merin was named president and Chief Operating Officer (COO) of the new Morgan Stanley Dean Witter's asset management division, despite the fact that Merin did not have a background in asset management. Because of Morgan Stanley's recent mergers and acquisitions, the firm contained four independently operating asset management units that had previously competed with one another and were reluctant to unify under the Morgan Stanley brand. Merin was tasked with unifying these operations, and by the end of 2000 had overseen a large increase in asset growth and a 10% reduction in expenses, making the division one of the firm's most profitable businesses by 2005.

Following the unification of these business divisions, Merin attempted to position the funds for more international growth, but encountered difficulty as personnel changes and poor market conditions limited the growth the division was able to achieve, and regulators took action against illegal fund sales and inappropriate incentivization of in-house funds.

== Exit from Morgan Stanley ==
Although a close ally of Purcell, and once considered a candidate to replace him as CEO of Morgan Stanley, Merin's frequent transitions between businesses limited his ability to build the alliances necessary to become CEO himself. Under pressure from Morgan Stanley shareholders, Merin announced his retirement in 2005. He was succeeded within the investment management division by Owen D. Thomas.

== Outside Morgan Stanley ==
Merin served on several boards and industry committees. He was Chairman of the National Association of Securities Dealers Investment Companies committee and Fixed Income Securities committee. In 2012 Merin was named a JPMorgan Chase fund board trustee, where he worked on the Audit and Valuation Committee, and chaired the Money Market and Alternative Products Committee. He also served as a Trustee of Trinity College, and chaired its audit committee.
