= BC Card =

Payment processing company

- Logo since 2009
- Native name: 비씨카드 주식회사
- Type: Subsidiary
- Industry: Financial services
- Founded: 1982; 44 years ago
- Headquarters: Seoul, South Korea
- Area served: Korea
- Key people: Dongmyun, Lee (CEO)
- Products: Credit cards Payment systems
- Operating income: 256,104,000,000 won
- Net income: 18,165,000,000 won
- Parent: KT (69.5%); Woori Bank (7.65%)
- Website: www.bccard.com

BC Card (Korean: 비씨카드) is a South Korean financial services company headquartered in Seoul. South Korea's largest payment processing company, it provides end-to-end payment services, primarily to financial institutions, as well as to local merchants through its subsidiary company Smartro; credit cards, debit cards and prepaid cards; local brand network operation under the brand of "BC"; card issuing BPO (Business Process Outsourcing) to financial institutions; as well as Internet commerce and mobile payment solutions.

== Global Payment Services ==
BC Card is a leading company in the Korean card industry and is growing into a global payment company. In 2008, when it established a local subsidiary in China, it launched a partnership with China's UnionPay, a state-owned payment processing company, and launched the BC-UnionPay "China Tong Card". Currently, BC Card is in charge of buying tickets (inbound) of foreign-issued UnionPay card in South Korea, so if a buyer uses a UnionPay card issued in China, the buyer's receipt will be stamped with BC Card.

== Scope of use ==
BC cards are mainly accepted in South Korea, but since all currently issued cards are dual-label cards, they can be used globally through the network of another card organization.

In mainland China, only Shanghai Pudong Development Bank's teller machines can accept all types of BC cards directly through the BC card network.

== Feature introduction ==
The services provided by BC Card include an end-to-end credit card business processing platform, covering credit card insurance, delivery, authorization, reimbursement, merchant management, payment and settlement. In other words, BC Card provides a complete set of credit card services. Customized market research and analysis, risk management, brand management, product development and marketing.

== Member companies ==
- Busan Bank
- Citibank Korea
- Daegu Bank
- KEB Hana Card
- Industrial Bank of Korea
- KB Kookmin Card
- Kyongnam Bank
- Kwangju Bank
- Jeju Bank
- Nonghyup
- Suhyup
- Shinhan Card
- Standard Chartered Korea
- Woori Card
- Korea Development Bank (not member, but issuer)
- K Bank (not member, but issuer)
- Korea Credit Union (not member, but issuer)
- Korea Federation of Community Credit Cooperatives (not member, but issuer)
- Korea Post (not member, but issuer)
- National Forestry Cooperative Federation (not member, but issuer)
- Korean Federation of Savings Banks (not member, but issuer)

== Brand ==
BC Cards are branded credit cards and check cards (aka debit cards).

- BC South Korean domestic card
  - BC Global (treated as Diners Club/Discover outside Korea, credit card (all issuers), check card (Issued by Wooricard, SC Bank only))
- BC Visa
- BC Master/Maestro
- BC JCB (Credit card only)
- BC CUP
- BC AMEX(Credit card only)
