= Diners Club International =

American payment card company

Diners Club International Ltd.
- Type: Subsidiary
- Industry: Payment card industry
- Founded: February 8, 1950; 76 years ago
- Founders: Frank X. McNamara; Ralph Schneider; Matty Simmons; Alfred S. Bloomingdale
- Headquarters: Riverwoods, Illinois, United States
- Area served: 45 countries
- Key people: Ricardo Leite
- Products: Charge and credit cards
- Parent: Capital One (payment network); Bank of Montreal (North American franchise)
- Website: www.dinersclub.com

Diners Club International Ltd. (DCI), founded as Diners Club, is a payment network owned by Capital One. Diners Club and its franchises are accepted in over 200 countries and territories. Card issuers operating in approximately 45 countries have exclusive individual licenses to issue cards on the Diners Club network in a given country.

The company was formed in 1950 by Frank X. McNamara, Ralph Schneider (1909–1964), Matty Simmons, and Alfred S. Bloomingdale. It was the first independent payment card company in the world, successfully establishing travel and entertainment (T&E) credit cards as a viable business. Citibank bought Diners Club in 1981, then sold it to Discover Financial in 2008. Capital One then acquired Discover Financial in 2025.

== History ==
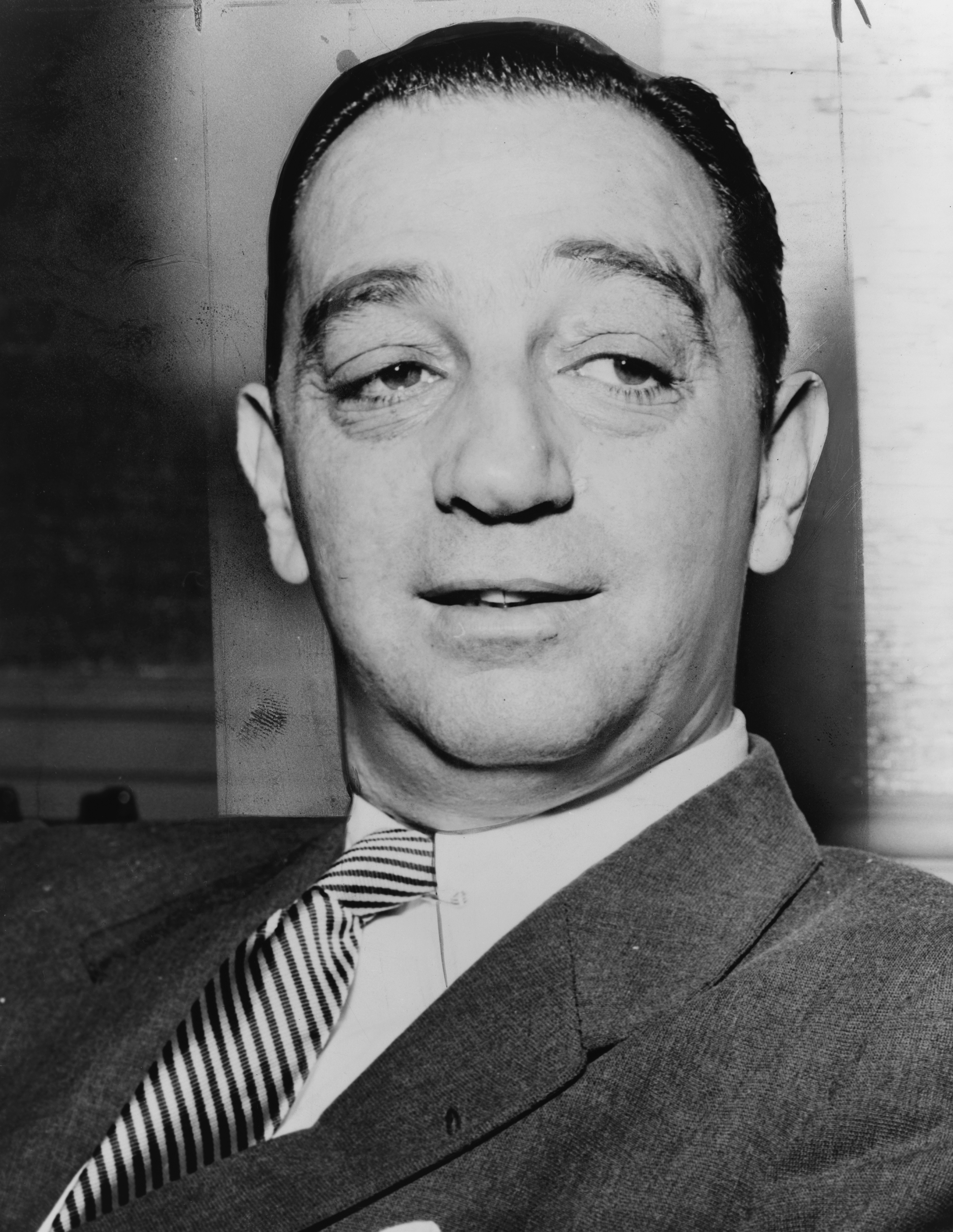
Portrait of Diners Club co-founder Ralph Schneider, pictured in 1958

The idea for Diners Club was conceived at the Majors Cabin Grill restaurant in New York City in 1949. Diners Club cofounder Frank McNamara was dining with clients and realized he had left his wallet in another suit. His wife paid the bill, and McNamara thought of a multipurpose charge card as a way to avoid similar embarrassments in the future. He discussed the idea with the restaurant owner at the table, and the following day with his lawyer Ralph Schneider and friend Alfred S. Bloomingdale. McNamara returned to the same restaurant the following February, in 1950, and paid for his meal using a cardboard charge card and a signature. The story became well known. Diners Club official history refers to this meal as "The First Supper", and is credited by historians as the beginnings of contemporary credit. Various versions of the story differ about whether it was a lunch or dinner at which McNamara forgot his wallet, and whether the bill was paid on loan or McNamara waited for his wife to drive his wallet to him. According to Diners Club press agent Matty Simmons, that never happened and the story was invented. Some journalists later credited Alfred Bloomingdale with the idea for Diners Club.

McNamara and his attorney, Ralph Schneider, founded Diners Club International on February 8, 1950, with $1.5 million in initial capital. Alfred Bloomingdale joined briefly, then started a competing venture in California before merging his California-based Dine and Sign with Diners Club. McNamara's original conception was to make a card that could be used as a means of payment in restaurants around New York City; however, he later expanded its usage to other types of establishments, including hotels, car rentals, and flower shops. The company started building its customer base by offering their cards to prominent businessmen. Shortly afterward, Matty Simmons, the company's first press agent, started advertising the card in newspapers, magazines, and by sending personal mail to potential customers. Diners Club International was named for being a "club of diners" that would allow patrons to settle their bill at the end of each month through their credit account. When the card was first introduced, Diners Club listed 27 participating restaurants, and 200 of the founders' friends and acquaintances used it.

Diners Club had 20,000 members by the end of 1950 and 42,000 by the end of 1951. At the time, the company was charging participating establishments 7% and billed cardholders $5 a year. In 1952, McNamara sold his interest in Diners Club to his partners for $200,000. The first plastic Diners Club card was introduced in 1961; by the mid-1960s, Diners Club had 1.3 million cardholders.

Towards the end of the 1960s, Diners Club faced competition from banks that issued revolving credit cards through Bank of America's BankAmericard (renamed Visa), and Interbank Master Charge (renamed MasterCard).

In 1981, Citibank, a unit of Citicorp, bought Diners Club International, including the franchisor that holds rights to the Diners Club trademark. Despite this, a majority of the franchises abroad remain independently owned.

In July 2008, Discover Financial acquired the Diners Club International network from Citigroup for $165 million. Capital One then acquired Discover Financial in 2025 in a $35.3 billion all-stock deal.

== Franchising ==
=== International franchise ===
In 2011, Discover began incorporating its logo on Diners Club International cards. Several payment processors, like PayPal, can process only new Diners Club International cards, which include the Discover logo, as well as BMO Bank's Diners Club-branded Mastercards issued in North America.

=== United States ===
In December 2009, Bank of Montreal acquired the franchise in North America from Citigroup.

New personal cards are no longer issued in the United States.

=== Argentina ===
Citibank licensed the Diners Club brand in Argentina to Banco Comafi from December 2013 until August 2021, after which Diners Club was no longer offered in Argentina.

=== Australia ===
In July 1974, Ansett Transport Industries purchased a 50% shareholding in the Australian franchise. In January 1999, Ansett sold its shareholding to Citigroup.

In 2012, as part of a financial reform program started the previous year to address government spending by public servants, the Australian government appointed Diners Club as the sole provider of credit cards for government travel services. Under the arrangement, Diners Club provided charge cards as travel cards to public servants (e.g. Defence Travel Card). Diners Club was also to supply an updated Expense Management System (EMS), to government agencies without one, or who wanted to upgrade their existing system. The new EMS would provide "timely, accurate and reliable” transactional data feeds for all card expenditure to agency finance or expense systems, allowing them to understand the nature of their travel expenditure, due to the “comprehensive data” that would be provided through the system from travel supplies. Diners Club provided Diners Club Travel Cards to government public servants with a companion Mastercard to increase the number of locations that accepted the card, to reduce cash advance withdrawals of travels allowances. After the Diners Club withdrawal from the Australian market, most government departments have adopted Visa for their card transactions.

In June 2022, National Australia Bank (NAB) acquired Citigroup's Consumer Banking business in Australia, including the Australian branch of Diners Club. The Diners Club Corporate Card, Citi Mastercard Corporate Executive Companion Card, Diners Club Business Card and the Citi Mastercard Business Companion Card previously marketed under the Citibank brand were brought under the NAB brand as a result of the acquisition.

In November 2023, Diners Club Australia announced that it was ending personal cards in January 2024, with no transactions possible after that date. Subsequently, it announced that all business and corporate cards were ending in April 2024. All Diners Club accounts were closed in September 2024, ending Diners Club's presence in the Australian market.

=== Brazil ===
In November 2018, it was announced that Diners Club International and Brazilian card association Elo were extending their partnership: they launched Elo Diners Club International Cards in Brazil. The cards run via the Discover Global Network, and are accepted at 42 million merchant locations and 2 million ATMs in over 190 countries and territories.

=== China and Hong Kong ===
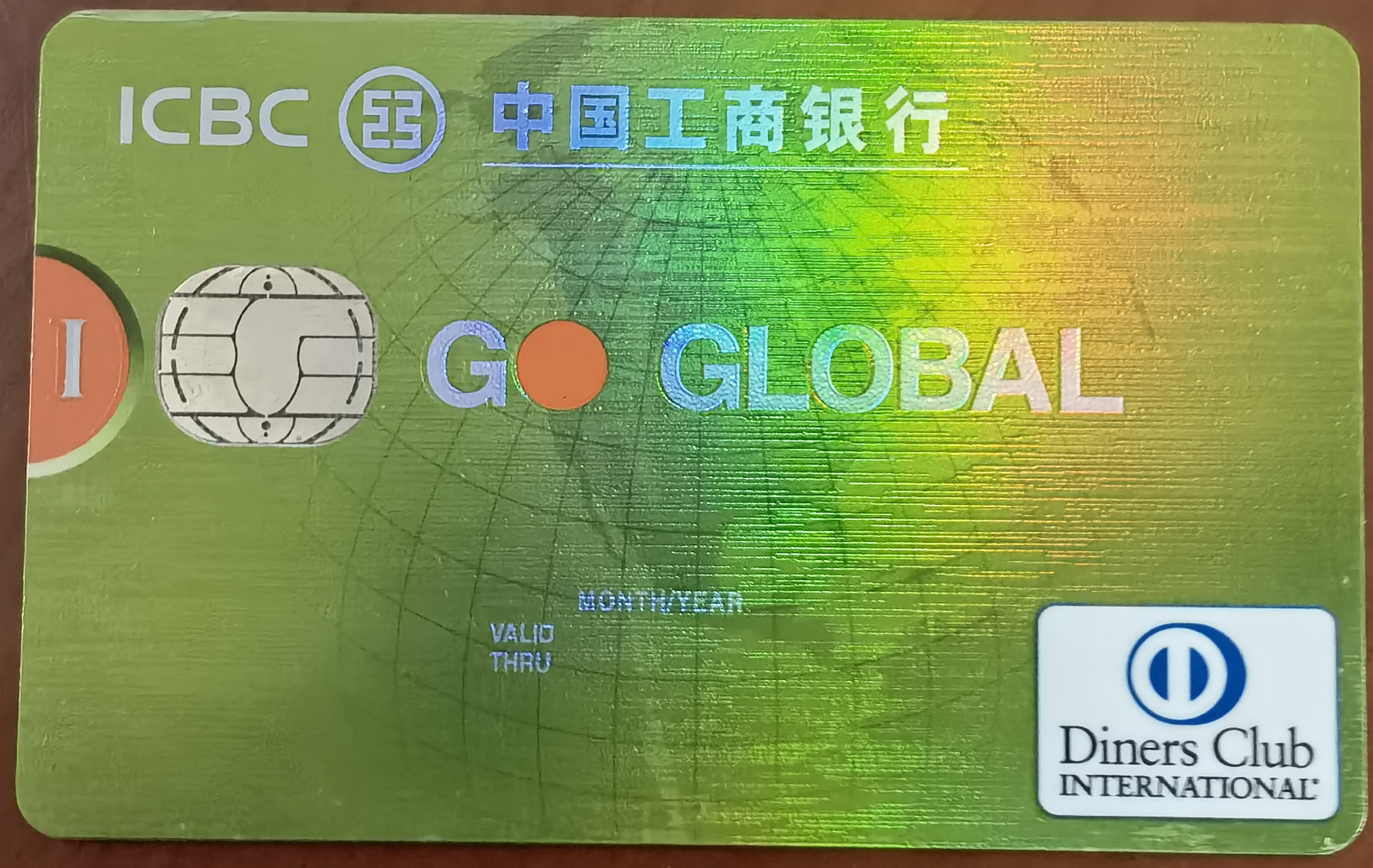
An ICBC Diners Club credit card issued in 2022. ICBC is the sole issuing institution of all Diners Club cards in mainland China.

In September 2017, Diners Club International signed a deal with Allinpay, a Chinese payment provider, to be the exclusive carrier of all the cards that are part of the Discover Global Network. Apart from that, Allinpay intended to increase the card acceptance in Hong Kong, especially by "travel oriented merchants".

=== Chile ===
In Chile, the Diners Club franchise was long held by Citibank Chile until it was acquired by Banco de Chile in 2008, who then took over said franchise.

=== Colombia ===
In Colombia, the first Diners Club franchise was opened in 1963.

In 2005, Davivienda gained the license to issue Diners Club in Colombia.

=== Europe ===
Diners Club has franchises in some European countries, such as Austria, Germany, North Macedonia, Slovenia, Spain, and Switzerland for example. Those franchises generally only issue Diners Club cards to residents of their respective countries.

However, since January 2025, ISX Financial has become a pan-European Diners Club franchisee, issuing the Flykk Diners Club debit card in several European markets.

=== India ===
Diners Club was the first to introduce credit cards in India. Kali Mody is credited with opening the first Diners franchise in the country in 1961, which started an invitation-only credit card issuance. Its cards have been offered by Citibank India, followed by HDFC Bank which took over in 2011.

In 2021, the Reserve Bank of India (RBI) barred the company (along with American Express) from issuing new cards for failing to follow norms about storing data within the country. The ban was lifted later in the year after it complied with the RBI guidelines.

=== Japan ===
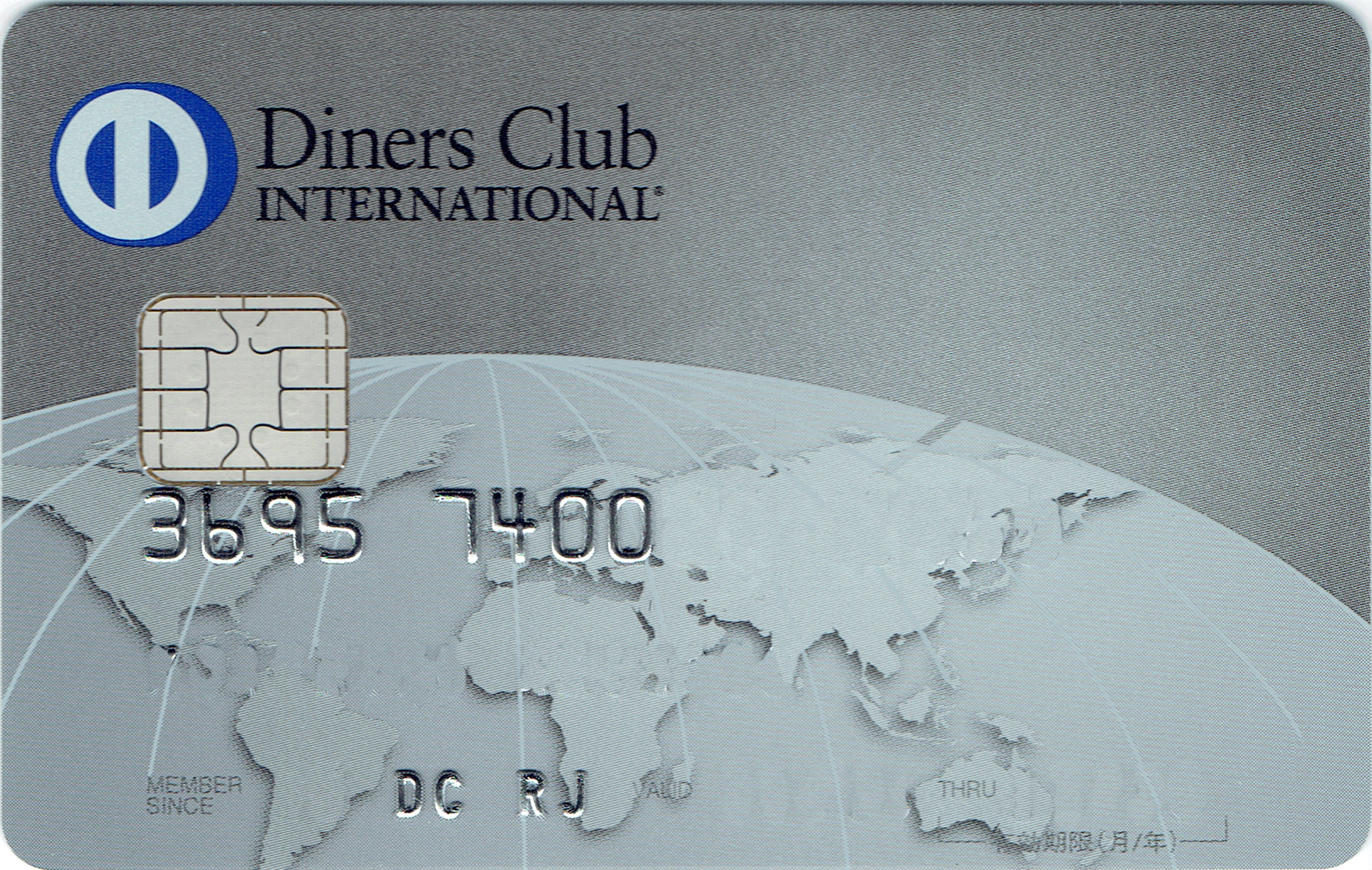
A Japanese Diners Club Card with IC card capability issued in 2016

The Nihon Kōtsū Kōsha (now JTB Corporation) and Fuji Bank (the direct predecessor of Mizuho Corporate Bank) founded Diners Club Japan in 1960, and began issuing the country's first Diners Club cards in spring 1961, shortly before JCB. In 2000, Diners Club Japan was acquired by Citibank Japan, and since 2015, the sole issuer of all Diners Club cards in Japan is Sumitomo Mitsui Trust Bank, after it acquired Citibank Japan's credit card division that same year.

=== Kazakhstan ===
In September 2016, Kazkommertsbank became the official Diners Club card issuer in Kazakhstan. In a statement, managing director of Kazkommertsbank, Nurlan Zhagiparov said, "Our collaboration with Diners Club is another step toward the integration of Kazakhstan into the global economy, which increases the tourism potential in our country."

=== South Korea ===
In South Korea, Diners Club started its business around the 1980s. However, in 1993, Citibank Korea sold Diners Club Korea to Daewoo Group, and after the acquisition by Daewoo Group, the parent company of Daewoo Motors, Diners Club Korea ran a successful business with sales of over 400 billion won. Diners Club Korea went through strict card issuance screening and solidified its position as a premium credit card in Korea. The number of Diners Club member stores increased more than tenfold, and the number of members reached hundreds of thousands, and the business was successful. However, Daewoo Group, which had acquired Diners Club, sold Diners Club Korea to Hyundai Motor Company after experiencing financial difficulties and starting a workout. Later, Diners Club Korea's name was changed to Hyundai Card, and Hyundai Motor Company began issuing Visa and MasterCard credit cards other than Diners Club to start a credit card business in earnest. Hyundai Card continued to maintain the exclusive license of Diners Club, but stopped issuing the card and discontinued the license contract with Diners Club because there was no benefit compared to the license fee. As a result, Hyundai Card was able to issue American Express cards and signed an exclusive license for American Express Card individual cards in Korea. Since then, Diners Club has signed a license contract with Korean credit card companies BC Card and Woori Card to issue Diners Club cards in Korea. In addition, Diners Club, which previously used Hyundai Card's payment network, began using BC Card's payment network in 2018. BC Card is a credit card company established by various Korean banks such as Citibank Korea and Woori Bank. Because it has contracts with almost all stores in Korea, Diners Club cards can be used at almost all stores and restaurants in Korea.

=== Nordic franchise ===
In the Nordic countries, the long-time franchisee was SEB Kort AB, a subsidiary of the Swedish bank Skandinaviska Enskilda Banken. SEB Kort closed the service in May 2019, citing increased competition and regulatory pressure in the Nordic payment card market, and the card is no longer issued in the Nordic countries.

=== North American franchise ===
==== MasterCard alliance ====
In 2004, Diners Club announced an agreement with Mastercard. Since 2004, all Diners Club cards issued in the United States and Canada (by Citibank until 2009, by BMO since) feature a Mastercard logo and 16-digit account number on the front and can be used wherever Mastercard is accepted. They are processed through the Mastercard network.

Initially, cards from other countries continued to bear a 14-digit account number on the front, with the Mastercard logo on the back. However, since the takeover of Diners Club International by Discover Financial Services, international cards have had the Discover logo on the back and the Diners Club International network is part of the Discover network. Since then, the only connection between Diners Club in North America and Diners Club International is BMO's continuous licensed use of the Diners Club brands, including Carte Blanche, on Mastercard credit cards.

==== Carte Blanche ====
Carte Blanche began in 1958 when the Hilton Hotels travel & entertainment card was renamed. Hilton sold Carte Blanche to First National City Bank in 1966. Regulatory challenges forced First National City Bank to sell Carte Blanche to Avco in 1968. In 1978, Citicorp (parent company of First National City Bank which was renamed Citibank) reacquired Carte Blanche without regulatory opposition. The 1960s- and 1970s-era Carte Blanche cards were considered more prestigious worldwide than their competition, the American Express and Diners Club cards, though its small cardmember base hindered its success. In 1981, Citicorp acquired the Diners Club card, and by the mid-1990s the Carte Blanche card was being phased out in favor of Diners Club. Parent company Citigroup was formed in 1998 with the merger of Citicorp and the Travelers Group. Citigroup issued a premium Diners Club card in 2000, naming it the Diners Club Carte Blanche card. It was an upper-level charge card on par with the American Express Platinum Card.

The Carte Blanche card in North America, now a branded Mastercard issued by BMO under its Diners Club International brand license, carried a US$300 annual fee as of April 2015 and offers an extensive menu of perks.

==== enRoute ====
Diners Club expanded its customer base in Canada by acquiring the enRoute credit card from Air Canada in 1992. It marketed the card under the combined name for a period of time as the "Diners Club/enRoute Card". The enRoute business was valued at over $300 million at the time of acquisition.

=== New Zealand ===
In 2014, The Warehouse Group acquired the New Zealand Diners Club franchise from its Malaysian owners and subsequently launched The Warehouse Group Financial Services on said basis. The Warehouse Group subsequently closed Diners Club NZ in 2018.

=== Russia ===
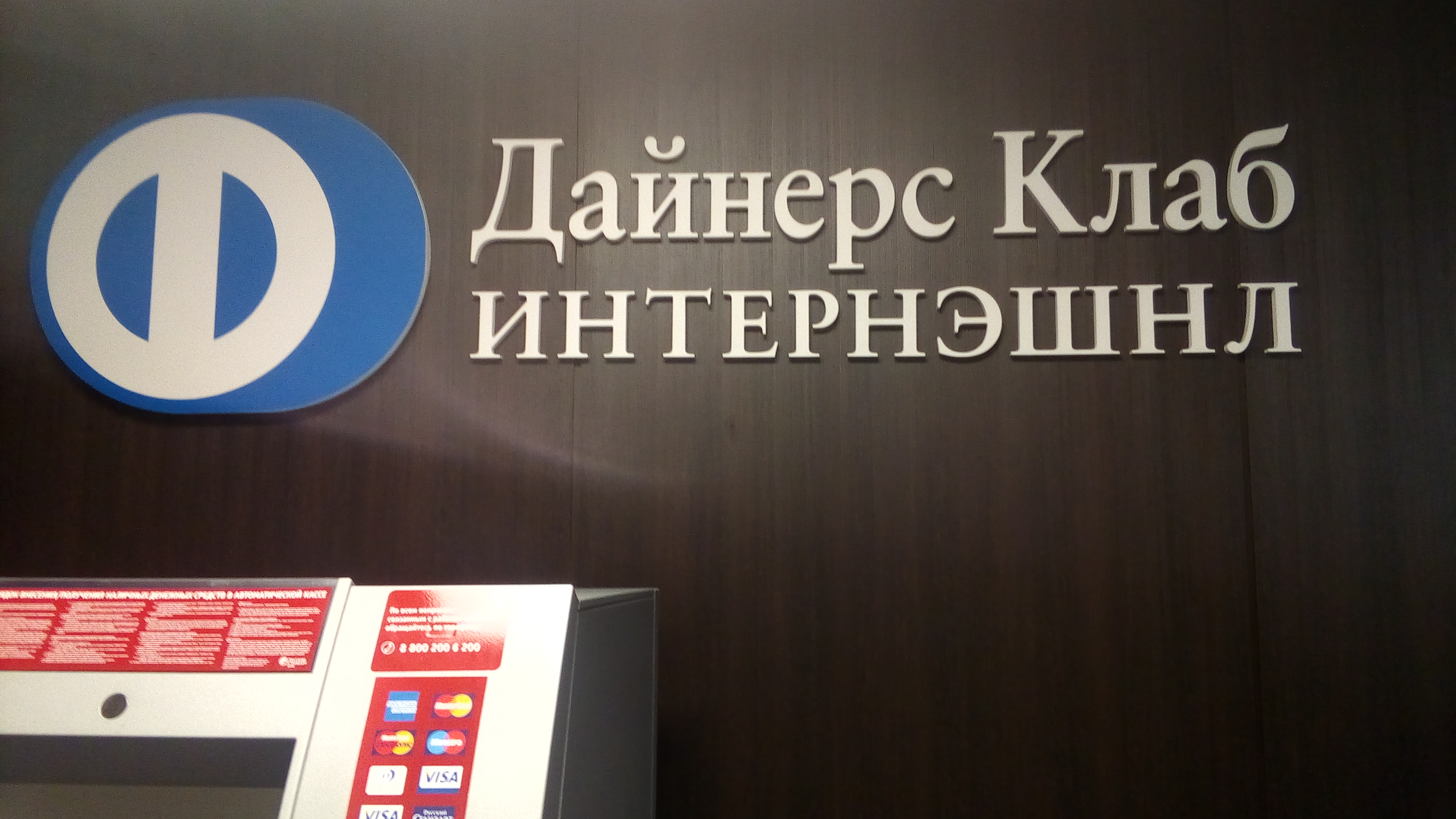
A Russian-language Diners Club sign in August 2016

In December 2010, Russian Standard Bank and Diners Club entered into an agreement to process transactions of acquirers for Diners Club and Discover. Foreign transactions were suspended in May 2021.

In March 2022, Diners Club, as well as Discover Card suspended all operations in Russia due to international sanctions during the Russian invasion of Ukraine.

=== Slovenia ===
In 2016, Tomaž Lovše, the former owned of Diners Club Slovenia, pled guilty to abuse of office. He allegedly used €22 million from Diners Club for his other dealings. In May 2013, the Central Bank of Slovenia revoked Diners Club Slovenia's license for payment services, which meant 80,000 local members could not use their card.

Diners Club International transferred the franchise to a subsidiary of Austria's Erste Bank group, Erste Card Club, and agreed to repay the franchise's debt to merchants.

Diners Club services were once again available in Slovenia in August 2013.

=== Southeast Asia ===
==== Malaysia and Singapore ====
Diners Club launched its Malaysian and Singaporean franchises in 1960. Its Malaysian franchise was terminated in 2015.

In December 2016, Diners Club International and 2C2P announced in a statement that the latter is a global provider of cards running on Discover Global Network and that it will increase the number of merchants who use the card in the region of South East Asia.

In 2023, the Diners Club Singaporean franchise renamed itself to DCS Card Centre and broadened its business to become a "fintech with heritage", as it aimed to become more than just an issuer of Diners Club cards in Singapore. In tandem with the rebranding, issued its first non-Diners Club credit cards, DCS Ultimate Platinum UnionPay Card, and its Mastercard counterpart of the same name. This effectively made it one of the only two Diners Club franchise companies to issue third-party payment network cards, the latter being Diners Club Ecuador.

==== Philippines ====
In October 1980, Diners Club entered into an exclusive franchise with Security Bank as exclusive franchisee of Diners Club in the Philippines through Security Diners International Corporation. In 2003, Security Diners International Corporation was renamed into SB Cards Corporation, as the bank diversified its product offering and entered into an agreement to carry Mastercard, alongside its Diners Club cards.

Security Bank renewed its network participation agreement with Diners Club in October 2013 which aimed to provide world class benefits of Diners Club in the Philippines through SBC. Turn of events suddenly changed the course of history in June 2016, Security Bank through its credit card division SB Cards Corporation sold Diners Club's exclusive rights in the Philippines to competitor and Philippines' leading banking conglomerate, BDO Unibank and in October of the same year, Diners Club International announced that they signed a deal with BDO Unibank to become the exclusive provider of the Diners Club in the Philippines. Security Bank at the time offered three tier cards: Blue (Classic), Platinum (named International), and Black (named Premiere). At present, BDO offers Platinum (International), and Black (Premiere) cards.

=== Spain ===
Diners Club Spain was founded in 1954 as the first credit card issuer in the country. In 2008, Banco Santander acquired 75% and AirPlus International the remaining 25% of Diners Club Spain. Banco Santander subsequently acquired AirPlus International's remaining stake in 2021.

=== Swiss, Austrian and German franchise ===
In August 2010, Citibank sold the Swiss and German franchises to a private investment group headed by Anthony J. Helbling. The Austrian and German Diners Club cards are issued by the Austrian DC Bank AG, while the Swiss Diners Club cards are issued by Cornèr Banca SA.

=== Turkey ===
Diners Club was brought to Turkey by Koç Holding for the first time in 1968 and been issued for a while. After a couple years without being distributed in Turkey, it was brought back to the country in 2016 by Alternatif Bank and as of September 2023, it is still being distributed by Alternatif Bank. Since 2019, the Diners Club cards in Turkey are being issued co-branded with TROY within a card reciprocal agreement, thus the acceptance of Diners Club and Discover cards throughout Turkey has been increased to full coverage. This agreement also provides TROY cards to be accepted on Discover/Diners Club network worldwide.

=== United Arab Emirates ===
Diners Club UAE, Egypt, Lebanon and Jordan is owned and operated by the Network International subsidiary of Emirates NBD Bank.

=== United Kingdom and Ireland franchise ===
In August 2012, Citigroup sold the Diners Club franchise in the United Kingdom and Ireland to Affiniture Cards, a private investor group.

=== Venezuela ===
Mercantil Banco is the sole franchisee of Diners Club in Venezuela since 1968.

=== Vietnam ===
In January 2018, Vietinbank entered into a partnership with Diners Club International to be the exclusive issuer of Diners Club cards in Vietnam.

== Sponsorships ==
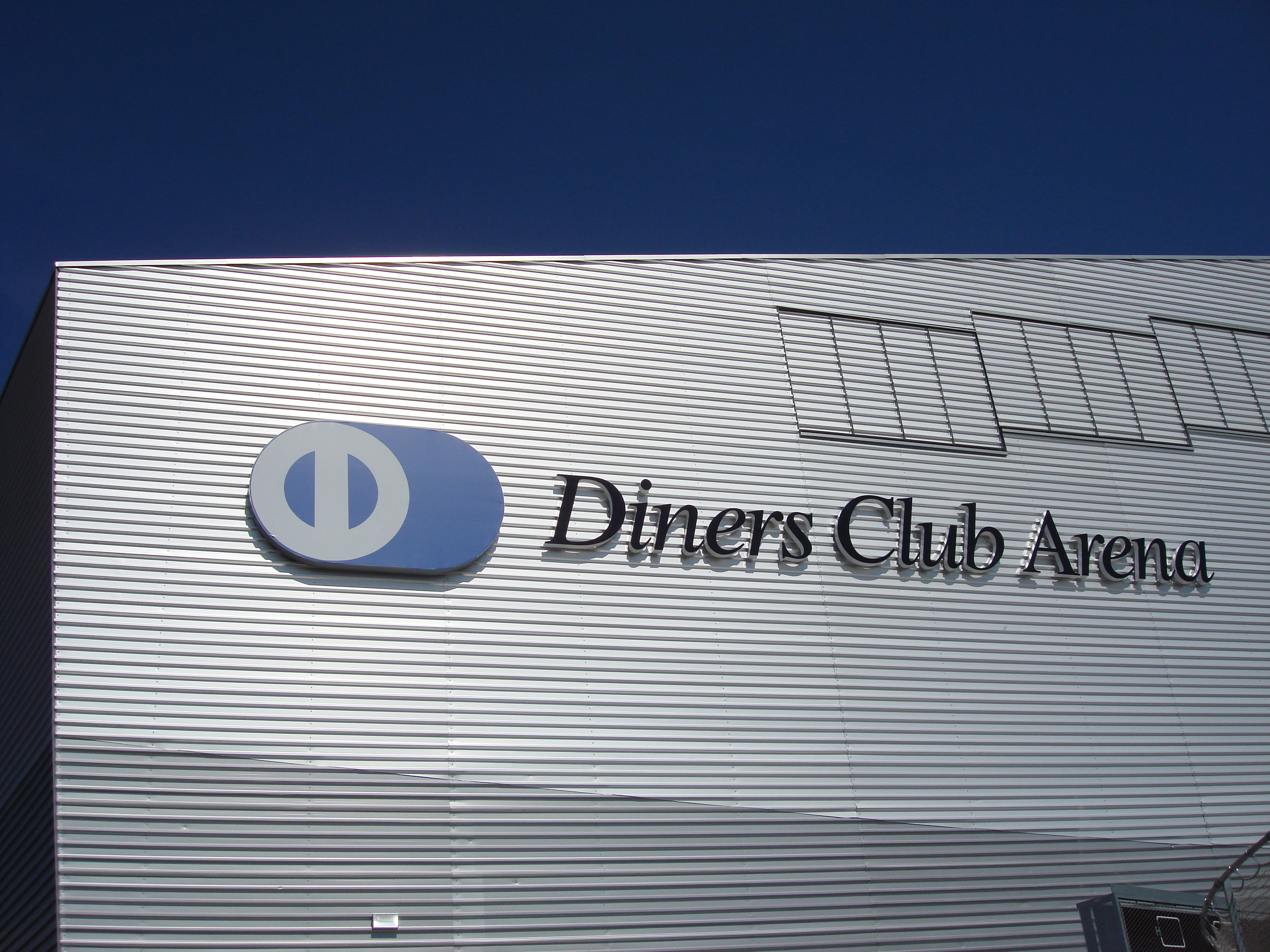
Diners Club Arena logo in April 2008

Diners Club International sponsored the St. Galler Kantonalbank Arena, then called the Diners Club Arena, in Rapperswil, Switzerland from 2005 until 2016.

== In popular culture ==
In Eric Ambler's 1959 novel, A Passage of Arms, the American character Greg Nilson has his "Diner's Club credit card" confiscated by Indonesian currency control officials in Sumatra.

In 1963, the film The Man from the Diners' Club was released.

The Ideal Toy Company created the board game titled The Diners' Club Credit Card Game in 1961.

In 1967, the film How to Succeed in Business Without Really Trying was released, incorporating the song "Brotherhood of Man" including the lyrics, "And other men may carry cards, as members of the Diners".

The Australian band Client Liaison feature Diners Club cards and logos in several of their retro-themed music videos.

In season 4 episode 4 of The Office, Dwight runs a bed and breakfast, and tells Jim and Pam that he takes only Mastercard and Diners Club.

In the movie Planes, Trains and Automobiles Del rents the car using Neil's Diners Club card. The card is shown melted on a motel front desk.
