= Virtual POS =

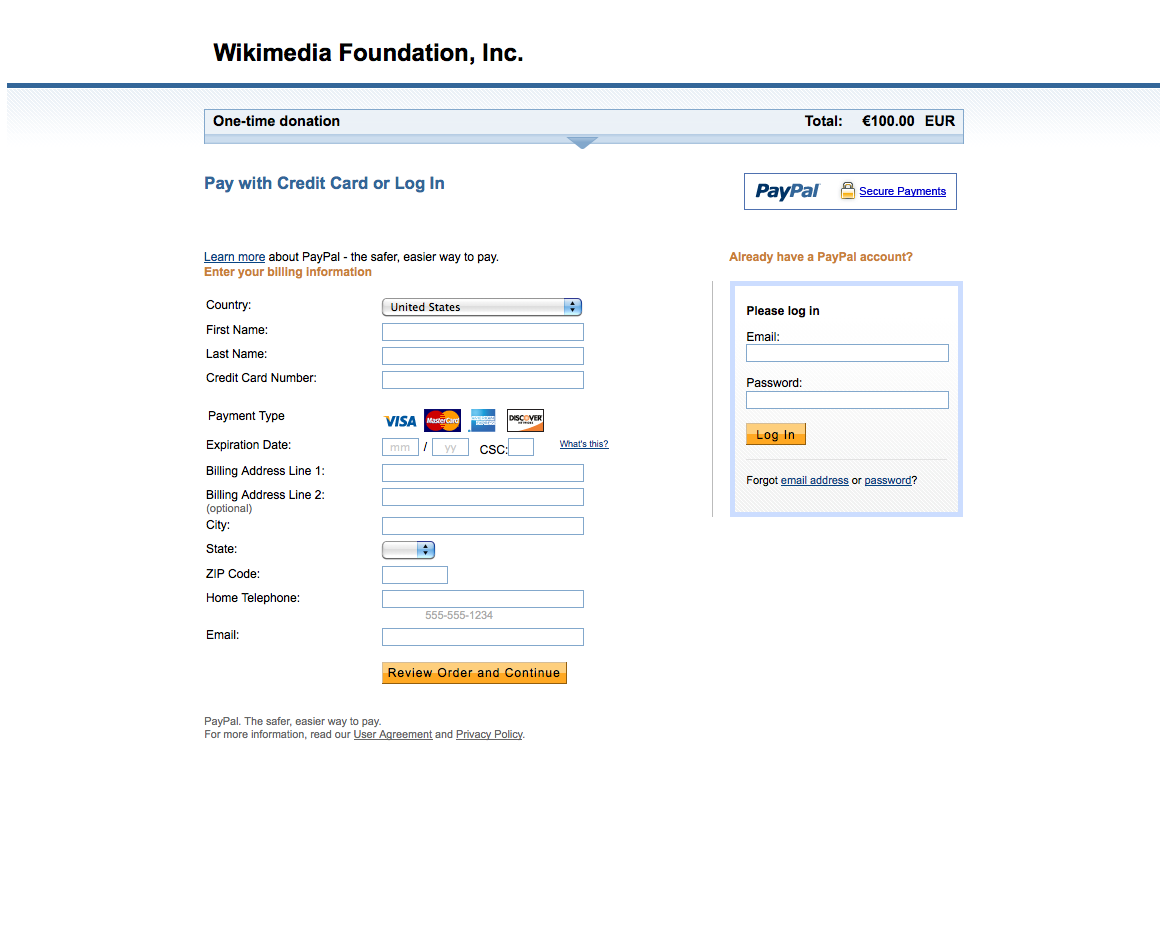
A 2010 screencap of a web page hosted by Wikimedia Foundation which allows for online donations. Card information entry pages such as this allow people to transfer money through the internet, and without the use of physical cash nor card readers.

A virtual point of sale (VPOS) is any software system which allows for the business transfer of money without the use of physical currency nor card readers. Online payment is increasingly common, especially since 2020 due to spending behavior changes occurring during the pandemic. According to the US Census Bureau, 16.2% of total retail sales in the first quarter of 2025 were through online e-commerce systems.

These systems are widely used across industries, from small businesses to global retailers.

== History ==
The use of the internet to sell products predates VPOS systems; customers would have to use non-digital payments to purchase things shown online. The first use of the internet to sell a product in a legitimate capacity was likely in 1994, with the sale of a CD by Sting via NetMarket. The transaction used encryption to send the customer's card information securely.

== Advantages ==
The use of a VPOS system can potentially benefit a business. Integration into a greater e-commerce arrangement allows for small business owners to engage in business entirely online, sidestepping a need for a physical presence. Etsy, a website with an emphasis on the sale of self-made crafts such as those created by self-employed artisans, reported having 8 million active sellers in 2024.

== Disadvantages ==
While online transactions are normally seen as extremely convenient, they possess some drawbacks compared to more conventional systems.

Using online resources to process card information can often incur a fee or penalty, which the merchant must pay on each transaction. For example, as of August 2025, commercial transfers between United States accounts using PayPal incur a fee between 2.29% and 4.99%.

The use of the internet to transfer card information also invokes a significant cybersecurity risk.
