= Shinhan Asset Management =

Korean Asset Management Company

Shinhan Asset Management Co. Ltd
- Native name: 신한자산운용
- Type: Subsidiary
- Industry: Asset Management
- Founded: 1996
- Headquarters: Seoul, South Korea
- AUM: US$77.8 billion (2022)
- Parent: Shinhan Financial Group
- Website: www.shinhanfund.com

Shinhan Asset Management (Korean: 신한자산운용) is an asset management company headquartered in Seoul, South Korea. It is one of the largest asset management companies in South Korea, with US$55.6 billion of assets under management as of end of 2020. It is a subsidiary of the Shinhan Financial Group.

== Overview ==
The firm was established in 1996 as Shinhan Investment Trust Management. In 2002 it became a joint venture between South Korea's largest group, Shinhan Financial Group and the French bank, BNP Paribas. The resulting company was named 'Shinhan BNP Paribas Asset Management' where Shinhan Financial Group and BNP Paribas held 65% and 35% of the company respectively. In January 2021, Shinhan Financial Group acquired the 35% stake of BNP Paribas in the joint venture making it a wholly owned subsidiary. As a result, the "BNP Paribas" part was dropped from its name.

== Brief history ==
- 1982/07: Establishment of Shinhan Bank
- 1996/08: Foundation of Shinhan Investment Trust Management with a capital of ₩30bn.
- 1999/01: The total Assets Under Management (AUM) reach ₩10,000bn.
- 2000/06: The capital is increased of ₩10bn.
- 2002/10: BNP Paribas acquires 50% of Shinhan Investment Trust Management. The name is changed to Shinhan BNP Paribas Investment Trust Management.
- 2005/10: Appointment of a new CEO, Jean Audibert.
- 2006/04: Shinhan Bank becomes the majority owner of SH Asset Management.
- 2007/12: Shinhan Bank owns 100% of SH Asset Management.
- 2008/09: MOU between Shinhan Financial Group and BNP Paribas was reached to establish a joint asset management company.
- 2009/01: Shinhan BNP Paribas Asset Management (Shinhan Financial Group 65%, BNP Paribas Group 35%)
- 2010/08: Established Shinhan BNPP HK office with Type 4&9 licenses regulated by SFC.
- 2011/12: Launched Industry's first Hedge Fund, Myongjang APAC Equity L/S.
- 2013/10: Launched Industry's third Korean Equity Long/Short Fund.
- 2014/02: Launched Industry's first Korean Asia Long/Short Fund.
- 2014/10: First Korean AMC to Gain RQFII quota.
- 2015/01: Launch of China Mainland RQFII Fund.
- 2021/01: Establishment of Shinhan Asset Management Co. Ltd after Shinhan Financial acquires BNP Paribas' stake in joint venture

== Product and services ==
Shinhan Asset Management offers a wide range of products, including :

- fixed income products,
- domestic equities products,
- hybrid products,
- Money Market Fund products (MMF)
- derivative products,
- overseas equities products
