= UnionPay =

Chinese financial services company

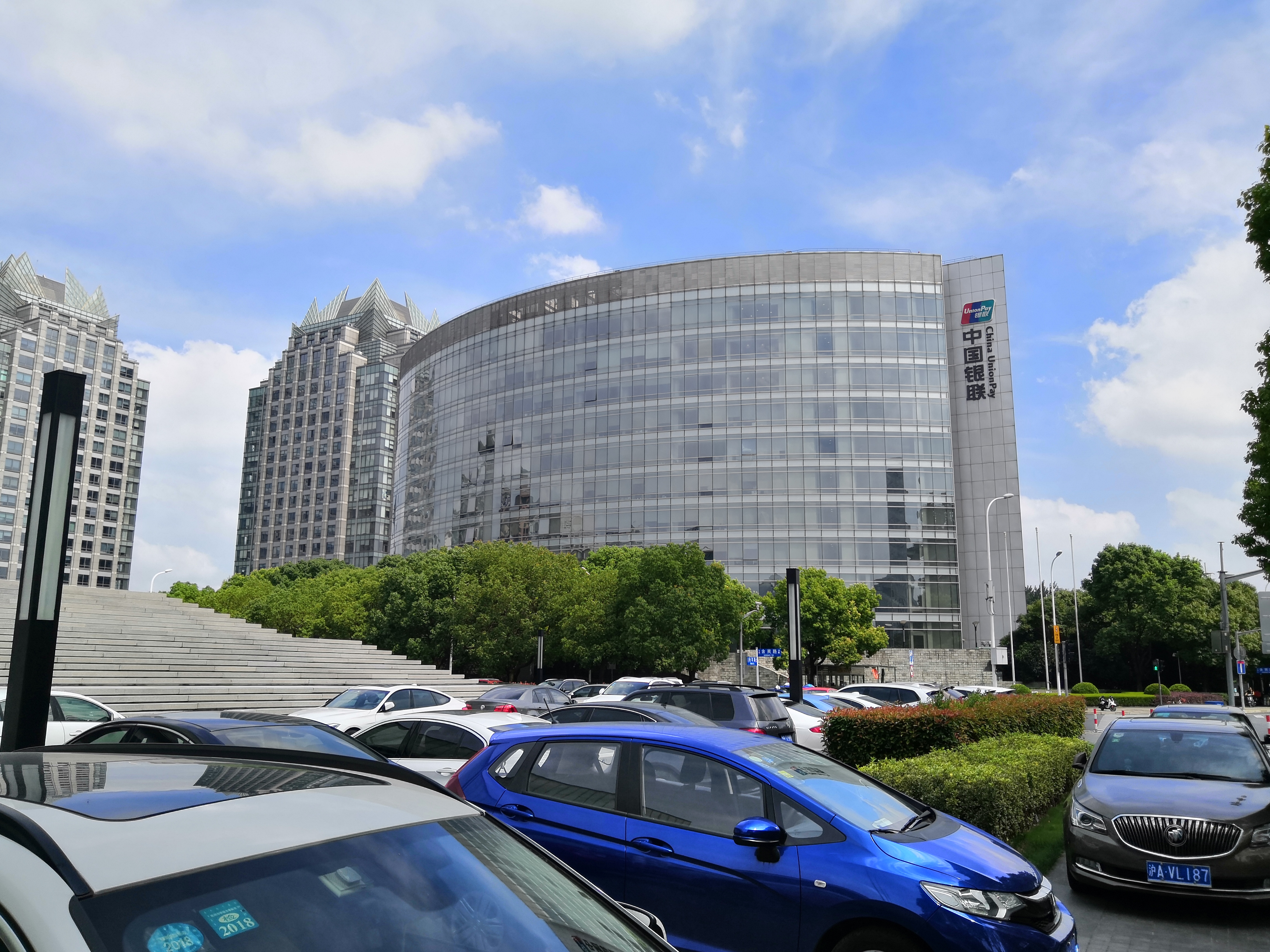
- UnionPay Headquarters (Shanghai)
- Native name: 银联 (Yínlián)
- Type: State-owned
- Industry: Financial services
- Founded: 2002; 24 years ago
- Headquarters: Pudong, Shanghai, China
- Area served: Worldwide
- Key people: Shi Wenchao (president)
- Products: Payment systems Credit cards
- Owner: China Telecommunications Corporation (0.021%); People's Bank of China (0.17%)
- Number of employees: 559 (UnionPay International)
- Website: unionpayintl.com

Countries where the UnionPay payment system operates

UnionPay (Chinese: 银联; pinyin: Yínlián), also known as China UnionPay (Chinese: 中国银联; pinyin: Zhōngguó Yínlián) or by its abbreviation, CUP or UPI internationally, is a Chinese state-owned financial services corporation headquartered in Shanghai, China. It provides bank card services and a major card scheme in mainland China. Founded on 26 March 2002, China UnionPay is an association for China's banking card industry, operating jointly owned by China Telecommunications Corporation and People's Bank of China (PBOC, central bank of China). It is also an electronic funds transfer at point of sale (EFTPOS) network, and the only interbank network in China that links all the automatic teller machine (ATMs) of all banks throughout the country. UnionPay claims that their cards can be used in "183 countries and regions around the world".

In 2015, the UnionPay overtook Visa and Mastercard in total value of payments made by customers and became the largest card payment processing organization (debit and credit cards combined) in the world surpassing the two. In 2025, around 43% of UnionPay transactions occurred outside China comparing to only 0.5% in 2015.

UnionPay offers mobile and online payments services.

== History ==
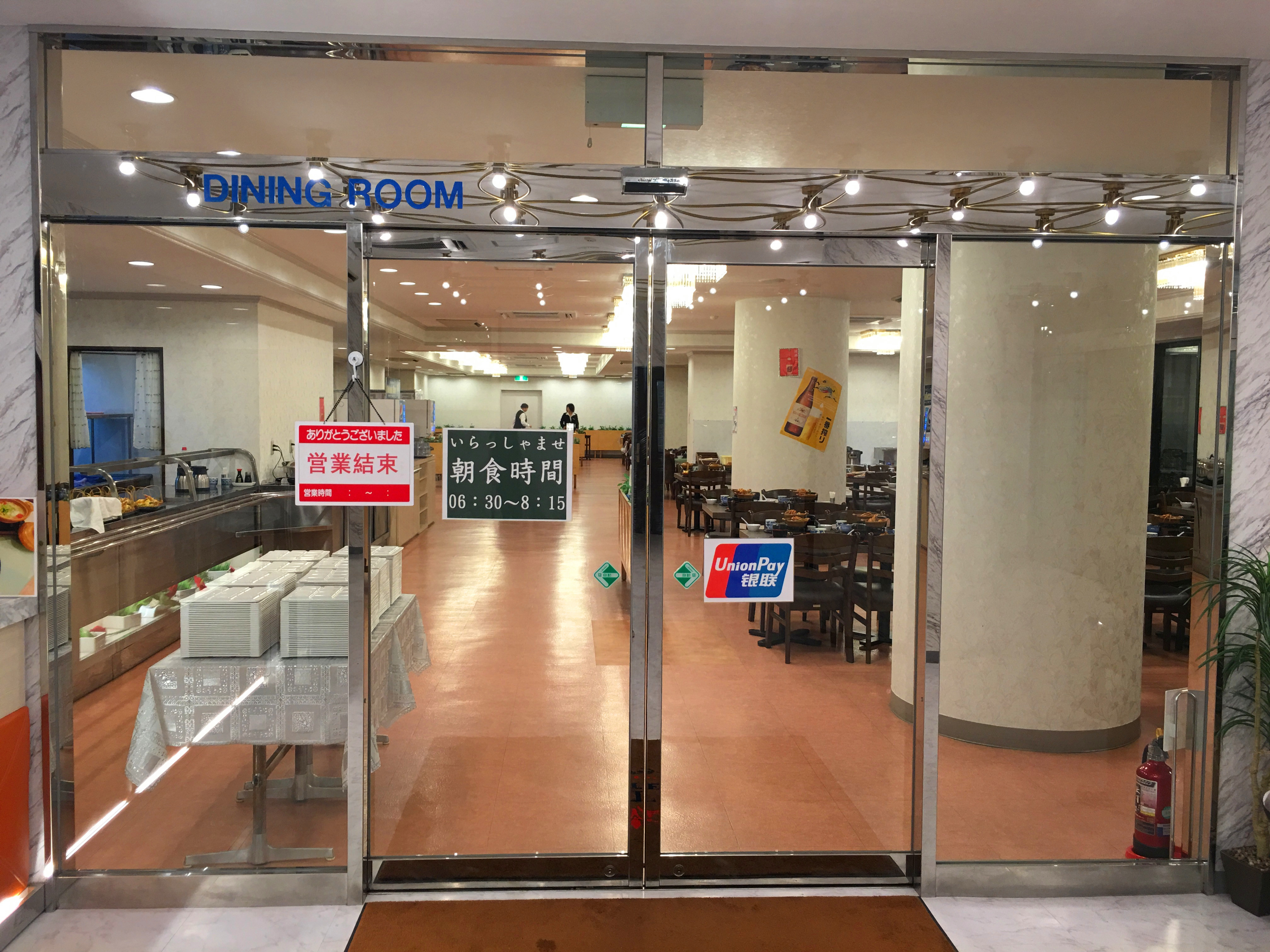
UnionPay decal on the door of a dining hall in Chiba, Japan

With the approval of the People's Bank of China (PBOC), China UnionPay was launched on 26 March 2002, in Shanghai by PBOC governor Dai Xianglong, The Industrial and Commercial Bank of China, the Agricultural Bank of China, the Bank of China and the China Construction Bank served as its first members. However, the concept of a unified Chinese bank card network dates back to 1993, with the formation of the "Golden Card Project" advocated by then-Chinese leader Jiang Zemin. UnionPay is considered its descendant, although attempts at unifying China's various credit card and interbank networks have been in place since the 1990s.

In 2014, UnionPay was reported to have been contributing to capital flight from China through poorly regulated store front operations in Macau. The same year, the total amount of cross-bank transactions of CUP card exceeded 41.1 trillion yuan. As part of Xi Jinping's anti-corruption campaign, central government officials met with local officials in Macau and reached an agreement in December 2014 that allows the central economic crimes bureau to have real-time access to all transactions in Macau involving UnionPay cards.

=== Partnerships ===
In 2005, UnionPay entered into agreements with other payment networks to increase acceptance around the world. Some major examples include:

- Discover in United States
- RuPay in India
- JCB in Japan
- BC Card in South Korea
- Mir in Russia
- Troy in Turkey

==== Use outside of China: Europe ====
UnionPay announced in 2016 that more than 2.2 million merchants in 39 European countries and regions accept UnionPay, taking up 50% of all the merchants supporting bankcard payment. Merchants from all sectors can integrate UnionPay and accept payments from their clients online or in-store. UnionPay is accepted at major department stores, airlines, duty-free stores and fashion stores, hotels, restaurants, historical and cultural sites, and entertainment establishments, such as bookstores and gift stores of le Louvre museum, Versailles, Orsay, Picasso, and Strasbourg Citrus Orchard. UnionPay is also accepted at business schools and Universities in order to allow Asian students to pay large sums of money for their tuition fees.

Merchants from certain sectors considered "High risk" or prohibited by the government cannot open a UnionPay account.

===== Process for merchants accepting UnionPay in Europe =====
Accepting UnionPay in Europe requires a third-party banking service. UnionPay tries to significantly multiply its partnerships to expand UnionPay's acceptance scope in Europe.

A European merchant can open a UnionPay account and start accepting payments through payment gateways which is licensed in the country of the merchant. Licensed payment gateways in Eurozone countries are:

- Adyen
- BNP Paribas
- Silkpay
- Stripe

==== Use outside of China: rest of the world ====
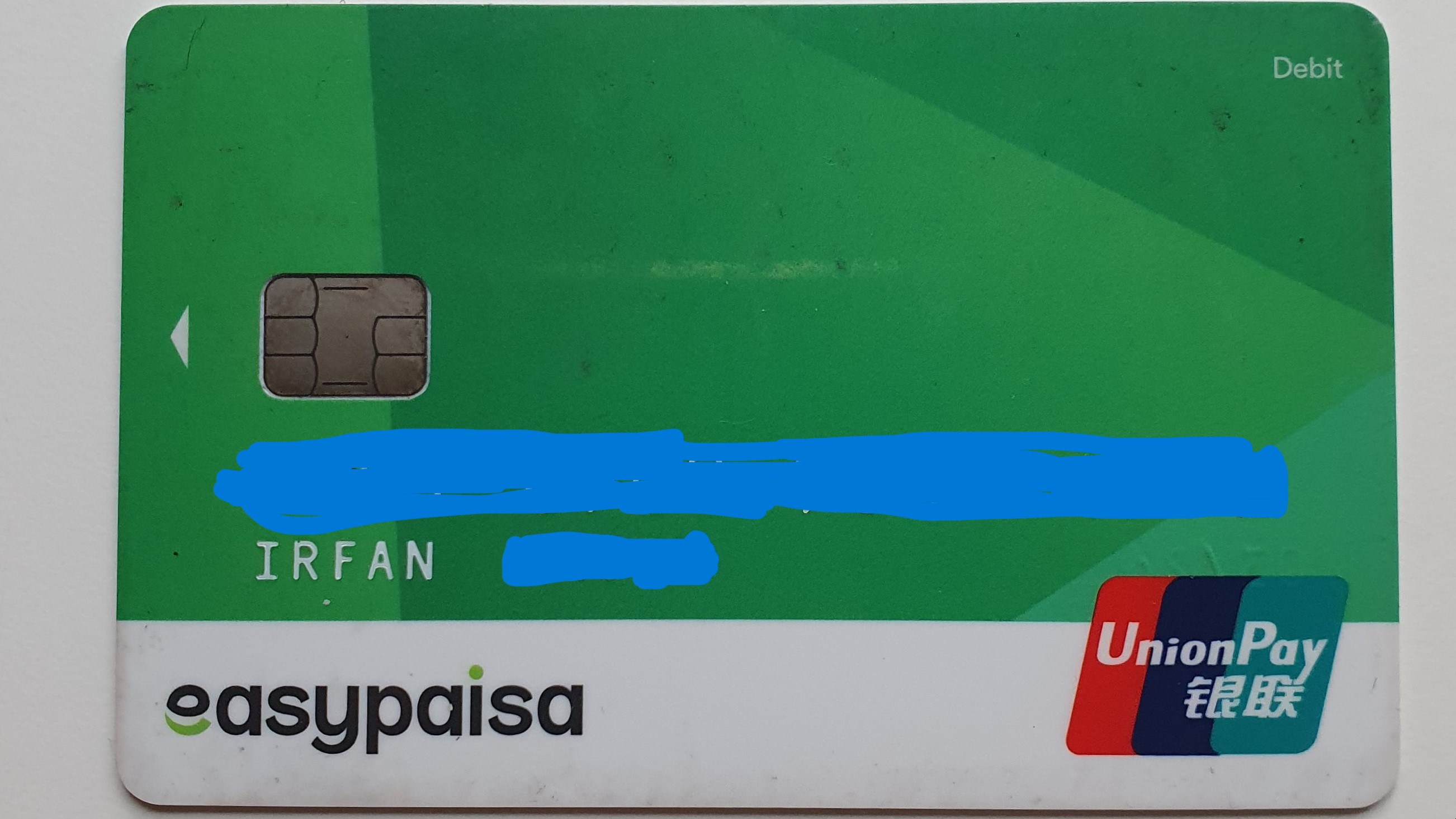
The picture shows an EasyPaisa debit card powered by UnionPay. The card number and name are usually at the front.

Some UnionPay credit cards are also affiliated with American Express (Amex), MasterCard, or Visa, and they can be used abroad as American Express, MasterCard, or Visa credit cards. UnionPay debit cards, however, can only be used in the UnionPay network and other networks that have signed contracts with UnionPay. Since 2006, China UnionPay cards can be used in over 100 countries outside China.

In May 2005, Discover Network announced an alliance with China UnionPay Network. The two companies have signed a long-term agreement that allows acceptance of Discover Network brand cards at UnionPay ATMs and point-of-sale terminals in China and acceptance of China UnionPay cards on the PULSE network in the U.S. As of 1 November 2007, China UnionPay cards may be accepted where Discover Network Cards are accepted in the United States, Canada, Mexico, Central America, and the Caribbean. As of early 2013, the cross acceptance agreement was expanded to support e-commerce or card-not-present transactions. In March 2010, PayPal announced a partnership with China UnionPay enabling the use of PayPal with UnionPay member cards. In 2015, China's State Administration of Foreign Exchange (SAFE) placed a ¥100,000 annual cap on overseas cash withdrawals from Chinese banks-issued UnionPay accounts.

=== 2022 Russian invasion of Ukraine ===
On 6 March 2022, Sberbank, Alfa Bank and Tinkoff Bank reported several Russian banks would switch to UnionPay after Visa and Mastercard said they would suspend operations in Russia due to Russia's invasion of Ukraine. The Russian banks intend to tie the UnionPay system with Russia's Mir network.

On 20 April 2022, UnionPay reportedly discontinued cooperation with major Russian banks including Sberbank. Russian media outlet RBK Daily stated that they did so out of fear of secondary sanctions.

In August 2022, it was reported that Russian visitors to Finland were circumventing banking restrictions by withdrawing euros from Finnish ATMs using UnionPay cards.

== Nihao China ==
On December 19, 2025, China UnionPay launched the "Nihao China" App, which aims to provide one-stop payment solutions and life services for overseas tourists travelling to China, including credit card binding, multilingual translation, departure tax refund and other services.

== Members ==
UnionPay is the primary network of these Chinese banks:

- Agricultural Bank of China
- Bank of China (including its Hong Kong-based subsidiaries Nanyang Commercial Bank and BOC Hong Kong)
- Bank of Communications (Credit cards co-issued with HSBC)
- Bank of Beijing
- Bank of Ningbo
- Bank of Shanghai
- China CITIC Bank
- China Construction Bank
- China Everbright Bank
- China Merchants Bank
- China Minsheng Banking Corporation
- Guangdong Development Bank
- Huaxia Bank (Credit cards co-issued with Deutsche Bank)
- Industrial and Commercial Bank of China (ICBC)
- Industrial Bank (Credit cards co-issued with Hang Seng Bank)
- Ping An Bank
- Postal Savings Bank of China (formerly known as the China Postal Savings and Remittance Bureau)
- Shanghai Pudong Development Bank
- Taizhou City Commercial Bank

Other UnionPay-affiliated organisations include municipal commercial banks as well as rural credit cooperatives. Overall, there are 165 financial institutions that issue UnionPay cards.

UnionPay had partnered with JETCO in Hong Kong and Macau until 1 January 2006. As of January 2013, Bank of East Asia and Citibank were the only banks allowed to independently issue UnionPay credit cards in Hong Kong and the mainland. HSBC and its subsidiary Hang Seng Bank independently issue UnionPay credit cards in Hong Kong, while they issue cards in the mainland in cooperation with local banks as noted above. Deutsche Bank only has co-issued cards, with no independently issued UnionPay credit cards.

The following eleven non-domestic banks have the right to issue UnionPay debit cards in China:

- Bank of China (Hong Kong)
- Bank of East Asia
- Citibank
- DBS Bank (as of July 2009)
- Hana Bank (as of November 2009)
- Hang Seng Bank
- HSBC
- OCBC Bank (as of 2010)
- OCBC Wing Hang Bank (as of 2010)
- Standard Chartered Bank
- Woori Bank (as of May 2009)

UnionPay in other countries:

- Altery offers a UnionPay debit card in select countries
- AGD Bank offers a UnionPay debit card in Myanmar
- Askari Bank offers a UnionPay debit card in Pakistan
- Australia Post, previously distributed the "Load&Go China" card, issued by Bank of China (Australia) Limited; featuring imagery of the Great Wall
- Baiduri Bank offers a UnionPay debit card in Brunei
- Bangkok Bank offers a UnionPay credit card in Thailand
- Bank Central Asia offers a UnionPay credit card in Indonesia
- Bank CenterCredit offers a UnionPay debit card in Kazakhstan.
- Banque Pour Le Commerce Exterieur Lao (BCEL) offers both UnionPay debit and Credit card in Laos
- Sinarmas Bank offers a UnionPay debit card in Indonesia
- BDO Unibank offers a UnionPay credit card in the Philippines
- Cebuana Lhuillier Micro Savings offers 24K UnionPay Debit Card in the Philippines.
- CIM Bank, a Swiss Bank, offers UnionPay credit cards to domestic and foreign customers
- DBS Bank offers a UnionPay debit card in Singapore.
- Halyk Bank offers both UnionPay credit and debit cards in Kazakhstan
- ABB offers UnionPay debit cards in Azerbaijan
- Russian Agricultural Bank offers a UnionPay debit card in Russia.
- Asian-Pacific Bank offers a UnionPay debit card in Russia.
- Joint Stock Commercial Bank for Foreign Trade of Vietnam (Vietcombank) offers both UnionPay credit and debit cards in Vietnam
- Kasikornbank offers a UnionPay credit card in Thailand
- Krung Thai Bank offers a UnionPay debit card in Thailand
- Lotte Card offers a UnionPay credit card in the Republic of Korea.
- Mitsubishi UFJ NICOS offers a UnionPay credit card in Japan.
- SCT Networks offers a UnionPay Debit card in Nepal.
- Himalayan Bank offers a UnionPay Prepaid cards in Nepal.
- Nepal Investment Bank Limited offers a UnionPay cards in Nepal.
- NIC ASIA Bank offers a UnionPay virtual cards in Nepal.
- AmBank offers a UnionPay Credit card in Malaysia.
- Public Bank offers a UnionPay Debit card in Malaysia.
- Philippine National Bank (PNB) offers a UnionPay credit card in the Philippines.
- Rizal Commercial Banking Corporation (RCBC) offers a UnionPay credit card in the Philippines.
- Sacombank offers both UnionPay credit and debit cards in Vietnam
- Mitsui Sumitomo Bank offers a UnionPay credit card in Japan.
- Shinhan Bank offers a UnionPay credit card in the Republic of Korea.
- United Overseas Bank offers a UnionPay credit card in Singapore.
- Diners Club offers 2 UnionPay credit cards in Singapore, the DCS Ultimate Platinum Card and the DCS Lite Card.
- National Bank of Pakistan offers UnionPay debit cards in Pakistan.
- 1LINK offers UnionPay debit cards through its member banks in Pakistan.
- Nuek, a Spanish fintech company, offers UnionPay debit cards in countries within SEPA under the brand 'Yi An'.
- Banco Bolivariano offers UnionPay credit cards in Ecuador

== See also ==
- Banking in China
- UnionPay (application)
