= Elo (card association) =

Brazilian national financial services corporation

- Industry: Financial services
- Headquarters: Barueri, São Paulo, Brazil
- Area served: Brazil
- Members: over 120 million
- Website: www.elo.com.br

Elo is a Brazilian national financial services corporation headquartered in Barueri, São Paulo, Brazil. Founded in 2011 by a holding company formed by three financial services companies: Banco Bradesco, Banco do Brasil, and Caixa Econômica Federal.

Elo offers financial services, including credit card, debit card, and prepaid card issuing and network processing. The network accepts transactions denominated in Brazilian real. As of March 2019, Elo has issued over 120 million cards. Since 2016, Elo cards have been accepted globally on the Discover/Diners Club network.
