= Discover Financial =

American financial company

Discover Financial Services, Inc.
- Type: Defunct
- Traded as: NYSE: DFS (2007–2025)
- Industry: Financial services
- Founded: 1985; 41 years ago
- Founder: Sears
- Defunct: May 18, 2025; 16 months ago
- Fate: Acquired by Capital One
- Headquarters: Riverwoods, Illinois, U.S.
- Key people: Michael Rhodes (CEO); Thomas Maheras (chairman)
- Products: Payment systems, Credit cards, Finance, Consumer banking, Loans
- Revenue: ▲US$20.61 billion (2023)
- Operating income: ▼US$3.83 billion (2023)
- Net income: ▼US$2.94 billion (2023)
- Total assets: ▲US$151.5 billion (2023)
- Total equity: ▲US$14.83 billion (2023)
- Number of employees: c. 21,100 (2023)
- Parent: Dean Witter Reynolds (1985–1997); Morgan Stanley (1997–2007); Capital One (2025–present)
- Subsidiaries: Diners Club International; Discover Card; Pulse
- Website: discover.com

Discover Financial Services, Inc. was an American bank holding company that offered consumer banking products and owned Discover Card, Pulse, and Diners Club International. In May 2025, the company was acquired by Capital One.

== History ==
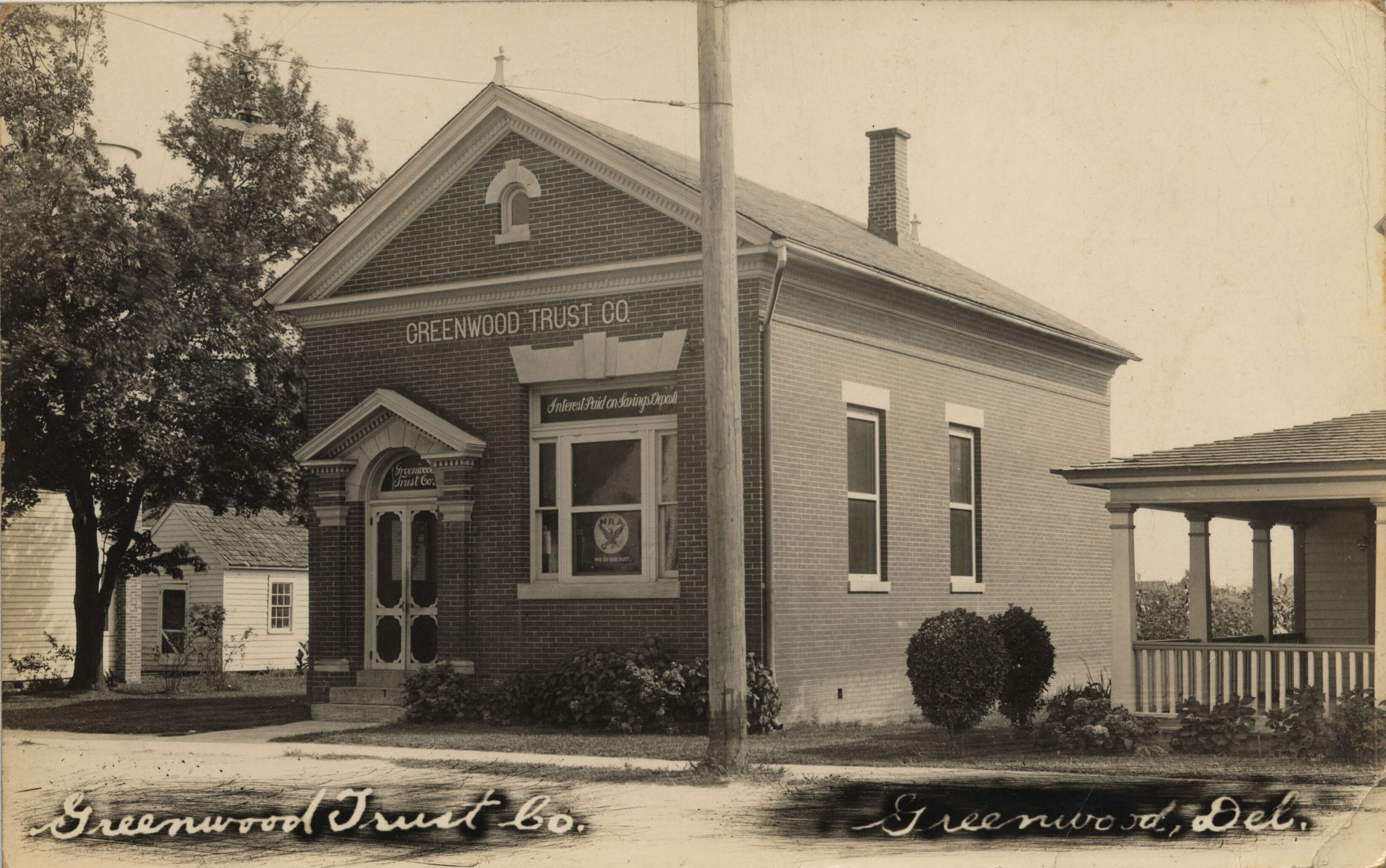
1936 postcard of the Greenwood Trust Company

In 1981, Sears, Roebuck and Company purchased Dean Witter Reynolds, a brokerage firm, and Coldwell Banker, a real estate franchise, as an attempt to add financial services to its portfolio of customer services. In 1985, Sears also acquired the Greenwood Trust Company. These companies operated under a Sears subsidiary called Dean Witter Financial Services Group, Inc. The plan to create a one-stop financial-services center in Sears stores was not as successful as Sears had hoped. Its credit card operations accounted for a loss of $22 million in the fourth quarter of 1986, and a loss of $25.8 million in the first quarter of 1987.

In 1985, the company acquired The Greenwood Trust Company, founded in 1911 in Greenwood, Delaware. It was renamed Discover Bank in August 2000.

In March 1993, Sears completed the corporate spin-off of its financial services branch as a public company called Dean Witter, Discover & Co.

In 1995, Discover Card Services, Inc. changed its name to NOVUS Services, Inc. to distinguish its network functions from the Discover Card.

In 1995, the discovercard.com website was launched.

In 1997, the company merged with Morgan Stanley to become Morgan Stanley Dean Witter, Discover & Co.

In October 1998, the company rebranded itself "Discover Financial Services, Inc." The NOVUS logo was retired, replaced by the Discover Network logo.

In December 1998, the company introduced Discover Platinum, a premium card featuring new ways to increase rewards, low balance transfer and annual percentage rates, no annual fee, and expanded credit lines.

In 2002, Discover launched the industry's first keychain credit card.

In October 2004, the Supreme Court of the United States upheld a ruling in Discover's favor that challenged exclusionary policies of Visa and MasterCard, stating that Mastercard and Visa were violating antitrust regulations with anticompetitive practices. Before this ruling, Visa and MasterCard would not allow banks to issue a Discover or American Express card if they issued a card by Visa or MasterCard. Within days of the court ruling, Discover filed a lawsuit in federal court seeking damages from Visa and MasterCard. In October 2008, DFS was awarded $2.75 billion in damages, the third largest settlement at the time in U.S. history. Shortly after the Supreme Court ruling, Discover struck its first deal to have its cards issued by another financial institution, GE Consumer Finance, which began to issue credit cards for retailer Walmart and its wholesale warehouse stores, Sam's Club. Transactions were processed on the Discover Network. Sam's Club exclusively accepted Discover for many years; since November 2006, it has also accepted MasterCard for purchases.

In April 2014, Walmart ended its relationship with Discover. Walmart began converting all Discover-branded cards to Mastercard beginning in June 2014.

In January 2005, Discover Financial Services acquired Pulse, an interbank electronic funds transfer payments network, for $311 million. The acquisition enabled the company to offer debit cards.

HSBC issued Discover-branded credit cards processed through the Discover Network since its acquisition of card issuer Metris in late 2005. Metris had originally signed an agreement with Discover in September 2005, three months prior to the HSBC acquisition.

In 2006, Discover Network united with Visa, MasterCard, American Express, and JCB to form the Payment Card Industry (PCI) Security Standards Council, which helps to manage account security throughout the transaction process.

In July 2006, DFS and First Data announced that First Data would offer Discover Network card services to small- and mid-sized merchants.

In June 2007, Morgan Stanley completed the corporate spin-off of Discover.

In July 2008, Discover Financial acquired the Diners Club International network from Citigroup for $165 million.

Following the 2008 financial crisis, Discover received about $1.2 billion in bailout funds under the Troubled Asset Relief Program (TARP). In 2010, the company repaid the funds.

In 2010, Discover and Softcard announced a strategic partnership to build a mobile payment network that utilizes mobile phones to make point-of-sale purchases.

In September 2010, Discover acquired Citigroup-owned Student Loan Corporation. The deal was finalized in December 2010, renamed Discover Student Loans, and expanded DFS's market presence and origination capabilities in private student loans. In 2014, DFS launched Rewards for Good Grades, rewarding college and graduate students who get at least a 3.0 GPA (or equivalent) a one-time cash reward equal to 1% of the loan amount on each new Discover student loan. In 2015, DFS introduced an interactive tool called FAFSA Assistant to help students and their families get ready to complete the FAFSA. The tool provides individualized tips and guidance based on personal situations.

In June 2012, LendingTree completed the sale of substantially all of the operating assets of its Home Loan Center business to a wholly owned subsidiary of Discover Financial for $45.9 million, including payments made prior to the closing which were applied to the closing price.

In June 2012, Discover began originating mortgages with its launch of Discover Home Loans, offering prime variable- and fixed-rate conventional and FHA home mortgage loans.

In 2013, Discover's Home Loans business started offering home equity loans.

In September 2012, Discover was ordered to pay over $200 million in fines and customer reimbursements to settle accusations by U.S. federal regulators that it had engaged in deceptive telemarketing tactics.

In 2012, Discover announced a five year, $10 million commitment called Pathway to Financial Success to help bring financial education curriculum to public high schools in the US.

In 2013, Discover and PayPal partnered to enable merchants to accept PayPal through their existing relationship with Discover. The same year, Discover Cashback Checking was introduced. The checking account product paid customers ten cents for every debit card purchase, online bill payment, and check written. Additionally, the Discover it card was announced. The card rewards cardmembers with 5% cash back in rotating categories each quarter, such as at gas stations or restaurants. Discover also introduced Discover Home Equity Loans. Discover also became the first major credit card issuer to provide free access to FICO Credit Scores based on TransUnion data directly to its cardmembers on their monthly statements. Additional information provided with their FICO Credit Scores were educational content to help them better understand their scores.

In 2021, Discover Bank originated 14,148 mortgages worth $1.3 billion.

Acquisition of Discover Financial by Capital One

- Initiator: Capital One
- Target: Discover Financial
- Type: Full acquisition
- Cost: US$35 billion
- Initiated: February 19, 2024
- Completed: May 18, 2025

In May 2025, Capital One acquired Discover Financial in an all-stock deal worth $35.3 billion, making it the largest credit card issuer in the U.S.

== Advertising and sponsorships ==
From 1998 to 2007, Discover Card owned a billboard at One Times Square, just above the flagpole where the Times Square Ball is placed and Discover sponsored the annual ball drop.

From its opening in 2001 to 2012, Sugarloaf Mills Mall in Lawrenceville, Georgia, was named Discover Mills in a $10 million naming rights partnership with Discover Card. The slogan for the mall was "Where Discover Card is the Smart Choice". It was the first shopping mall to have granted naming rights.

Beginning in 2010, Discover was the official credit-card partner of the National Hockey League.

In 2011 and 2012, Discover Card's float won the Grand Marshal award for excellence in creative concept and design in the Rose Parade in Pasadena.

From 2011 to 2013, Discover was the sponsor of the college football Orange Bowl. It was also the sponsor of the 2013 BCS National Championship Game.

In 2017, Discover was named the first ever presenting sponsor and official credit card of the Big Ten Football Championship Game as part of a multi-year sponsorship.

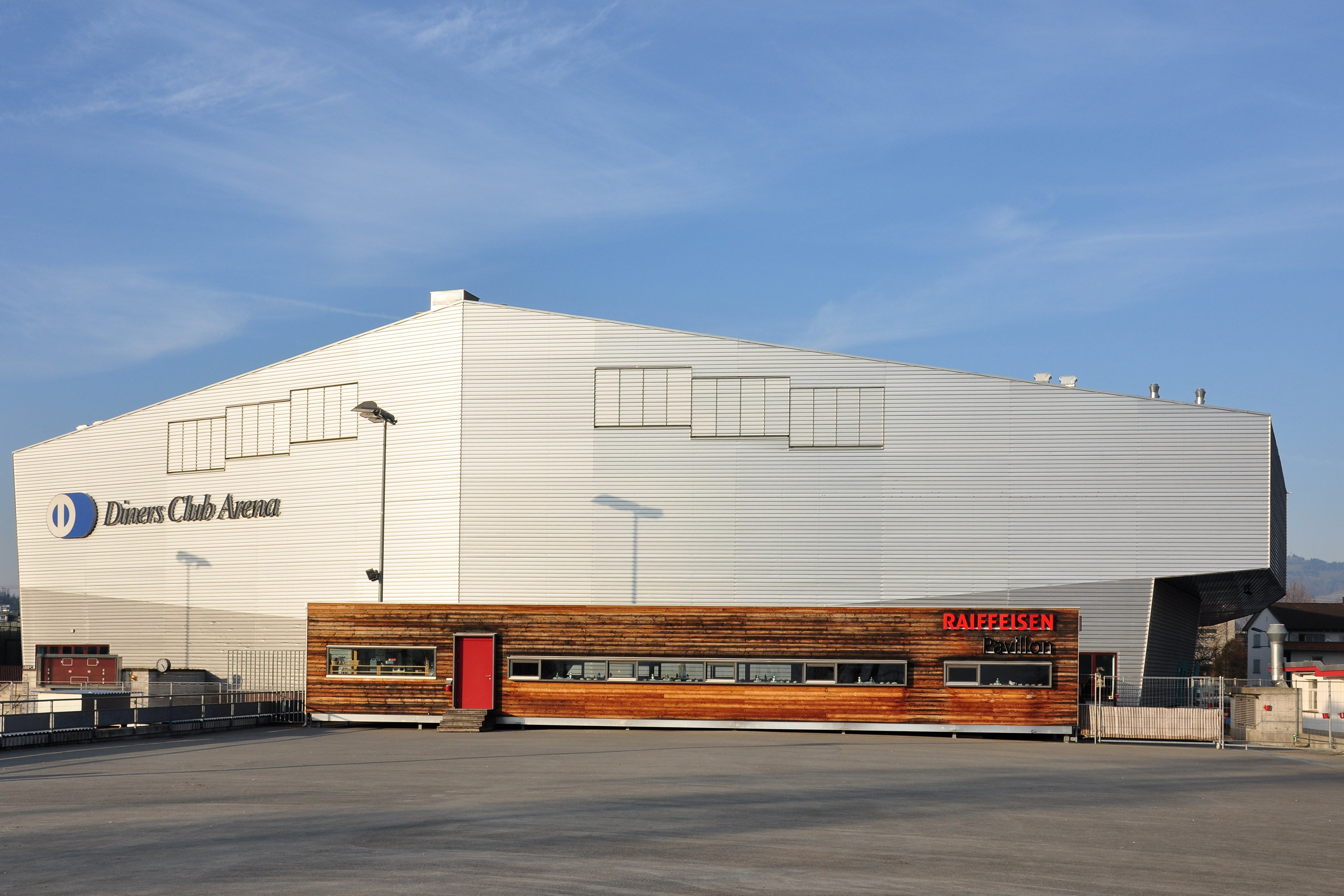
Diners Club Arena in the Canton of St. Gallen, Switzerland was sponsored by Diners Club International from 2005 to 2016

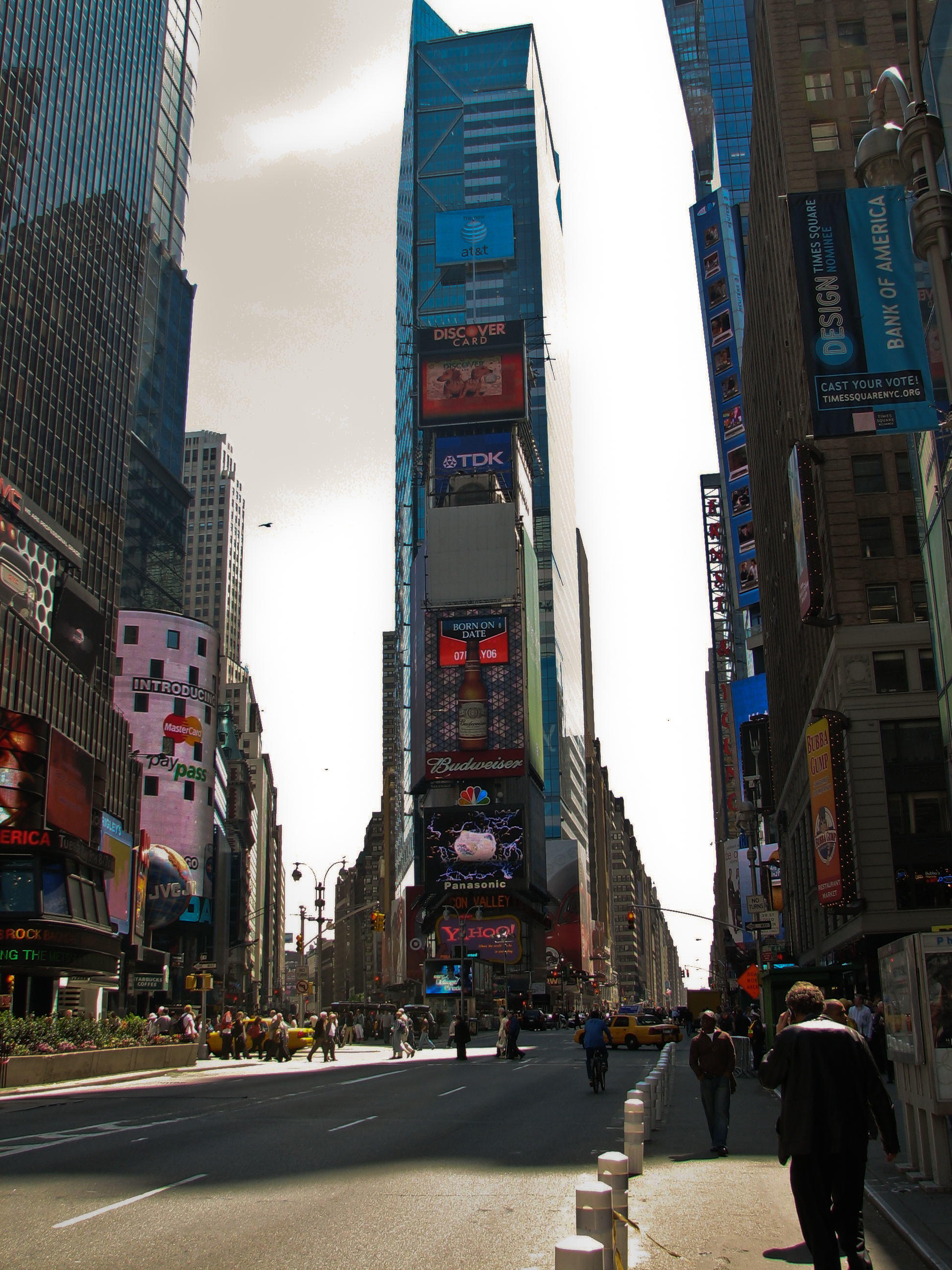
Discover advertisement on One Times Square in 2006

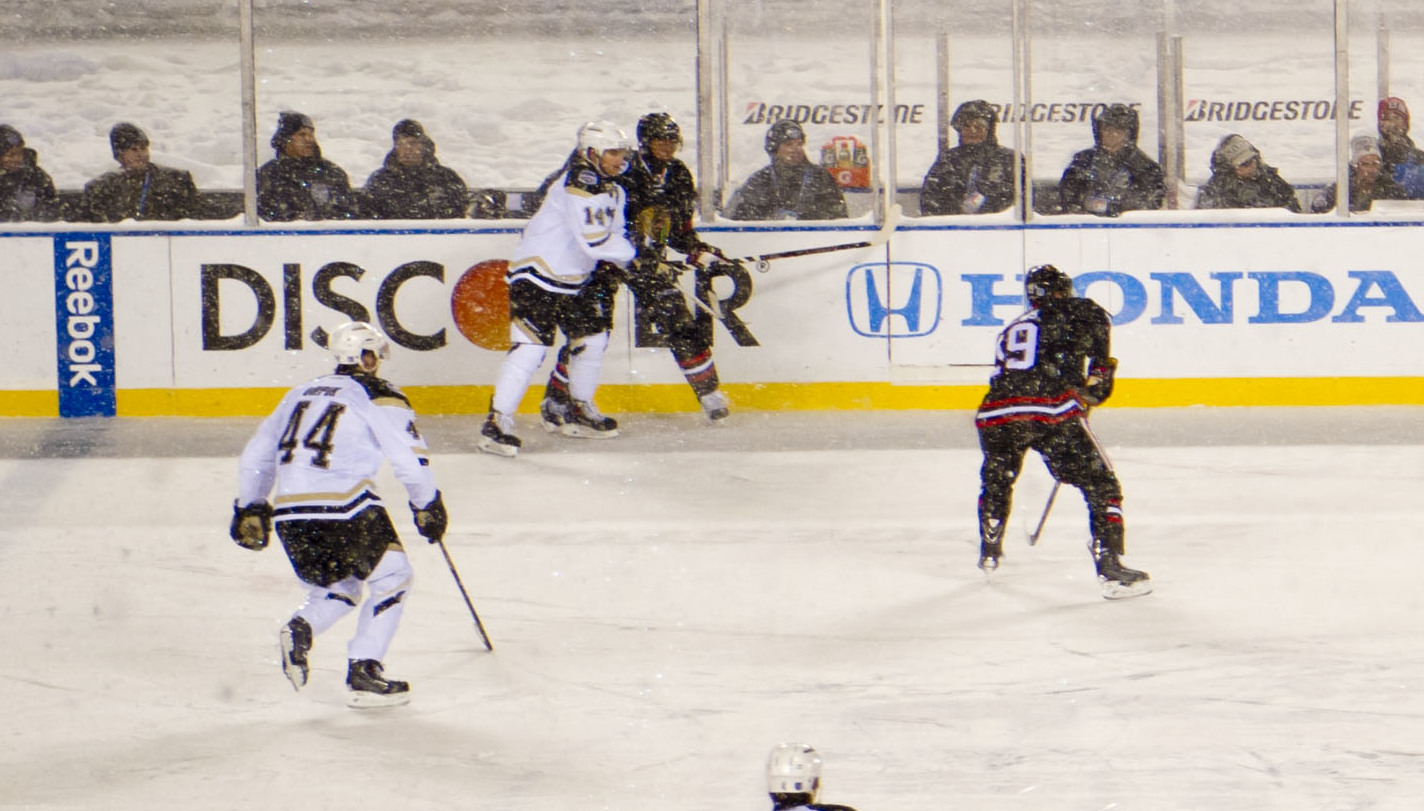
Discover advertisement on dasherboards at a 2014 NHL Stadium Series game at Soldier Field, Chicago
