= Shinhan Financial Group =

Financial holding company in Seoul, South Korea

Shinhan Financial Group Co., Ltd.

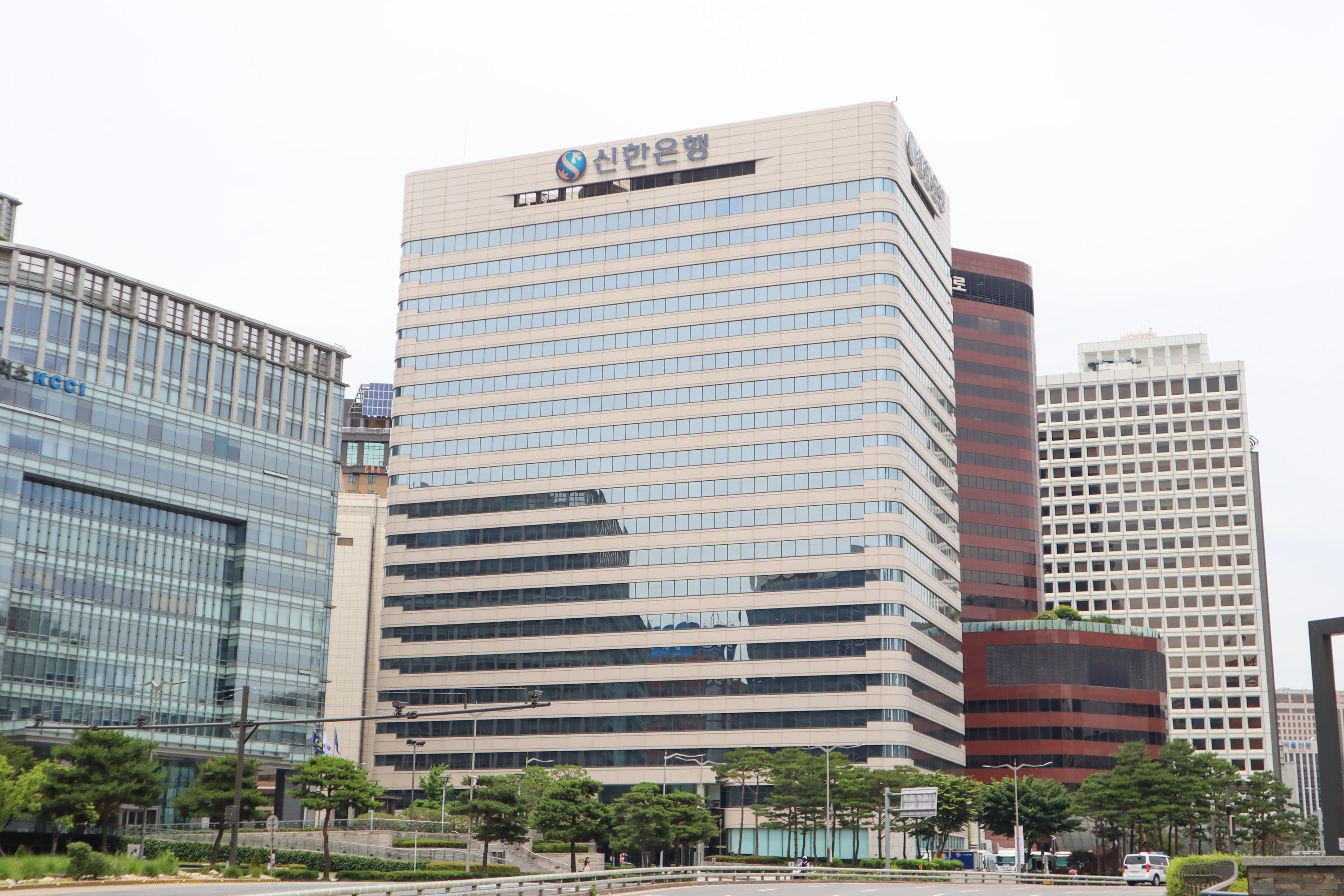
- Native name: 주식회사 신한금융지주회사
- Type: Public
- Traded as: KRX: 055550; NYSE: SHG
- Industry: Financial services
- Founded: September 2001; 24 years ago
- Headquarters: 20, Sejong-daero 9-gil, Jung-gu, Seoul, South Korea
- Area served: Worldwide
- Key people: Jin Ok-Dong (chairman & CEO)
- Number of employees: ▼167 (2020)
- Subsidiaries: Shinhan Bank; Shinhan Card; Shinhan Asset Management
- Website: www.shinhangroup.com

Shinhan Financial Group Co., Ltd. (Korean: 주식회사 신한금융지주회사; RR: Jusik Hoesa Sinhan Geumyung Jiju Hoesa) is a financial holding company headquartered in Seoul, South Korea. Its subsidiaries provide a full range of financial services, including banking, securities, life insurance, and investment banking. It was founded in 1982 and is now one of Korea's so-called Big Five financial groups, along with KB Financial Group, NH Financial Group, Hana Financial Group, and Woori Financial Group.

For the year 2025, South Korea’s four largest financial holding companies (KB, Shinhan, Hana, and Woori) reported a combined nearly 18 trillion won ($12.6 billion) in net profit. Specifically, Shinhan reported a net profit of 4.97 trillion won, up 11.7%.

In 2025, the company generated more than 1 trillion won ($695 million) in overseas pre-tax profit, becoming the first Korean financial group to cross this monetary threshold.

== Subsidiaries ==
Shinhan Financial Group owns a total of 17 direct subsidiaries under Korean Law.

Subsidiaries	Ownership by SFG	Notes
Shinhan Bank	100.0%	
Shinhan Card	100.0%	
Shinhan Investment Corp.	100.0%	
Shinhan Life Insurance	100.0%	Merged Orange Life in July 2021
Shinhan Capital	100.0%	
Shinhan Asset Management	100.0%	Formerly Shinhan BNP Paribas Asset Management
Jeju Bank	75.3%	Currently listed on the Korea Exchange (KRX: 006220)
Shinhan Savings Bank	100.0%	
Asia Trust. Co., Ltd.	60.0%	
Shinhan DS	100.0%	
Shinhan AITAS	99.8%	
Shinhan Credit Information	100.0%	
Shinhan Alternative Investment Management	100.0%	
Shinhan REITs Management	100.0%	
Shinhan AI	100.0%	
Shinhan Venture Investment	100.0%	Formerly Neoplux Co., Ltd.
SHC Management	100.0%	Currently in liquidation proceedings

On May 5, 2026, Shinhan Financial Group held a Subsidiary CEO Candidate Recommendation Committee (Subsidiary Committee) meeting. It recommended Cheon Sang-young, Vice President of Shinhan, as the president candidate for Shinhan Life, and Lee Seok-won, former Head of the Strategy Division at the National Pension Service’s Fund Management Headquarters, as the president candidate for Shinhan Asset Management. This marked the replacement of two out of four subsidiary CEOs whose terms were expiring. The remaining two subsidiaries—Shinhan Asset Trust and Shinhan EZ General Insurance—received one-year extension recommendations for their current presidents, Lee Seung-soo and Kang Byung-kwan, respectively.

== Operations ==
In August 2018, Shinhan Financial Group acquired ING Life, Korea's sixth-largest life insurer, for about 2.4 trillion won (US$2 billion).

In August 2024, Shinhan opened its new Vietnam headquarters in Ho Chi Minh City’s Thu Thiem financial district, bringing its subsidiaries together under one roof.

In May 2025, it was announced that Shinhan chairman Jin Ok-dong had met with senior executives of United States-based multinational investment bank Goldman Sachs to discuss strategic cooperation and growth initiatives.

In March 2026, Shinhan Investment Securities signed a memorandum of understanding (MOU) with Bridgecode to strengthen advisory services for succession-type mergers and acquisitions (M&A) of small and mid-sized companies. Later that month, it was announced that Jin Ok-dong, the current chairman, had been approved by shareholders to lead the banking group for another three years.

In April 2026, Shinhan and Visa Inc., held talks to discuss potential cooperation in global payments and technology-driven finance.

== Executives (past and present) ==
=== Honorary Chairman ===
- Lee Hee-gun (2001–2011)

=== Chairman of the Board ===
- Namgoong Hoon (2012–2016)
- Park Cheol (2016–Present)

=== Chairman & CEO ===
- Ra Eung-chan (2001–2010)
- Han Dong-woo (2011–2017)
- Cho Yong-byeong (2017–2022)
- Jin Ok-dong (2023–Present)

=== President & CEO ===
- Ra Eung-chan (2001–2003)
- Choi Young-hwi (2003–2005)
- Lee In-ho (2005–2009)
- Shin Sang-hoon (2009–2010)

== See also ==
- Shinhan Donghae Open
