= Troy (card scheme) =

Turkish card scheme

TROY
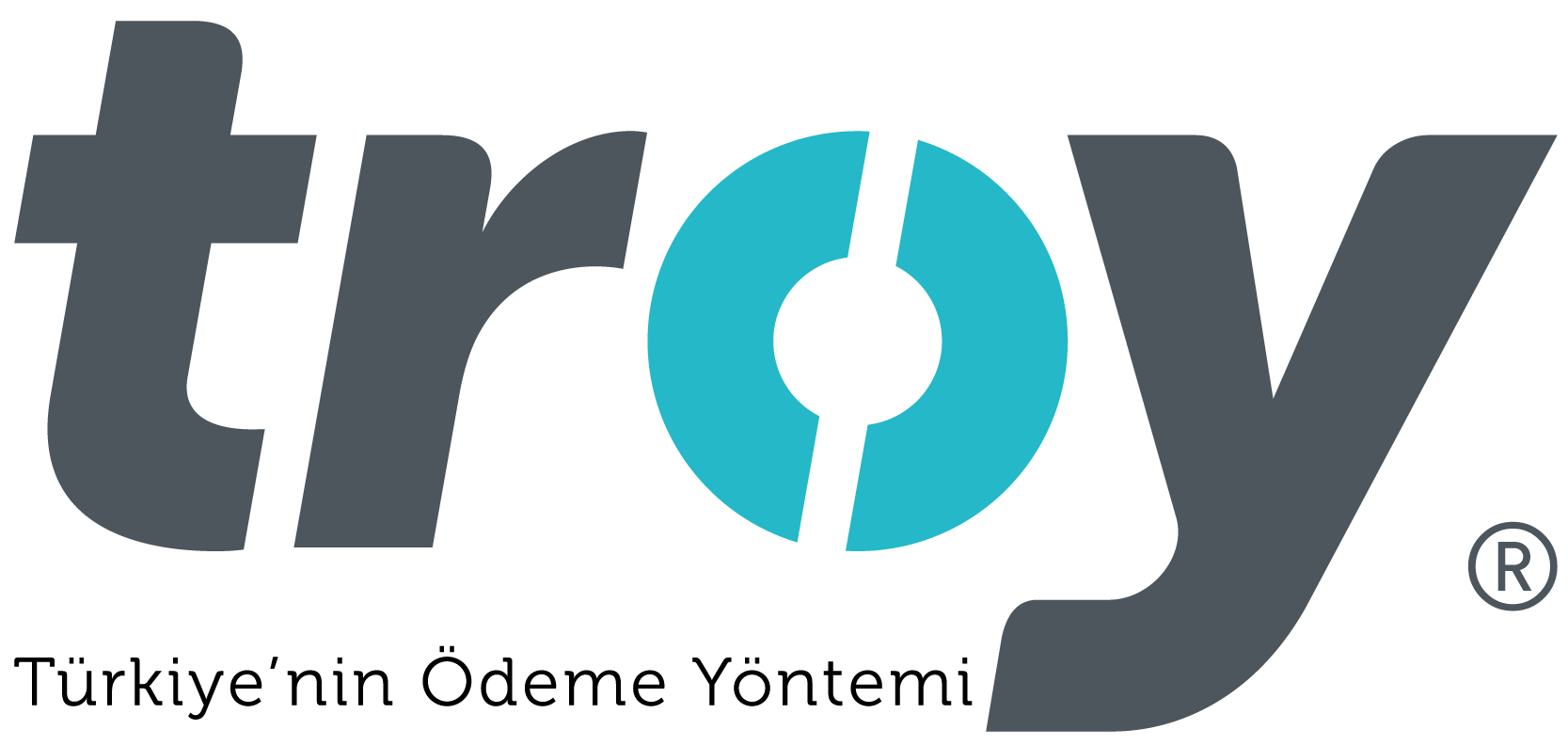
- Industry: Financial services
- Genre: Bank card
- Founded: March 31, 2016; 10 years ago (Note: It was launched on 29 September 2015 and has taken operating licence on 31 March 2016.)
- Founder: Interbank Card Center
- Headquarters: Turkey
- Area served: Worldwide
- Services: Credit card; Debit Card
- Parent: Interbank Card Center
- Website: www.troyodeme.com/en

Turkey's Payment Method, TROY, was established in 2016 within the Interbank Card Center. to support the development of Turkey's financial technology ecosystem. TROY collaborates with all card issuers and payment service providers to offer a robust infrastructure for Turkey's payment systems.

TROY offers financial services, including credit card, debit card, and prepaid card issuing and network processing. Since 2017, TROY cards have been accepted in the United States on the Discover Card network.

Within the card reciprocal agreements, TROY cards are also accepted on the Diners Club and Discover Card networks.
