= JCB (credit card company) =

International credit card company based in Japan

JCB Co., Ltd.

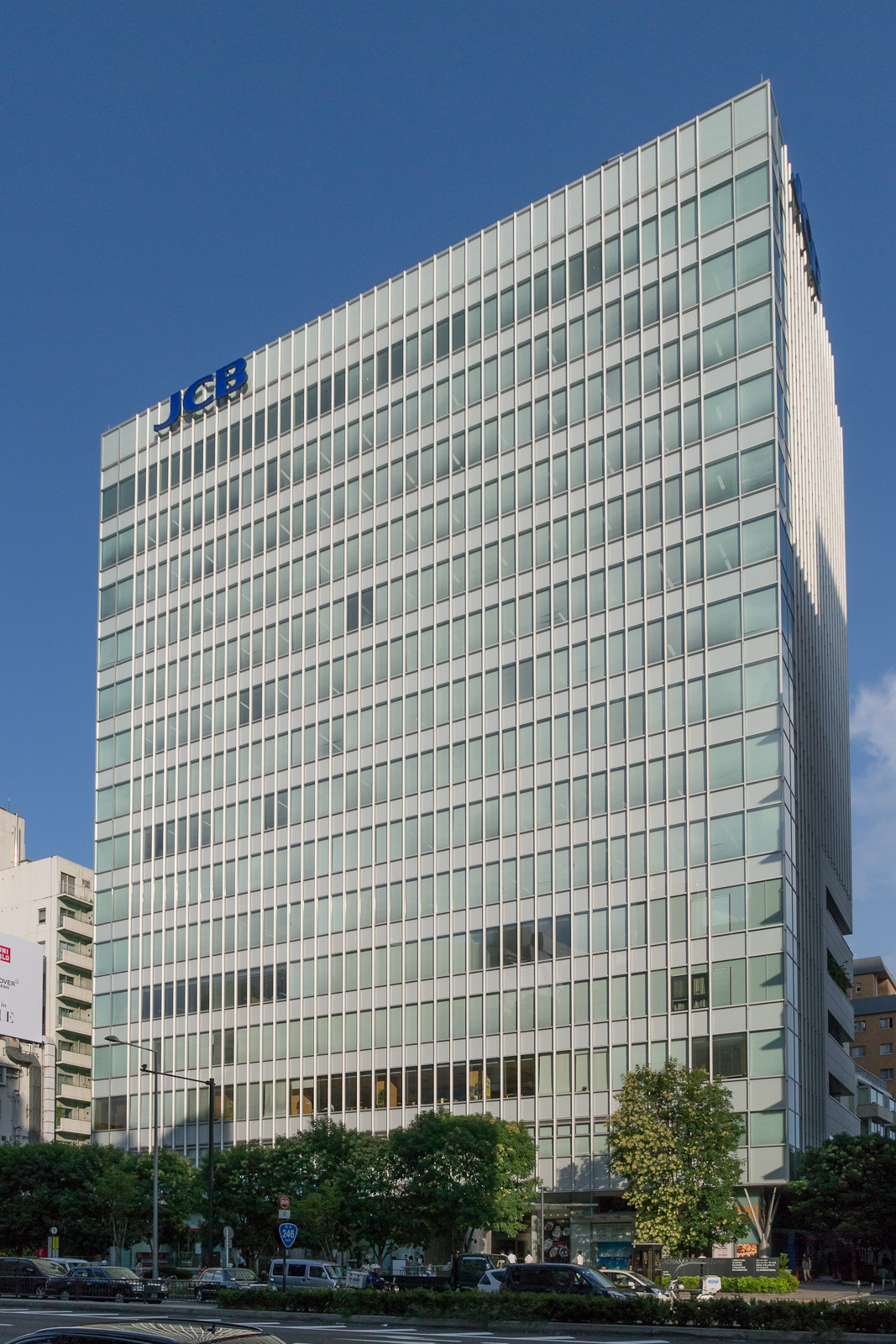
- JCB Headquarters (Aoyama Rise Square, Minato-ku, Tokyo)
- Native name: 株式会社ジェーシービー
- Type: Private
- Industry: Financial services
- Founded: January 25, 1961; 65 years ago
- Defunct: April 30, 2018 (U.S. only)
- Headquarters: Minato, Tokyo, Japan
- Area served: Select regions
- Key people: Ichiro Hamakawa (浜川 一郎) (Executive director)
- Products: Payment systems Credit cards
- Number of employees: 4,389 (2022)
- Website: www.global.jcb

JCB Co., Ltd. (株式会社ジェーシービー, Kabushiki gaisha jē shī bī), formerly Japan Credit Bureau, is a credit card company based in Tokyo, Japan.

== History ==
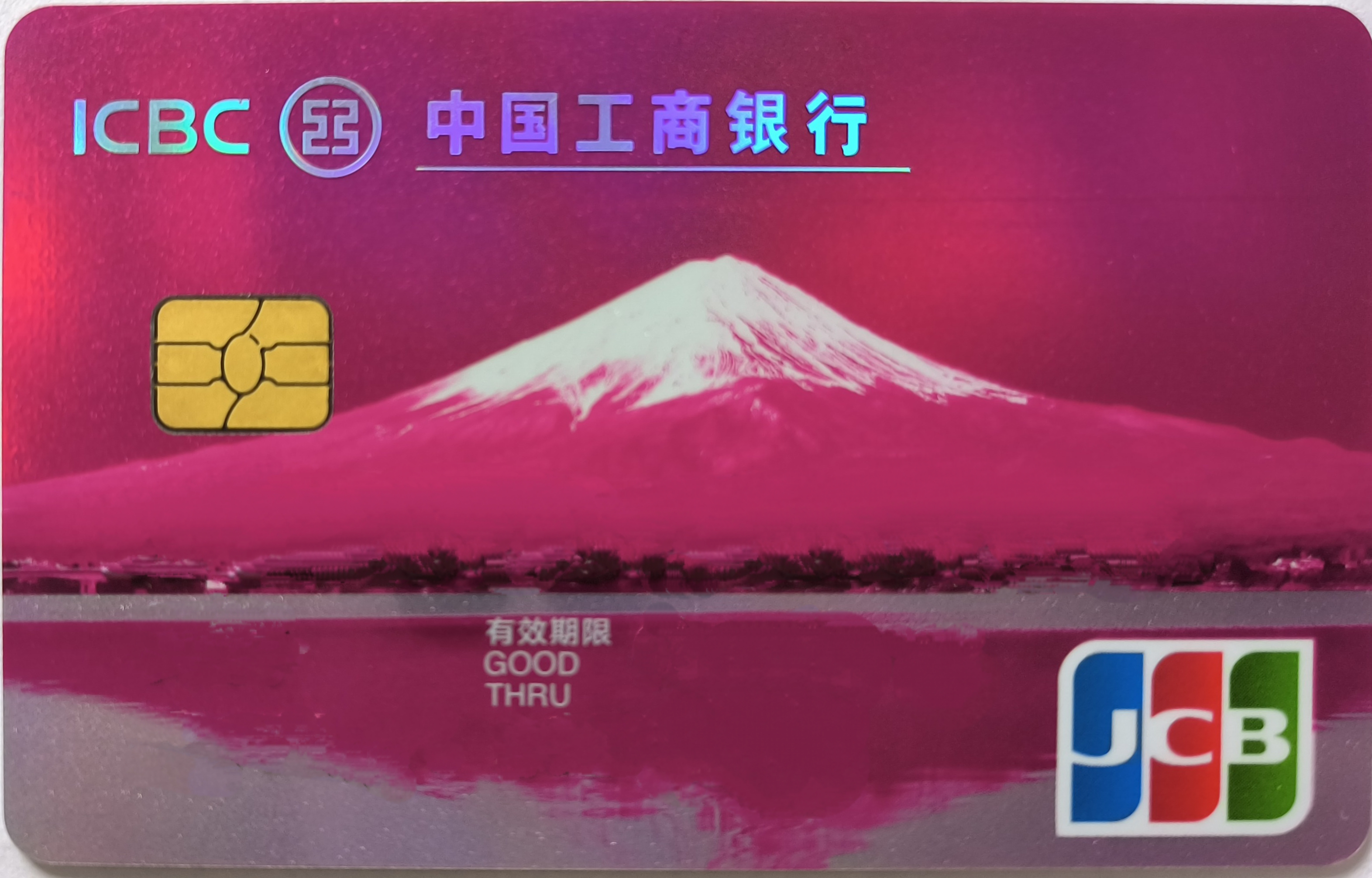
An ICBC JCB credit card issued in 2025. ICBC is one of the JCB card-issuing banks in China.

Japan Credit Bureau was founded in 1961 by Sanwa Bank (now MUFG Bank) and Nippon Shinpan (now Mitsubishi UFJ NICOS), as the country's second credit card issuer and payment network after the Japanese branch of Diners Club International. JCB firmly established itself in the Japanese credit card market after purchasing, and then absorbing, Hokkaido Credit Bureau and Osaka Credit Bureau in 1968. As of 2020 its cards are issued to 130 million customers in 23 countries. JCB also operates a network of membership airport lounges for holders of their Platinum Cards issued outside Japan.

JCB cards are issued in 24 countries. In most of these, JCB is affiliated with financial institutions to issue JCB-branded cards.

In the United States, JCB is not a primary credit card network such as Visa or MasterCard. While the brand was primarily accepted by tourism-related businesses such as airlines and car rental companies, it gained wider acceptance in 2006 when JCB announced an alliance with Discover Network. The two companies signed a long-term agreement that led to the acceptance of Discover Network brand cards at JCB point-of-sale terminals in Japan and of JCB cards on the Discover network in the U.S. This partnership became operational in 2011.

Local JCB accounts in the United States were issued by JCB USA, and offered to residents of California, Connecticut, Illinois, New York, New Jersey, Oregon, Washington and Hawaii. JCB USA stopped issuing JCB cards in the American market on January 8, 2018, and closed all current consumer credit card accounts on April 30, 2018. Foreign JCB cards continue to work through the Discover network partnership.
