= National Banks in Meiji Japan =

Banking system framework in late-19C Japan

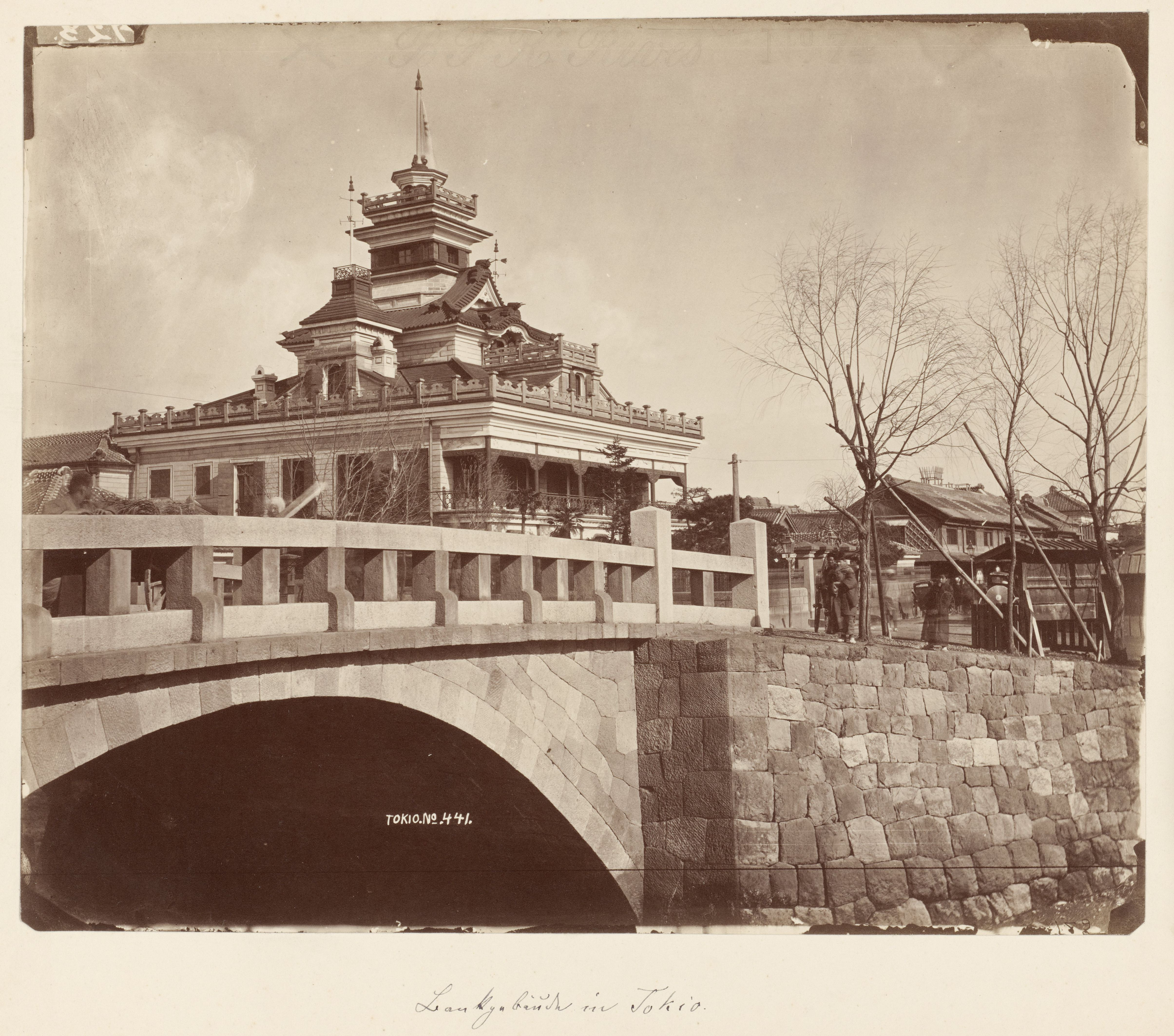
First building of the Dai-Ichi ("First") National Bank in Nihonbashi, Tokyo, photographed across Kaiun Bridge in the late 19th century

The National Banks in Meiji Japan were a system of organization of the Japanese banking system created in the 1870s, inspired by the U.S. National Bank Act of the previous decade.

Under the system, national banks were individually chartered by the government as banks of issue whose banknotes were all accepted as legal tender. Starting with Dai-Ichi National Bank in 1873, around 150 national banks were thus created, most of which morphed into still-extant Japanese banks via multiple mergers and restructurings. The national banking system itself, however, was short-lived. It was superseded by the newly created Bank of Japan, inspired by European models and established in the early 1880s, and fully phased out in the late 1890s.

== Background ==
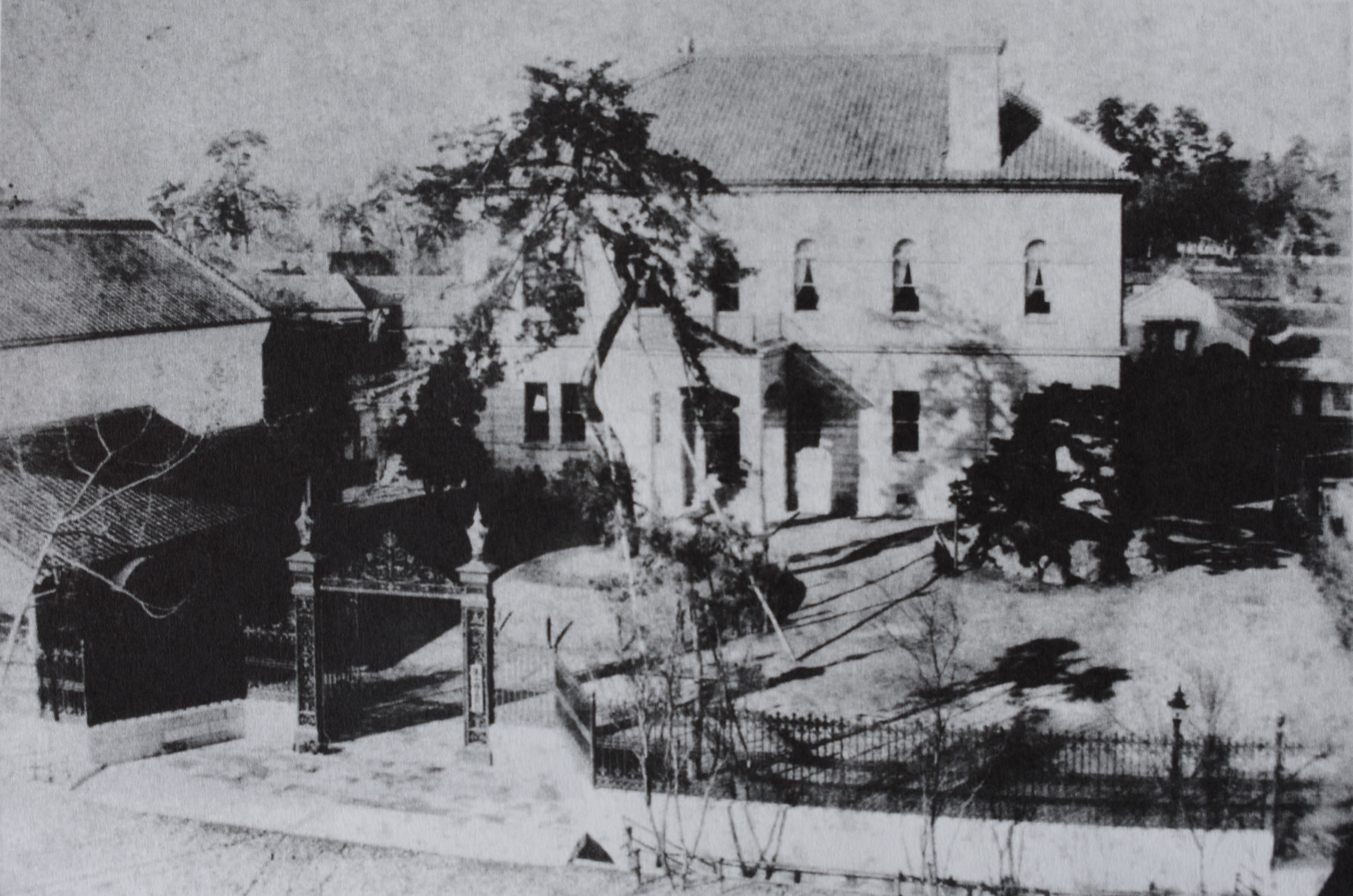
Tenth Bank building in Yamanashi (ca. 1888)

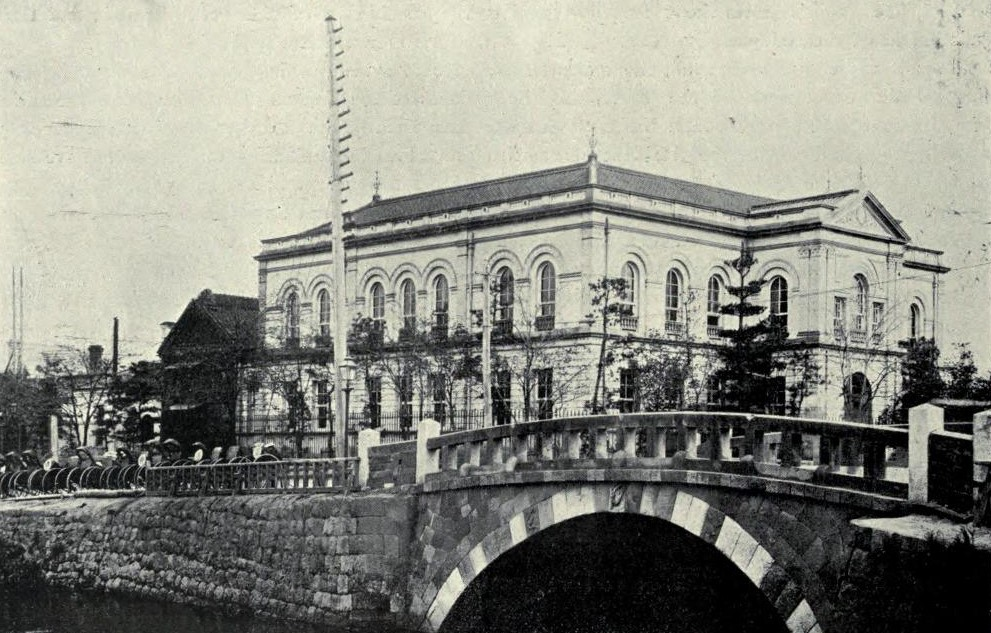
Fifteenth National Bank building in Tokyo (1910)

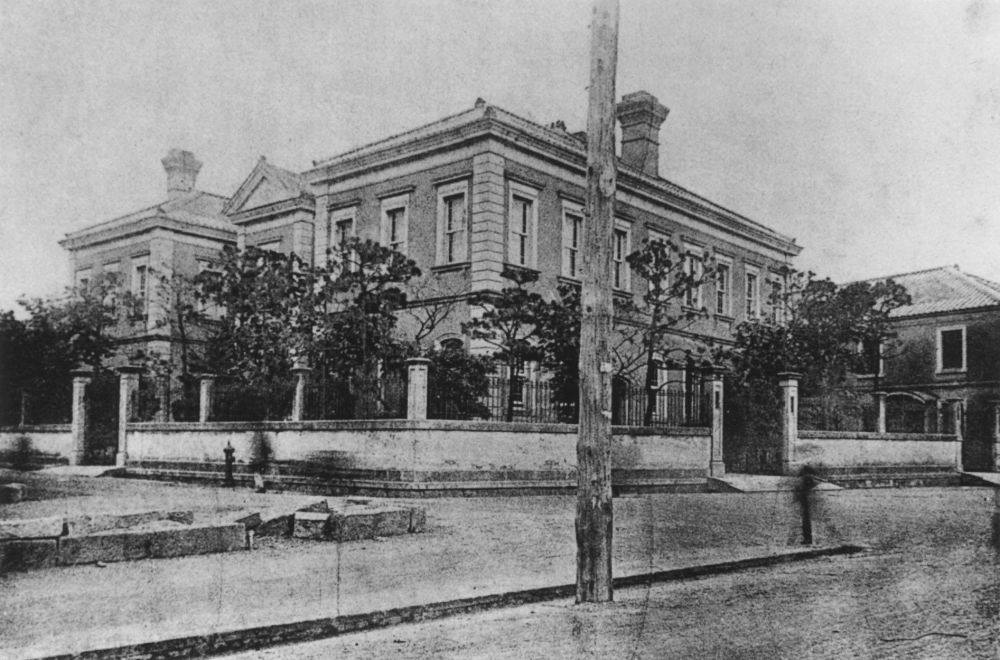
Eighteenth National Bank building in Nagasaki (1889)

Immediately after the Meiji Restoration in 1869, Japanese merchants in major trading centers introduced prototypes of modern commercial banks, known as kawase-kaisha, which were authorized to issue banknotes. These were established in Tokyo, Yokohama, Kyoto, Osaka, Kobe, Ōtsu, Niigata, and Tsuruga. After a few months, however, all kawase-kaisha except that of Yokohama collapsed following bank runs.

== Original National Banking Act (1872) ==
In 1870 Itō Hirobumi, then a senior official at the Ministry of Finance, proposed a system based on multiple banks issuing gold-back paper currency. The next year, however, his ministry colleague Yoshida Kiyonari suggested a more conservative alternative with a single central bank inspired by the Bank of England. Later in 1871, Itō's stance prevailed. The Meiji government adopted the gold standard, issued its own government notes, then enacted the National Bank Act of December 1872 under which national banks would engage in commercial banking while issuing convertible notes. Shibusawa Eiichi, by then also a Finance Ministry official, drafted the law under the guidance of leading statesman Ōkubo Toshimichi.

The first license was granted in 1873 to the First National or Dai-Ichi Bank, led by Shibusawa who had just left the Ministry. Only three more such banks had been created by 1875, however, because of the onerous convertibility conditions including a high reserve ratio.

== Amended National Banking Act (1876) ==
In 1876, the legislation was amended in a way that made the creation of new banks much easier, as banknotes no longer had to be convertible in gold and could be backed by national bonds. The four existing national banks were re-chartered on that new basis, and 149 more were created in 1877, 1878 and 1879. The banks were numbered according to the chronological order of their licensing, from the first (Dai-Ichi) to the 153rd National Bank.

The national banks issued identically designed convertible notes, which were effective in funding industry and progressively replaced government notes. These national banknotes imitated the design of American banknotes, although the name of the issuer was different for each.

== Other early Meiji banks ==
In 1876, the same year as the National Banking Act was amended to facilitate the establishment of national banks, the government also chartered Mitsui Bank as Japan's first private bank (Japanese: 私立銀行, shiritsu ginko), a legal form that allowed it to engage in commercial banking but not to issue banknotes.

Some traditional moneychangers, instead of converting their operations into officially chartered (national or private) banks, kept them unlicensed. The Meiji government referred to such operations as "quasi-banks".

By end-1881, 149 of the 153 national banks were still in operation, with total capital of 43.9 million yen (of which 17.8 million at the 15th National Bank alone); 90 private banks had been chartered, with total capital of 10.45 million; and at least 369 quasi-banks were in activity, with aggregate capital above 5.8 million.

== Transition to central banking ==
In 1877, the Satsuma Rebellion forced the government to have recourse to debt monetization that triggered severe inflation. This was controlled by the reduction of government spending and the removal of paper currency from circulation. During the rebellion, an original type of paper money was issued by the rebel leader Saigō Takamori in order to finance his war effort. In 1878, the National Banking Act was amended again, introducing a limit on banknote issuance, then introduced regional limits for each prefecture. In 1879, the aggregate limit of 34 million yen was reached and the government stopped chartering new national banks.

In 1881, national banks issued the first Japanese note to feature a portrait, the Empress Jingū note (神功皇后札).

In the early 1880s, Matsukata Masayoshi brought an end to the monetary system based on competing national banks of issue, in line with his deflationary policy orientation. In 1882, he established the Bank of Japan inspired by European experiences, more or less along the lines Yoshida had advocated a decade earlier. By end-1881, there had been 196 million yen of currency in circulation: 119 million were government notes, 34 million in national bank notes, and 43 million in coin. Matsukata redeemed the government notes in circulation, and allocated all new issuance to the Bank of Japan, initially notes convertible to silver.

In 1896, the Japanese national banking system was entirely phased out and the banks had to rename itself so that the adjective "national" would disappear from their name. Their conversion into ordinary banks was completed by 1899. Many of these banks, however, kept their "numbered" name, such as the First Bank, Fifteenth Bank, and Eighteenth Bank to name only a few. The 77 Bank is a rare case of a former national bank keeping its numbered name to this day.

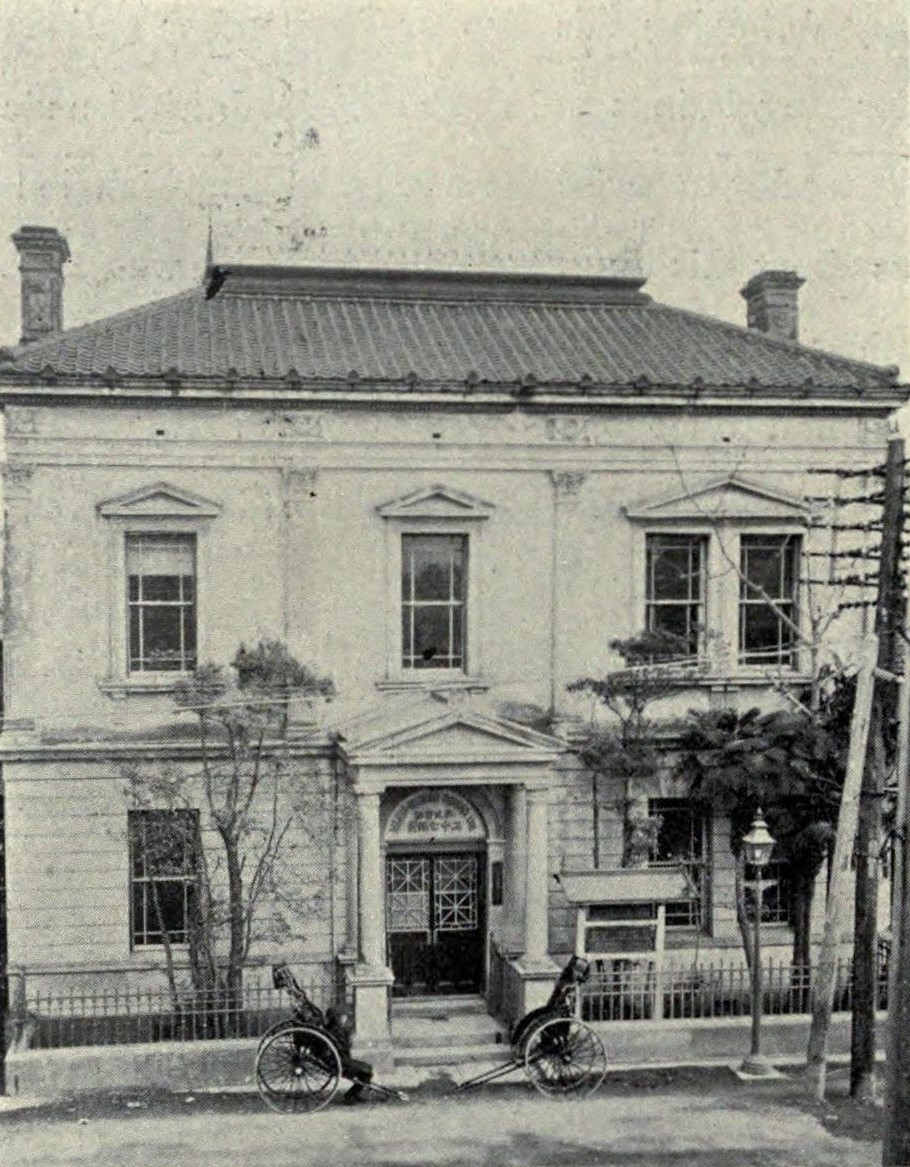
Twenty-seventh Bank building in Tokyo (1910)

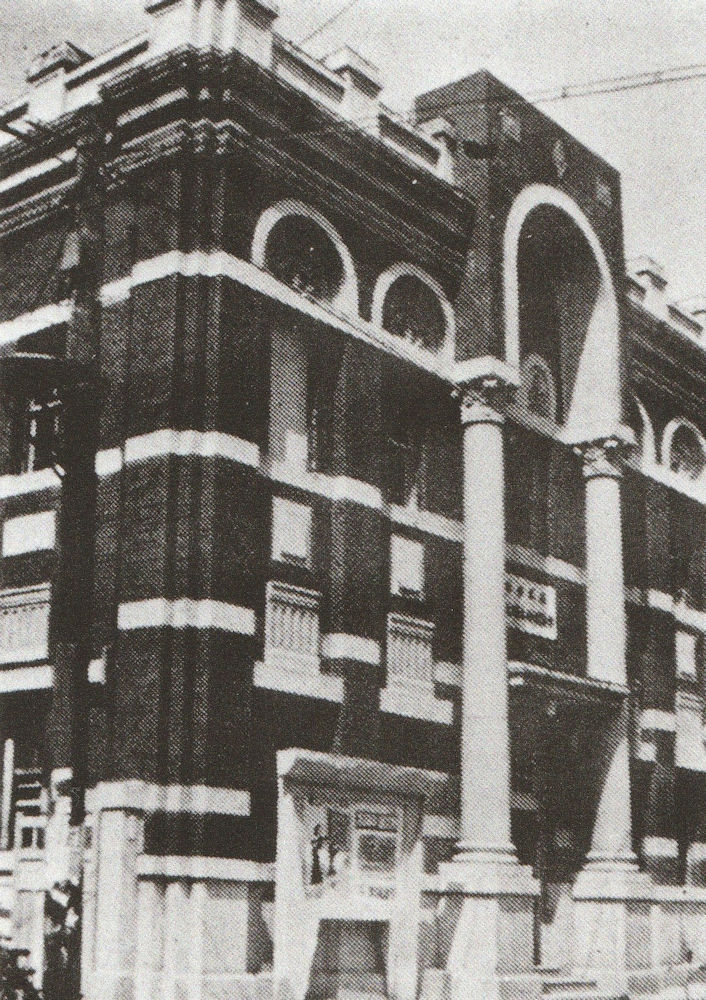
Fiftieth Bank building in Tsuchiura (1921)

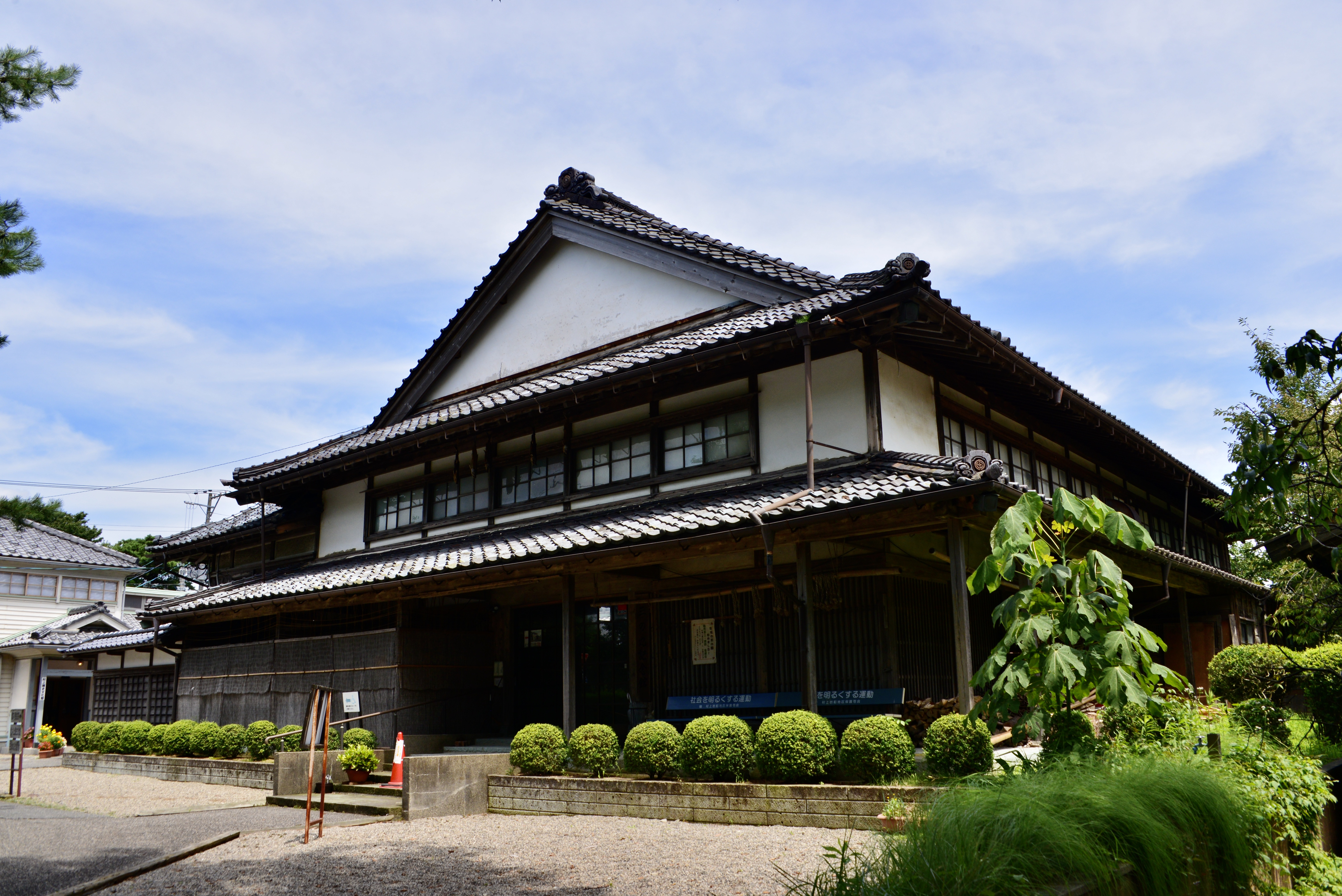
Former Seventy-first National Bank building in Murakami

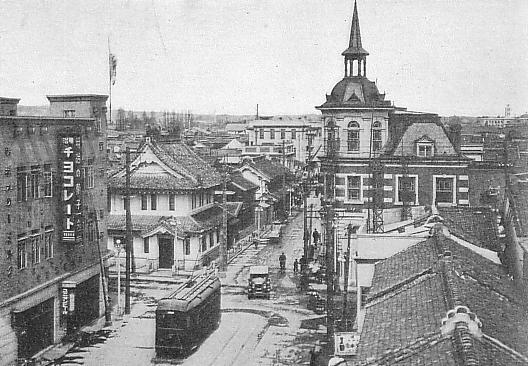
Seventy-seventh Bank building in Sendai (right, ca. 1930)

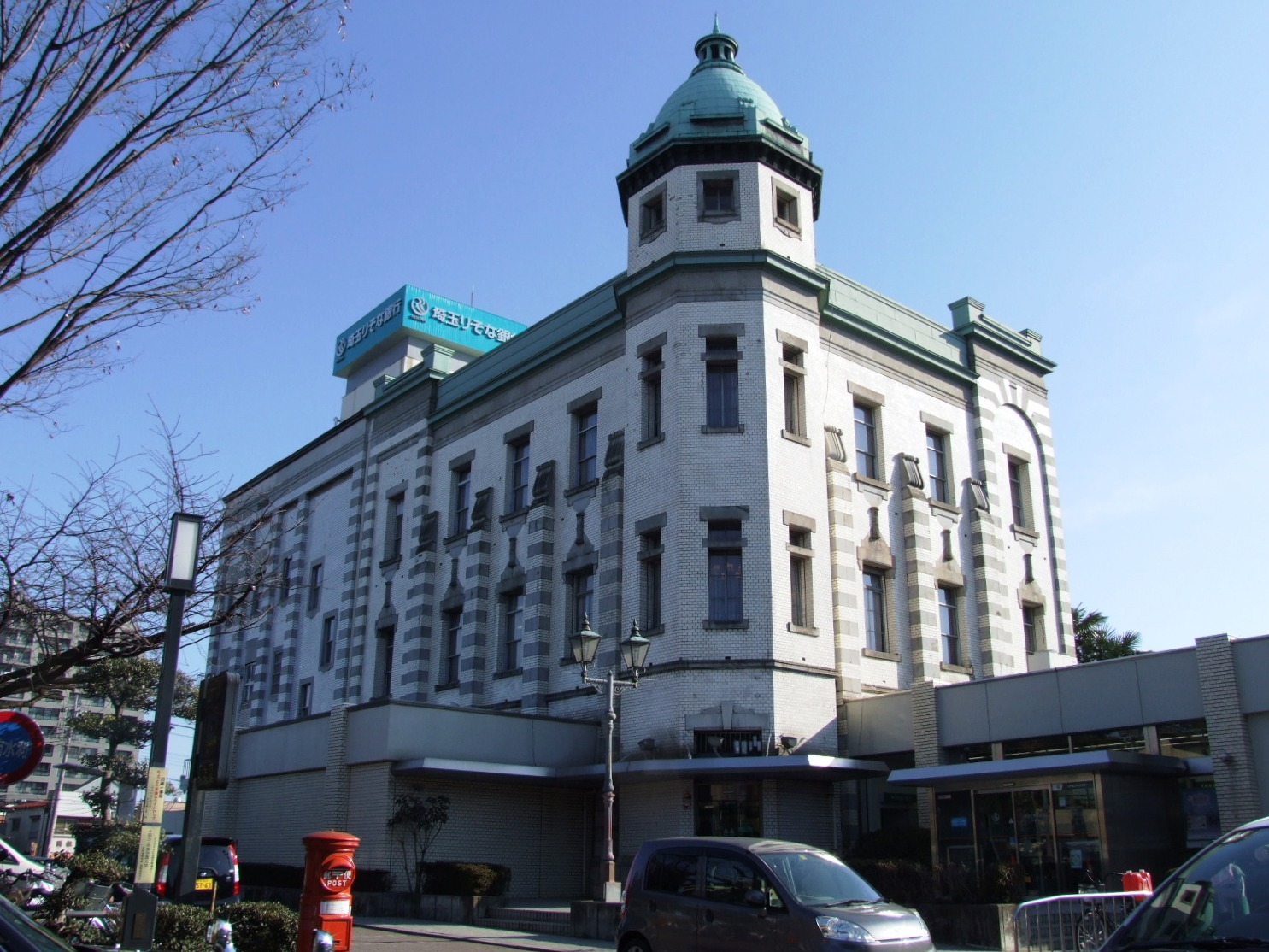
Former Eighty-fifth Bank building in Kawagoe

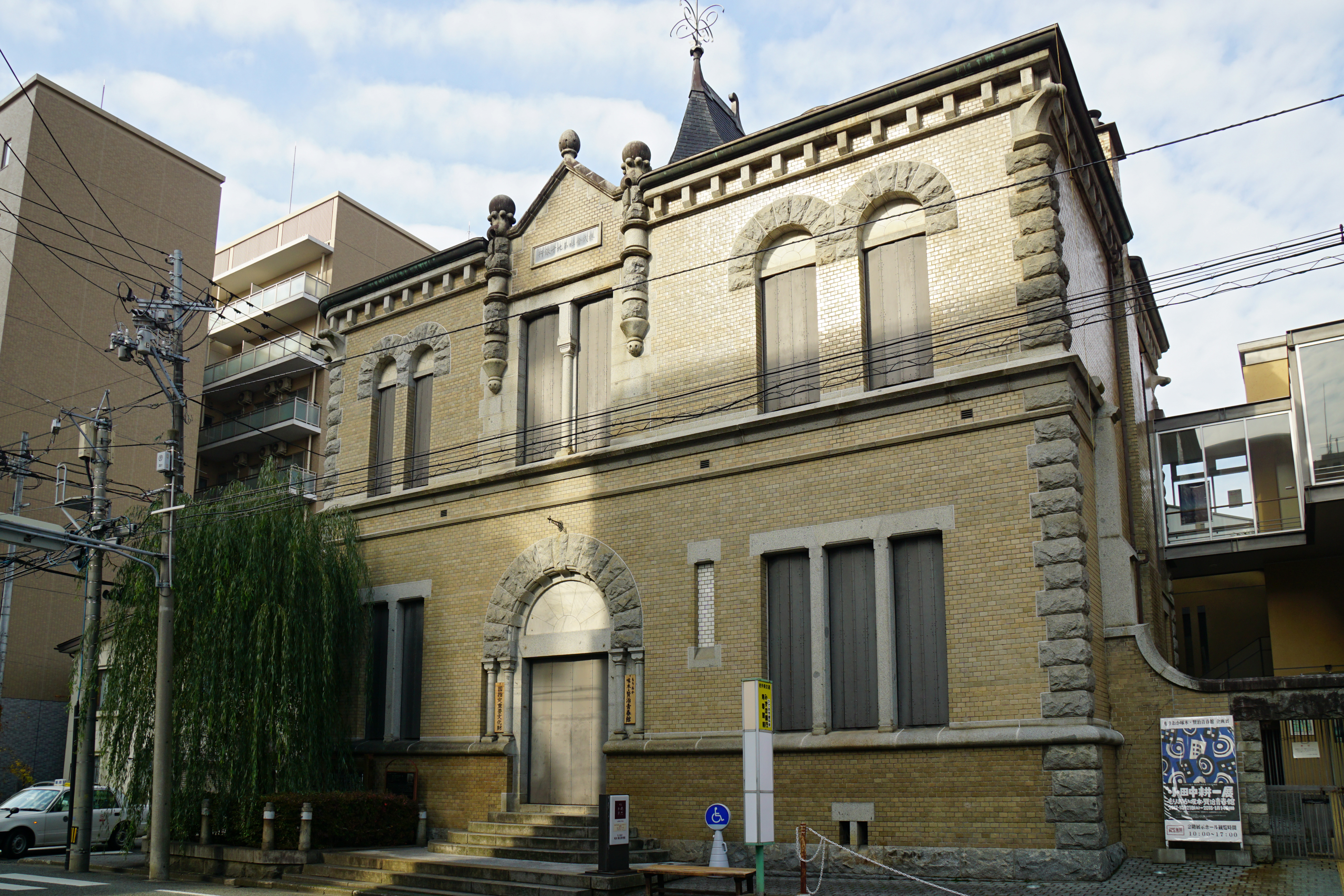
Former 90th National Bank building in Morioka

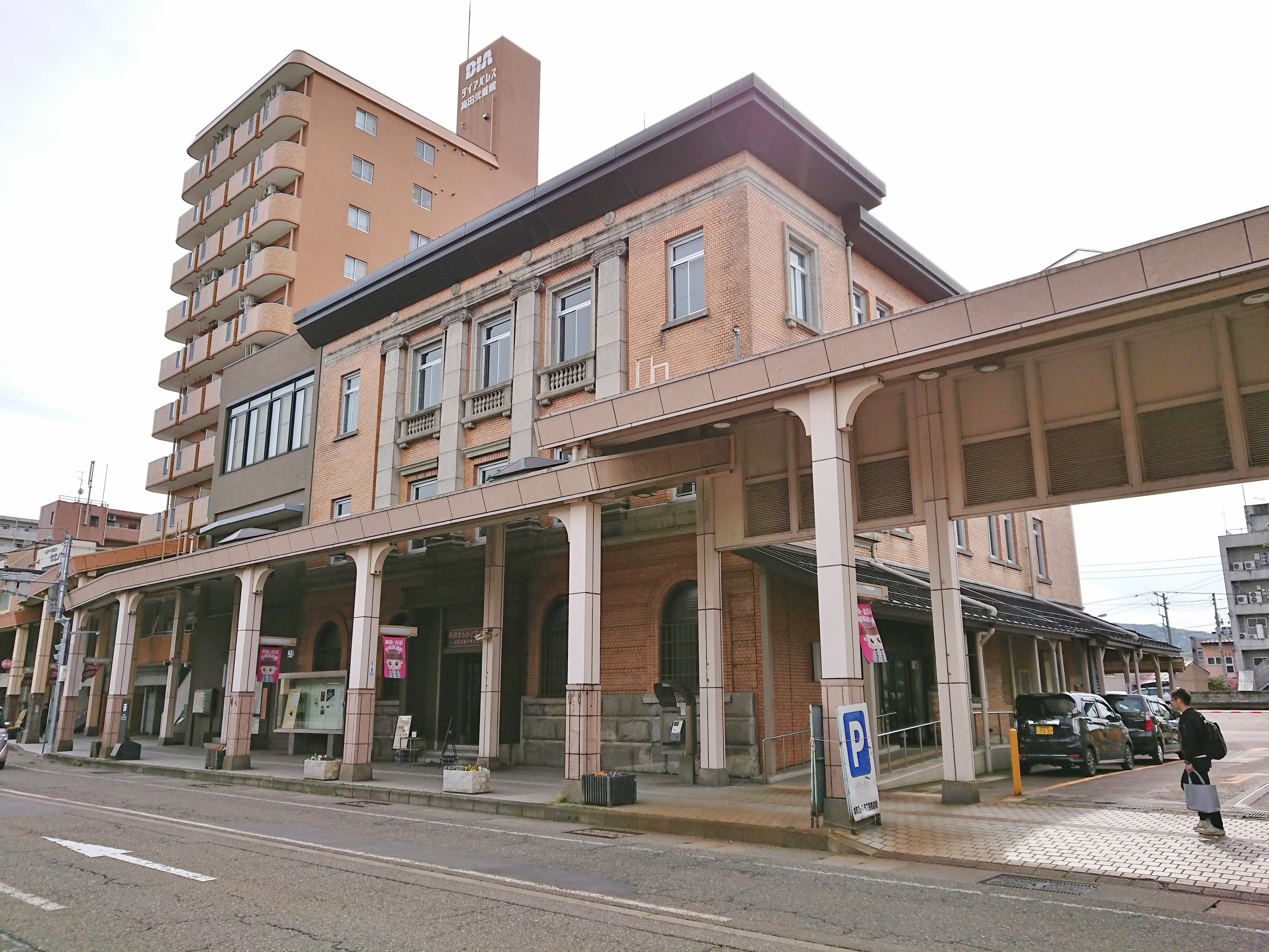
Former 139th National Bank building in Takada City

== See also ==
- Bank of issue
- Banques départementales in early 19C France
- List of banks in Japan
