= Eighteenth Bank =

Former Japanese bank

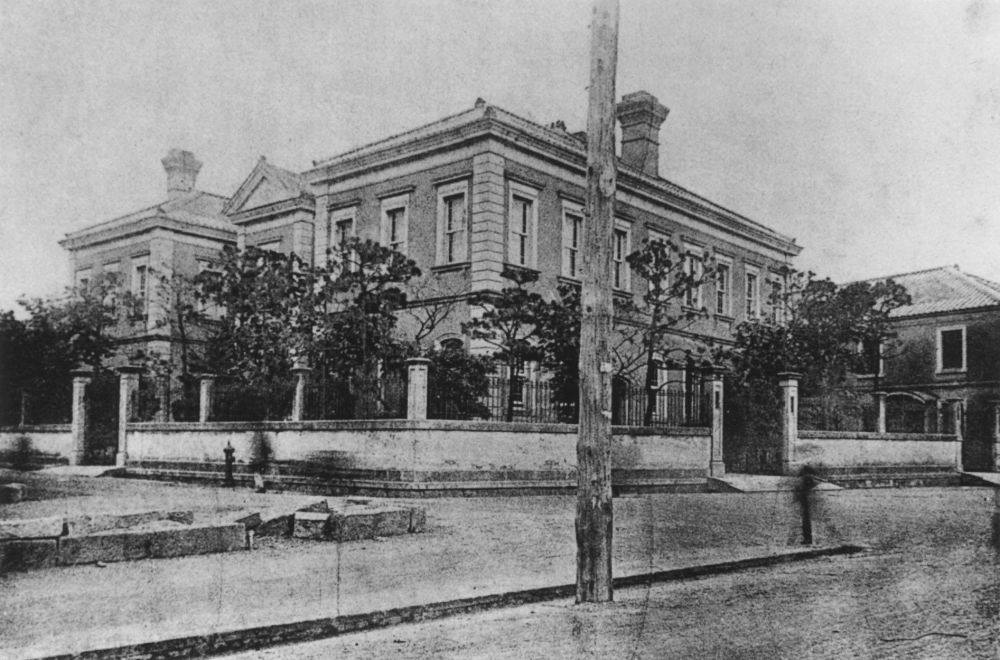
Head office in Nagasaki, photographed in 1889

The Eighteenth National Bank, from 1897 the Eighteenth Bank (Japanese: 十八銀行, Juhachi Ginko), was a Japanese bank headquartered in Nagasaki. Established in 1877, it was one of the National Banks in Meiji Japan which were numbered by chronological order of establishment. It was notable for its prominent activity in Korea from 1890 to 1936. It was eventually absorbed in 2019 by the Fukuoka Financial Group, following a protracted process initiated in 2016.

== Overview ==
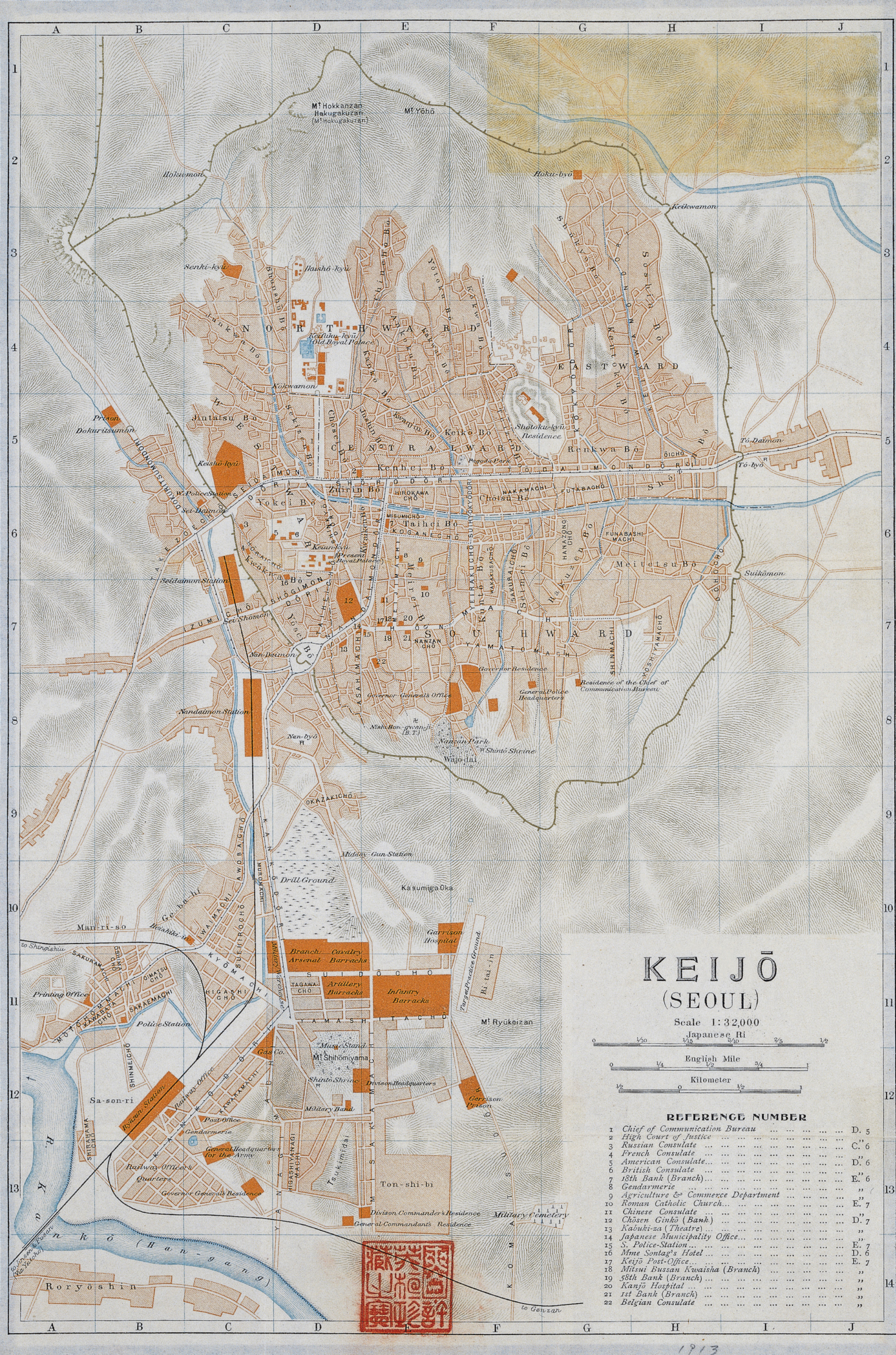
1913 map of Keijō, displaying the Gwangtonggwan building as a branch of the 18th Bank

Logo in 2018

The 18th National Bank was created in September 1877 in the turbulent context of the Satsuma Rebellion, on the initiative of prominent local merchants including Nagami Denzaburō and Matsuda Gengorō.

The 18th National Bank was the second significant Japanese bank, after the Dai-Ichi Bank of Shibusawa Eiichi, to establish a significant presence in Korea. It started in 1882 by issuing bills of exchange and making loans to Nagasaki merchants active in the Korea trade. Around the same time, the 102nd National Bank, a small institution that had been founded in 1878 on Tsushima Island, established an office in Busan, followed in 1887 by an operation from the Hirata delivery store in Wonsan which acted from the start as an agent for the 18th National Bank. In 1890, the 18th National Bank obtained authorization from the Japanese Finance Ministry to establish a first branch of its own in Incheon, which opened on 1 October 1890.. That same year, the 18th National Bank took over the former operations of the 102nd Bank, bankrupted as a consequence of political frictions between China and Japan. Further branches of the 18th National Bank followed in Wonsan in 1894 and Busan in 1897.

The 18th Bank absorbed Kuchinotsu Bank in 1919, Nagasaki Bank in 1927, Ariie Bank in 1929, Isahaya Bank in 1942, and Nagasaki Savings Bank in 1944. In 1936, its Korean branches were taken over by the Chōsen Industrial Bank.

By 2012, the Eighteenth Bank had 113 branches around Japan.

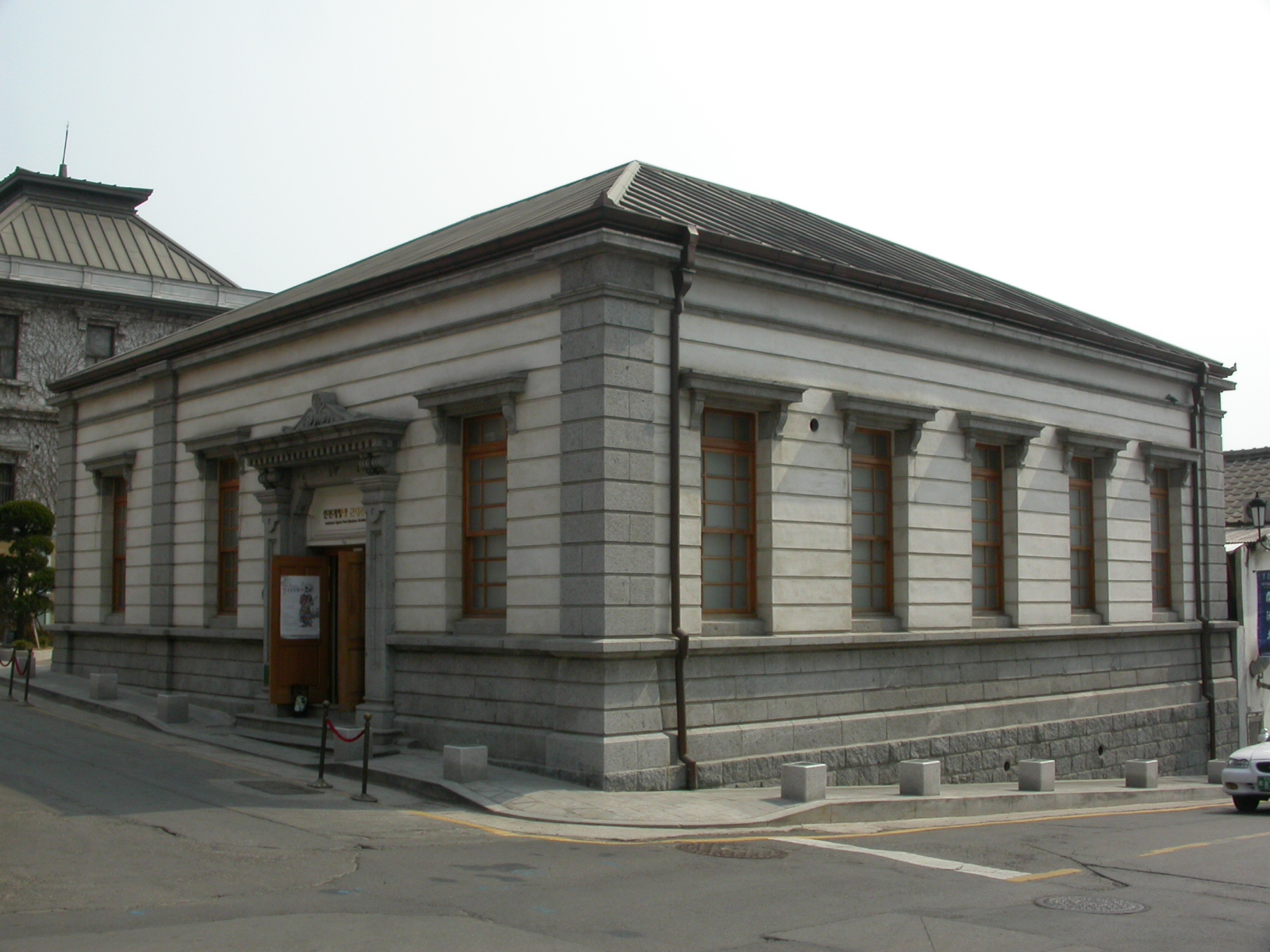
Former branch building in Incheon completed in 1903, repurposed as Incheon Open Port Modern Architecture Museum

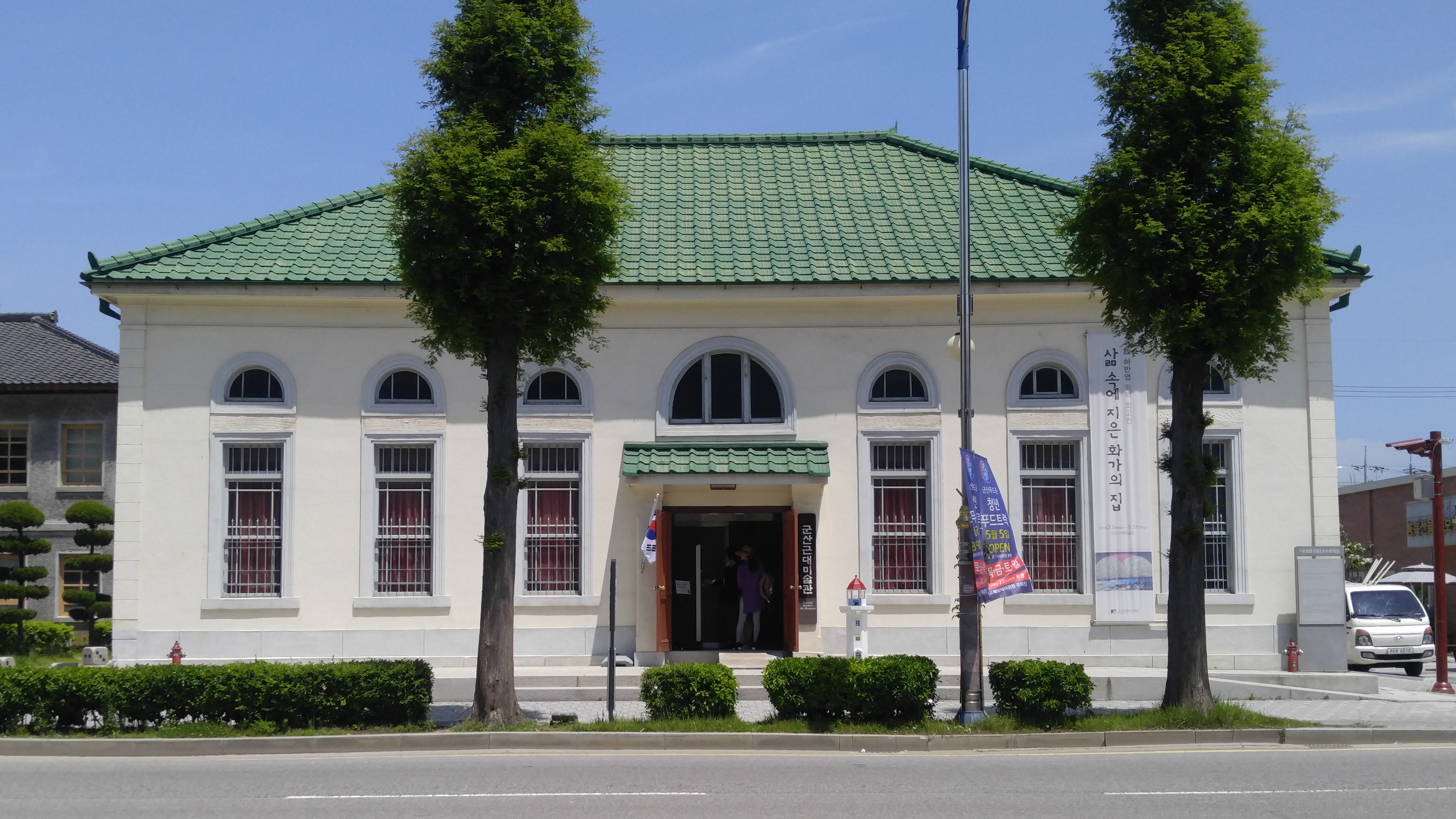
Former branch building in Gunsan completed in 1907, repurposed as Modern Art Museum

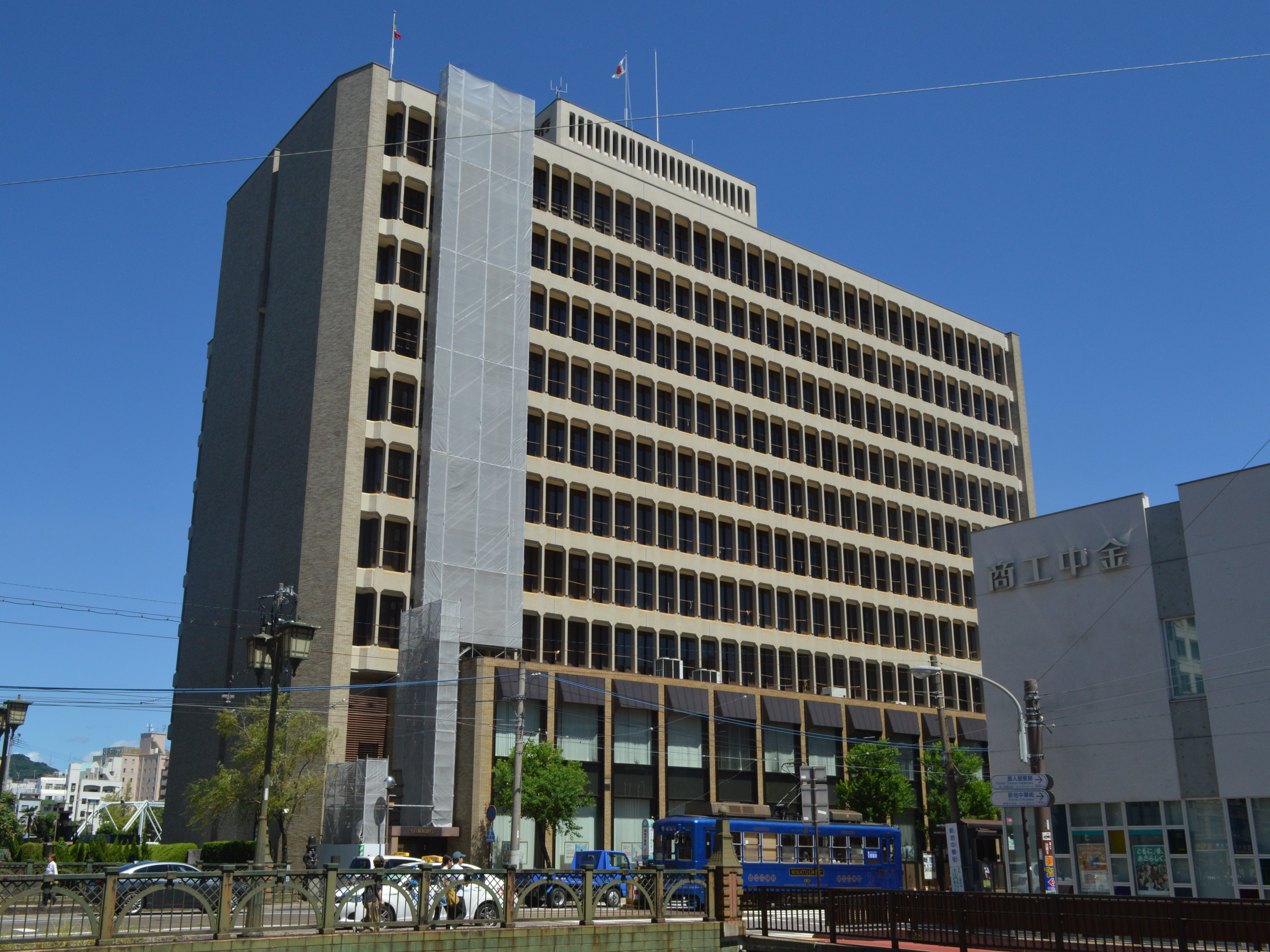
Former head office building in Nagasaki completed in 1969

== See also ==
- Fifteenth Bank
- The 77 Bank
