= Fifteenth Bank =

Former Japanese bank

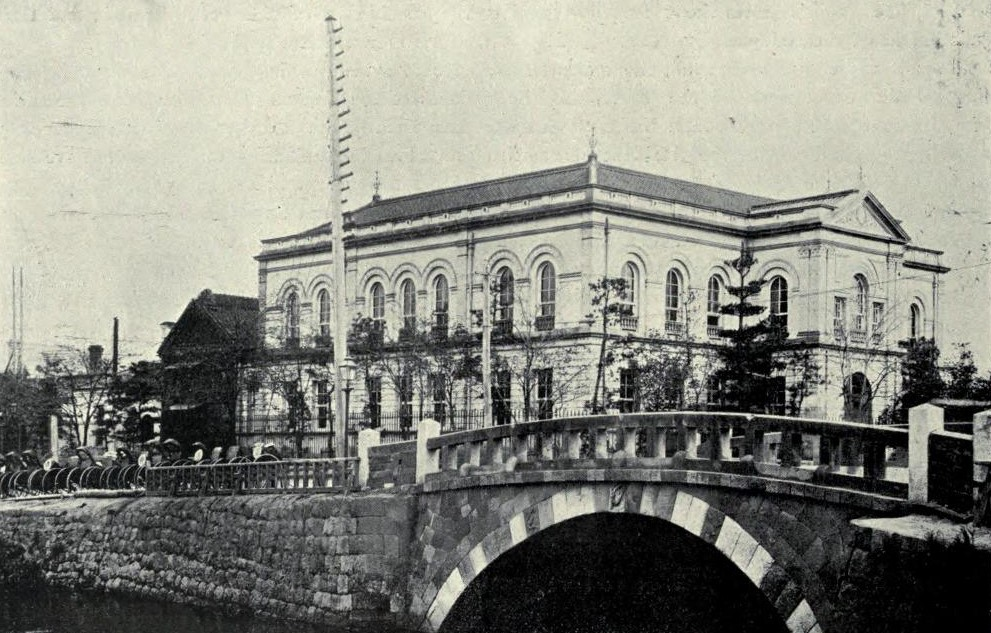
- Head office in Tokyo, photographed in 1910
- Native name: 十五銀行
- Formerly: Fifteenth National Bank
- Company type: Private company
- Industry: Financial services
- Founded: 1877
- Founder: A group of high-ranking Japanese nobility
- Defunct: 1944
- Fate: Absorbed
- Successor: Teikoku Bank and then SMBC Group
- Headquarters: Tokyo, Japan
- Area served: Japan
- Products: Banking services

The Fifteenth National Bank, from 1897 the Fifteenth Bank (Japanese: 十五銀行, Jugo Ginko) was a Japanese bank that operated between 1877 and 1944.

It was established in 1877 in Tokyo and was initially the largest of the early National Banks in Meiji Japan. Its failure in 1927 was a climactic point of the Shōwa financial crisis. It was subsequently reorganized by the Japanese government, and eventually absorbed in 1944 by the Teikoku Bank, itself a predecessor of SMBC Group.

== History ==
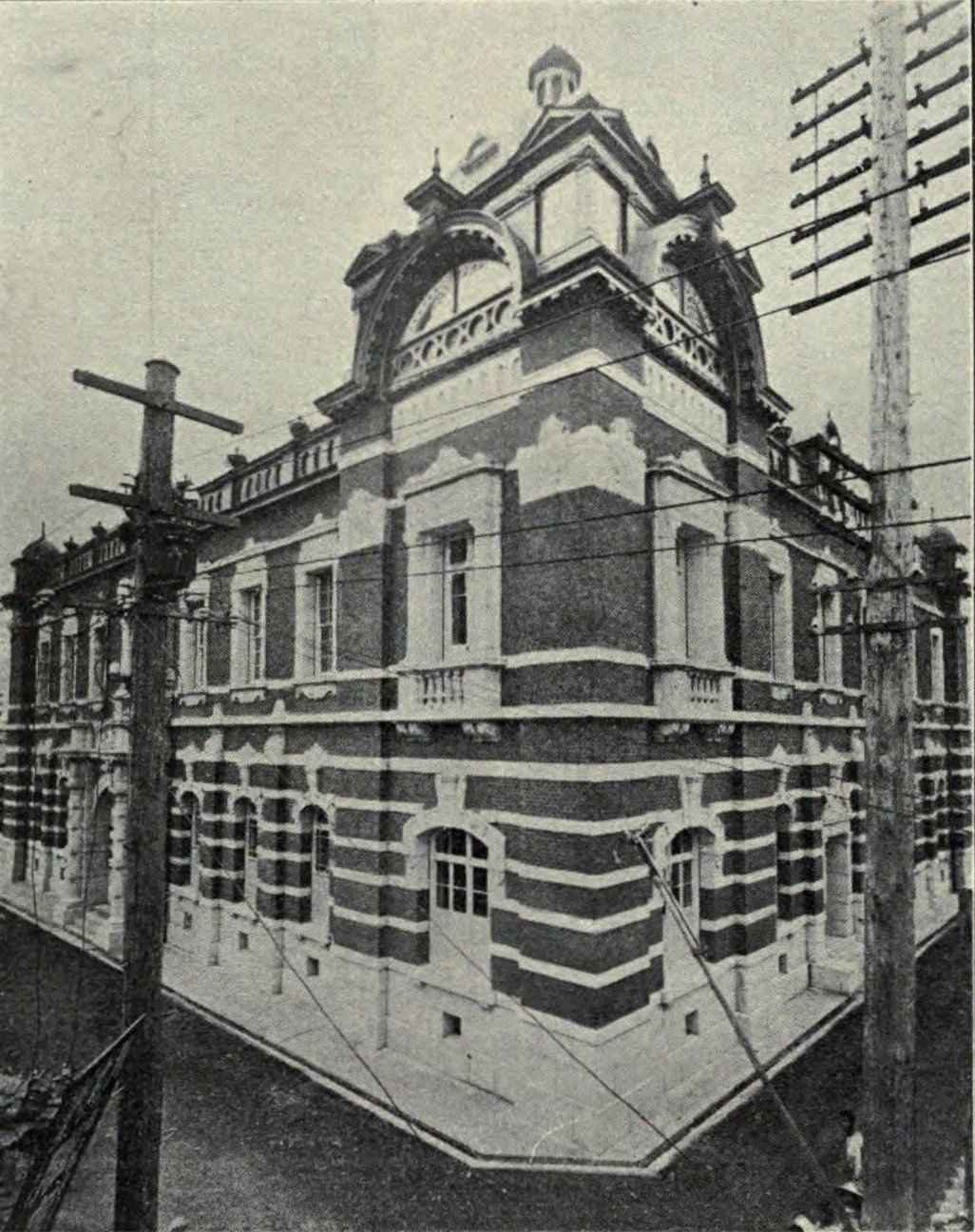
Head office building of Naniwa Bank in Osaka, photographed in 1910

The 15th National Bank was established by a group of high-ranking nobility including Iwakura Tomomi, Tokugawa Yoshikatsu, Yamauchi Toyonori, Kuroda Nagatomo, Ikeda Akimasa, Tōdō Takakiyo, Matsudaira Mochiaki, Nanbu Toshiyuki, and Yoshikawa Tsunetake, and was therefore colloquially known as the "Kazoku Bank". Its first president was Mori Motonori. With an initial capital of 17.8 million yen, it was by far the largest Japanese bank, with its capital representing 44.5 percent of the total capital of all national banks. Immediately after its creation, it provided funding to the Japanese government during the Satsuma Rebellion.

In 1920, the 15th Bank absorbed Naniwa Bank (est. 1878 in Osaka as the 32nd National Bank), Kobe Kawasaki Bank (est. 1903 in Kobe), and Choyou Bank (est. 1897 in Tokyo). The bank still carried considerable prestige in the 1920s until its abrupt failure. By early 1927, half of its large loans and 30 percent of its total lending were to businesses associated with the Matsukata family, which was also its controlling shareholder and whose patriarch Matsukata Masayoshi had died in 1924 at 89 years. In total, 322 of its shareholders were members of the nobility, with the Ministry of the Imperial Household and the head of the treasury also holding large numbers of shares, and the Imperial Household Ministry's main treasury was held at the bank. The 15th Bank's president was Duke Matsukata Iwao, the eldest son of Matsukata Masayoshi.

On 21 April 1927, the 15th Bank announced a three-day suspension of its operations following a disorderly bank run. Many samurai and aristocratic families used the information networks of their former retainers to transfer their assets elsewhere before the bankruptcy, but even so, aristocratic families suffered great losses. The Imperial Household Ministry had designated the bank's shares as hereditary property, which made them hard to sell, compounding the crisis. Matsukata Iwao sold off most of his personal assets to support his failing bank and, on 29 November 1927, offered to surrender his title to the Imperial Household Ministry. Marquis Asano Nagayuki, a director of the bank, also offered personal assets for the bank's reorganization. In December 1927, the Japanese government announced a plan to reopen the bank in the following spring, with full repayment of deposits under 100 yen per account and only partial repayment above that threshold.

The first Ginza Mitsui Building was erected in 1972 on the site of the 15th Bank's former head office in Tokyo.

== See also ==
- Dai-Ichi Bank (the First National Bank)
- Eighteenth Bank
- The 77 Bank
