= Dai-Ichi Bank =

Former Japanese bank

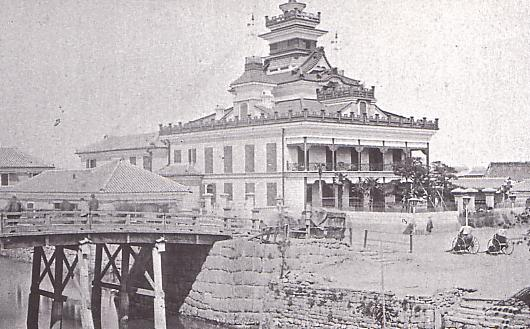
First National Bank Building in Kabutocho, Tokyo, erected in 1872 for the Mitsui trading house and used by Dai-Ichi Bank from 1873, photographed before 1875

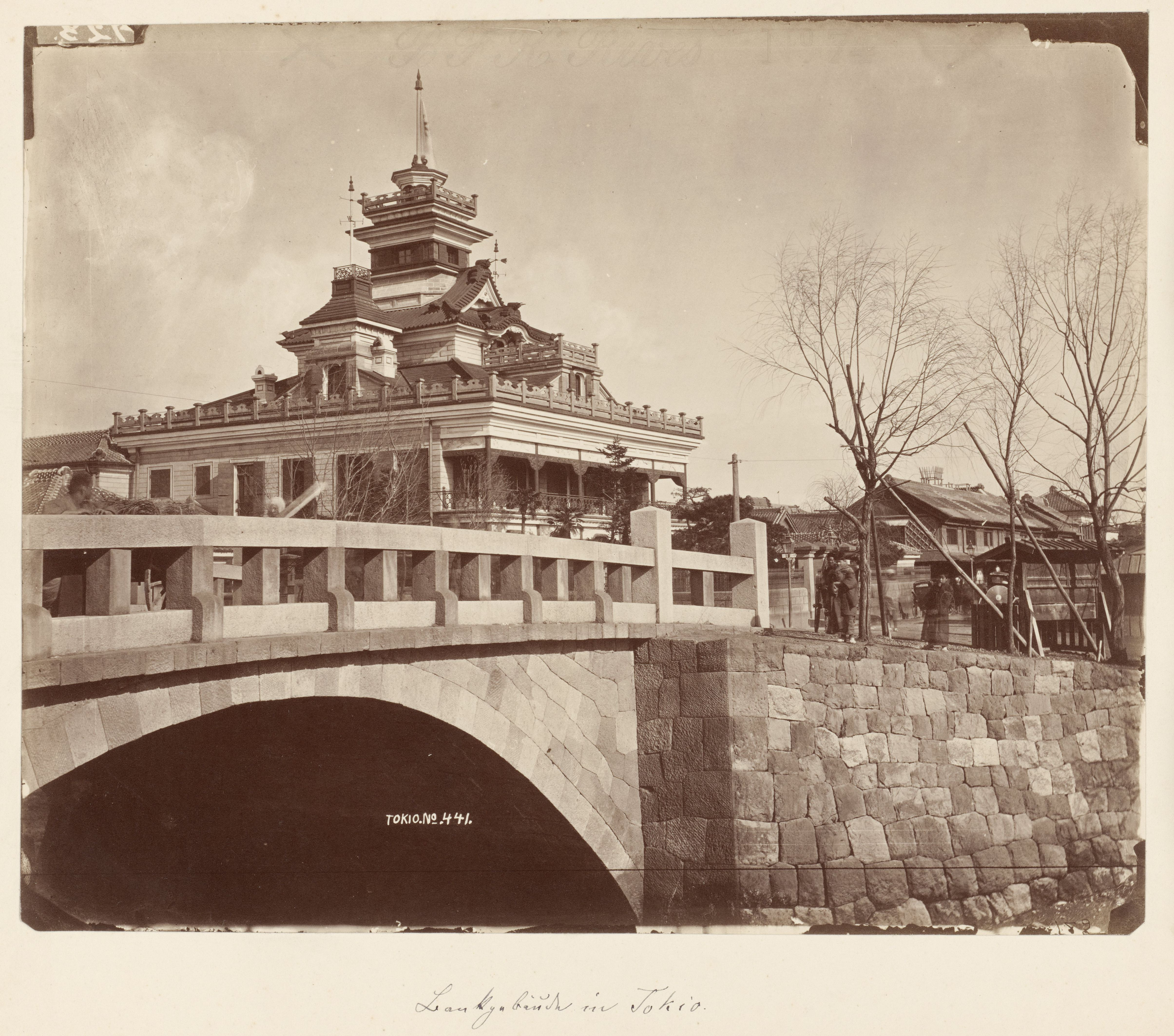
Photograph taken after reconstruction of the Kaiun bridge in stone in 1875, late 19th century

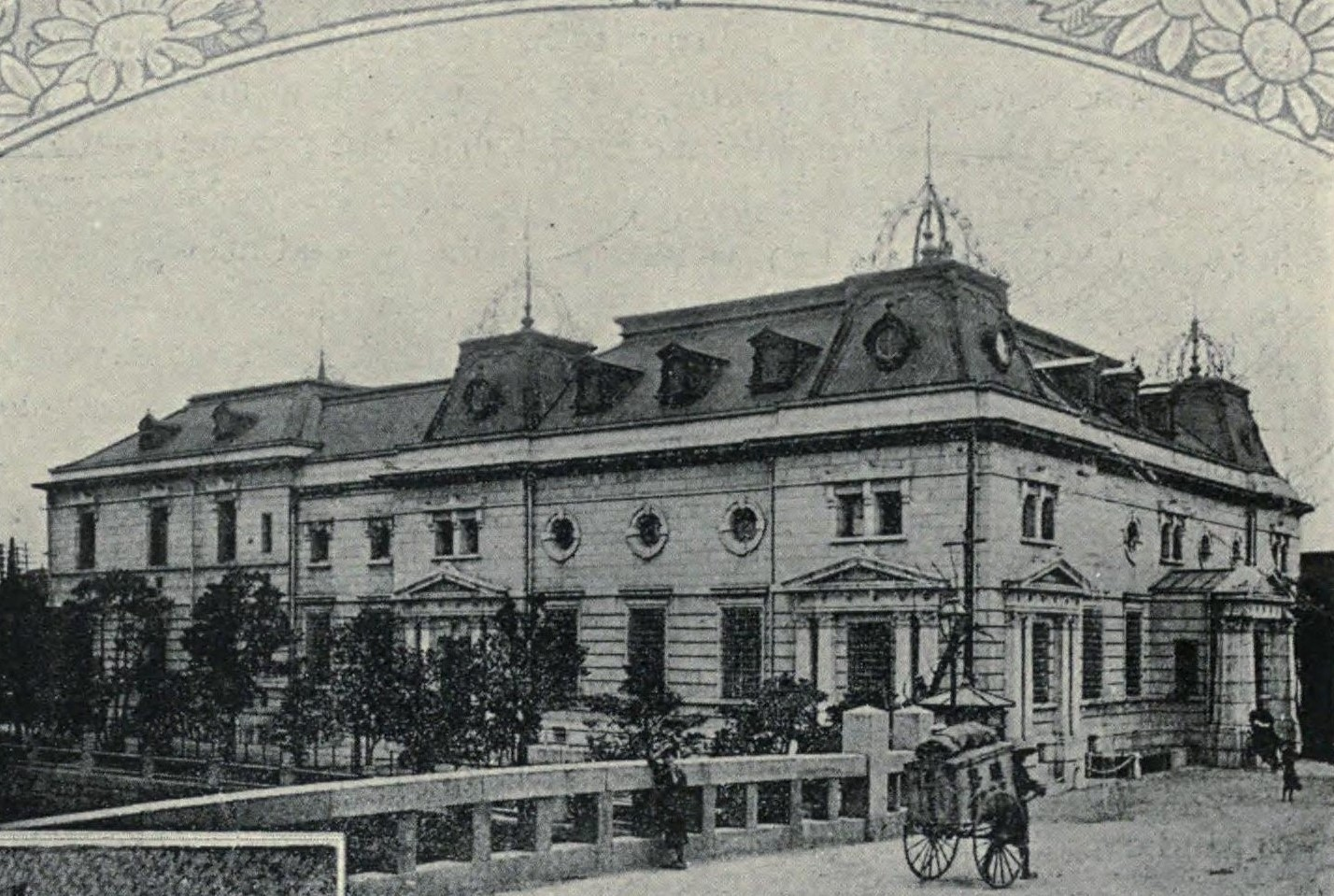
Tokyo head office after reconstruction on the same site, photographed in 1910

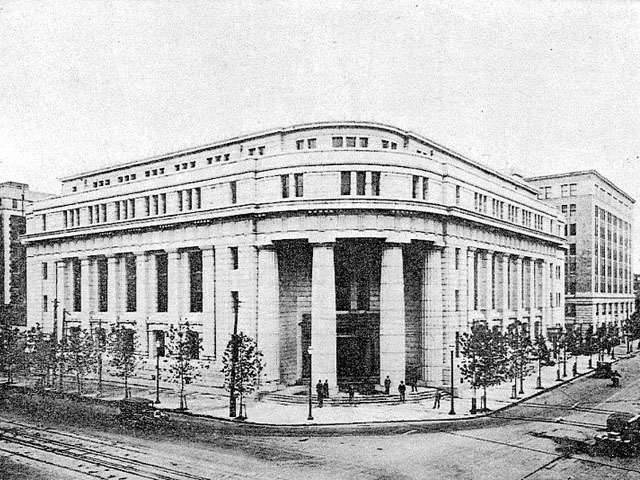
Tokyo head office after relocation to Marunouchi, photographed in 1931

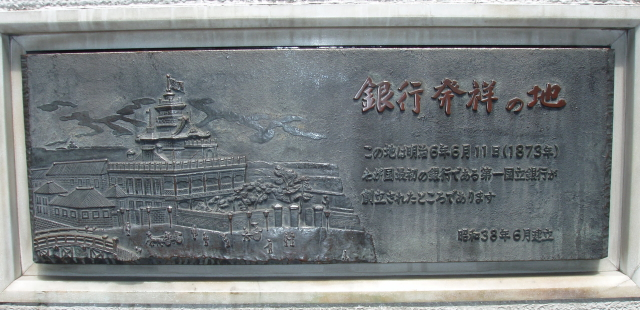
"Japanese Banking Birthplace" plaque memorializing the original Mitsui / Dai-Ichi Bank building in Nihonbashi, Tokyo

The Dai-Ichi Bank (Japanese: 第一銀行, lit. 'First Bank'), known from its establishment in 1873 to 1896 as Dai-Ichi Kokuritsu Bank (lit. 'First National Bank') was a major Japanese bank headquartered in Tokyo. Founded and developed for several decades by Shibusawa Eiichi, it expanded into Korea as early as 1878, and became that country's dominant bank as well as its bank of issue in the early 1900s, before handing over that role to the newly established Bank of Korea in 1909. It remained one of the main Japanese banks together with Mitsubishi Bank, Mitsui Bank, Sumitomo Bank, and Yasuda / Fuji Bank.

In 1943, Dai-Ichi Bank merged with Mitsui Bank to form Teikoku Bank (Japanese: 帝国銀行, lit. 'Imperial Bank'). In 1948, Dai-Ichi Bank was spun off again from Teikoku, which retook the Mitsui name in 1954. In 1971, it merged with Nippon Kangyo Bank to form the Dai-Ichi Kangyo Bank, subsequently Japan's largest bank and a predecessor to Mizuho Financial Group.

== Beginnings ==
In 1872, the Mitsui and Ōno merchant families created the Mitsui-Ōno Joint Bank as a joint venture between their respective financial operations. To manage it, they hired Shibusawa Eiichi, until then an official at the Ministry of Finance where he had drafter the National Banking Decree of December 1872 under the leadership of minister Ōkubo Toshimichi. In 1873, with the decree's entry into force allowing the licensing of privately owned banks of issue, Shibusawa reorganized the venture and obtained from the government a license to operate it as the first of all Japan's national banks, thus its original name Tokyo Dai-Ichi Kokuritsu Ginkō (lit. 'First National Bank of Tokyo') It was also the country's first joint-stock company or kabushiki gaisha.

Dai-Ichi National Bank issued 753,195 yen in its own banknotes in 1873, and its banknote circulation peaked at over 1 million yen by mid-1874. After that, it struggled to maintain its notes in circulation because many of them were redeemed in specie. In 1875, the Ōno family was bankrupted. Mitsui Hachirōemon became the bank's dominant shareholder, but he was unwilling to use it as a vehicle for his business strategy and was further annoyed by the forced transfer of his firm's iconic building to the Dai-Ichi Bank at the instigation of the Japanese government. By end-1876, the bank was still majority-owned by the Mitsui family but it was increasingly taking an independent course under the leadership of Shibusawa who had meanwhile built up a significant minority stake. Unlike most of Japan's early joint-stock banks who were fiercely local, Dai-Ichi also managed to attract equity investors from a wide geographical area. It simultaneously diversified its deposit base from an initial heavy reliance on public funds; these represented 70 percent of all deposits in late 1875, but only 20 percent a year later.

Dai-Ichi, like all other national banks, was stripped of its Japanese banknote issuance privilege in 1883, shortly after the establishment of the Bank of Japan.

== Expansion in Korea ==
The Japan–Korea Treaty of 1876 opened a period during which Japan enjoyed a near-monopoly on Korea's overseas trade, as the country's trade with Japan expanded dramatically while its trade with China collapsed. Dai-Ichi rapidly seized that opportunity and secured a dominant position in the country’s financial sector, thanks to Japanese Finance Ministry protection. It opened a first Korean branch in Busan in June 1878, for which the Japanese government lent it half of the 100,000 yen needed for start-up expenses. This episode has been described as the starting point both of Japanese-Korean financial relations and of modern banking in Korea. Further branches followed in Wonsan (May 1880), Incheon (November 1882), Seoul (1888), Mokpo (1898), and Chinnampo and Gunsan (1903).

Tariffs were not specified in the 1876 treaty and were only agreed upon in 1883. On that occasion Paul Georg von Möllendorff, a German adviser to the Korean royal court, negotiated a $24,000 loan (denominated in Mexican silver dollars) from Dai-Ichi National Bank to finance the setup costs of the Korean Customs Service, which was collateralized with future tariff revenue. That same year, Dai-Ichi Bank received permission from the Japanese government that its bills be used to pay for customs duties in Korea's open ports. In February 1884, Dai-ichi Bank and von Möllendorff agreed that the bank's branches would collect all local customs duties on behalf of the Joseon dynasty government. Dai-Ichi Bank's $24,000 loan to the Korean government was disbursed simultaneously; it was followed by a second loan in January 1895 and a third in March 1900.

In May 1886, Dai-Ichi Bank secured funding from the newly established Bank of Japan to collect gold and silver in Korea for the benefit of Japan, which at the time still lacked sources of precious metals. Purchases of gold became an important component of Dai-Ichi Bank's Korean business, with yearly volumes fluctuating between 2,400 and 3,600 tons between 1901 and 1907.

Towards the end of the 19th century, Dai-Ichi Bank's near-monopoly on banking activities in Korea had been eroded by the belated entry of other Japanese banks, such as the Eighteenth Bank from 1890 onwards, and also by the gradual appearance of homegrown Korean banks such as Hanseong Bank, established in 1897. Instead, Dai-Ichi Bank played an increasingly central role in the reform of Korea's monetary system, for which the Korean government became acutely dependent on Japanese actions.. In mid-1898, Shibusawa traveled to Korea to negotiate the revocation of an earlier prohibition by the newly proclaimed Korean Empire of using stamped silver yen coins that had become important for the bank's business. At the turn of the century, Dai-Ichi Bank started to issue sight bills to facilitate its collection of customs duties, and in October 1901 applied for permission from the Japanese Finance Ministry for its Korean branches to issue yen-denominated banknotes, which the ministry granted in May 1902. Meanwhile, Dai-Ichi Bank remained the dominant financier of the Korean government, despite Emperor Gojong's attempt to foster an alternative system with the foundation of Daehan Cheon-il Bank in early 1899. In the autumn of 1900, difficult loan negotiations with the Korean government required another trip to Korea by Shibusawa; Dai-Ichi Bank made more loans to the Korean Empire in the early 1900s. In total, the share of Korea in the bank's total loan book rose from 2 percent in 1879 to over 15 percent by in 1905, and its share of Dai-Ichi Bank's total profits reached 29 percent in 1905.

Attempts by the embattled Korean state to resist Dai-Ichi's monetary role in Korea proved futile, and crumbled as the Russo-Japanese War resulted in the elimination of the last check against Japanese dominant influence in the country. In early 1903, officials in the Korean capital attempted to prohibit the use by Koreans of Dai-Ichi's banknotes, but had to rescind the order after a fortnight. In January 1905, the Korean authorities conceded unlimited circulation of Dai-Ichi banknotes in exchange for another loan, which practically designated Dai-Ichi Bank as the central bank of the Korean Empire. Dai-Ichi's banknote issuance expanded rapidly, from a total under 5 million years over the three years 1902–1904 to over 8 million in 1905 alone, then gradually increasing to reach nearly 12 million yen in 1909.

Following the Japan–Korea Treaty of 1905 which reduced the Korean Empire to a Japanese protectorate, the dominant status of Dai-Ichi Bank in Korea became a matter of renewed debate, this time among Japanese. In August 1907, Japan's Resident-General Itō Hirobumi and Shibusawa agreed that Dai-Ichi's operations should be eventually transferred to a dedicated central bank for the territory. A debate ensued between Itō and the Japanese finance ministry, with the latter favoring the creation of a Korean branch of the Bank of Japan over that of a stand-alone colonial institution over which Tokyo would have less direct control. Eventually Itō's position won the debate, and the finance ministry rationalized the decision as preferable to preserve financial stability. The new institution, originally named the Bank of Korea (Japanese: 韓國銀行, romanized: Kankoku Ginkō, Korean: 한국은행, romanized: Hanguk Eunhaeng), was created by Japanese law of July 1909, largely modelled on the Bank of Taiwan (est. 1898) but with a greater role for Itō in its governance than in the Taiwanese precedent. Dai-Ichi Bank kept branches in Seoul and Busan but later in 1909 transferred all its other Korean branches and offices to the Bank of Korea, totalling 220 regular employees and 121 support staff, in Chinnampo, Gunsan, Incheon, Mokpo and Wonsan (see above) plus those established in the meantime in Daegu, Hamhung, Kaesong, Kyongsong, Masan, Pyongyang, Songjin, and across the Yalu River in Andong. The transfer also included the new building initially planned by Dai-Ichi Bank for itself in Seoul, then still under construction and which became the Bank of Korea's head office. Following the Japan–Korea Treaty of 1910 and full annexation, the Bank of Korea was renamed the Bank of Chōsen in 1911. It was the direct predecessor of today's Bank of Korea.

Overall, Dai-Ichi Bank's actions in the three decades following its first Busan establishment in 1878 have led to its depiction as the "primary agent of Japanese financial imperialism" in Korea.

== Later developments ==
In 1943, Dai-ichi Bank and Mitsui Bank, a Mitsui zaibatsu company, merged to form Teikoku Bank (lit. Imperial Bank of Japan). Teikoku Bank was the largest bank in Japan in terms of assets when it was inaugurated. Teikoku Bank, however, could not expand its business freely due to Japan's involvement in World War II. Furthermore, former Dai-ichi employees and Mitsui employees did not get along well because of the difference in corporate culture between them. As a result of deteriorating performance, Teikoku Bank was divided into two banks, the new Dai-Ichi Bank and the new Teikoku Bank in 1948.

Dai-Ichi grew dynamically in Japan's rapid postwar economic expansion, and eventually merged in 1971 with Nippon Kangyo Bank to form Dai-Ichi Kangyo Bank.

== Branches ==
Dai-Ichi Bank's first Korean branch was opened in 1878 in Chemulpo (now Incheon). A proper branch building was erected there from 1887 to 1899, and after 1909 became the Incheon of the Bank of Chōsen, then after 1950 of the Bank of Korea. It then housed various government administrations before being repurposed in 2010 as the Incheon Open Port Museum.

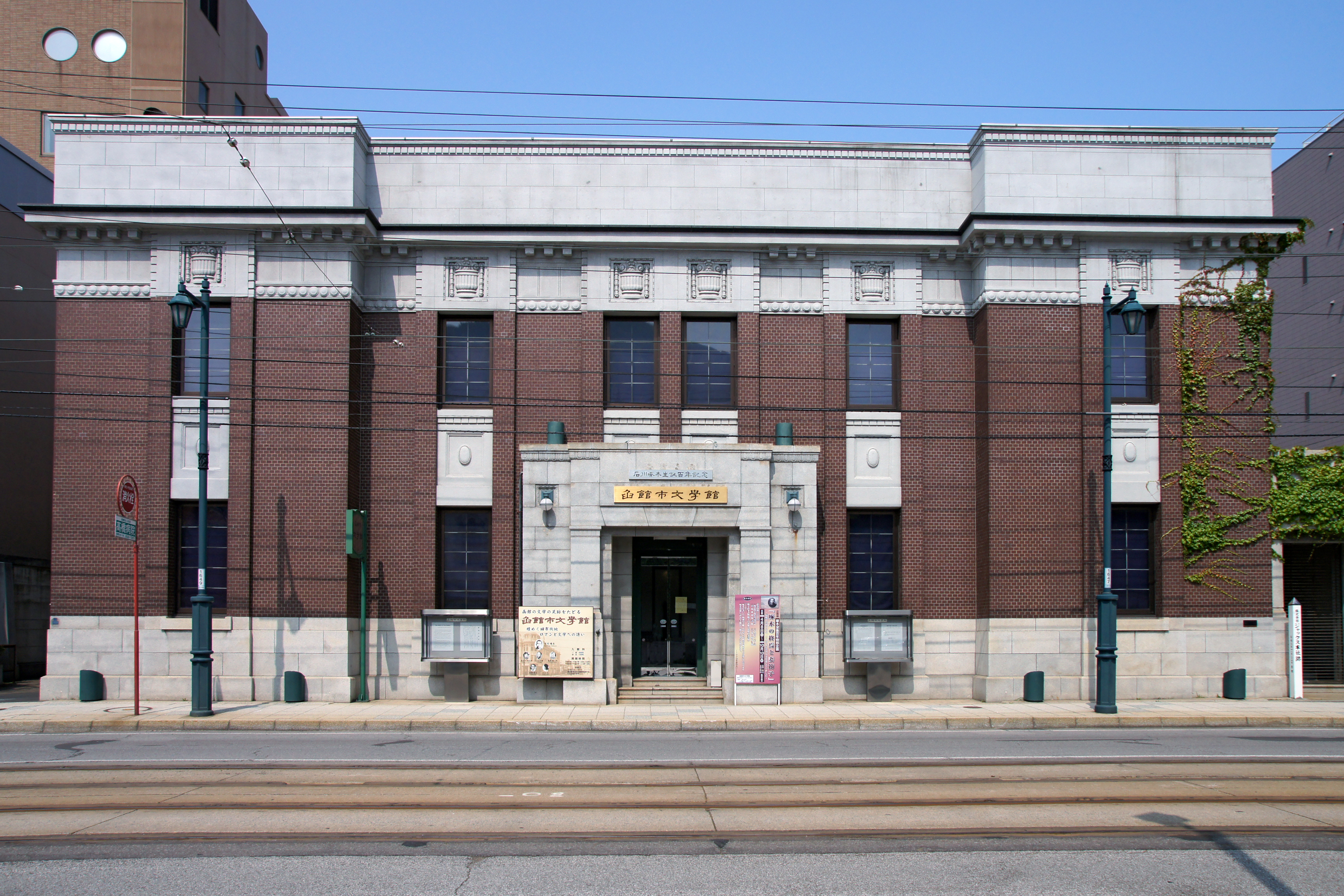
Former branch in Hakodate, built in 1921, lately the Hakodate City Museum of Literature

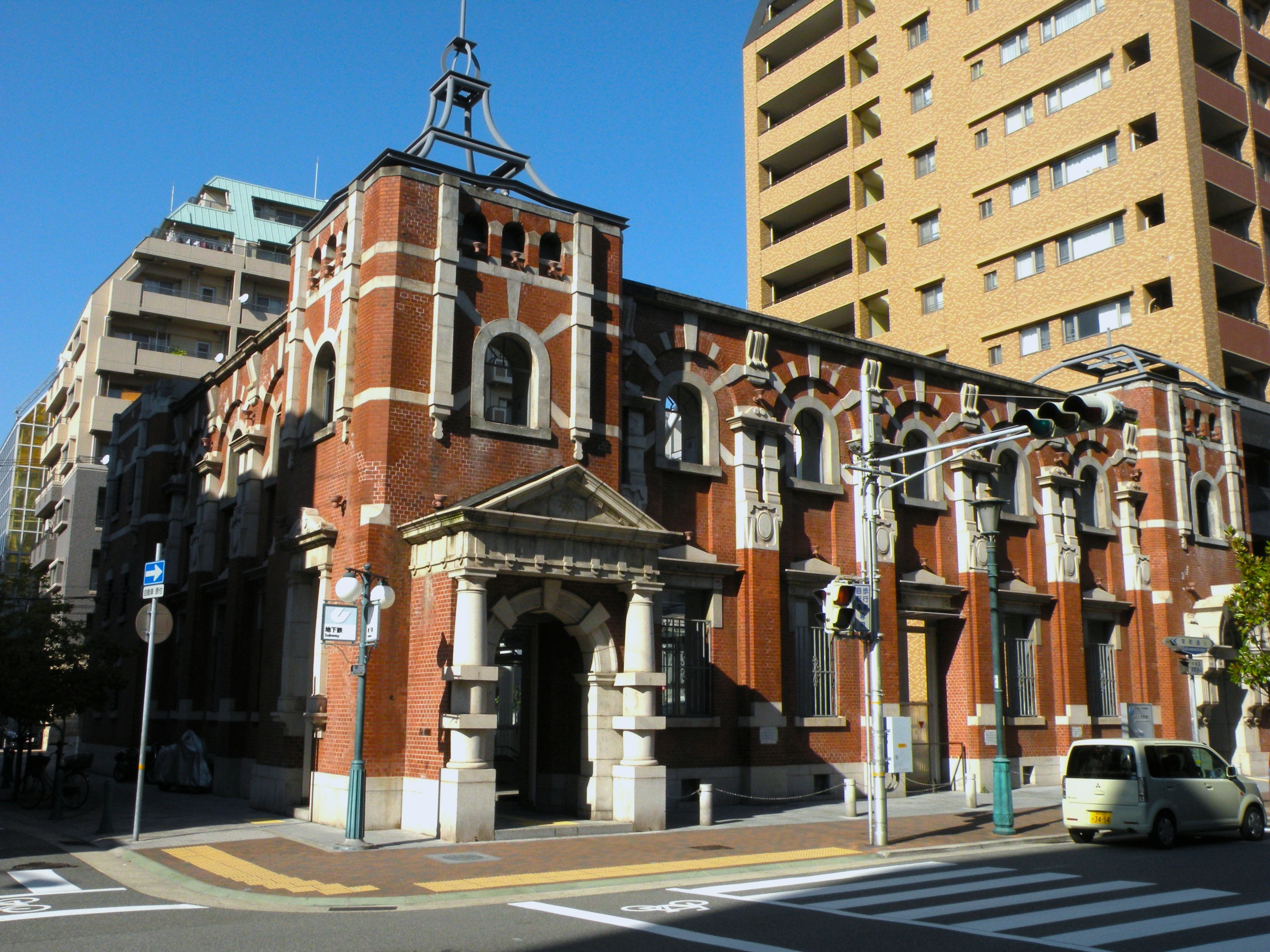
Former branch in Kobe, partly reconstructed following the Great Hanshin earthquake

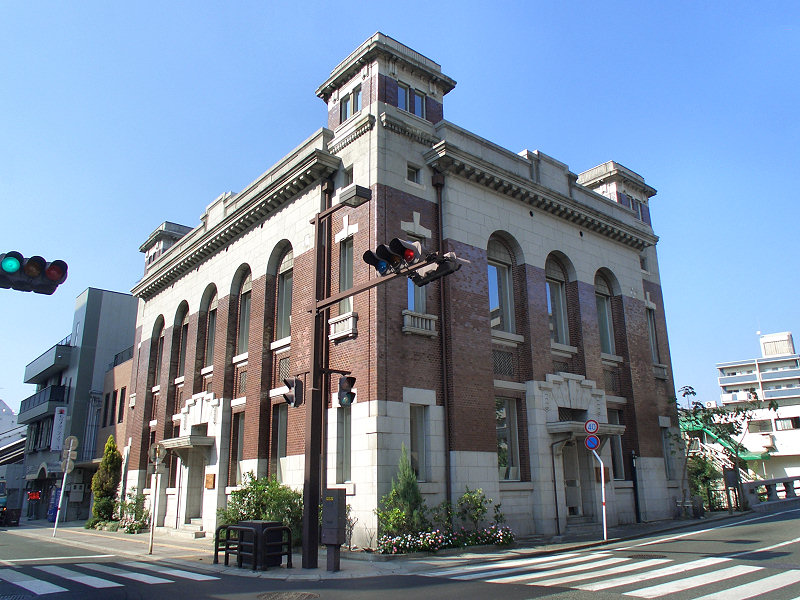
Former branch in Kumamoto, built in 1919

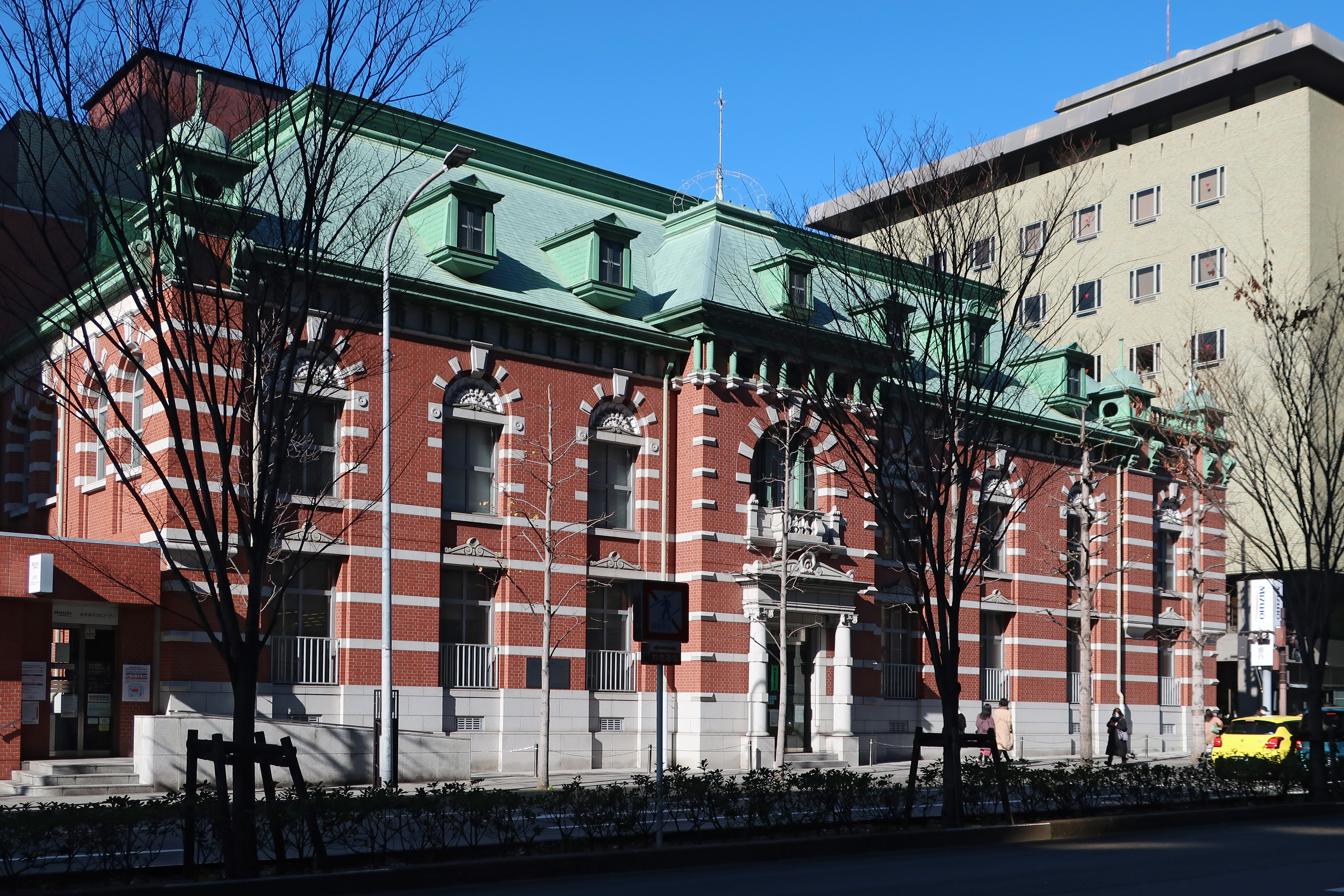
Branch in Kyoto, still in use by Mizuho Bank

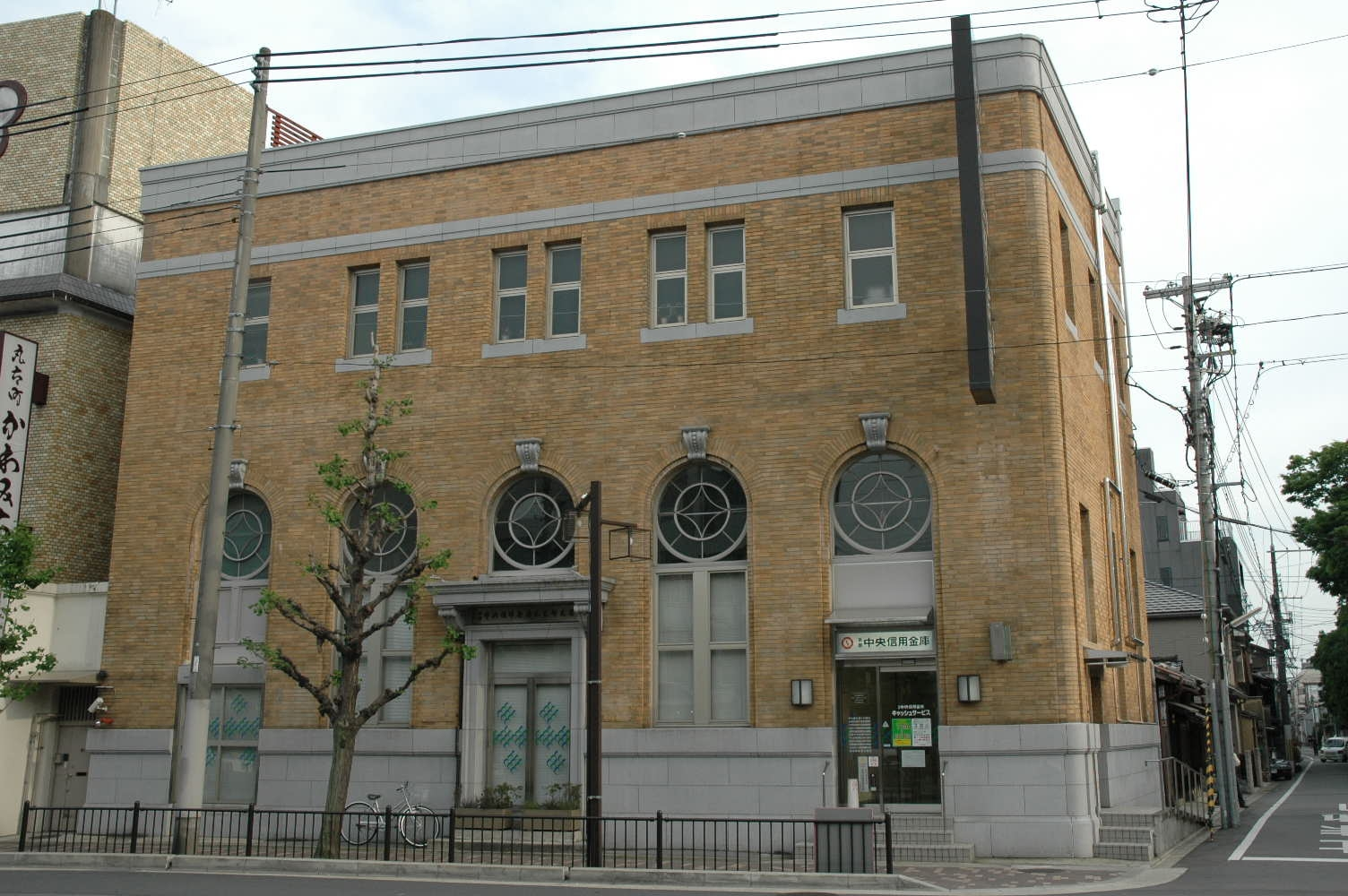
Former branch in Marutamachi, Kyoto, built 1927 and lately in use by the Kyoto Chuo Shinkin Bank

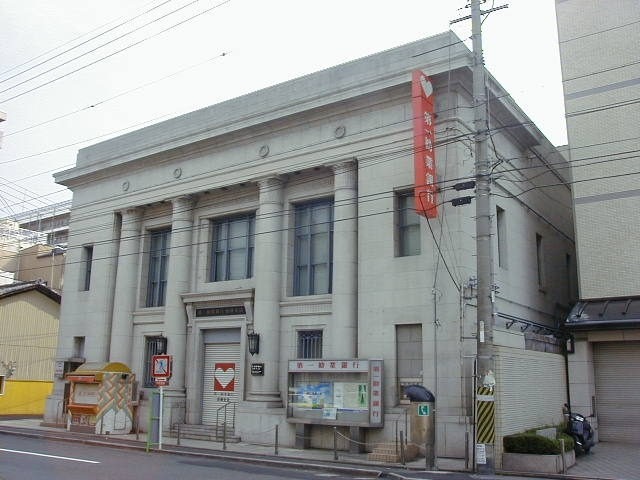
Branch in Nishijin, Kyoto, built 1936 and still in use by Mizuho Bank

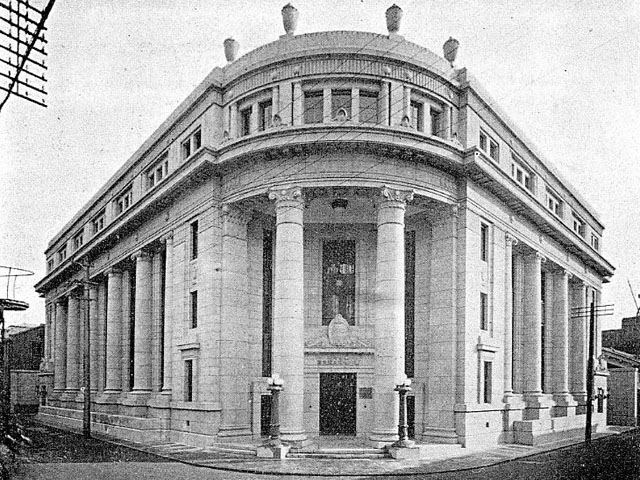
Branch building in Osaka, built in 1926, later demolished

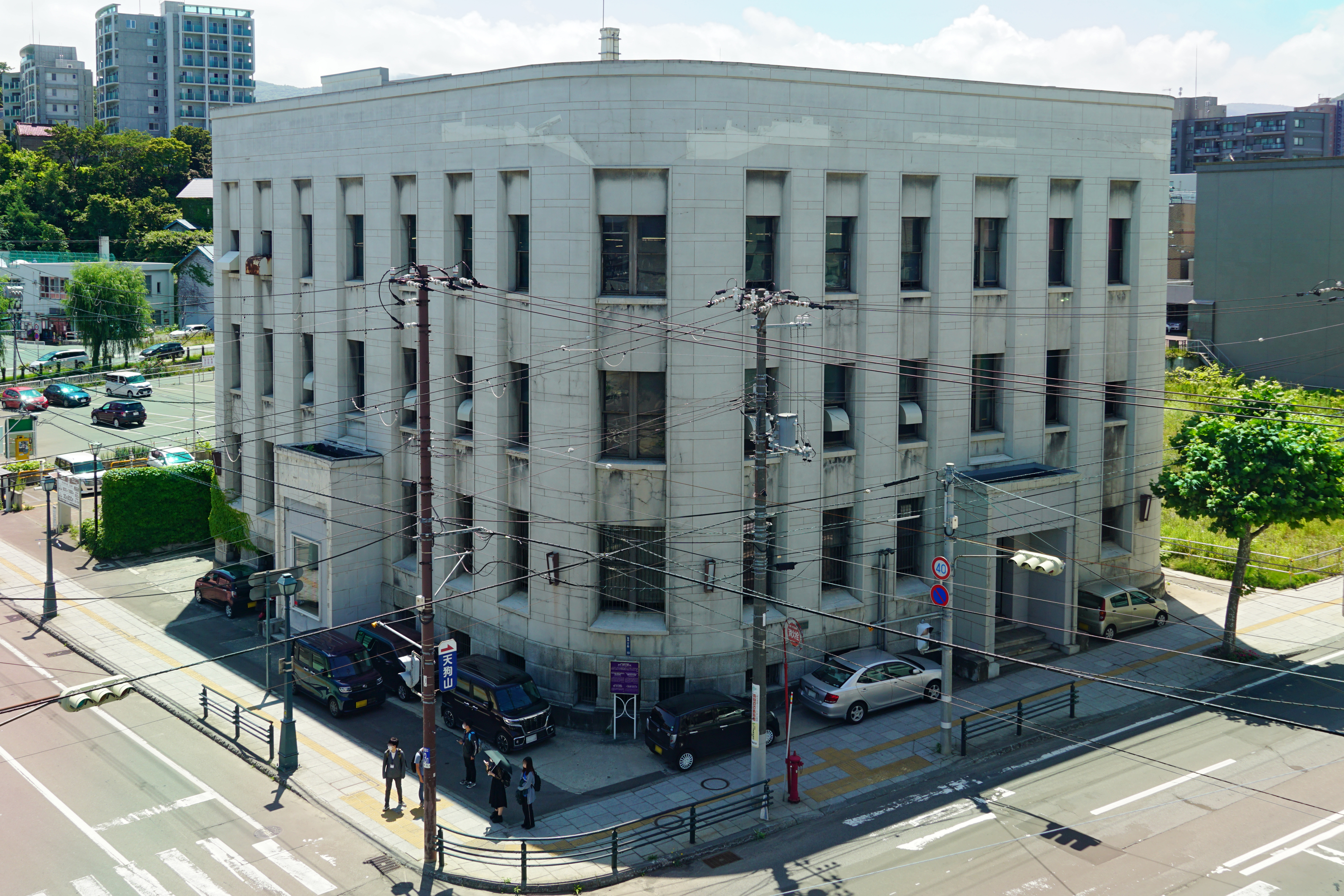
Former branch in Otaru, Hokkaido

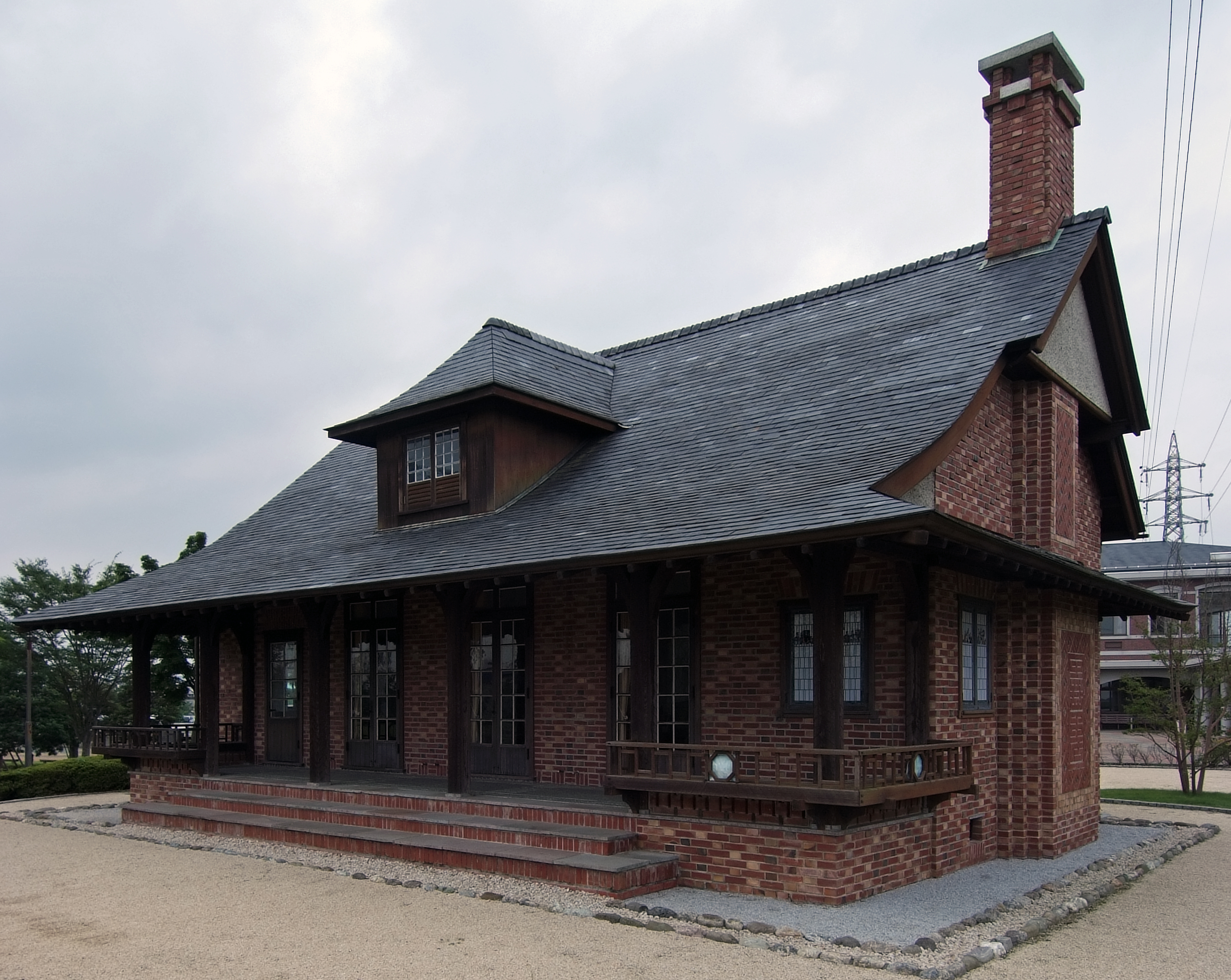
Former branch in Fukaya, Saitama, built in 1916

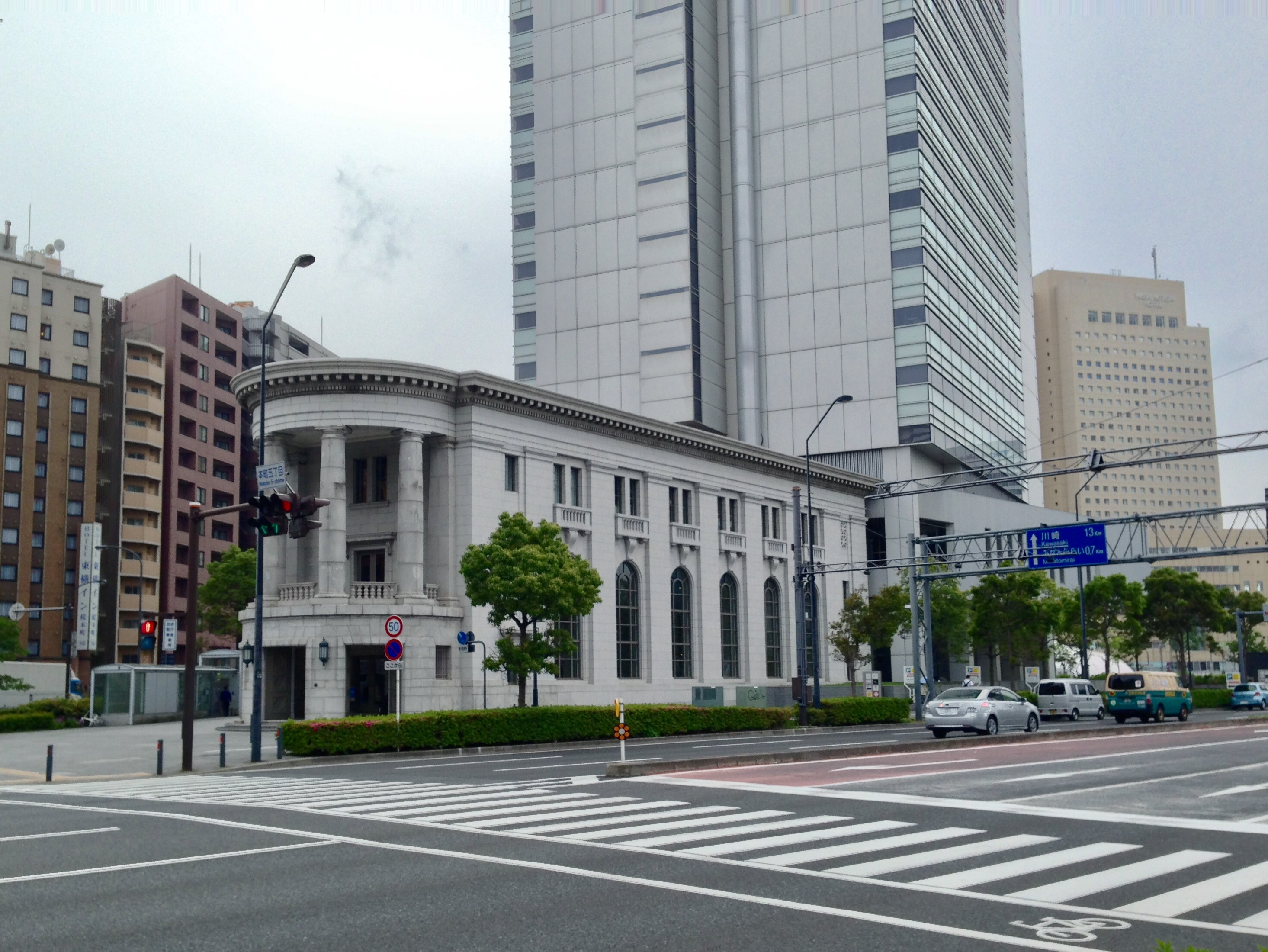
Former branch in Yokohama, built 1929, lately part of the Yokohama Island Tower complex

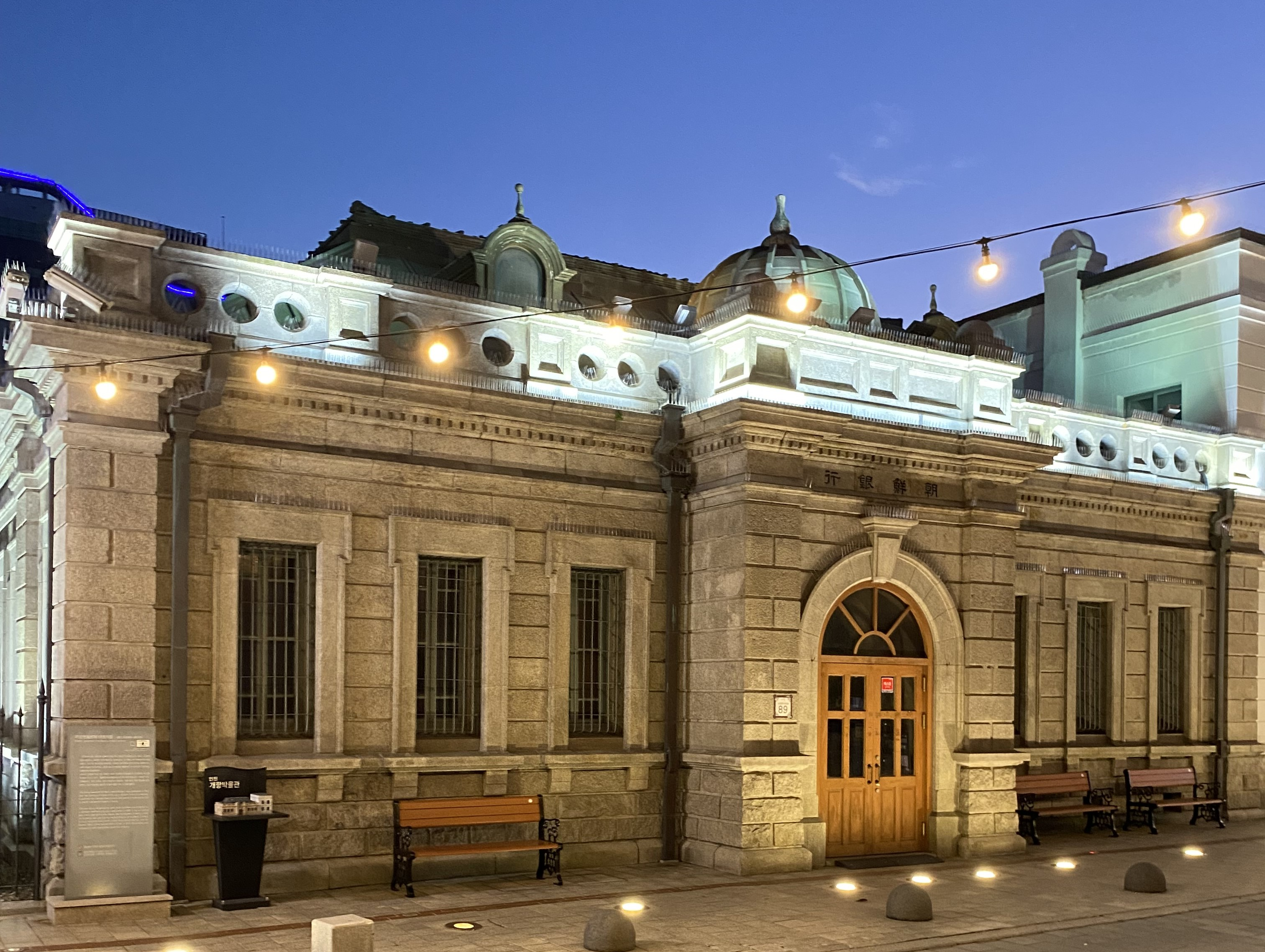
Former branch in Incheon, built in 1899, now Open Port Museum

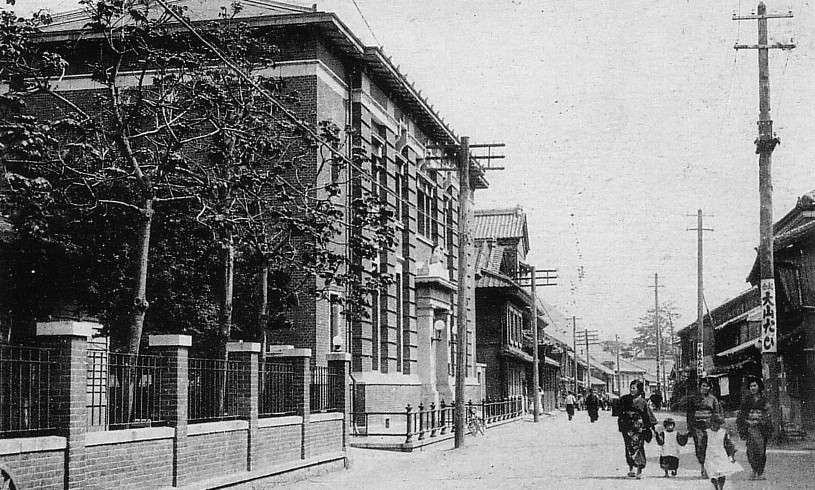
Former branch in Busan, kept by Dai-Ichi Bank after 1909 and until 1945, later demolished

== See also ==
- Fifteenth Bank
- Eighteenth Bank
- The 77 Bank
