= Shōwa financial crisis =

1927 Japanese economic crisis

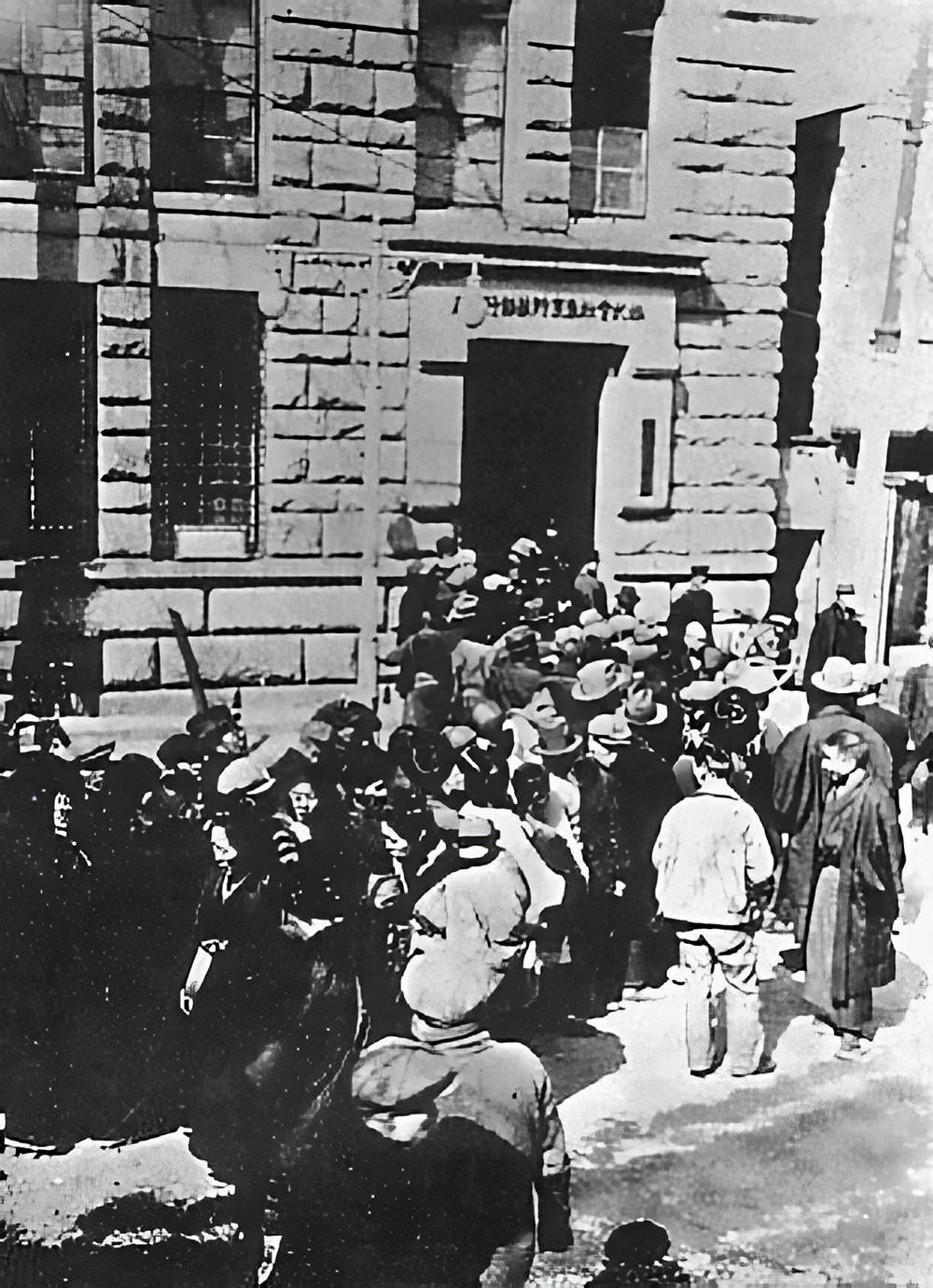
Bank run during the Shōwa Financial Crisis

The Shōwa Financial Crisis (昭和金融恐慌, Shōwa Kin'yū Kyōkō) was a financial panic in 1927, during the first year of the reign of Emperor Hirohito of Japan, and was a foretaste of the Great Depression. It brought down the government of Prime Minister Wakatsuki Reijirō and led to the domination of the zaibatsu over the Japanese banking industry.

The Shōwa Financial Crisis occurred after the post–World War I business boom in Japan. Many companies invested heavily in increased production capacity in what proved to be an economic bubble. The post-1920 economic slowdown and the Great Kantō earthquake of 1923 caused an economic depression, which led to the failures of many businesses. The government intervened through the Bank of Japan by issuing discounted "earthquake bonds" to overextended banks. In January 1927, when the government proposed to redeem the bonds, rumor spread that the banks holding these bonds would go bankrupt. In the ensuing bank run, 37 banks throughout Japan (including the Bank of Taiwan) and the second-tier zaibatsu Suzuki Shoten went under. Prime Minister Wakatsuki Reijirō attempted to have an emergency decree issued to allow the Bank of Japan to extend emergency loans to save these banks, but his request was denied by the Privy Council, and he was forced to resign.

Wakatsuki was succeeded by Prime Minister Tanaka Giichi, who managed to control the situation with a three-week bank holiday and the issuance of emergency loans; however, as a result of the collapse of many smaller banks, the large financial branches of the five great zaibatsu houses dominated Japanese finances until the end of World War II.

== See also ==
- Fifteenth Bank

== Sources ==
- Smitka, Michael (1998). The Interwar Economy of Japan : Colonialism, Depression, and Recovery, 1910-1940. Routledge. ISBN 0-8153-2706-4.
- Yamamura, Kozo (1998). The Economic Emergence of Modern Japan. Vol. 1. Cambridge University Press. ISBN 0-521-58946-0.
