= Fukuoka Financial Group =

Japanese financial company

Fukuoka Financial Group, Inc.

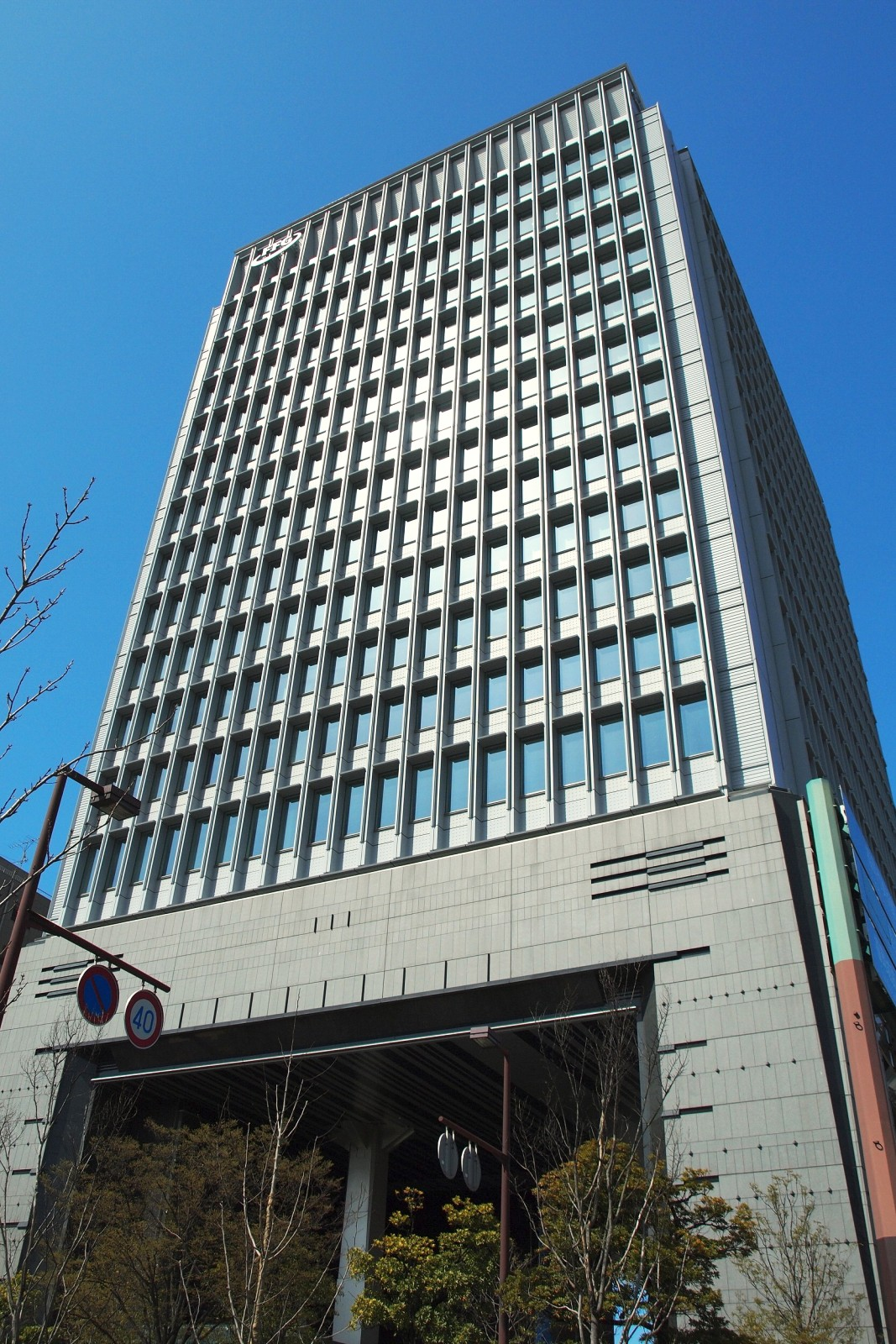
- Headquarters in Chūō-ku, Fukuoka
- Trade name: FFG
- Native name: 株式会社ふくおかフィナンシャルグループ
- Romanized name: Kabushiki-gaisha Fukuoka Finansharu Gurūpu
- Type: Public
- Traded as: TYO: 8354; FSE: 8354; Nikkei 225 component
- Industry: Banking
- Founded: April 2, 2007; 19 years ago
- Headquarters: Otemon, Chūō-ku, Fukuoka City, Fukuoka Prefecture, Japan
- Key people: Takashige Shibato (chairman); Hisashi Goto (president)
- Total assets: $128.9 billion (2015)
- Subsidiaries: The Bank of Fukuoka; The Kumamoto Bank; Eighteenth Shinwa Bank; The Fukuoka Chuo Bank; Minna Bank
- Website: fukuoka-fg.co.jp

Fukuoka Financial Group, Inc. (Note: 株式会社ふくおかフィナンシャルグループ, Kabushiki-gaisha Fukuoka Finansharu Gurūpu; FFG) is a Japanese multinational investment bank company that was formed in 2007 from the merger of the Fukuoka Bank and the Kumamoto Bank respectively. Based in Fukuoka, the company is listed on the Tokyo Stock Exchange and the Fukuoka Stock Exchange and is a constituent of the Nikkei 225 index.

Nagasaki-based Eighteenth Bank was acquired by FFG in April 2019, following an earlier merger attempt in 2017. In October 2020, Eighteenth Bank was merged with the Shinwa Bank, another FFG subsidiary, to form Eighteenth Shinwa Bank (or Juhachi Shinwa Bank), which operates as one of three FFG banking subsidiaries together with Fukuoka Bank and Kumamoto Bank.
