= First National Bank Building (Tokyo) =

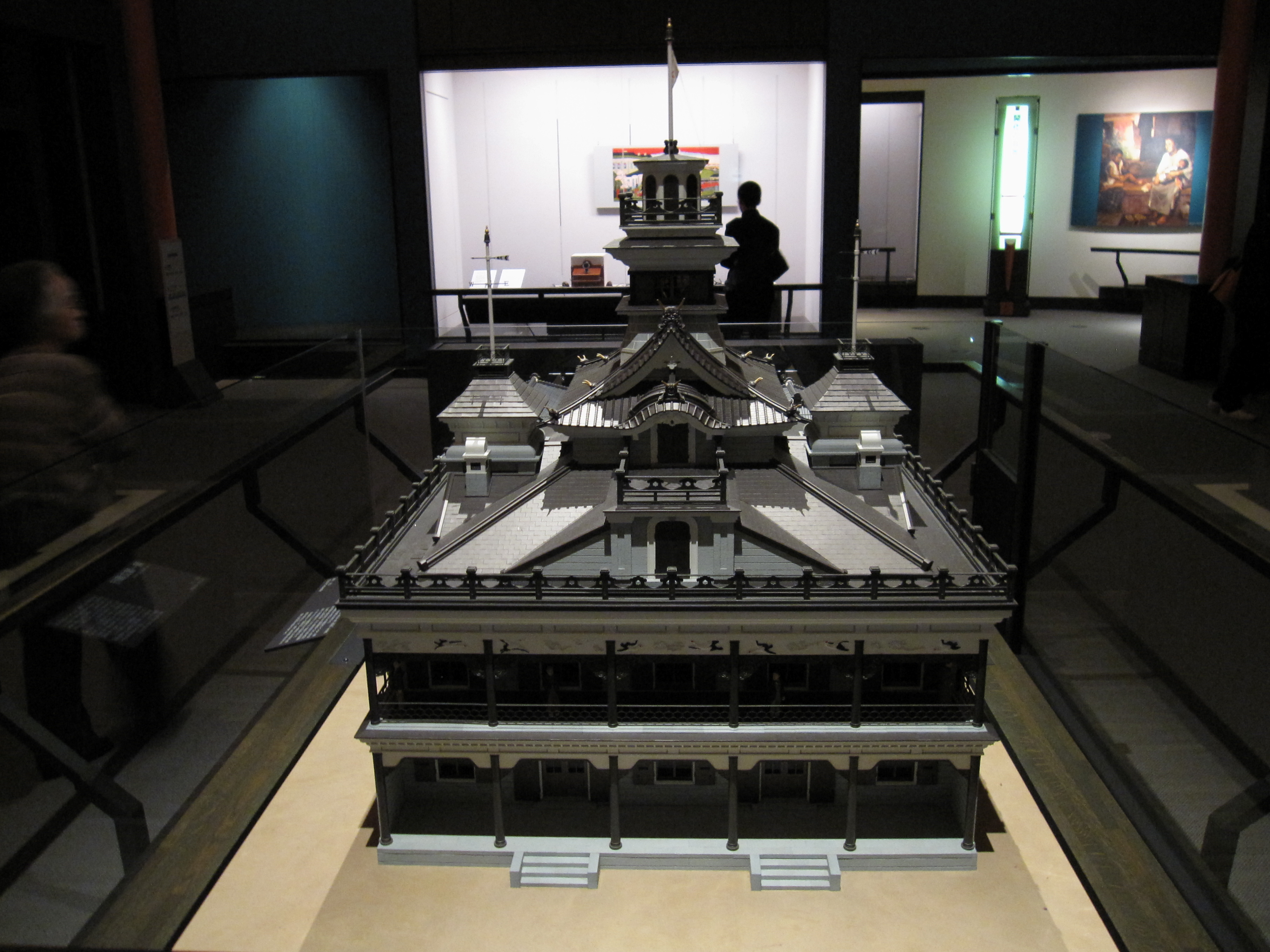
1/25 scale model of the First National Bank from the Meiji period in Tokyo

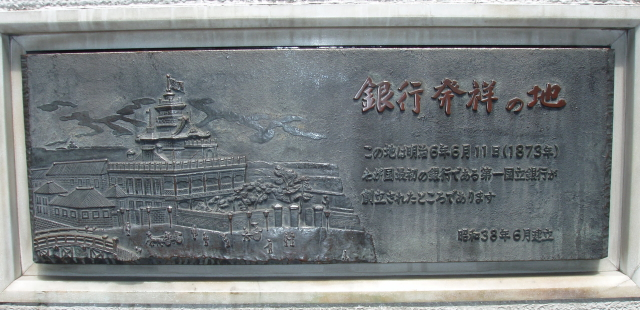
"Japanese Banking Birthplace" monument, inscribed with the head office of Dai-Ichi Kokuritsu Bank, in Nihonbashi, Tokyo

The First National Bank was located in the Kabutocho area, the business centre of Tokyo. Kabuto-cho was crowded with the core institutions of Japan's modern economy, including banks, the commodity exchange, and the stock exchange.

== History ==
The First National Bank building was initially constructed in 1872 as the main bank of the Mitsui group. In the following year, it became the headquarters of the Dai-Ichi Bank (lit. 'First National Bank'), which was founded by Shibusawa Eiichi (1840-1931) and other businessmen. The building featured a traditional Edo-style structure, but its exterior was in a pseudo-western style. Shimizu Kisuke II, who designed and constructed the building, had practiced western-style architecture in the foreign concession in Yokohama and was Japan's leading house builder. He also worked on structures such as the "Tsukiji Hotel" and the "Mitsui House" at Suruga-cho.

During the Meiji period, western architectural style and designs by foreign architects were adopted for many government facilities. Pseudo western-style buildings, mixing western and Japanese styles, were often constructed for the private sector.
