= The 77 Bank =

Japanese regional bank

The 77 Bank Ltd

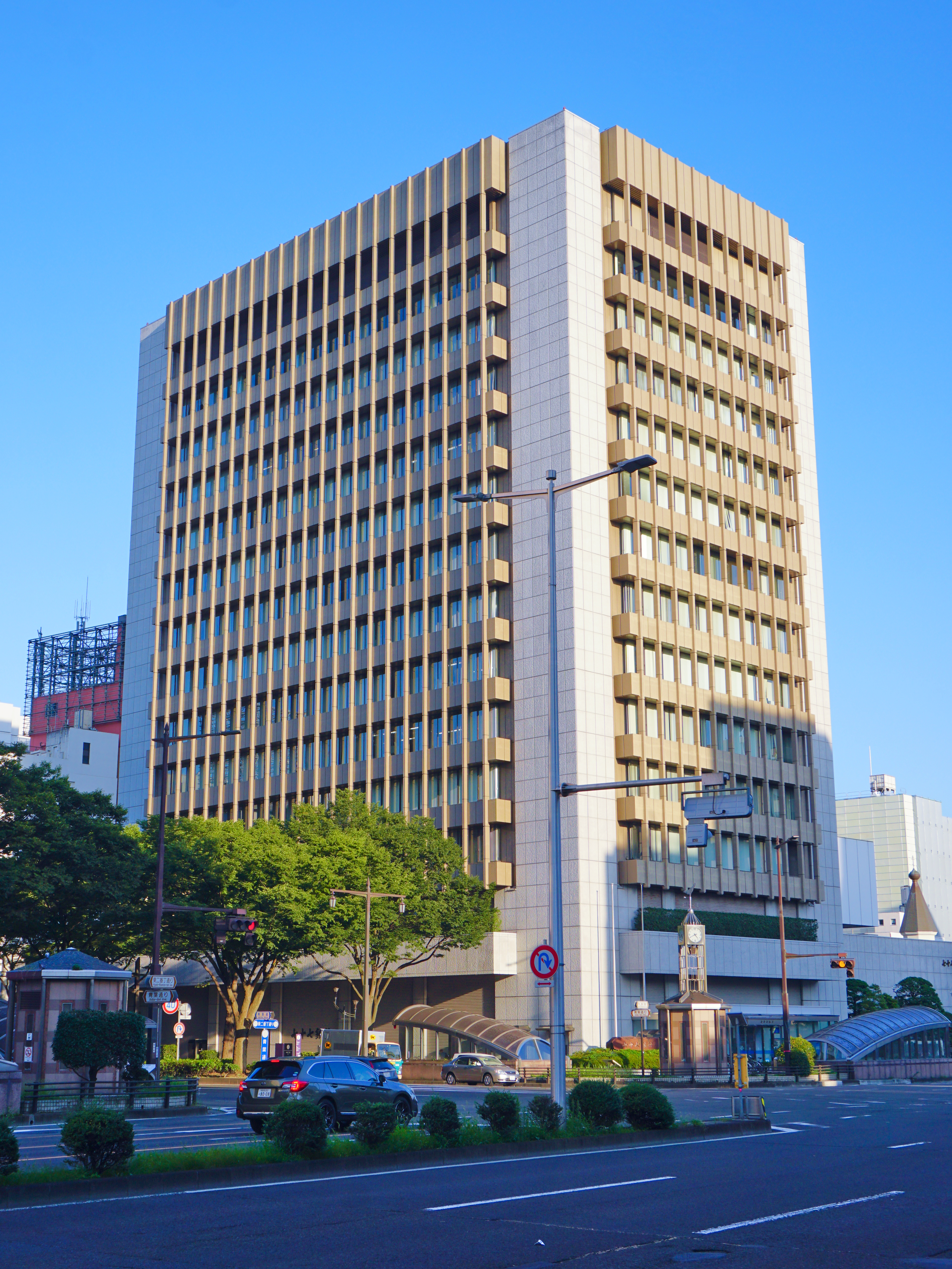
- head office of the 77 Bank
- Native name: 七十七銀行
- Type: Public (TYO: 8341)
- Industry: Banking; Financial services
- Founded: Sendai, Miyagi, Japan
- Headquarters: Sendai, Japan (December 1878)
- Number of locations: 110
- Area served: Tōhoku region, Japan
- Key people: Hiroshi Kamata (Chairman), Teruhiko Ujiie (President); Yoshiaki Nagayama (Deputy President)
- Products: Retail Banking; Payday advance Mortgages; Consumer Finance; Investment Banking
- Net income: 15.059 billion yen
- Total assets: 8.234 trillion yen
- Number of employees: 2,724
- Website: www.77bank.co.jp

The 77 Bank, Ltd. (株式会社七十七銀行, Kabushiki-gaisha Shichijūshichi Ginkō) (TYO: 8341) is a Japanese regional bank headquartered in Sendai, Miyagi Prefecture. As the designated financial institution of the prefecture, the city, and many other cities and towns throughout the prefecture, it performs duties such as holding deposits for public money and handling payments. It is also the biggest regional bank in the Tōhoku region.

The 77 Bank is unique among other Tōhoku region banks in operating branches in Nagoya and Osaka. It also runs a representative office in Shanghai. Following criticism for lagging behind in the establishment of a cooperative ATM network, the bank is scheduled to enter into an agreement with two other convenience store operators within the prefecture in March, 2006.

== Profile ==
As of March 31, 2014:

Assets: Approximately 8.234 trillion yen
Employees: 2,734
Branches: 141
President: Hiroshi Kamata (Chairman),
Teruhiko Ujiie (President)
Member: Regional Banks Association of Japan

== History ==
The 77 Bank traces its origins to an 1872 law allowing for the establishment of national banks in Japan. Having received approval from the Ministry of Finance in February, 1878, The 77th National Bank was established in September in Miyagi prefecture, an area with very limited banking services at the time. The famous industrialist of the time and president of the First National Bank, Shibusawa Eiichi, took an interest in the development of the Tohoku region; he supported the fledgling bank through advice, provision of some of his own funds, and the supply of personnel from The First National Bank when The 77th National Bank was founded.

The 77th National Bank changed its name to The 77 Bank, Ltd. in 1932, when it merged with the Tohoku Jitsugyo Bank and the Gojo Bank.

Although The 77 Bank closed representative offices and branches in London and New York City after the collapse of the bubble economy in the 1990s, it opened a representative office in Shanghai in July, 2005.
