= Dai-Ichi Kangyo Bank Head Office Building =

Mizuho Bank Uchisaiwaichō Head Office Building
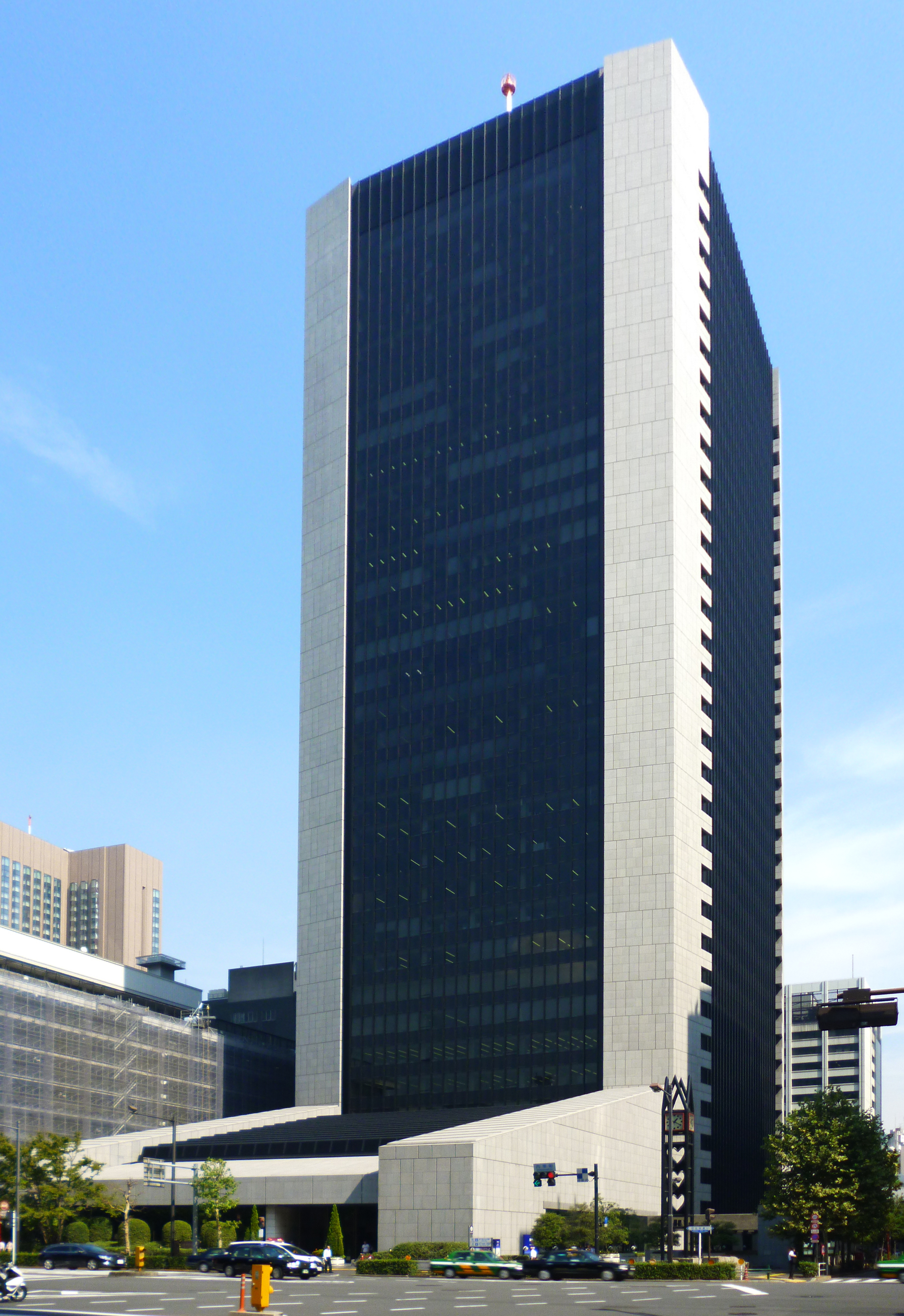
- Interactive map of the Mizuho Bank Uchisaiwaichō Head Office Building area

General information
- Type: Office
- Location: Chiyoda, Tokyo, Japan
- Coordinates: 35°40′14″N 139°45′26″E
- Construction started: 1977
- Completed: 1980
- Demolished: 2022

Height
- Antenna spire: 142.5 metres (468 ft)
- Roof: 132.0 metres (433 ft)
- Top floor: 32

Technical details
- Floor count: 36 (32 above ground, 4 underground)
- Floor area: 135,014 m^{2} (1,453,280 sq ft)

Design and construction
- Architect: Yoshinobu Ashihara
- Main contractor: Shimizu Corporation; Kajima Construction; Ando Corporation; Sato Kogyo Co., Ltd. Nissan Construction

The Mizuho Bank Uchisaiwaichō Head Office Building (みずほ銀行内幸町本部ビル, Mizuho Ginkō Uchisaiwaichō Honbu Biru) was a 143 m (469 ft) tall office skyscraper in Tokyo, Japan. At 38 stories the building was the 86th tallest building in Tokyo. It contained 1.4 million sq ft (134,974 m²) of office space, 100% of which was now occupied by Mizuho Bank, the consumer banking arm of the second-largest Japanese financial conglomerate Mizuho Financial Group, while still called the DKB Head Office from time to time.

The building was built in Chiyoda at 1 Uchisaiwaichō in 1981, when it was called the Dai-Ichi Kangyo Bank Head Office Building. It was designed by architects Yoshinobu Ashihara & Partners and developed by Shimizu Corporation, one of the “big five” real estate developers in Japan. Dai-Ichi Kangyo Bank (“DKB”) combined with Fuji Bank and the Industrial Bank of Japan in 2000 to form Mizuho Financial Group.

The building was closed prior to its demolition in 2022.
