= Fuyo Group =

Japanese keiretsu

Fuyo Group (芙蓉グループ, Fuyō Gurūpu) is a Japanese keiretsu descended from the Yasuda zaibatsu, Asano zaibatsu and Okura zaibatsu. They were a major business grouping in Japan up to World War II. In 1948, Yasuda was dismantled, with its key financial arm Yasuda Bank becoming Fuji Bank.

The modern Fuyo Group was first developed in the early 1960s around Marubeni and Fuji Bank, paralleling the development of the DKB Group and Sanwa Group. Fuji Bank orchestrated the merger of Marubeni with Takashimaya in 1955 in order to create a strong trading company partner for Fuji's customers. Group presidents began meeting regularly in 1964. Unlike the keiretsu that developed from the Mitsubishi, Mitsui and Sumitomo zaibatsu remnants, the Fuyo Group was intended to be open to other businesses as well as legacy zaibatsu businesses.

Fuji Bank merged with Dai-Ichi Kangyo Bank and Industrial Bank of Japan in 2000 to form Mizuho Financial Group. Following the merger, the Fuyo Group became centered on Marubeni, Meiji Yasuda Life Insurance and Yasuda Fire & Marine Insurance (now Sompo Japan).

Fuyo is Japanese for "hibiscus" and is also used as an alternative name for Mount Fuji, the tallest mountain in Japan and the namesake for Fuji Bank.

== Companies ==
- Canon
- Hitachi
- JFE Holdings
- Kayaba Industry
- Keikyu
- Maeda Corporation
- Marubeni
- Matsuya
- Meiji Yasuda Life Insurance
- Mizuho Bank
- Mizuho Trust Bank
- Nichirei
- Nippon Suisan Kaisha
- Nissan
- Nisshinbo Industries
- Nisshin Seifun Group
- NSK Ltd.
- Oki Electric Industry
- Palace Hotel, Tokyo
- Penta-Ocean
- Ricoh
- Sapporo Brewery
- Showa Denko
- Sompo Japan Insurance
- Taiheiyo Cement
- Taisei Corporation
- TOA Construction Corporation
- Tobu Railway
- Yamaha
