= Mizuho Trust & Banking =

Bank of Japan

Mizuho Trust & Banking Co., Ltd.

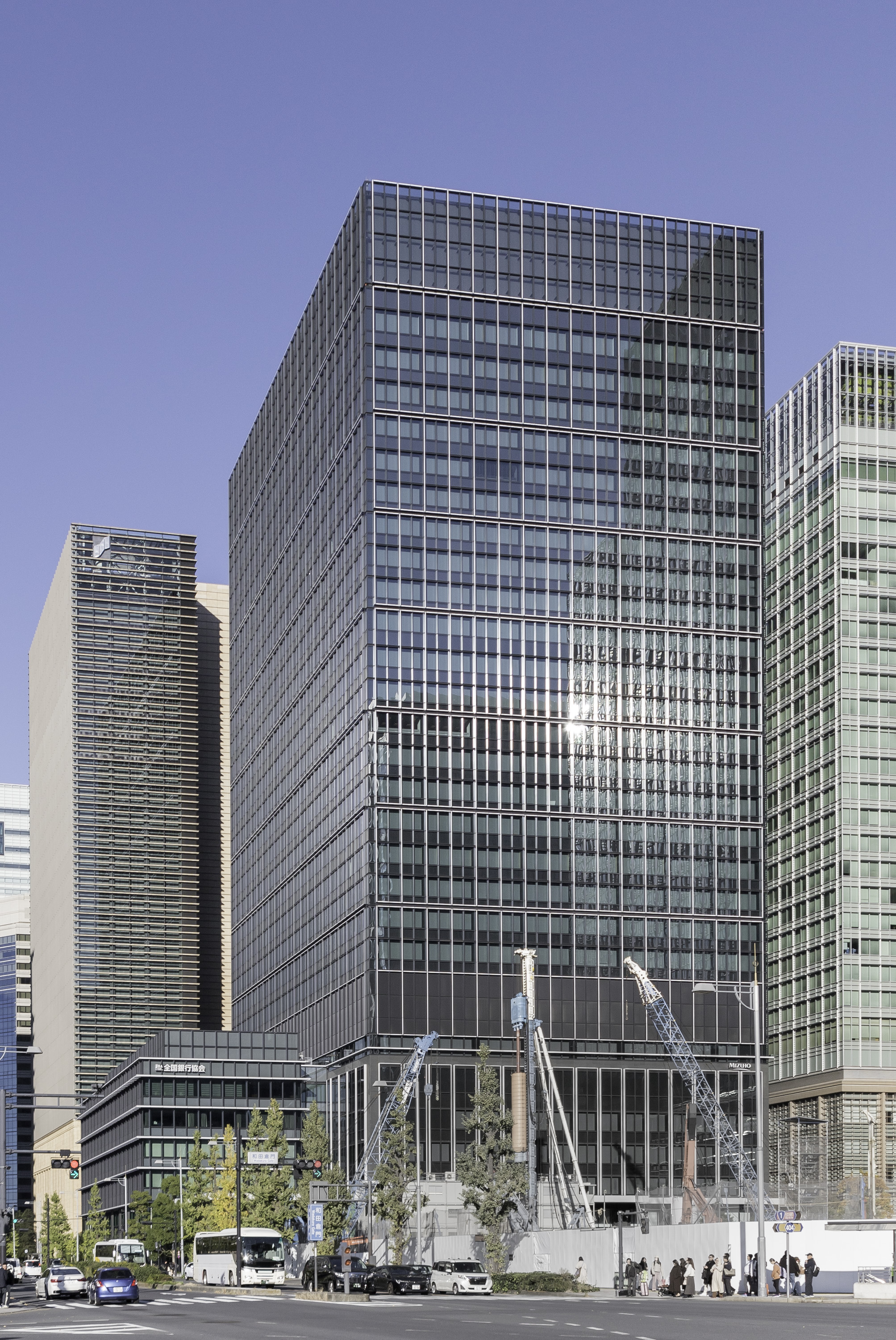
- Mizuho Trust & Banking head office in Tokyo
- Company type: Public
- Traded as: TYO: 8404
- Industry: Private Banking
- Founded: 1925; 101 years ago
- Headquarters: Tokyo, Japan
- Key people: Tetsuo Iimori (president & CEO)
- Revenue: 164.9 billion JPY (FY 2005)
- Owner: Mizuho Financial Group
- Number of employees: 3,266 (2017)
- Website: www.mizuho-tb.co.jp/english/

Mizuho Trust & Banking Co., Ltd. (みずほ信託銀行株式会社, Mizuho Shintaku Ginkō Kabushiki-gaisha) is the trust banking arm of Mizuho Financial Group.

== History ==
The merger of the Dai-Ichi Kangyo Bank, Fuji Bank and the Industrial Bank of Japan in 2000 was followed by the merger of their respective trust banking subsidiaries, creating Mizuho Trust & Banking Co. The company is known for developing trust products for specific types of families, including those in the LGBT community. Its main activities include asset management for individuals, securitization, private banking, and custody. Mizuho Trust & Banking also has administration services for a variety of trust, including money trusts, pecuniary trusts, investment trusts, and securities trusts. Its pension activities include corporate pension design planning, the management of pension policy holders, and pension scheme review. Additionally, they design compensation plans for senior executives and other employee retirement benefits. The company is a 100% wholly owned subsidiary of the Mizuho Financial Group.

== See also ==
- Yasuda Trust & Banking
- Mizuho Bank
