= Otemachi Tower =

Skyscraper in Japan

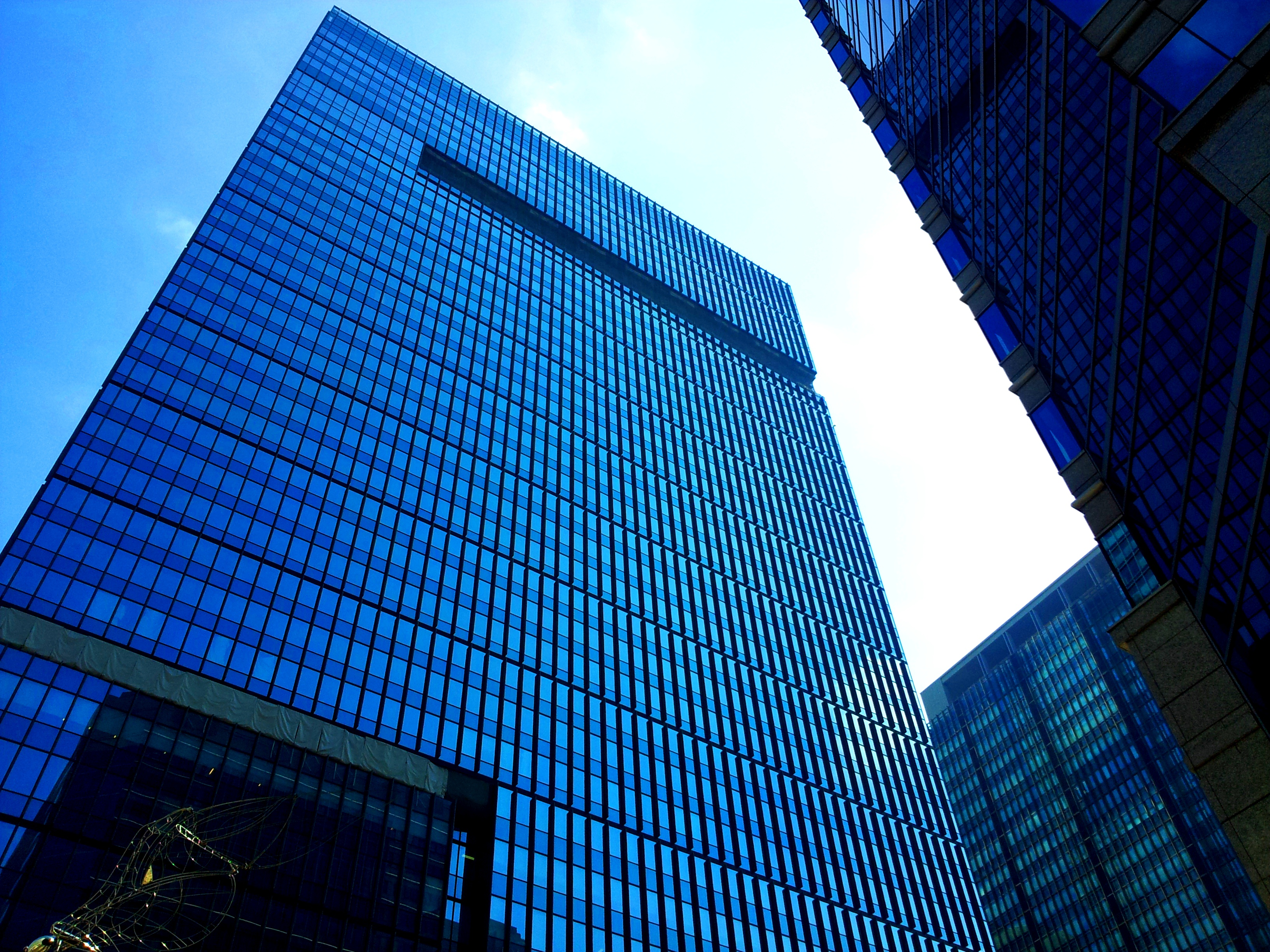
- Interactive map of the Otemachi Tower area

General information
- Status: Completed
- Type: Mizuho Bank Headquarters, hotel
- Location: Chiyoda, Tokyo, Japan
- Coordinates: 35.685606°N 139.765275°E
- Construction started: November 2009
- Completed: April 2014
- Opening: December 2014

Height
- Roof: 199.7 m (655 ft)
- Top floor: 38

Technical details
- Floor count: 44 (38 above ground, 6 underground)
- Floor area: 198,390 m^{2} (2,135,500 sq ft)

Design and construction
- Architect: Kohn Pedersen Fox
- Main contractor: Taisei Corporation

The Otemachi Tower (大手町タワー) is a high-rise office building with integrated retail and restaurant facilities (which are also known as OTEMORI) located in the Otemachi business district in Chiyoda ward, Tokyo.

The 38-story tower serves as the headquarters of Mizuho Bank. A luxury hotel facility operated by Aman Resorts occupies the top six floors of the tower.

== Overview ==
The Otemachi Tower replaced the previous 16-story head office complex of Fuji Bank then of Muzuho Holdings, which had been built in 1990 on the same site and was demolished in 2012.

A major feature is a 3,600-m^{2} green area named "Otemachi Forest" occupying one third of the site.

The building is situated above a nexus of five subway lines. The basement floors connect directly to Ōtemachi Station, as well as other nearby buildings.
