= Yasuda Trust & Banking =

Former Japanese financial institution

- Formerly: Chuo Trust & Banking
- Company type: Private company
- Industry: Financial services
- Founded: 1925; 100 years ago
- Founder: Yasuda zaibatsu
- Defunct: 1999
- Fate: Bankrupt
- Headquarters: Tokyo, Japan
- Area served: Japan
- Products: Trust management and industrial financing

Yasuda Trust & Banking (YT&B) was a Japanese financial institution, based in Tokyo. It was founded in 1925 within the Yasuda zaibatsu, and as such worked in concert with Yasuda Bank. Following World War II, simultaneously as Yasuda Bank was renamed Fuji Bank, and Yasuda Trust became Chuo Trust & Banking, but reverted to the Yasuda name in 1952. In 1999, it went bankrupt in one of the more disorderly episodes of the Japanese financial crisis.

== History ==
Yasuda Trust & Banking was one of Japan's so-called trust banks, which engaged in trust management and industrial financing. It was established the passage of new Japanese trust banking legislation in 1923. It was initially named Kyosai (”mutual aid”) Trust Company, and in 1926 renamed as Yasuda Trust as Yasuda had expanded its interest in the venture.

During the American occupation of Japan, the zaibatsu conglomerates were forcibly broken up, and Yasuda Trust was reincorporated as Chuo Trust & Banking, from the name of the central district of Tokyo where is head office was located. It called itself again as Yasuda following the enactment of a new Loan Trust Law in 1952. This law enabled Yasuda to serve the market for long-term beneficiary certificates of variable denominations. In this way, customers, mostly private individuals, provided the bank with additional capital for long-term industrial financing. Yasuda Trust & Banking's corporate clients included Hitachi, Nippon Steel, Nissan and Marubeni. In that period, Yasuda had a high reputation for prudent risk management.

Yasuda Trust & Banking initiated an overseas expansion by opening intelligence-gathering offices in various foreign markets during the 1960s, often manages jointly with other affiliates of the Fuyo Group. It subsequently opened branches or agencies in Hong Kong, London, Los Angeles, New York, and Singapore, as well as Luxembourg and Switzerland. Also in 1988, it opened a representative office in Atlanta.

One of YT&B's business lines was pension management, with over ¥2.2 trillion in pension fund assets as of 1988. At that time, its total assets reached ¥10.62 trillion (US$84.97 billion).

During the 1990s, Yasuda Trust & Banking expanded to become the 23rd-largest banking organization in Japan with ca. US$61 billion total assets, but had to cope with mounting bad loans. On 28 January 1999, its financial condition became unsustainable and it was announced that it would be absorbed into Fuji Bank. Fuji was still experiencing its own difficulties, however, and eventually negotiated an agreement with Dai-Ichi Kangyo Bank under which they merged their respective trust operations, including Yasuda. The combined business was subsequently integrated into Mizuho Trust & Banking.

== See also ==
- Yasuda zaibatsu
