= Mizuho Corporate Bank =

Japanese banking subsidiary

Mizuho Corporate Bank, Ltd.
- Type: Public
- Industry: Financial services
- Founded: 1893; 133 years ago
- Defunct: 2013; 13 years ago
- Fate: Merged with Mizuho Bank
- Successor: Mizuho Bank
- Headquarters: Tokyo, Japan
- Key people: Koji Fujiwara (president & CEO)
- Revenue: ▲$14.082 billion USD (FY 2005)
- Number of employees: 7,349 (2005)
- Parent: Mizuho Financial Group
- Subsidiaries: Mizuho Securities Co., Ltd.
- Website: www.mizuhocbk.com

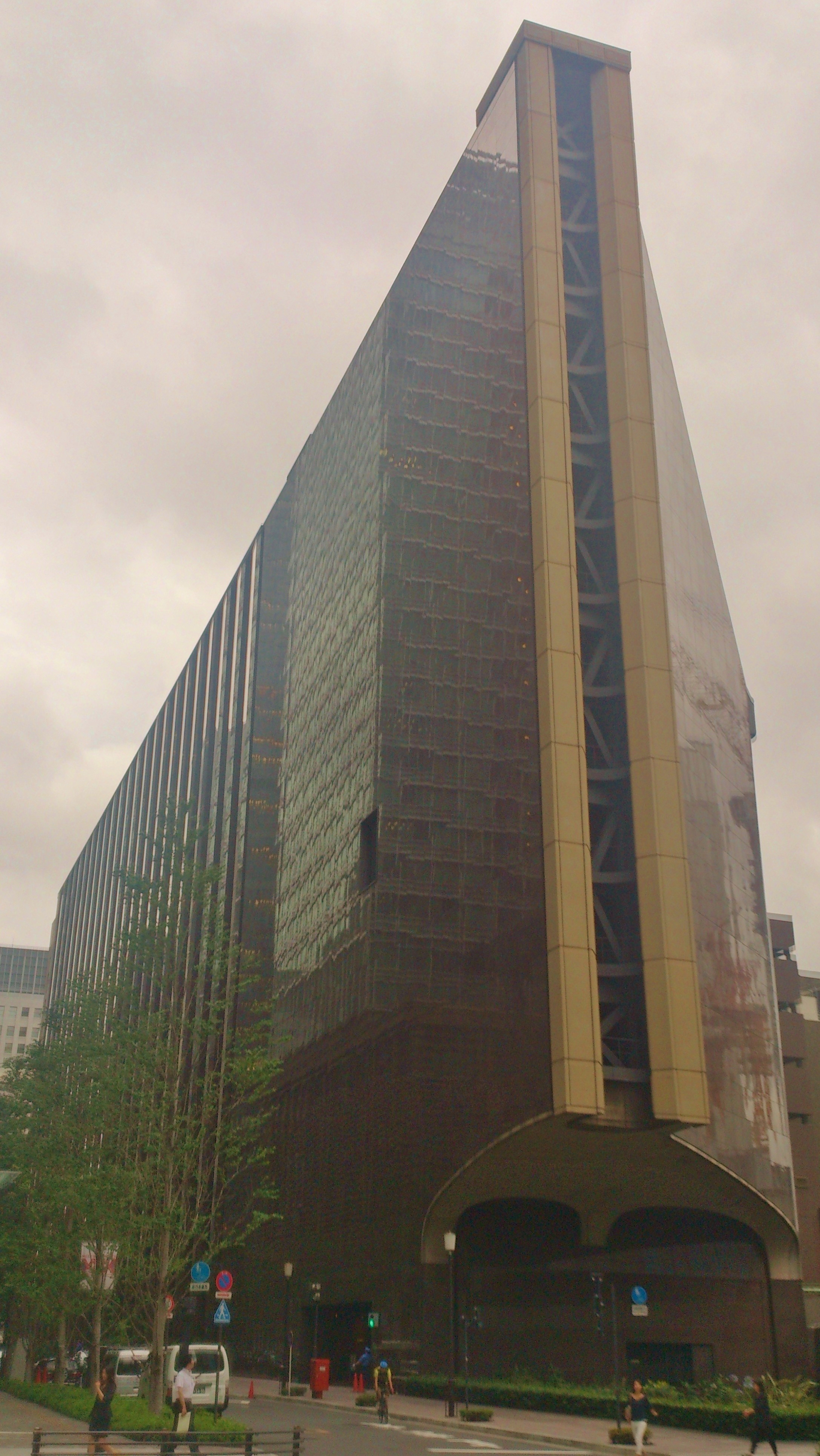
Mizuho Corporate Bank Head Office in Marunouchi, Tokyo

Mizuho Corporate Bank, Ltd. (株式会社みずほコーポレート銀行, Kabushiki-gaisha Mizuho Kōporēto Ginkō), or MHCB, was the corporate and investment banking subsidiary of Mizuho Financial Group, the second-biggest Japanese financial services conglomerate, prior to the reintegration of investment banking services under the Mizuho Bank name in July 2013.

== History ==
MHCB was created in April 2002 by the merger of the Dai-Ichi Kangyo Bank and Fuji Bank's corporate and investment banking division with the Industrial Bank of Japan. Backed by Mizuho Financial Group's credit ratings and financial solidity, MHCB was positioned as a major player in financial markets and among Japan's leading corporate and investment banks by market share. The brokerage arm Mizuho Securities was also a primary dealer in the U.S. Treasury securities market. MHCB opened a branch in Wuxi, China in 2006 in a bid to support transactions with Japanese companies operating in the city. The bank also had a branch in the Philippines, partnering with the Bank of the Philippine Islands. In 2013, it merged with the former Mizuho Bank, with the unified institution being "Mizuho Bank".

== Shareholders ==
- Mizuho Financial Group (100%)

== See also ==
- Mizuho Financial Group
- Mizuho Bank
- Industrial Bank of Japan
