= Sanwa Group =

Japanese keiretsu, based in Osaka

The Sanwa Group (三和グループ, Sanwa gurūpu) was a leading Japanese keiretsu, based in Osaka, between World War II and the Japanese asset price bubble in the early 1990s. It remains in existence as a jointly held company called Midori-kai (みどり会).

Sanwa Bank was a major financier for the textile industry in the 1950s. After arranging an affiliation between Ube Industries and Nippon Rayon in 1954, Sanwa began promoting industrial transactions between its major customers, formalizing the process in the early 1960s through the establishment of special promotion units. In 1968, Sanwa arranged the merger of the Nissho and Iwai trading companies to form Nissho Iwai (now Sojitz), creating a large general trading company to cater to its customers. The three largest members of the group (Hitachi Shipbuilding, Ube Industries and Teijin) had relatively independent positions with no cross-shareholdings. The development of this group paralleled the development of the Fuyo Group and DKB Group around alliances between major banks and trading companies.

The Sanwa Group held a collective exhibition at Expo '70 in Osaka called Midori-kan (みどり館). Later that year, 31 Sanwa Group members formed Midori-kai as a joint venture company. It eventually grew to 157 members, serving as a common HR, insurance and business support platform.

After the stock market and real estate crash in the 1990s, the group's core bank, Sanwa Bank (三和銀行) was laden with bad debts. In 2001, it merged with Tokai Bank and Toyo Trust and Banking Company to form UFJ Holdings (UFJホールディングス), with the UFJ Group (UFJグループ) taking over from Sanwa Group. Later, UFJ Holdings merged with Bank of Tokyo-Mitsubishi to form Mitsubishi UFJ Financial Group.
