= Asset Management One =

Japanese investment management firm

Asset Management One Co., Ltd.

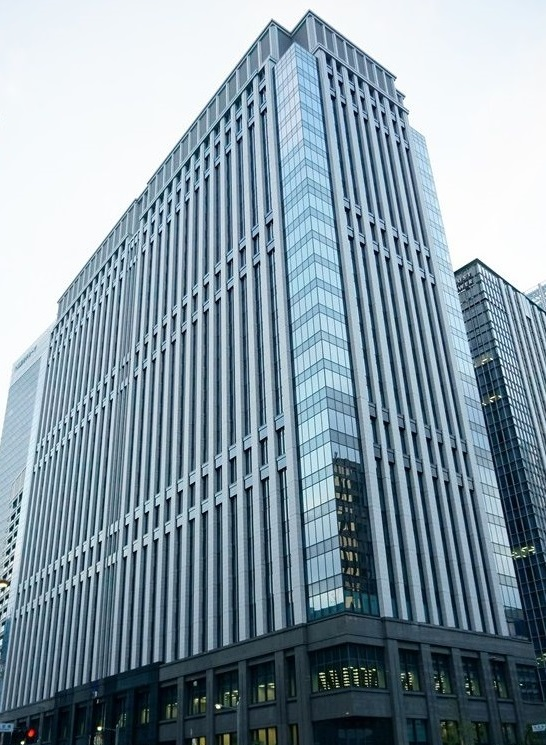
- Headquarters at Tekko Building, Chiyoda-ku, Tokyo
- Native name: アセットマネジメントOne株式会社
- Company type: Subsidiary
- Industry: Investment management
- Founded: October 2016; 8 years ago
- Headquarters: Tekko Building, 1-8-2 Marunouchi, Chiyoda-ku, Tokyo 100-0005, Japan
- Key people: Noriyuki Sugihara (CEO)
- Products: Mutual funds ETFs; Quantitative funds Pension Fund; UCITS; Alternative investments
- AUM: US$467 billion (December 2024)
- Owner: Mizuho Financial Group (51%); Dai-ichi Life (49%)
- Number of employees: 891 (2024)
- Website: am-one.co.jp

Asset Management One Co., Ltd. (アセットマネジメントOne株式会社), abbreviated as AM-One, is a Japanese asset management company. It is a subsidiary of the Mizuho Financial Group and is one of the largest asset management companies in Asia. AM-One acts as one of the investment managers for the Government Pension Investment Fund and is the largest manager of Japanese public pension assets.

== History ==
AM-One was formed on 1 October 2016, as a joint venture between Mizuho Financial Group and Dai-ichi Life using the pre-existing asset management units within each company. There were four companies which were merged to create AM-One. They were DIAM Co, Mizuho Asset Management, Shinko Asset Management, and Asset Management Division of Mizuho Trust & Banking.

Currently, Mizuho Financial Group holds 70% of the company's shares and 51% of voting rights while Dai-ichi Life holds 30% of the company's shares and 49% of voting rights.

While initially focused on Japan, the company has expanded its presence to Asia, Europe and America.

== Business overview ==
AM-One's investment product range includes:

- Equities (Both active and passive investment strategies)
- Fixed Income (Both active and passive investment strategies)
- Quantitative
- Alternatives (Including REIT, Commodities and Private equity)

Its European product range also includes UCITS funds.

AM-One operates various Exchange-traded funds which are listed on the Tokyo Stock Exchange such as " One ETF Nikkei 225" and "One ETF TOPIX" .

AM-One is headquartered in Tokyo with additional offices in London, New York, Singapore and Hong Kong.
