= Sanwa Bank =

Former Japanese bank

Sanwa Bank logo

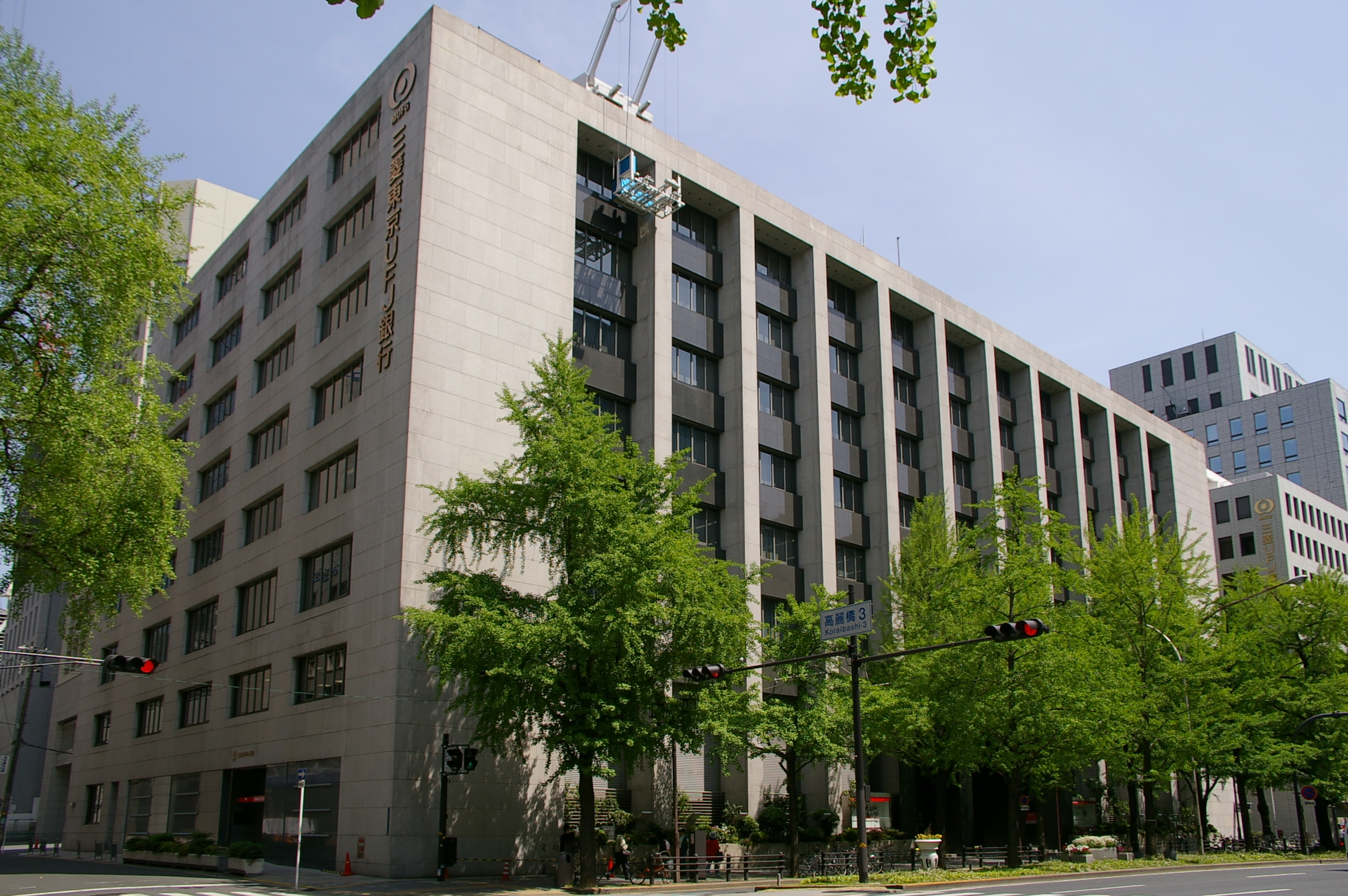
Former head office in Osaka

The Sanwa Bank (株式会社三和銀行, Kabushiki gaisha Sanwa Ginkō) was a major Japanese bank headquartered in Osaka, which operated from 1933 to 2002. It resulted from the merger of three local banks, Konoike Bank (est. 1877 as 13th National Bank), 34th Bank (est. 1878), and Yamaguchi Bank (est. 1879 as 148th National Bank).

In 2002, Sanwa Bank merged with Tokai Bank and Toyo Trust and Banking to form UFJ Bank, itself a predecessor entity of Mitsubishi UFJ Financial Group.

== Overview ==
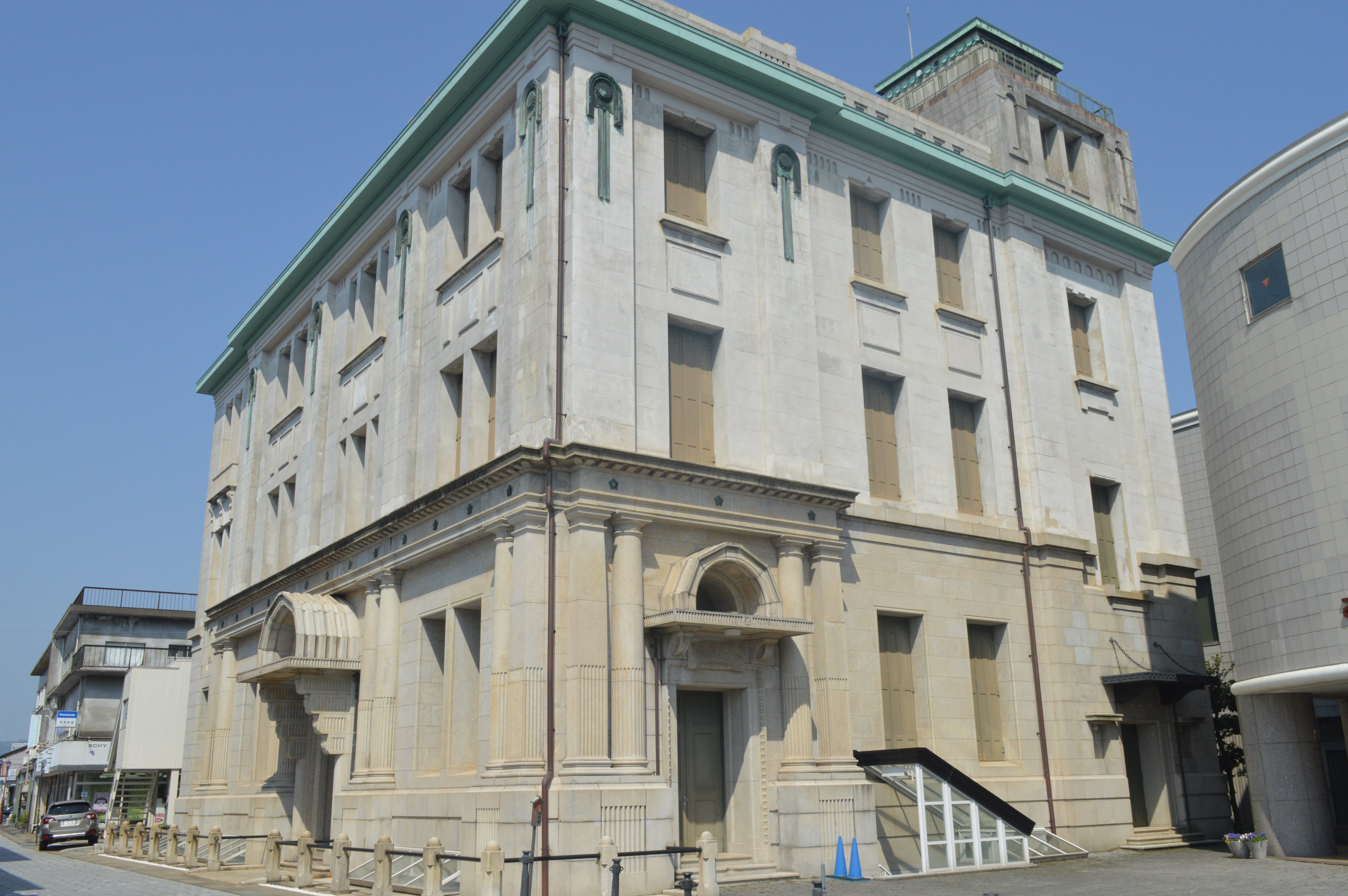
Former branch building in Tsuruga, lately Tsuruga City Museum

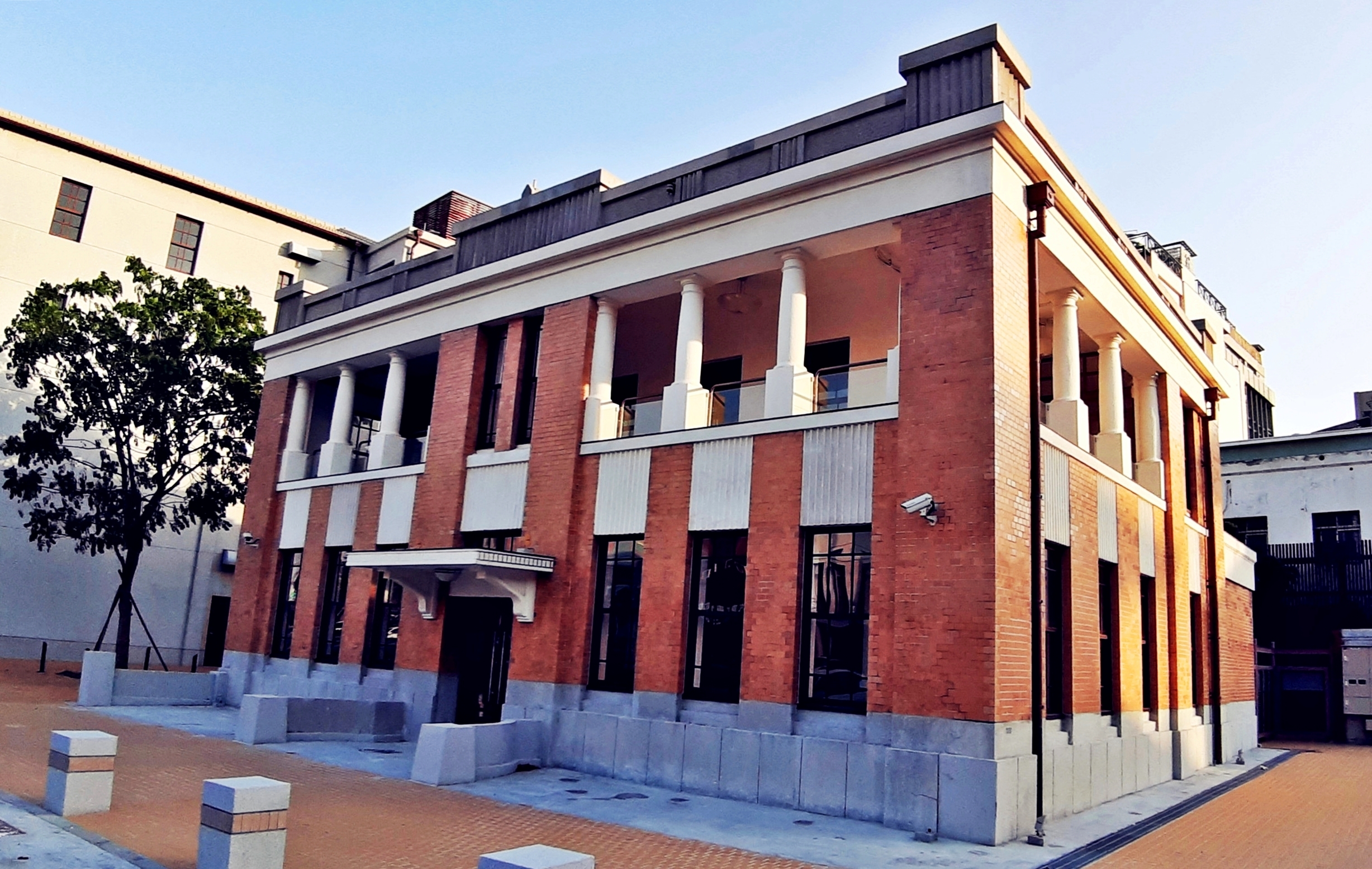
Former 34th Bank branch building in Kaohsiung, Taiwan, known locally as the former Sanhe Bank

Sanwa was formed by the 1933 merger of three Osaka-based banks. The oldest of these banks, Kōnoike Bank, dated its operations back to 1656, when the Kōnoike family of Osaka established a money exchange business. The exchange was chartered to provide services for the Tokugawa shogunate in 1670. In 1877, it was awarded a national bank charter. By the 1930s, Kōnoike was unable to compete with larger banks tied to zaibatsu conglomerates, so it merged with the Sanjushi Bank and Yamaguchi Bank. It became the largest bank in Japan in terms of assets during the years prior to World War II.

During the postwar era, Sanwa was a major financier of Japanese heavy industry as the central hub of the Sanwa Group keiretsu. It founded Japan Credit Bureau (JCB) in 1961, becoming a pioneer of the Japanese credit card business. At the height of the Japanese asset price bubble in 1988, it was the world's fifth-largest bank by total assets, just behind its domestic peers Dai-Ichi Kangyo Bank, Sumitomo Bank, Fuji Bank, and Mitsubishi Bank.

In the 1990s, it was the most profitable bank in the world, and second-largest in terms of assets behind its eventual merger partner Tokyo-Mitsubishi.

Following the collapse of the Japanese asset price bubble and a wave of bank mergers in the 1990s, Sanwa entered into merger talks with Tokai Bank and Asahi Bank, and the three banks announced a merger in 2001, which would create the third-largest bank in the world behind Deutsche Bank and Mizuho Financial Group. Asahi pulled out of these talks later that year and The Toyo Trust & Banking Co. added to the merger group, the combined company then to be called United Financial Holdings of Japan. The merger was completed in 2002 and the new bank was called UFJ Bank Ltd. (株式会社ユーエフジェイ銀行, Kabushiki kaisha Yūefujei Ginkō).
