= DKB Group =

Japanese corporate group

The DKB Group (第一勧銀グループ, Dai'ichi Kangin Gurūpu) or the Dai-Ichi Kangyo Group was the largest Japanese keiretsu in the late 1990s.

The group emerged after World War II and coalesced around the Dai-Ichi Kangyo Bank. Two of DKB's largest clients, Kawasaki Heavy Industries and Furukawa Electric, led their own respective corporate groups with a cross-supply relationship between the two. The Kawasaki and Furukawa groups agreed to begin holding presidents' meetings in 1966. Itochu, which historically supplied Kawasaki with raw materials, became the main general trading company for the combined group.

The group's presidents began regular Sankin-kai (三金会) meetings in 1971. Also in that year, the group's name developed from the merger of Dai-Ichi Bank and Nippon Kangyo Bank. In 1998, an announcement was made that the Dai-Ichi Kangyo Bank was to be merged with Fuji Bank and the Industrial Bank of Japan to form Mizuho Financial Group. The resulting group, which was established in September 2000, was the largest banking group in the world with assets of 140 trillion yen. The next few years saw a parallel consolidation of their keiretsu industrial partners and saw the group grow to 150 trillion yen in assets (30% GDP).

== Companies ==
- Asahi Mutual Life Insurance
- The Dai-ichi Mutual Life Insurance Company
- Daiichi Sankyo
- Dentsu
- Fujitsu
- Hitachi
- IHI Corporation
- Isuzu
- ITOCHU
- JFE Holdings
- Kawasaki Heavy Industries
- K Line
- Kobe Steel
- Meiji Seika
- Mizuho Financial Group
- Nippon Columbia
- Seibu Department Stores
- Sojitz
- Sompo Japan Insurance
- Taiheiyo Cement
- Tokyo Broadcasting System
- Tokyo Dome
- The Tokyo Electric Power Company
- Tokyo FM
- Toshiba
- Toyota
- Yokohama Rubber Company

== See also ==
- Fuyo Group
