= Ishigaki Rin =

Japanese poet

Ishigaki Rin (石垣 りん; February 21, 1920 – December 26, 2004) was a Japanese poet, most famous for her poem "Nameplate." She was known as the "bank clerk poet" because all of her writing was done on the side of her job as a clerk at the Industrial Bank of Japan, and her work frequently appeared in her employer's newsletter. Like her friend and contemporary Ibaragi Noriko, she was openly critical of environmental devastation, war, and nuclear power. Some of her poems are used in Japanese language textbooks, and she is therefore one of the best-known contemporary poets in Japan.

== Biography ==
Ishigaki was born in Akasaka, Tokyo in 1920. After she finished junior high school in 1934, she went to work for Industrial Bank of Japan where she continued to work until 1975. Her income sustained her aging family through World War II, and she never married.

While working at the bank she joined a literary group, and she began to write poems. In 1959 she published her first collection, The Pan, the Pot, the Burning Fire I Have in Front of Me. In 1968 she published her second, Nameplate and other works. This book won the annual Mr. H Award (H-shi-sho, H氏賞) in 1969, which is given to the best book of poetry by a new Japanese poet published in the previous year. In those days it was uncommon for a woman to work full-time in Japan, and she was sometimes referred to as 'the bank clerk poet'.

She published four collections of her own poetry, as well as edited two anthologies which contained both her own works and others', and wrote some books in which she expressed her opinions and told her life story.

Her best known work is "Nameplate." This was based on two experiences where she stayed in a hospital room and at an inn. At the entrance to those two rooms her name was displayed with the honorific words Sama and Dono. This is often done and most people don't mind it or consider it something unnecessary, but these honorifics made her uneasy. She began the poem "To the place where I live in/it is best to put my nameplate by myself", and then told of her two experiences. If she allows someone to put up a nameplate for her, then she can't deny the adding of an honorific word. She continued "Then will I be able to deny it?" But she denied any honorific addition for herself. "Also where you put a base for your spirit,/ you must put a nameplate for yourself / Ishigaki Rin / that's good for me." Later she wrote in an afterword of one of her books, "I was born to create one work, Nameplate."

== Works ==
=== Poetry books ===
- 私の前にある鍋とお釜と燃える火と, 1959. 1st book: The Pan, the Pot, the Burning Fire I Have in Front of Me
- 表札など, 1968. 2nd book: Nameplate and other works
- 略歴, 1979. 3rd book: Curriculum Vitae
- やさしい言葉, 1984. 4th book: Tender words
