= Mizuho Information & Research Institute =

Mizuho Information & Research Institute, Inc. (みずほ情報総研株式会社, Mizuho Jōhō Sōken Kabushiki Kaisha) is a Japanese information technology company that “provides assistance to corporations in increasing their corporate value through its consulting, system integration and outsourcing service.” As of 2017 it had 4700 employees. The Institute was formed by the merging of DKB Information Systems, Fuji Research Institute Corporation, and IBJ Systems Ltd. (all owned by Mizuho Financial Group) on October 1, 2004. In 2021, Mizuho Information & Research Institute merged with Mizuho Research Institute to form Mizuho Research & Technologies.
