= Deposit market share =

The deposit market share is a way of measuring the size and performance of a bank in the United States based on the banks total amount of deposits. It is the amount on deposit at a particular bank divided by the total amount on deposit at all banks.

In practice however, the term is used to refer to the deposit market share of commercial banks and savings and loan organizations calculated by the Federal Deposit Insurance Corporation (FDIC). The FDIC calculations do not include money deposited at credit unions, and the cash accounts at brokerage firms.

== Importance of this metric ==
This metric is considered by many to be an important banking performance measure although many regard it as is misleading for the following reasons:

- FDIC insured deposits have been reducing since the early 2000s as bank customers have elected to put their funds into stocks, bonds, mutual funds, and annuities. The amount in mutual funds is double the amount in bank accounts, the amount of money in Money Market Funds is the same as in checking accounts. These businesses are as profitable or even more so to the financial services company than normal bank accounts, so if customers are moving money from a particular bank's normal bank accounts to bank-owned mutual funds, the bank does not lose anything. If one was only looking at deposit market shares however, it would appear to shrink.
- Deposit market share does not include credit unions.
- Deposit market share gives no indication as to how many other financial products and services a particular bank's depositors might be buying from that bank. For example, Bank X might have a 10% deposit market share, yet if all those depositors simply have checking accounts and nothing else with that Bank, it would make nowhere near as much money as Bank Y in the same market, who might have 2% deposit market share yet successfully sell mutual funds, mortgages, and insurance.

== Use in antitrust proceedings ==
When two banks merge, a survey is done to ensure that the combined deposit market shares will be no larger than 25% in a particular state, or 10% nationally. If one or both of those percentages are higher than allowed, the banks can elect to still do the merger but they would need to divest (i.e. sell off branches and customer accounts) enough branches to get them within the guidelines.
