= Mizuho Securities =

Japanese investment banking company

Mizuho Securities Co., Ltd.

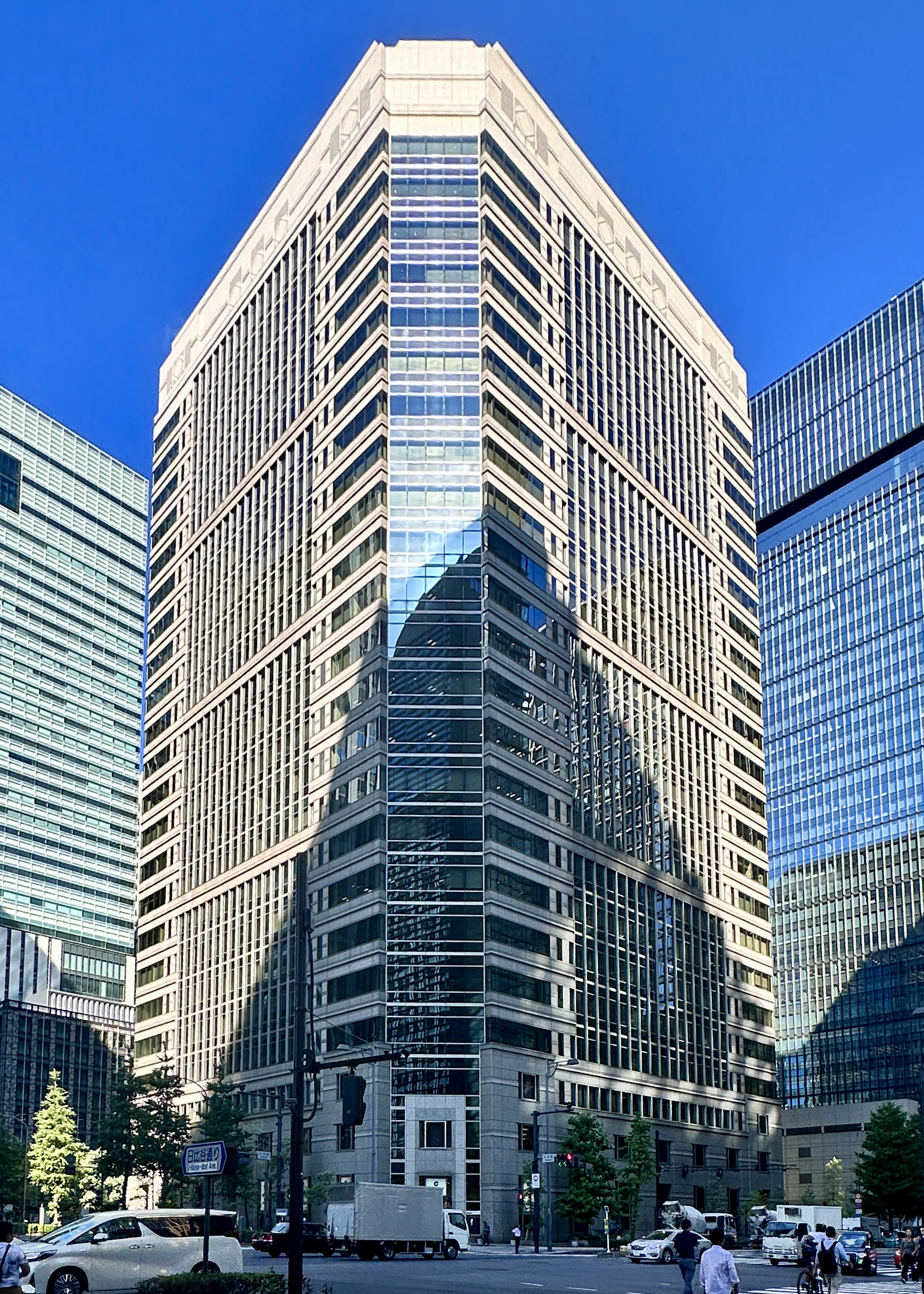
- Headquarters in Ōtemachi, Chiyoda, Tokyo
- Native name: みずほ証券株式会社
- Romanized name: Mizuho Shōken Kabushiki-gaisha
- Type: Subsidiary
- Traded as: TYO: 8606
- Industry: Financial services
- Predecessor: Shinko Securities
- Founded: July 16, 1917
- Headquarters: Ōtemachi, Tokyo, Japan
- Services: Securities brokerage Investment banking Securities research
- Number of employees: 6,820 (March 2024)
- Parent: Mizuho Financial Group
- Website: mizuhogroup.com/securities

Mizuho Securities Co., Ltd. (みずほ証券株式会社, Mizuho Shōken Kabushiki-gaisha) is a Japanese investment banking and securities firm. It is a wholly owned subsidiary of Mizuho Financial Group.

== History ==
The current Mizuho Securities is established by a merger between Shinko Securities and the former Mizuho Securities. The former Shinko Securities (a former equity-method affiliate of Mizuho Financial Group) and the former Mizuho Securities (a former consolidated subsidiary of Mizuho Financial Group) merged on 7 May 2009 after it was postponed due to the 2008 financial crisis. The surviving entity was the former Shinko Securities, which changed its name to Mizuho Securities upon the merger. After the merger, Mizuho Financial Group holds 59.51% equity ownership of the new Mizuho Securities. In 2004, the Polaris Capital Group was divested, focusing on private equity investment. Mizuho Securities is involved in bond and stock trading, debt and equity financing, and advisory services for structured finance; its clients include financial institutions, public corporations, and institutional investors or firms. It also issues buy and sell ratings for publicly traded stocks. During the early 2000s, it was considered to be one of the "big four" firms that controlled a large portion of Japanese trading. In December 2005, an employee at Mizuho Securities placed an erroneous sell order of J-COM Co., Ltd. shares on the Tokyo Stock Exchange, resulting in a loss of approximately ¥40.7 billion.

Mizuho Securities then brought a case for its damages against the Tokyo Stock Exchange (TSE) as they could not cancel the order due to a fault in the TSE's computer system. The president of TSE resigned in 2005. Mizuho was awarded approximately ¥10.7 billion. Mizuho Securities operates several subsidiaries, including Mizuho Securities USA, where the CEO is Gerald Rizzieri.
