= Mizuho Financial Group =

Japanese financial services group

Mizuho Financial Group, Inc.

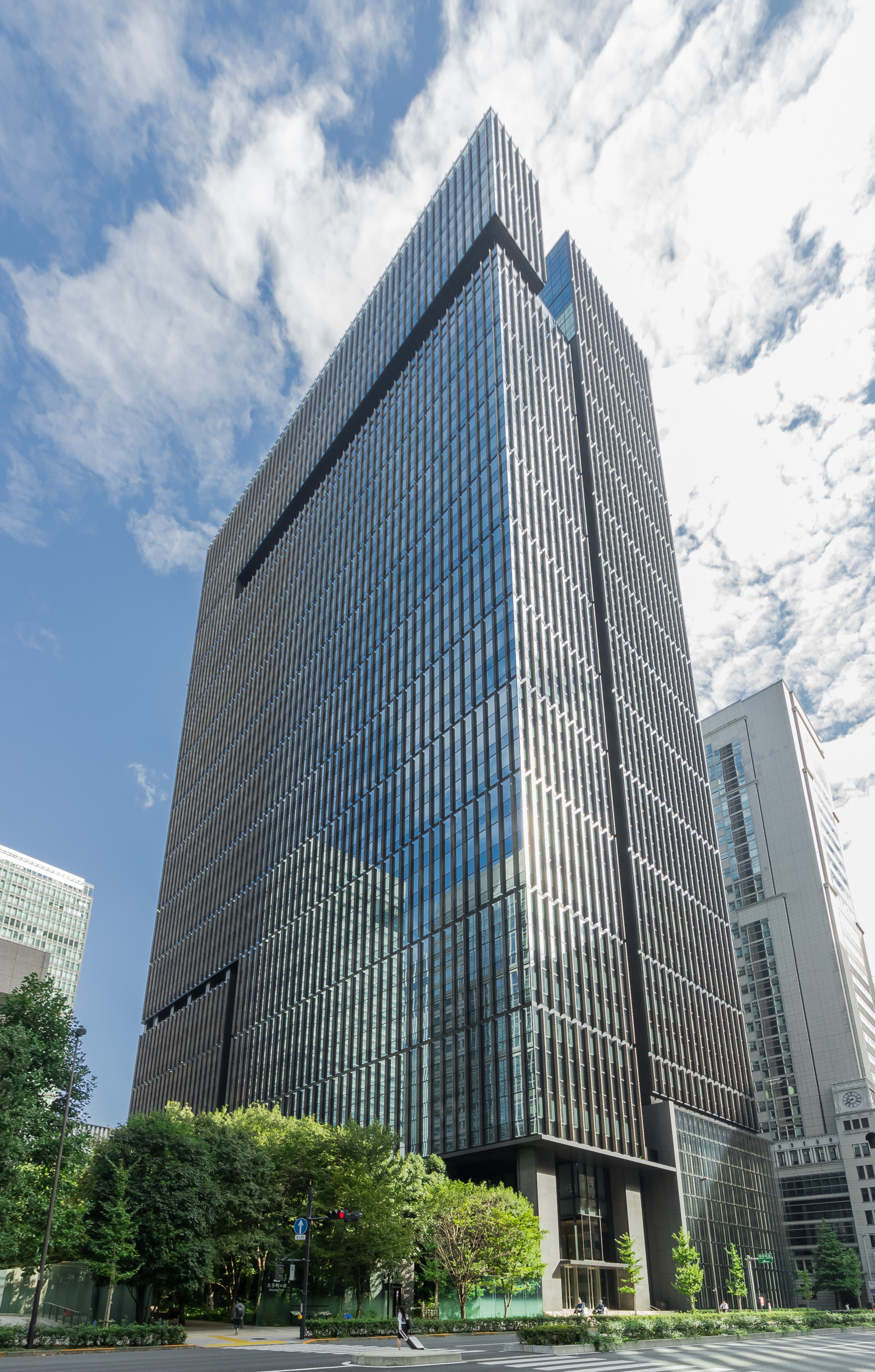
- Otemachi Tower in Tokyo, Mizuho head office since 2014
- Native name: 株式会社みずほフィナンシャルグループ
- Romanized name: Kabushiki gaisha Mizuho Finansharu Gurūpu
- Type: Public
- Traded as: TYO: 8411; NYSE: MFG; Nikkei 225 component; TOPIX Core 30 component
- Industry: Financial services
- Predecessors: Dai-Ichi Kangyo Bank; Fuji Bank; Industrial Bank of Japan
- Founded: September 2000; 26 years ago
- Headquarters: Otemachi Tower, Marunouchi, Chiyoda, Tokyo, Japan
- Key people: Seiji Imai (chairman); Masahiro Kihara (president & CEO)
- Products: Asset management; Banking; Commodities; Credit cards; Equities trading; Insurance; Investment management; Mortgage loans; Private equity; Wealth management
- Revenue: ▲¥9.09 trillion (US$82.78 billion) (FY2026)
- Operating income: ▲¥1.57 trillion (US$14.33 billion) (FY2026)
- Net income: ▲¥1.25 trillion (US$11.38 billion) (FY2026)
- Total assets: ▲¥302.24 trillion (US$2.75 trillion) (FY2026)
- Total equity: ▲¥12.68 trillion (US$115.54 billion) (FY2026)
- Number of employees: 52,400 (2026)
- Subsidiaries: Mizuho Bank; Mizuho Trust & Banking; Mizuho Securities
- Website: mizuhogroup.com

The Mizuho Financial Group, Inc. (株式会社みずほフィナンシャルグループ, Kabushiki-gaisha Mizuho Finansharu Gurūpu), known from 2000 to 2003 as Mizuho Holdings and abbreviated as MHFG or simply Mizuho, is a Japanese banking holding company headquartered in the Ōtemachi district of Chiyoda, Tokyo, Japan. The group was formed in 2000–2002 by merger of Dai-Ichi Kangyo Bank, Fuji Bank, and Industrial Bank of Japan. The name mizuho (瑞穂) literally means "abundant rice" in Japanese and "harvest" in the figurative sense.

Mizuho Financial Group is the parent holding of Mizuho Bank, Mizuho Trust & Banking, Mizuho Securities, and Mizuho Capital, and the majority owner of Asset Management One. The group offers a range of financial services, including banking, securities, trust and asset management services, employing more than 59,000 people throughout 880 offices. It is listed on the Tokyo Stock Exchange—where it is a constituent of the Nikkei 225 and TOPIX Core30 indices—and in the New York Stock Exchange in the form of American depositary receipts.

Upon its founding, Mizuho was the largest bank in the world by assets. Following further consolidation, it has become the third-largest of Japan's so-called megabanks with total assets of $1.9 trillion at end-March 2023, behind Mitsubishi UFJ Financial Group ($2.9 trillion) and SMBC Group ($2.0 trillion). Mizuho was the 15th largest banking institution in the world by total assets as of December 2018, and the 90th largest company in the world according to Forbes rankings as of May 2017. It has been consistently listed as a systemically important bank by the Financial Stability Board.

== History ==
The history of the banks that formed Mizuho combines multiple threads of Japanese financial history, going back to the early Meiji era and particularly the establishment in 1873 of Dai-Ichi Bank, Japan's first modern bank and joint-stock company led by Shibusawa Eiichi, if not even earlier with the foundation of trading house Yasuda-ya in 1864. In addition to Dai-Ichi (whose name literally means "number one"), Mizuho also incorporates several of the subsequent National Banks in Meiji Japan which were numbered in accordance with their chronological date of establishment until 1880:

- the 3rd National Bank, licensed in 1873 with a view to establish a bank in Osaka, then established in Tokyo in 1876 after the previous plan was shelved; merged 1923 with multiple other banks to form Yasuda Bank, which in 1948 was renamed Fuji Bank;
- the 6th National Bank, est. 1877 in Fukushima, relocated 1892 to Tokyo, merged 1907 into the 9th Bank (below);
- the 9th National Bank, est. 1877 in Kumamoto, absorbed the 6th Bank in 1907 and became the Higo Bank which in 1923 merged with the 3rd Bank and others to form the Yasuda Bank;
- the 20th National Bank, est. 1877 in Tokyo, merged 1912 into Dai-Ichi Bank;
- the 22nd National Bank, est. 1877 in Okayama, another participant in the 1923 merger that formed Yasuda Bank;
- the 36th National bank, est. 1878 in Hachiōji, acquired 1942 by Nihon Chuya Bank which merged into Yasuda Bank in 1943;
- the 40th National Bank, est. 1878 in Tatebayashi, merged 1918 with the 41st Bank to form Tokai Bank (namesake of but different from the later Tokai Bank) which itself merged into Dai-Ichi Bank in 1927;
- the 41st National Bank, est. 1878 in Tochigi, merged 1918 with the 40th Bank;
- the 44th National Bank, est. 1878 in Tokyo, merged 1882 into the 3rd National Bank;
- the 58th National Bank, est. 1878 in Osaka, merged 1909 into the 130th Bank (see below);
- the 64th National Bank, est. 1878 in Ōtsu, renamed Otsu Bank in 1898 and merged 1908 into Omi Bank which collapsed in 1928 and was absorbed by Showa Bank, itself merged 1944 into Yasuda Bank;
- the 82nd National Bank, est. 1878 in Tottori, merged 1897 into the 3rd Bank;
- the 84th National Bank, est. 1878 in Daishōji, acquired 1928 by Showa Bank;
- the 87th National Bank, est. 1878 in Ōhashi, merged 1902 into the 130th Bank;
- the 103rd National Bank, est. 1878 in Iwakuni, acquired 1893 by the Bank of Japan which merged 1923 into Yasuda Bank;
- the 118th National Bank, est. 1878 in Tokyo, merged 1880 into the 136th National Bank (see below);
- the 130th National Bank, est. 1879 in Osaka, merged 1923 into Yasuda Bank;
- the 136th National Bank, est. 1879 in Handa, merged 1898 into the 130th Bank.

The group's predecessors also include Nippon Kangyo Bank (est. 1897) and Industrial Bank of Japan (est. 1902), two institutions founded as policy banks in the Meiji era and converted into commercial banks after World War II.

=== Founding merger ===
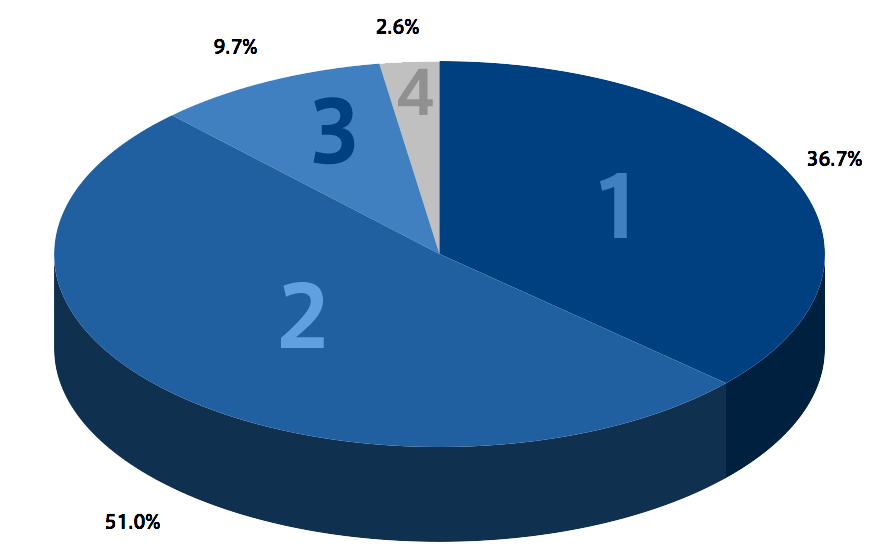
Mizuho annual income by division in 2005: 1. Mizuho Bank; 2. Mizuho Corporate Bank; 3. Mizuho Trust; 4. Mizuho Securities

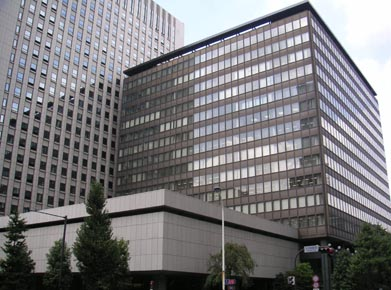
The former head office building of Fuji Bank in Ōtemachi, completed in 1990, served as headquarters of Mizuho Financial Group from the merger until demolition in 2012

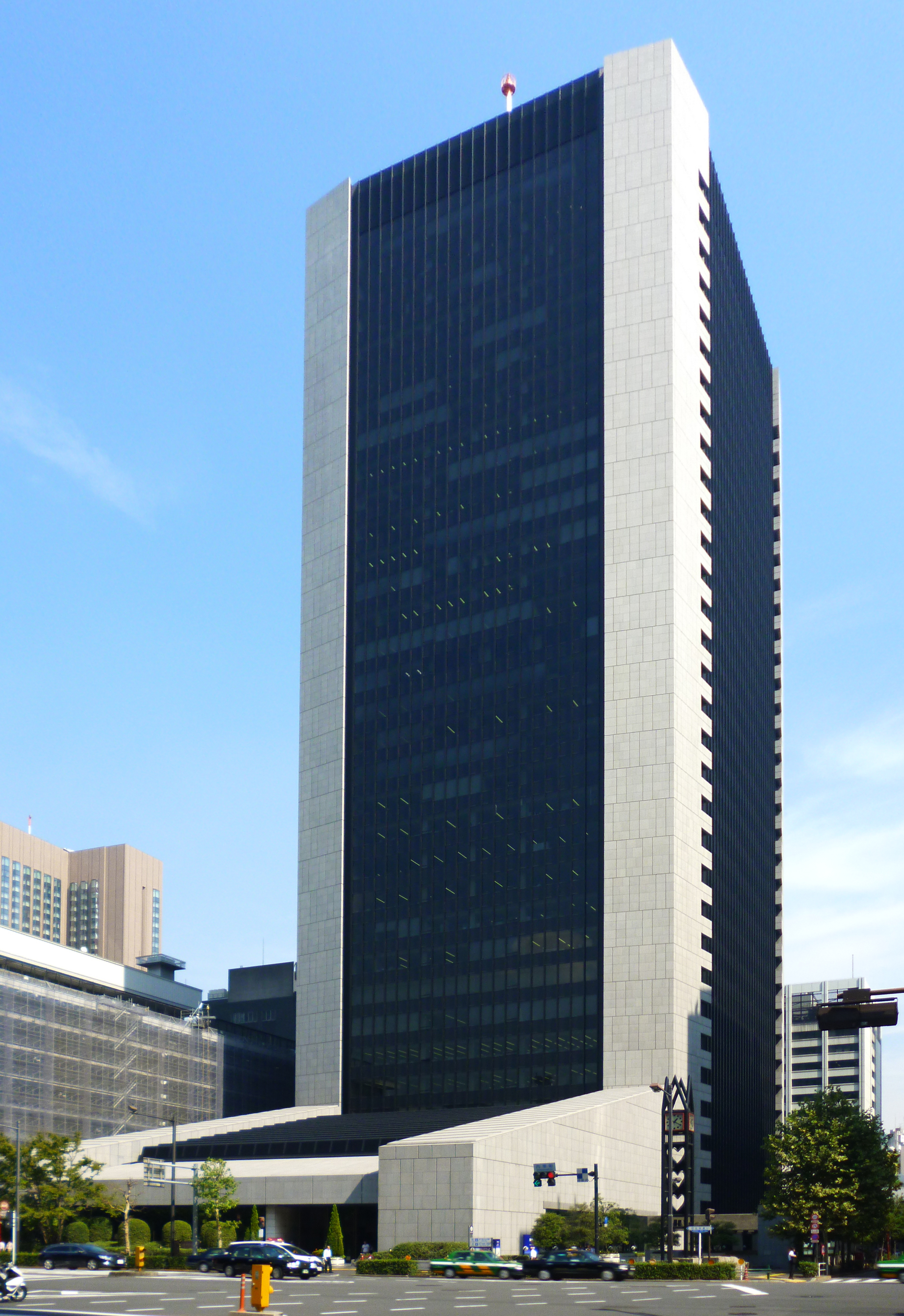
The former head office of Dai-Ichi Kangyo Bank in Hibiya, completed in 1981, served as headquarters of Mizuho Bank from the merger until 2014 and was demolished in 2022

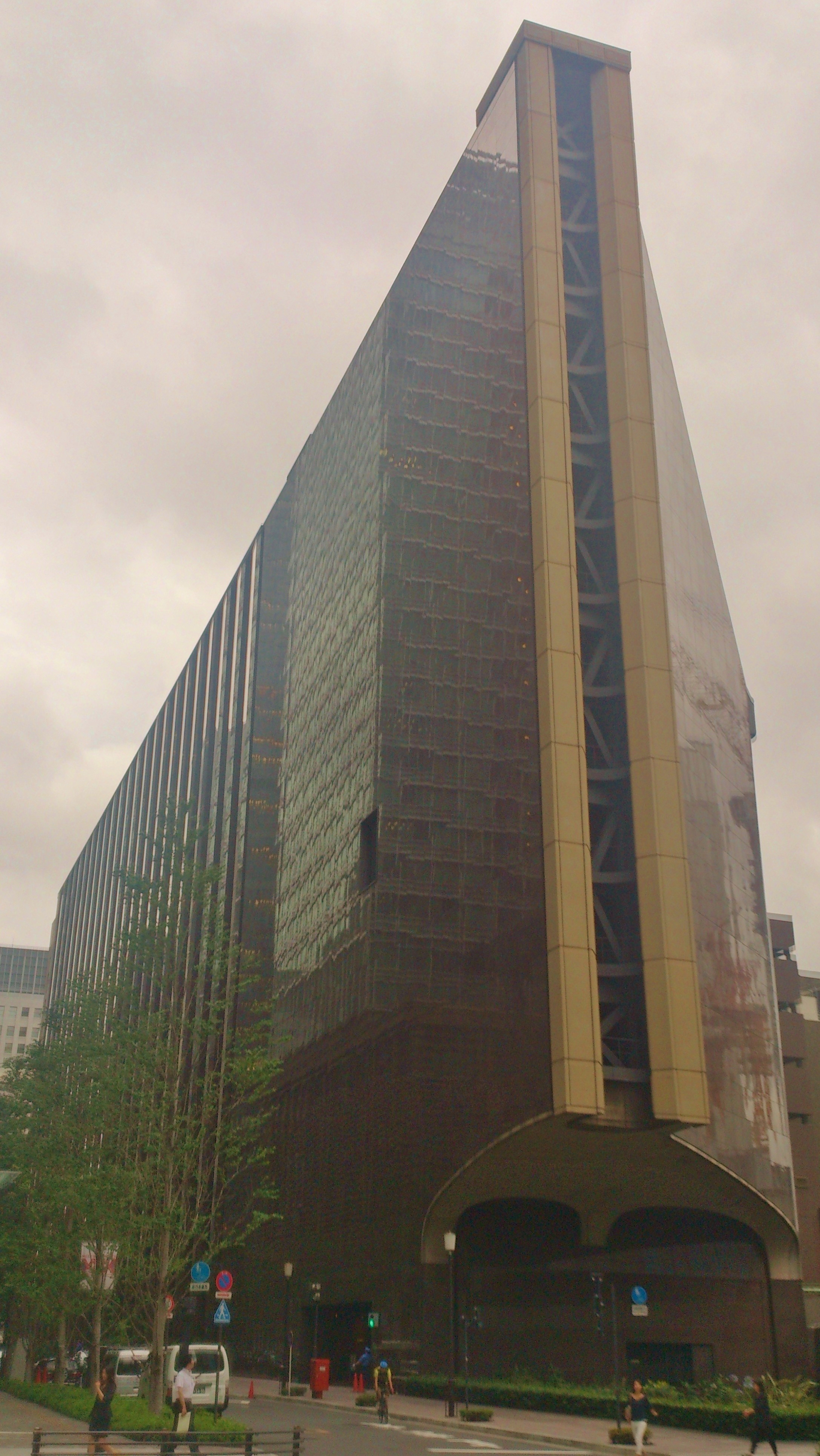
The former head office of Industrial Bank of Japan in Marunouchi, inaugurated 1974, was used by Mizuho until its demolition in 2016

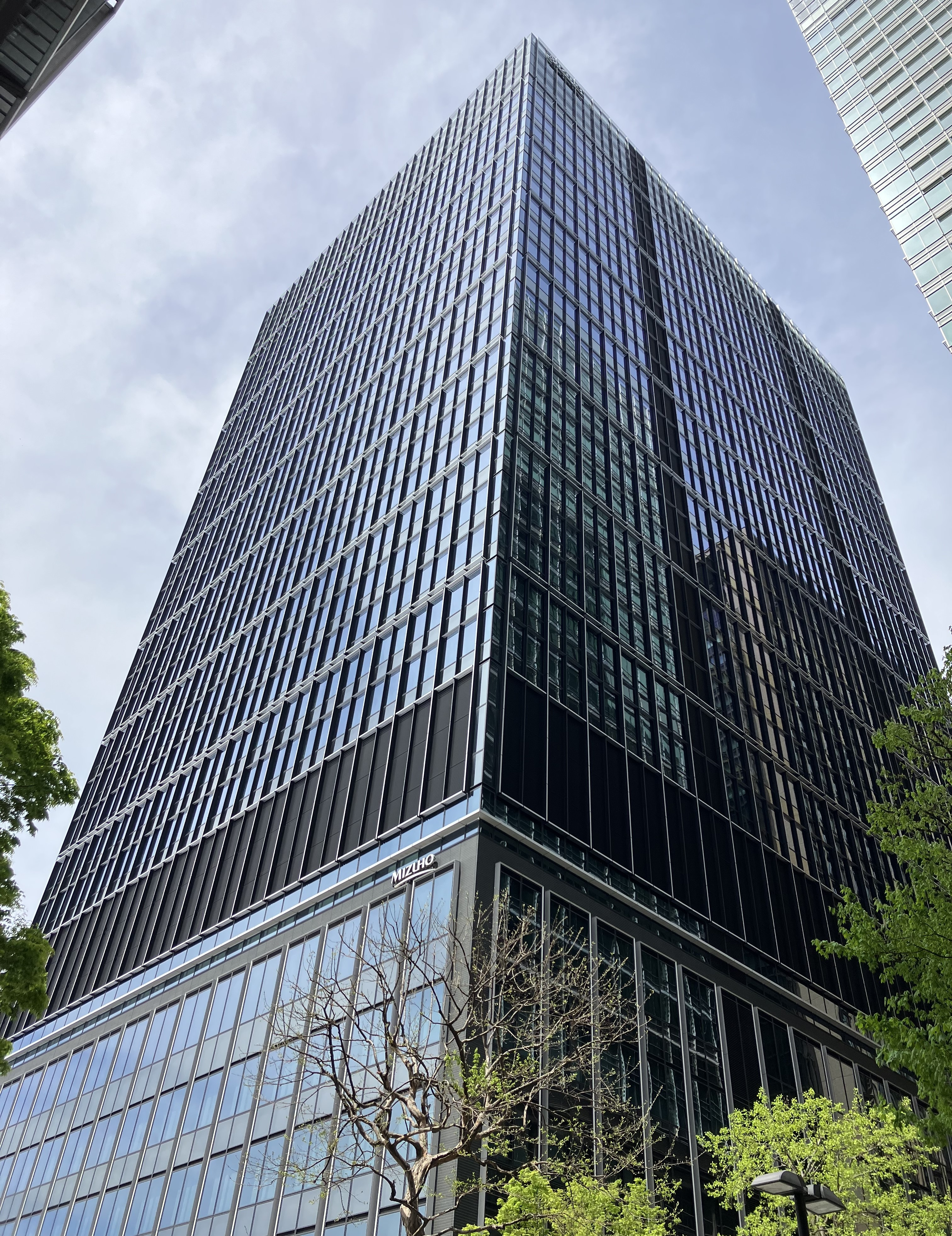
The Mizuho Marunouchi Tower was erected on the former site of the IBJ head office (as well as the Tokyo Bankers Association Building and the Bank Kaikan Building), and is part of the Mizuho head office cluster

Mizuho was established in 2000 as Mizuho Holdings, Inc. by the merger of Dai-Ichi Kangyo Bank, Fuji Bank, and the Industrial Bank of Japan, first announced in 1999. It was the first financial holding company structure created among major Japanese banks.

On 1 April 2002, DKB, Fuji and IBJ were officially and legally combined into two banks, Mizuho Bank, Ltd. and Mizuho Corporate Bank, Ltd., through a split and merger process reorganizing the three legacy banks. Initially Mizuho traded under the ticker symbol MHHD on the London Stock Exchange. Mizuho Corporate Bank focused on large corporations, financial institutions and public sector entities in Japan and overseas, whereas Mizuho Bank focused on individuals and small and medium-sized companies in Japan.

The merger resulted in the world's first trillion-dollar banking group, with its $1.2 trillion in assets, surpassing the next largest bank by about $480 billion. The move has been considered to have formed one of the first "mega-institutions" in the financial industry, beginning a trend in the industry of large-scale bank mergers referred to in Japan as the consolidation movement during the 2000s. While other mega-institutions were composed of one major player and several minor ones, Mizuho was composed of three relatively equal institutions in terms of their size and influence. It remained the largest mega-bank in the world until 2005.

The name "Mizuho" means "new, bountiful, and rich harvest of rice" in Japanese. The original structure saw the founding of the Mizuho Bank, focusing on individuals and SMEs, and the Mizuho Corporate Bank, which focuses on corporate entities. The initial strategy of the company was to expand its lending operations with individuals and SMEs, and begin to offer fee-based services including securitizations, merger and acquisitions support, security-based investment banking, and syndicated loans. At the time, Mizuho controlled about 50% of the syndicated loans market. Mizuho also launched one of the first Internet-based securities products in 2000.

In 2003, Mizuho Financial Group, Inc. took over the operations of Mizuho Holdings. On 1 October 2005, all subsidiaries of Mizuho Holdings were transferred to the direct control of Mizuho Financial Group. Mizuho Holdings, no longer a bank holding company, was then renamed Mizuho Financial Strategy, which now focuses on providing advisory services. Mizuho Financial Group was in turn listed on the New York Stock Exchange under the stock symbol MFG in 2006.

=== Subsequent development ===
Mizuho Corporate Bank engaged in steady expansion overseas, opening twenty overseas offices between 2005 and 2010, particularly in China, as well as in the Americas, Europe and Middle East. In 2006, Mizuho Corporate Bank became the first Japanese bank to obtain financial holding company status in the U.S., and Mizuho Financial Group listed its ADRs on the New York Stock Exchange.

Mizuho, through its operations in New York, became involved in the subprime mortgage crisis and lost seven billion dollars on the sale of collateralized debt obligations backed by subprime mortgages. It is the Asian bank which suffered the most losses due to the crisis. In 2012 Mizuho Financial Group acquired 100% of the assets from the Brazilian bank Banco WestLB do Brasil S.A.

On 30 June 2013, the group structure was simplified by a merger of Mizuho Bank and Mizuho Corporate Bank into a single banking entity that retained the name Mizuho Bank.

In 2014 the company underwent a board of directors reform to further streamline its corporate culture into a more of a single identity, although its original board founded in 2002 was consistent with Japanese banking protocols. In 2016 they opened their global transactions banking headquarters in Singapore, and have offices for this unit in China, Hong Kong, Tokyo, London, and New York City. That year they also began a partnership with Cognizant, to develop block-chain methods of securing the banks private records.

In December 2023, Mizuho completed its acquisition of the M&A advisory bank Greenhill & Co., stating its intent to capture a larger share of the U.S. M&A market.

== Divisions ==
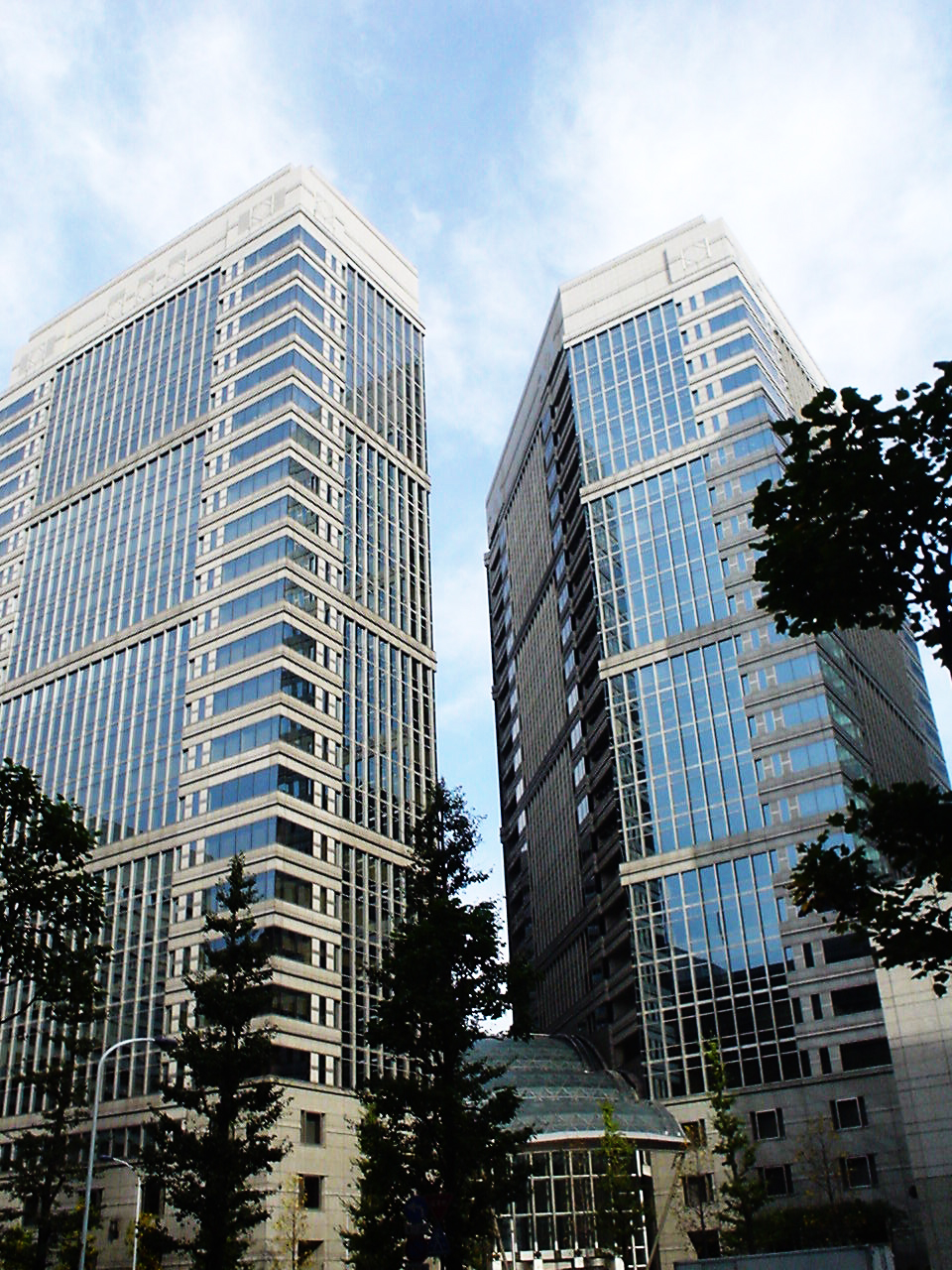
Ōtemachi First Square building in Tokyo, head office of Mizuho Securities

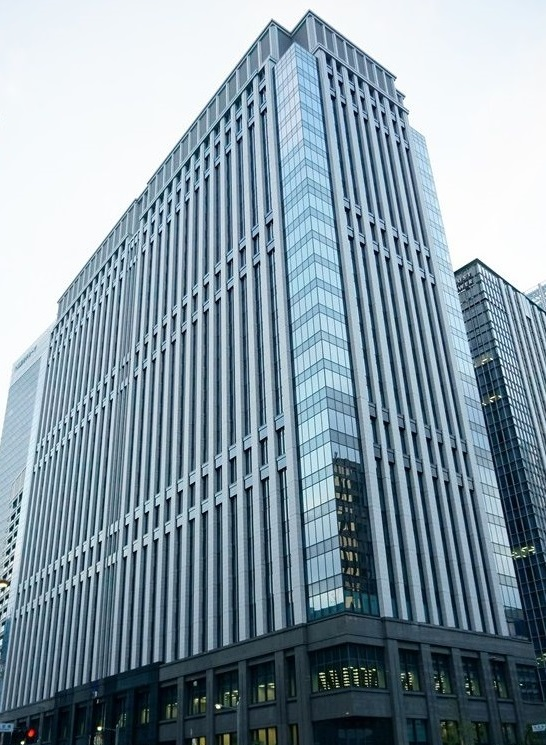
Tekko building in Marunouchi, Tokyo, head office of Asset Management One

Mizuho splits its business into four distinct divisions, on a global basis:

=== Retail Group ===
Mizuho is active in retail banking with 515 branches and over 11,000 automated teller machines (ATMs). Mizuho Bank is the only bank, other than Japan Post Bank, to have branches in every prefecture in Japan. It serves over 26 million Japanese households, 90,000 SME customers, 2500 corporations, and retail brokerage clients under the name Mizuho Investors Securities nationwide, with $114 billion in retail customer assets under its management as of 2016.

- Mizuho Bank
- Mizuho Capital

=== Global Corporate Group ===
Mizuho predecessors, the Dai-Ichi Kangyo Bank (DKB), the Fuji Bank (Fuji) and the Industrial Bank of Japan (IBJ), had great control over many Japanese companies through keiretsu system. The three banks led the DKB Group, Fuyo Group and the IBJ Group respectively. The Fuyo Group traces its history as far back as the old Yasuda zaibatsu. Even now, seven out of ten companies listed on the Tokyo Stock Exchange have dealings with Mizuho.

- Mizuho Securities

=== Global wealth and asset management ===
- Mizuho Trust & Banking
- Mizuho Private Wealth Management
- Asset Management One

Asset Management One manages a number of ETFs which are listed in Japan, but some of these ETFs are very illiquid because no market maker was appointed. For example, One ETF Gold (1683:JP) frequently trades at a discount of more than 10% to the NAV.

=== Strategy affiliates ===
- Mizuho Financial Strategy, formerly Mizuho Holdings, Inc.
- Mizuho Research Institute
- Mizuho Information & Research Institute

== Sponsorship ==
Mizuho is a sponsor of the Tokyo International Marathon and the 2020 Olympic Games and 2020 Paralympic Games.

== Notable employees ==
- Yoichiro Esaki, member of the House of Representatives
- Rin Ishigaki, poet
- Hirotaka Ishihara, member of the House of Representatives, son of Shintaro Ishihara
- Zenkichi Kojima, mayor of Shizuoka, Shizuoka
- Takeaki Matsumoto, member of the House of Representatives
- Shoichi Nakagawa, Minister of Finance, Minister of State in charge of Financial Services (2008–2009)
- Kei Ogura, singer
- Stanley Praimnath, survivor of the destruction of the World Trade Center on 11 September 2001
- Mitsu Shimojo, member of the House of Representatives
- Yukio Tomioka, member of the House of Councillors

== Controversies ==
In September 2013, a routine regulatory control unveiled that Mizuho enabled loans of up to $1.9 million to the yakuza (Japanese mafia). It also appeared that loans to the mob had been approved through its affiliate credit company Orient Corp. This scandal led to the resignation of the group's CEO Takashi Tsukamoto.

In December 2019, a report named Mizuho as the top private lender to coal developers between January 2017 and September 2019. In March 2020, Japanese NGO Kiko Network filed the first climate related shareholder resolution with a Japanese company proposing Mizuho align its investments with the goals of the Paris Agreement, which was followed by investor support for the resolution. In response, Mizuho has agreed not to finance any further coal projects, and to end all existing loans for coal projects by the year 2050.

== See also ==
- Dai-Ichi Kangyo Bank
- Fuji Bank
- Industrial Bank of Japan
- List of banks in Japan
