= Dai-Ichi Kangyo Bank =

Japanese bank (1971–2002)

The Dai-ichi Kangyo Bank, Limited

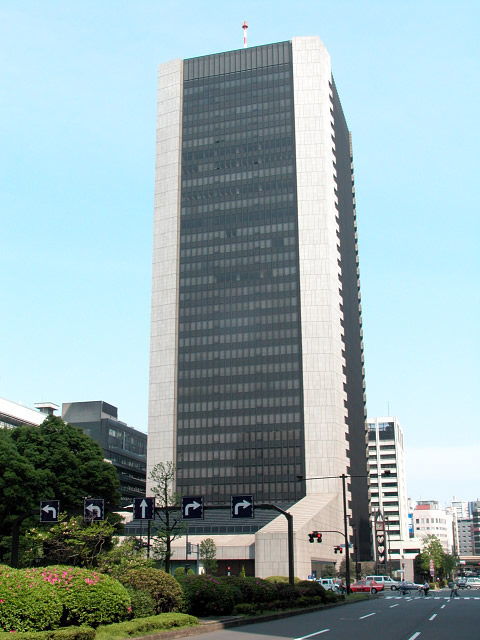
- Dai-Ichi Kangyo Bank Head Office Building in Hibiya, Tokyo, completed 1981 and eventually demolished in 2022
- Native name: 株式会社第一勧業銀行
- Romanized name: Kabushiki-gaisha Dai-ichi Kangyō Ginkō
- Type: Public
- Traded as: TYO: 8311
- Industry: Bank
- Predecessor: Dai-Ichi Bank (1873-1971); Nippon Kangyo Bank (1897-1971)
- Founded: 1971; 55 years ago
- Founder: Shibusawa Eiichi
- Defunct: 2002
- Fate: Merged with Fuji Bank and the Industrial Bank of Japan in 2000
- Successor: Mizuho Financial Group
- Headquarters: Tokyo, Japan
- Number of employees: 14,714 (2001)
- Website: www.dkb.co.jp

The Dai-ichi Kangyo Bank, Limited, abbreviated as DKB (第一勧銀, Dai'ichi Kangin), was one of the largest banks in the world during the latter third of the 20th century. It was created in 1971 by merger of Dai-Ichi Bank, Japan's oldest bank, and Nippon Kangyo Bank, a state financial institution that granted long-term loans to industry and agriculture. By the late 1980s, at the height of the Japanese asset price bubble, it had become the world's largest bank by total assets, ahead of its domestic rivals Sumitomo Bank, Fuji Bank, Mitsubishi Bank, and Sanwa Bank.

In 2000, DKB merged with Fuji Bank and the Industrial Bank of Japan to form Mizuho Financial Group. In 2002, DKB's corporate & investment banking division was transferred to Mizuho Corporate Bank, while its retail banking division was transferred to Mizuho Bank.

== History ==
In 1971, Dai-ichi Bank and Nippon Kangyo Bank merged to form DKB, which instantly surpassed longtime leader the Fuji Bank as the largest Japanese bank measured by assets and deposit market share. DKB formed the core of the DKB Group (or Dai-Ichi Kangyo Group), the largest Japanese keiretsu in terms of the number of associated companies, and became the central bank of DKB Group.

Taking over Nippon Kangyo and Noko's operation, DKB was the sole trustee of the Takarakuji lottery and was the only bank to have branches in every prefecture in Japan.

DKB executives worried about the recurrence of the problem in their Teikoku Bank period when the two former banks' employees were on bad terms with each other. Therefore, they were particular about "a merger of equals." DKB's board of directors, for example, was always composed half-and-half of the former Dai-ichi members and former NKB members. The board of directors installed the former two banks members alternately as the next chairperson and president.

These practices backfired however, only causing difficulty among the employees similar to Teikoku Bank's case. Irrational personnel affairs prevented DKB from increasing revenue and profit. Although DKB had more assets than any other Japanese bank, its capabilities were inferior to high-performing banks such as Fuji, Sumitomo, Sanwa or Mitsubishi.

== Controversy ==
During the Japanese asset price bubble of the late 1980s, Japanese banks, including DKB, granted increasingly risky loans. Even worse, DKB financed not only high-risk companies but also yakuza, in order to invest in capital resources more easily than its competitors. Furthermore, loans to sōkaiya (corporate racketeers) amounted to 30 billion JPY.

After the bubble's collapse, these bad loans were judged to be poor value for money. A raid by Tokyo prosecutors in 1997 impeaching of the loans to sōkaiya laid DKB open to public criticism. Kuniji Miyazaki (宮崎 邦次, Miyazaki Kuniji; 1930–1997), former president and then chairperson of DKB, who faced severe pressure over a series of alleged misdeeds, committed suicide by hanging himself in his home.

DKB combined with Fuji Bank and the Industrial Bank of Japan in 2000, forming Mizuho Financial Group. In 2002, DKB's corporate & investment banking division was transferred to Mizuho Corporate Bank and its retail banking division to Mizuho Bank respectively.

== Dai-Ichi Kangyo Credit Cooperative ==
The Dai-Ichi Kangyo name remains in use by a Shinjuku, Tokyo-based credit union, Dai-Ichi Kangyo Credit Cooperative (第一勧業信用組合), which was founded as a credit union for Nippon Kangyo Bank employees during the Taisho era. It remains active in the Tokyo region with over 45,000 members, and uses a modified version of the Dai-Ichi Kangyo Bank branding.

== Bibliography ==
- Takasugi, Ryo. (1992), The Great Merger, Kodansha, ISBN 4-06-185234-5
- Takasugi, Ryo. (1998), The Spell, Kadokawa Shoten
- Annual Report 1999, Dai-ichi Kangyo Bank, 1999, archived from the original on 22 July 2011
- The Reason Why The Chairman Committed Suicide, Shinchosha: The Yomiuri Shimbun, 2000, ISBN 4-10-134831-6
