= Yasuda / Fuji Bank =

Former Japanese bank

The Fuji Bank, Limited
- The Fuji Bank logo

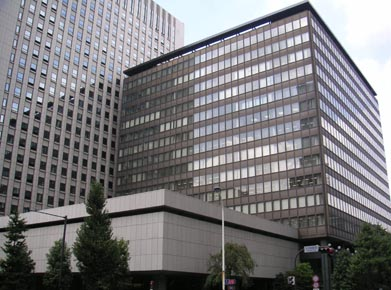
- Former head office of Fuji Bank in Tokyo, later head office of Mizuho Financial Group until demolition in 2012
- Type: Public
- Traded as: TYO: 8317
- Industry: Financial services
- Founded: 1864; 162 years ago
- Founder: Zenjiro Yasuda
- Defunct: 2000
- Headquarters: Tokyo, Japan
- Number of employees: 12,940 (2001)
- Website: www.fujibank.co.jp

The Yasuda Bank (Japanese: 安田銀行) from 1880 to 1948, then Fuji Bank (富士銀行) from 1948 to 2000, was one of the largest Japanese banks for much of the 20th century, together with Dai-Ichi Bank, Mitsubishi Bank, Mitsui Bank, and Sumitomo Bank. It was the main bank of the Yasuda zaibatsu until World War II, and afterwards of the Fuyo Group. By 1988 at the height of the Japanese asset price bubble, it had become the world's third-largest bank by total assets.

The Fuji Bank combined with Dai-Ichi Kangyo Bank and the Industrial Bank of Japan in 2000 to form Mizuho Financial Group, and changed its name to Mizuho Corporate Bank in 2002 after transferring its retail banking operations to Mizuho Bank.

== History ==
=== Yasuda Bank ===
The bank traces its history back to the old Yasuda zaibatsu. Zenjiro Yasuda, a migrant from Toyama, opened a dry goods store in the Nihonbashi area of Edo in 1864, known as Yasuda-ya (lit. House of Yasuda). After the Meiji Restoration in 1869, the company underwrote bonds for the Japanese government, whose credit standing was low then, and financed many public works such as railroads, harbor constructions, and so forth. The company was incorporated in 1880 with a share capital of 10 million yen. In 1912, Yasuda-ya was incorporated and renamed Yasuda Bank, in a process where Yasuda absorbed the assets and business of seventeen different Japanese banking institutions.

In the Taishō period, the Japanese banking community was thrown into financial difficulties because of World War I and the 1923 Great Kantō earthquake. In the immediate wake of the earthquake, Yasuda absorbed ten smaller regional banks which lacked a sufficient financial base to cover their deposits. This merger made Yasuda Bank the largest in Japan by several measures, with share capital of 150 million yen, deposits of 542 million yen, loans of 521 million yen, 211 branches and 3,700 employees.

The Yasuda Bank's activity remained entirely domestic. By 1929, it had no offices outside of Japan and its colonies, in contrast to its commercial banking peers Mitsubishi Bank, Mitsui Bank and Sumitomo Bank, let alone the Yokohama Specie Bank, Bank of Chōsen and Bank of Taiwan for which foreign trade was part of a public-interest mandate under special legislation.

=== After World War II ===
Following World War II, the Yasuda zaibatsu was dissolved by the Supreme Commander of the Allied Powers. On October 1, 1948, Yasuda Bank changed its name to Fuji Bank, named after Mount Fuji. Fuji formed the Fuyo Group, one of the largest keiretsu, together with other former Yasuda zaibatsu companies.

As the Japanese economy was rebuilt after the war, Fuji Bank expanded its business in syndicated lending, corporate banking, public money management, mortgages and retail financial services. It worked with other major banks as partners when it was at risk of over-extending its funds. However, the formation of Dai-Ichi Kangyo Bank (DKB) in 1971 dethroned Fuji from its top status in the Japanese banking industry. In an attempt to restore its preeminence, Fuji agreed to merge with Osaka-based Sanwa Bank in the late 1970s, but failed to win approval from the Ministry of Finance. Sumitomo Bank also rose as an intense competitor to Fuji in the 1980s, and both banks aggressively courted similar corporate banking clients, growing their loan portfolios dramatically with what would later become non-performing loans. Fuji Capital Markets Corp. was founded in New York in 1990 going on to become one of the lead players in the swaps market. FCMC went on to open offices in London in 1992 and Hong Kong in 1994 which still exist as Mizuho Capital Markets Corp. FCMC was one of the first Japanese Banks to connect to the internet, registering the fcmc.com domain in 1993. However, following the collapse of the Japanese asset price bubble in the early 1990s, Fuji and other Japanese banks were increasingly troubled by bad loans and inadequate back-office systems. Fuji attempted to diversify its domestic services, establishing Fuji Securities and Fuji Trust & Banking Co. in 1994, but neither subsidiary was able to make substantial profits.

On November 24, 1997, Yamaichi, Fuji Bank's affiliated securities firm, announced it would cease operations and was declared bankrupt by the Tokyo District Court. Fuji's inability to support Yamaichi led to a rapid fall in Fuji's stock price on the Tokyo Stock Exchange. Between 1998 and 2000, Fuji laid off thousands of employees and borrowed one trillion yen of public funds. Yasuda Trust & Banking, Fuji's affiliated trust company, entered severe financial difficulties in 1999 and sought an additional capital injection from Fuji. Fuji was still experiencing its own difficulties and could not afford to rescue Yasuda. However, Fuji and DKB were able to negotiate a three-party transaction in which Fuji and DKB merged their respective trust banks, and the merged company acquired the corporate and pension divisions of Yasuda Trust & Banking.

=== Merger ===
On September 29, 2000, all shares of Fuji, DKB and the Industrial Bank of Japan were acquired by a newly formed Mizuho Holdings. The three banks continued to operate separately pending their final legal merger.

At the time of the September 11 attacks on New York's World Trade Center, Fuji Bank's United States offices were located at the impact zone of United Airlines Flight 175 in 2 World Trade Center (the South Tower) occupying the office space on the 79th through 82nd floors. After the North Tower was hit, the managers rushed to evacuate their employees. Within fifteen minutes, the managers had successfully evacuated 120 employees. However, 23 Fuji Bank employees died in the attack. Fuji Bank employee Stanley Praimnath was one of only eighteen remaining people located at the South Tower's collision zone to survive. DKB's offices were located in the North Tower.

On April 1, 2002, Fuji acquired the corporate banking operations of DKB and absorbed all operations of IBJ, renaming itself Mizuho Corporate Bank. DKB simultaneously acquired the individual banking operations of Fuji and renamed itself Mizuho Bank. Both banks became wholly owned subsidiaries of Mizuho Financial Group. The legal merger of Mizuho Corporate Bank with Mizuho Bank took place on July 1, 2013.

== Gallery ==
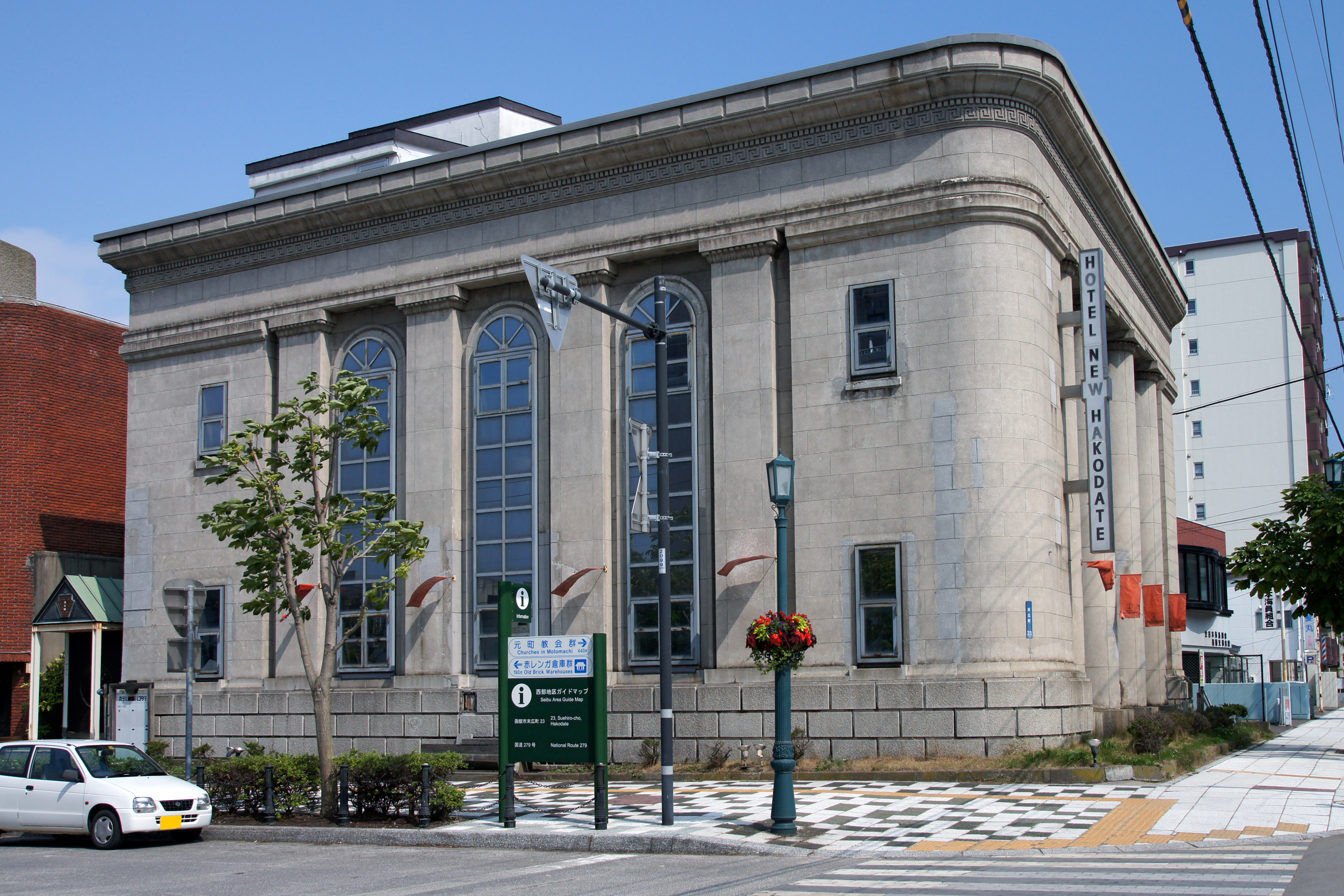
Former branch in Hakodate, Hokkaido

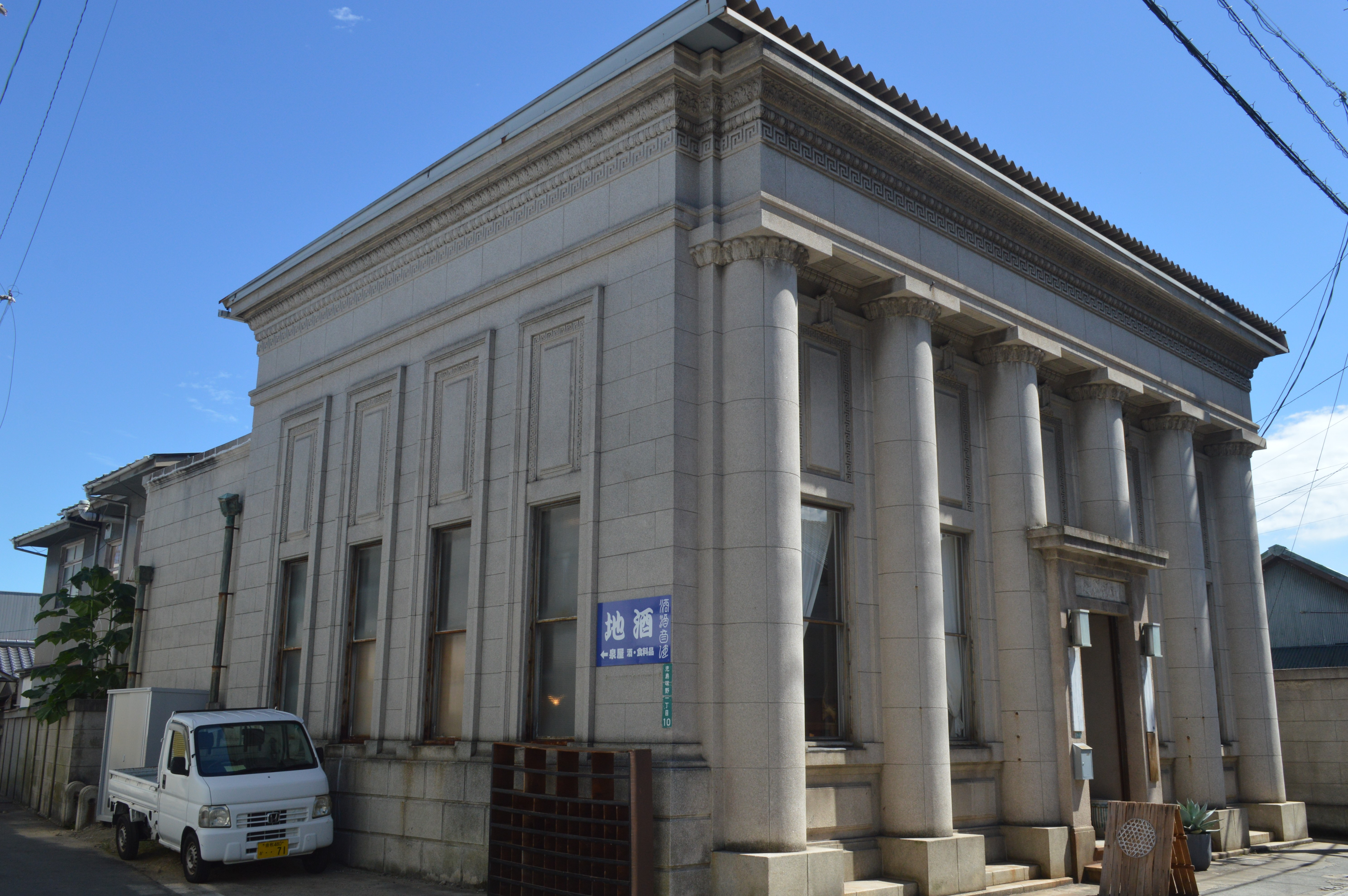
Former branch in Kojima, Kurashiki

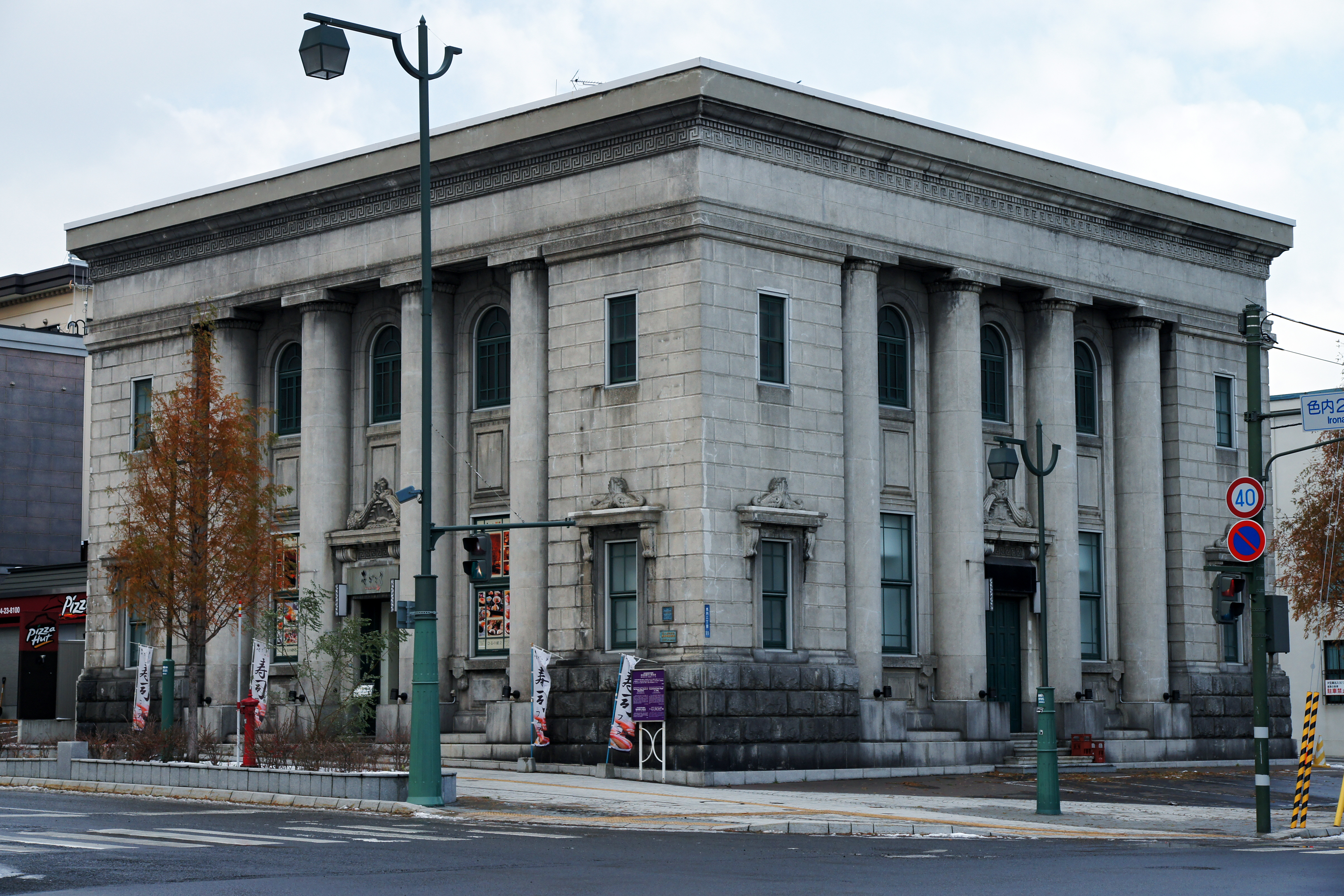
Former branch in Otaru, Hokkaido

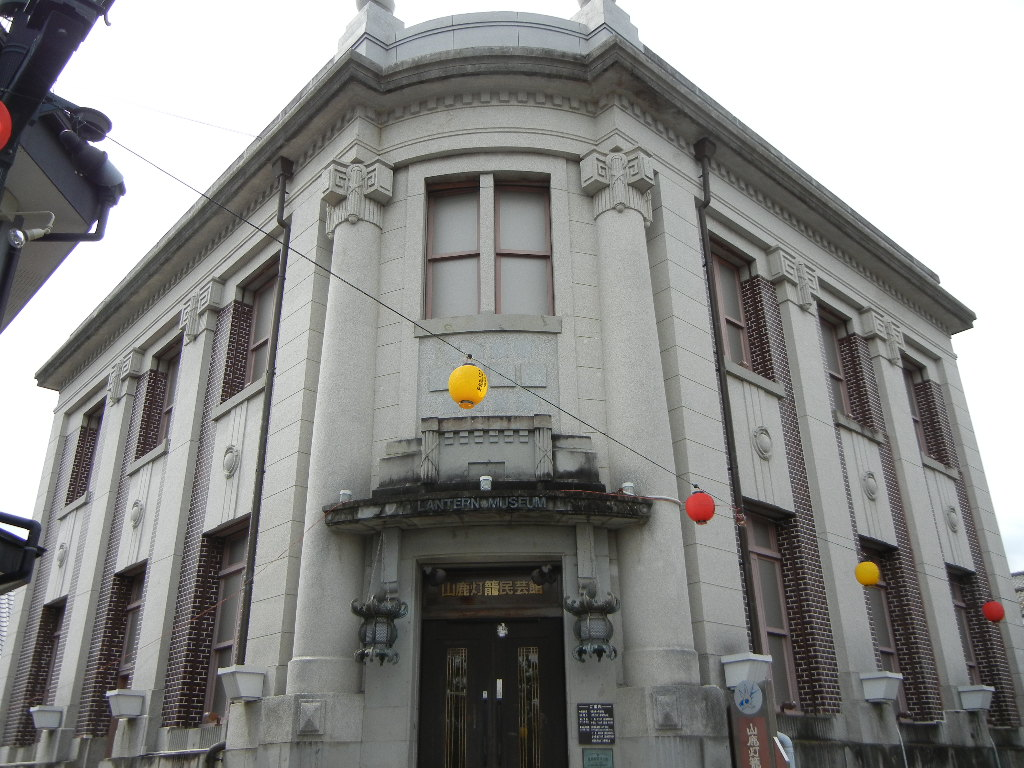
Former branch in Yamaga, Kumamoto, lately the Yamaga Lantern Folk Craft Museum

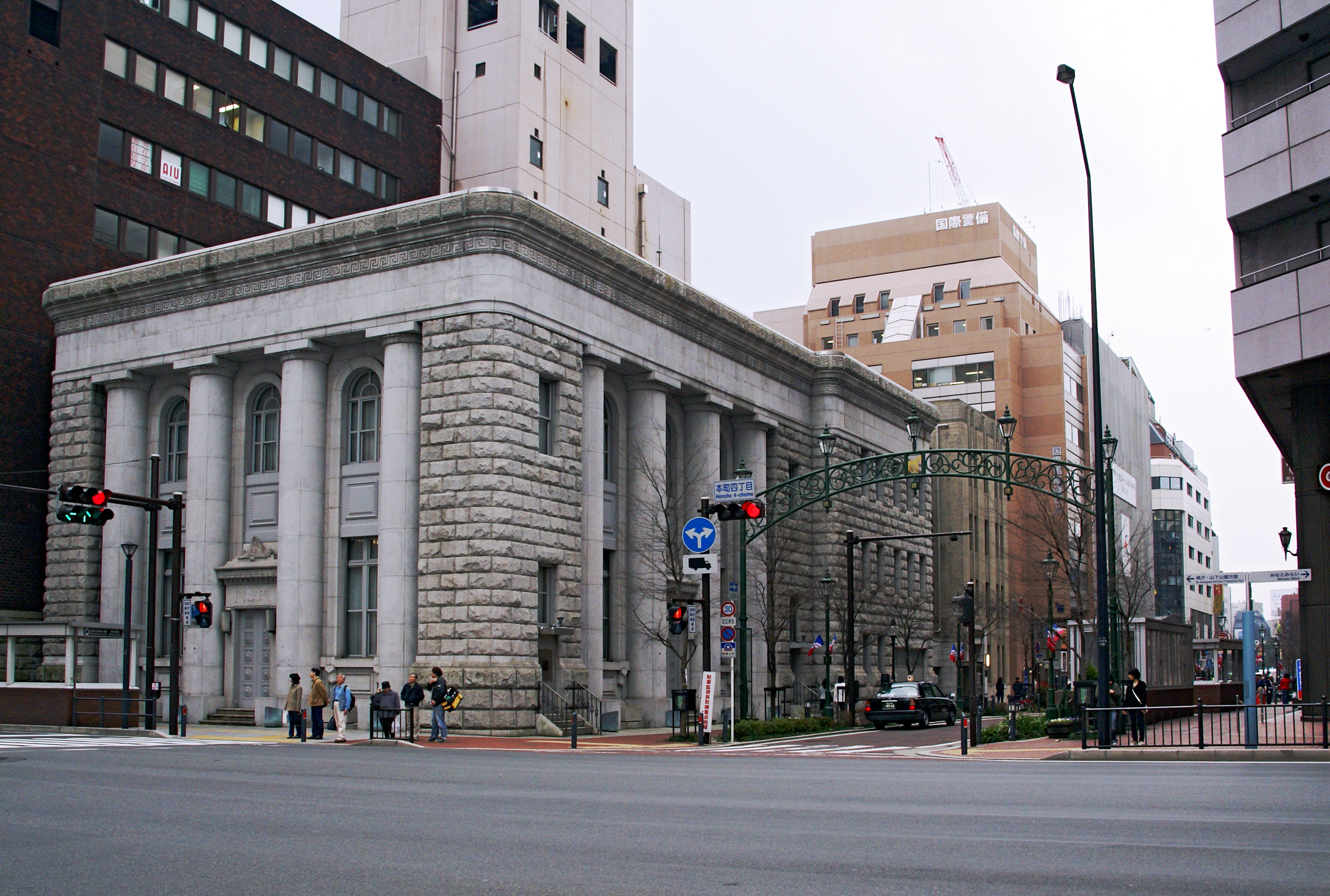
Former branch in Yokohama

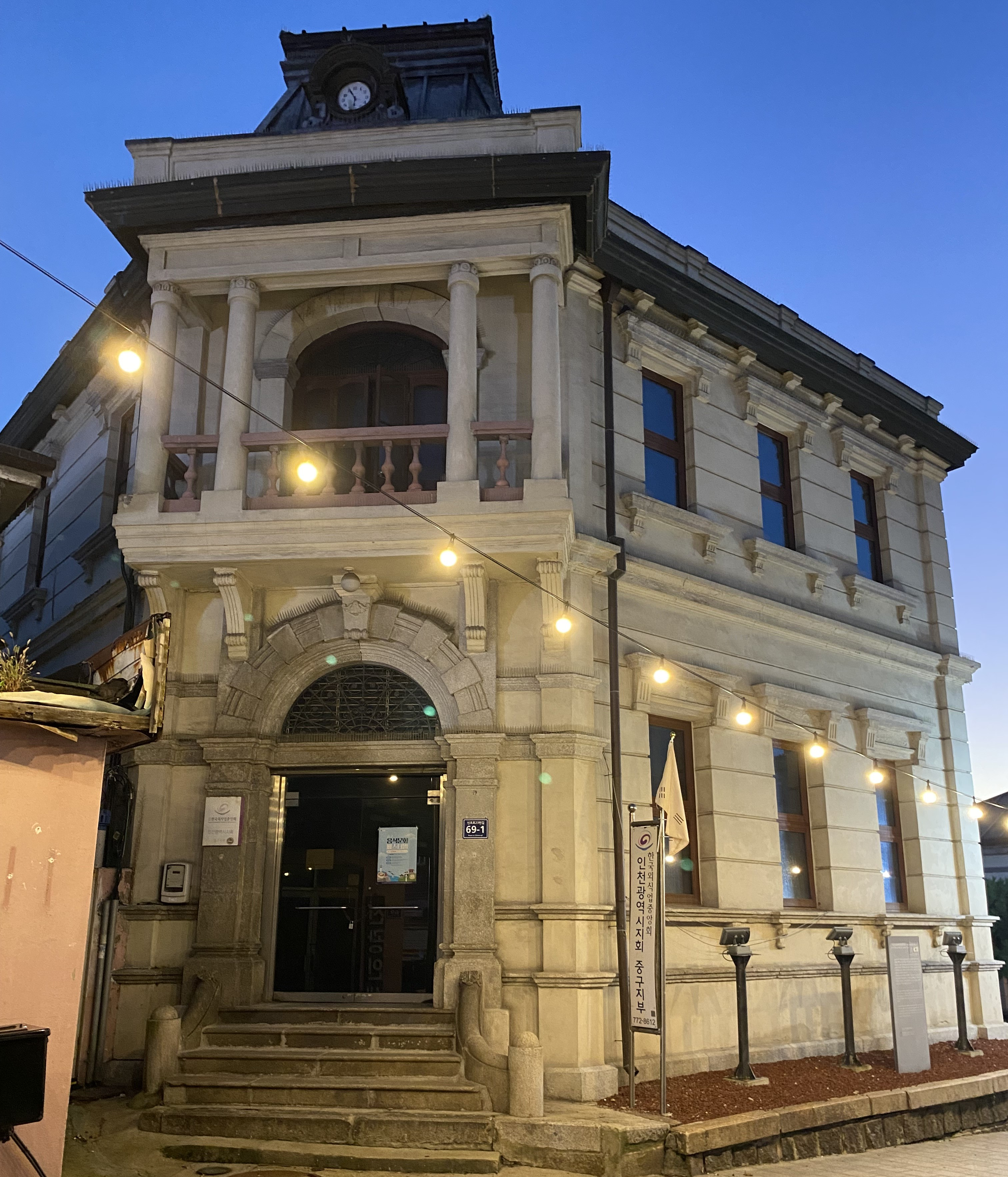
Former branch in Incheon, originally built in 1892 for the 58th Bank
