= Keiretsu =

Type of conglomerate in Japan

A keiretsu (Japanese: 系列) is a set of companies with interlocking business relationships and shareholdings that dominated the Japanese economy in the second half of the 20th century. In the legal sense, it is a type of business group that is in a loosely organized alliance within Japan's business community. It rose up to replace the zaibatsu system that was dissolved in the occupation of Japan following the Second World War. Though their influence has shrunk since the late 20th century, they continue to be important forces in Japan's economy in the early 21st century.

The members' companies own small portions of the shares in each other's companies, centered on a core bank; this system helps insulate each company from stock market fluctuations and takeover attempts, thus enabling long-term planning in projects.

== Origins ==
The prototypical keiretsu appeared during the Japanese economic miracle which followed World War II, amid the dissolution of family-controlled vertical monopolies called zaibatsu.

The zaibatsu had been at the heart of economic and industrial activity within the Empire of Japan since Japanese industrialization accelerated during the Meiji era. They held great influence over Japanese national and foreign policies which only increased following the Japanese victories in the Russo-Japanese War of 1904–1905 and World War I. During the inter-war period the zaibatsu aided Japanese militarism and benefited from their conquest of East Asia by receiving lucrative contracts.

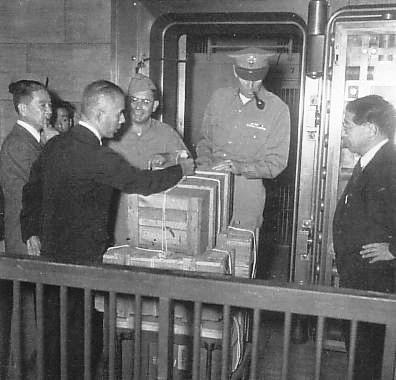
Seizure of the zaibatsu families' assets, 1946

After the surrender of Japan the Allied occupation forces partially attempted to dissolve the zaibatsu which had worked closely with the militarists during the first half of the 20th century and during the war. However, the United States government later rescinded those orders in an effort to reindustrialize Japan as a bulwark against communism in Asia, so the zaibatsu were never completely dissolved.

== Types ==
The two types of keiretsu, horizontal and vertical, can be further categorized as:

- Kigyō shūdan (企業集団, "horizontally diversified business groups")
- Seisan keiretsu (生産系列, "vertical manufacturing networks")
- Ryūtsū keiretsu (流通系列, "vertical distribution networks")

=== Horizontal keiretsu ===
The primary aspect of a horizontal keiretsu (also known as financial keiretsu) is that it is set up around a Japanese bank through cross-shareholding relationships with other companies. The bank assists these companies with a range of financial services. The leading horizontal Japanese keiretsu, also referred to as the "Big Six", include: Fuyo, Sanwa, Sumitomo, Mitsubishi, Mitsui, and DKB Group. Horizontal keiretsu may also have vertical relationships, called branches.

Horizontal keiretsu peaked around 1988, when over half of the value in the Japanese stock market consisted of cross-shareholdings. Since then, banks have gradually reduced their cross-shareholdings. The Japanese corporate governance code, effective from June 2015, requires listed companies to disclose a rationale for their cross-shareholdings. Partly as a result of this requirement, the four Japanese "megabanks" descended from the six major keiretsu banks (namely Mitsubishi UFJ Financial Group, Sumitomo Mitsui Financial Group, Sumitomo Mitsui Trust Group and Mizuho Financial Group) have indicated plans to further reduce their balance of cross-shareholding investments.

Membership in horizontal keiretsu is often loose and often not something considered in day-to-day decision making by its members.

=== Vertical keiretsu ===
Vertical keiretsu (also known as industrial or distribution keiretsu) are used to link suppliers, manufacturers, and distributors of one industry. Banks have less influence on vertical keiretsu. Examples of this type include Toyota, Toshiba, and Nissan. One or more sub-companies, arranged in tiers of importance, are created to benefit the parent company. Major suppliers form the second tier beneath the parent, and smaller manufacturing companies make up the third and fourth tiers. Those at the highest levels are most profitable, and most insulated from fluctuations in the market.

Some vertical keiretsu may belong to one or another horizontal keiretsu. Some vertical keiretsu are family businesses, such as the Hitotsubashi/Shogakukan, Otowa/Kodansha and APA groups. Studies have found these vertical keiretsus, particularly those that belong to the same horizontal keiretsu, are more likely to form alliances than the other types or even those companies where one or two have keiretsu affiliations. Vertical keiretsu is considered an effective and competitive organizational model in the car industry.

== History ==
During the occupation of Japan, under the Supreme Commander for the Allied Powers, General Douglas MacArthur, a partially successful attempt was made to dissolve the zaibatsu in the late 1940s. Sixteen zaibatsu were targeted for complete dissolution, and 26 more for reorganization after dissolution. However, the companies formed from the dismantling of the zaibatsu were later reintegrated. The dispersed corporations were reinterlinked through share purchases to form horizontally integrated alliances across many industries. Where possible, keiretsu companies would also supply one another, making the alliances vertically integrated, as well. In this period, official government policy promoted the creation of robust trade corporations that could withstand heavy pressures from intensified trade competition.

The major keiretsu were each centered on one bank, which lent money to the keiretsu member companies and held equity positions in the companies. Each bank had great control over the companies in the keiretsu and acted as a monitoring and emergency bail-out entity. One effect of this structure was to minimize the presence of hostile takeovers in Japan, because no entities could challenge the power of the banks. Although the divisions between them have blurred in recent years, there have been eight major postwar keiretsu.

Toyota is considered the biggest of the vertically integrated keiretsu groups, although the company is rather considered as a "emerged" keiretsu, along with Softbank and Seven & I Holdings Co. The banks at the top are not as large as normally required, so it is actually considered to be more horizontally integrated than other keiretsu.

The Japanese recession in the 1990s had profound effects on the keiretsu. Many of the largest banks were hit hard by bad loan portfolios and forced to merge or go out of business. This blurred the lines between the individual keiretsu: Sumitomo Bank and Mitsui Bank, for instance, became Sumitomo Mitsui Banking Corporation in 2001, while Sanwa Bank (the banker for the Hankyu-Toho Group) became part of Bank of Tokyo-Mitsubishi UFJ.

Generally, these causes gave rise to a strong notion in the Japanese business community that the old keiretsu system was not an effective business model, and led to an overall loosening of keiretsu alliances. While they still exist, they are not as centralized or integrated as they were before the 2000s. For instance, many troubled Japanese companies are faced with a new reality in which receiving financial support from their main banks is getting harder and unlikelier than ever before. The companies include Sharp Corporation and Toshiba, both iconic Japanese corporations that were forced to accept foreign investment in the aftermath of financial difficulties in the 2010s.

This changed environment, in turn, has led to a growing corporate acquisition industry in Japan, as companies are no longer able to be easily "bailed out" by their banks, as well as rising derivative litigation by more independent shareholders.

=== United States–Japan bilateral relationship ===
By April 2015, U.S. Trade Representative Michael Froman and Japanese Economy Minister Akira Amari, representing the two largest economies of the 12-nation Trans-Pacific Partnership, were involved in bilateral talks regarding agriculture and auto parts, the "two largest obstacles for Japan". These bilateral accords would open each other's markets for products such as rice, pork and automobiles.

During the two-day ministerial TPP negotiating session held in Singapore in May 2015, veteran US negotiator Wendy Cutler and Oe Hiroshi of the Japanese Ministry of Foreign Affairs held bilateral trade talks regarding one of the most contentious trade issues, automobiles. American negotiators wanted the Japanese to open their entire keiretsu structure, a cornerstone of the Japanese economy, to American automobiles. They wanted Japanese dealer networks such as Toyota, Nissan, Honda, Mitsubishi, and Mazda to sell American cars. The successful conclusion of these bilateral talks was necessary before the other ten TPP members could complete the trade deal.

=== Outside Japan ===
The keiretsu model is fairly unique to Japan. However, many diversified non-Japanese businesses groups have been described as keiretsu, such as the Virgin Group (UK), Tata Group (India), the Colombian Grupo Empresarial Antioqueño and the Venezuelan Grupo Cisneros.

The automotive and banking industries have created broad cross-ownership networks across nations, but the national companies are normally independently managed. Banks cited as being central to keiretsu-like systems include Deutsche Bank and some keiretsu-like systems, generally referred to as trusts, were created by investment banks in the United States such as JP Morgan and Mellon Financial/Mellon family beginning in the late 19th century (roughly the same period they were created in Japan), but they were largely curtailed through anti-trust legislation championed by Theodore Roosevelt in the early part of the 20th century. A form of keiretsu can also be found in the cross-shareholdings of the large media companies throughout most developed nations. These are largely designed to link content producers to particular distribution channels, and larger content projects, such as expensive movies, are often incorporated with ownership spread across a number of larger companies.

== Contrarian view ==
Harvard Law School professor J. Mark Ramseyer and University of Tokyo professor Yoshiro Miwa have argued that the postwar keiretsu are a "fable" created by Marxist thinkers who occupied prominent positions in academia and media in the early 1960s, to bolster their ideological stance that monopoly capital dominated the Japanese economy.

Contrary to the prevailing view, Miwa and Ramseyer point to the sparsity and tenuousness of cross-shareholding relationships within the keiretsu, the inconsistency in members' relationships with the "main banks" of each keiretsu, and the lack of power and reach of the zaibatsu alumni "lunch clubs" which are often argued to form a core of keiretsu governance. This contrarian view has been disputed.

== See also ==
- Zaibatsu
  - Chaebol, family-owned conglomerates similar to zaibatsu
- Four big families of Hong Kong
- Oligopoly
