= Mizuho Bank =

Japanese bank

Mizuho Bank, Ltd.

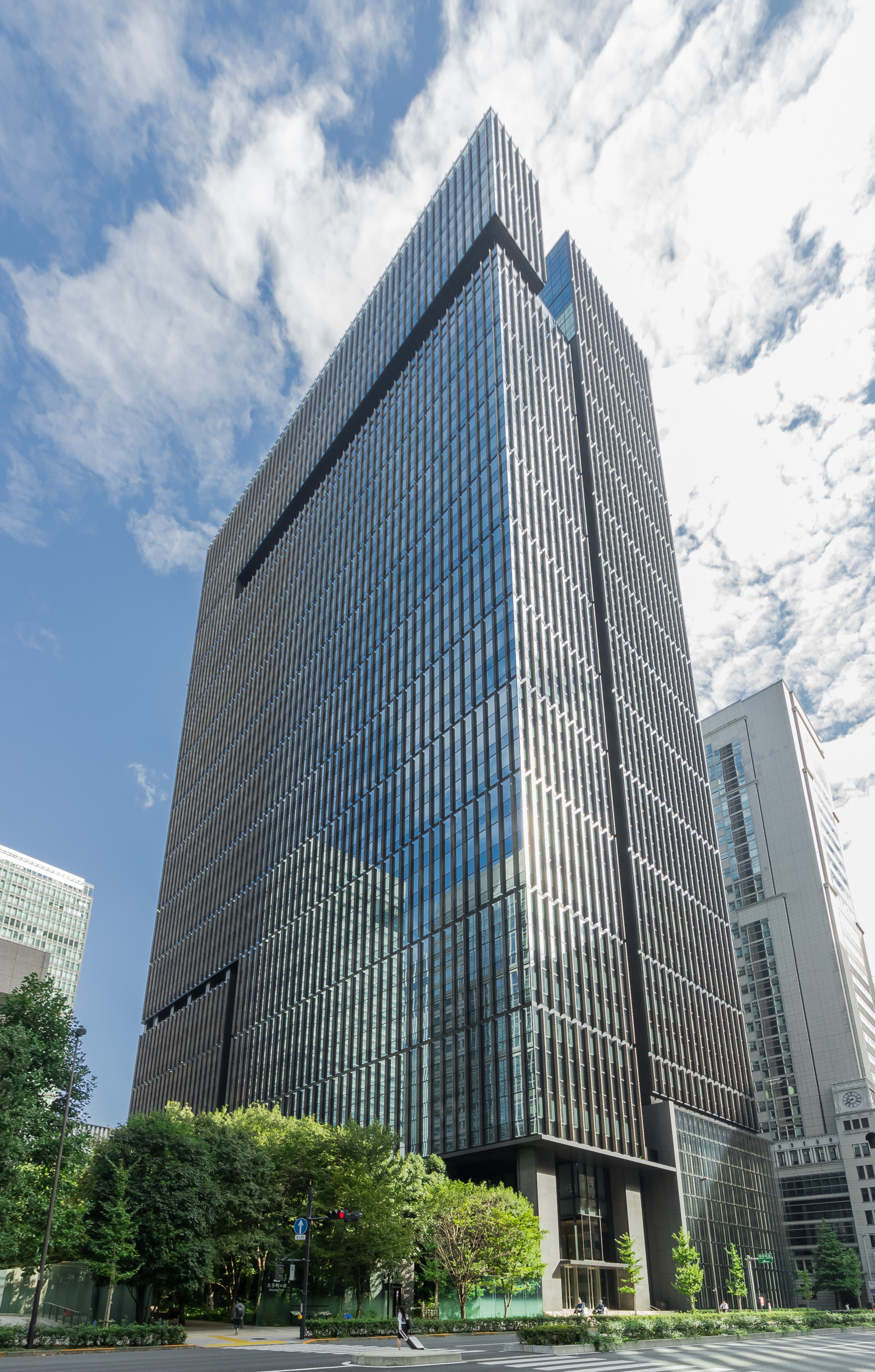
- Otemachi Tower, the headquarter building of Mizuho Financial Group
- Native name: 株式会社 みずほ銀行
- Romanized name: Kabushiki gaisha Mizuho Ginkō
- Industry: Financial services
- Predecessor: The Dai-Ichi Kangyo Bank; The Fuji Bank; The Industrial Bank of Japan
- Founded: May 7, 1923; 103 years ago
- Headquarters: Otemachi, Tokyo, Japan
- Key people: Masahiko Kato (president & CEO)
- Revenue: ▲¥2'672'200 million (2023) (Group total)
- Net income: ▲¥678'900 million (2023) (Group total)
- Number of employees: 30,301 (2018)
- Parent: Mizuho Financial Group
- Website: Mizuho Bank

Mizuho Bank, Ltd. (株式会社みずほ銀行, Kabushiki-gaisha Mizuho Ginkō) is the integrated retail and corporate banking unit of Mizuho Financial Group. It is one of the largest financial services company in Japan with total assets of approximately $1.9 trillion USD in 2023, and considered one of Japan's three so-called megabank groups, along with MUFG and SMBC.

Mizuho Bank provides financial products and services to a wide range of clients, including individuals, small and medium-sized enterprises, large corporations, financial institutions and public sector entities. The bank client base extends to 90% of Forbes Global 200 companies, and over 80% of the listed companies in Japan. Its headquarters is located in Otemachi, the prominent business district of Tokyo. With over 505 branches and offices in Japan, it is the only bank to have branches in every prefecture in Japan. The bank also operates from 110 offices in 40 countries.

The name "Mizuho" is an archaic Japanese term meaning "golden ears of rice," deriving from the classical text Nihon Shoki to describe Japan.

== History ==
Mizuho bank was established in a merger between three major Japanese banks, Industrial Bank of Japan, Dai-Ichi Kangyo Bank and Fuji Bank in 2002. Dai-ichi Kangyo Bank was the successor organisation to Dai-Ichi Bank, the first Japanese bank established in 1873 by Shibusawa Eiichi, allowing Mizuho Bank to inherit the "0001" bank code in Japan. The 2002 merger resulted in Mizuho bank becoming the first bank in the world with $1 trillion in total assets, paving the way for other Japanese banks to merge into "megabank" groups, which supported global competitiveness of the Japanese financial industry in early 21st century. In 2013, it merged with Mizuho Corporate Bank, the group bank previously focused on corporate financing businesses.

In 2025, Mizuho Bank announced its plans to acquire a majority stake in Upsider Holdings, a Japan-based financial services provider focusing on startups, middle-market firms and challenger companies. Mizuho will buy approximately 70% of Upsider's shares for approximately $310 million.

== Services ==
Mizuho services include current accounts, domestic and international cash cards, international money transfers, credit cards, saving accounts, loans, and Internet banking.

Mizuho is the designated bank for the Japanese lottery.

== See also ==
- List of banks in Japan
