= Industrial Bank of Japan =

Former Japanese bank

Industrial Bank of Japan, Limited

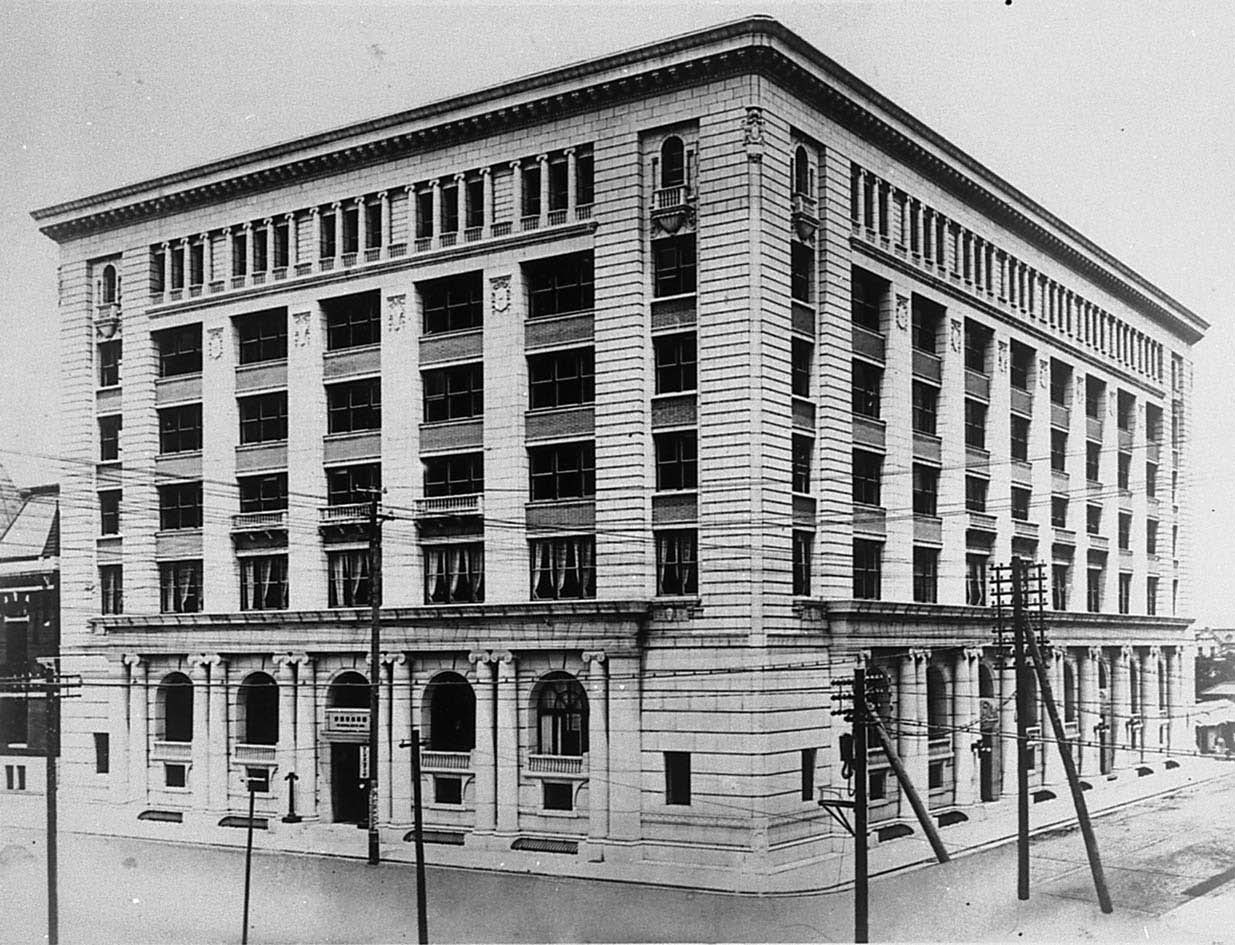
- Former head office in Tokyo, erected in 1923
- Company type: Private
- Industry: Financial services
- Founded: 1902; 123 years ago
- Successor: Merged into Mizuho Financial Group (2001)
- Headquarters: 1-3-3 Marunouchi
- Key people: Masao Nishimura
- Products: Financial Services
- Website: Official website

Industrial Bank of Japan, Limited (IBJ), based in Tokyo, Japan, was one of the largest banks in the world during the latter half of the 20th century. It was established in 1902 as a policy institution or "special bank", similarly as Nippon Kangyo Bank (est. 1897), Bank of Taiwan (est. 1897) and Hokkaido Takushoku Bank (est. 1900), with the aim to finance strategic industrial sectors.

In 1989, it was the most valuable company in the world. In 2002, IBJ combined with Dai-Ichi Kangyo Bank and Fuji Bank to form Mizuho Financial Group.

== History ==
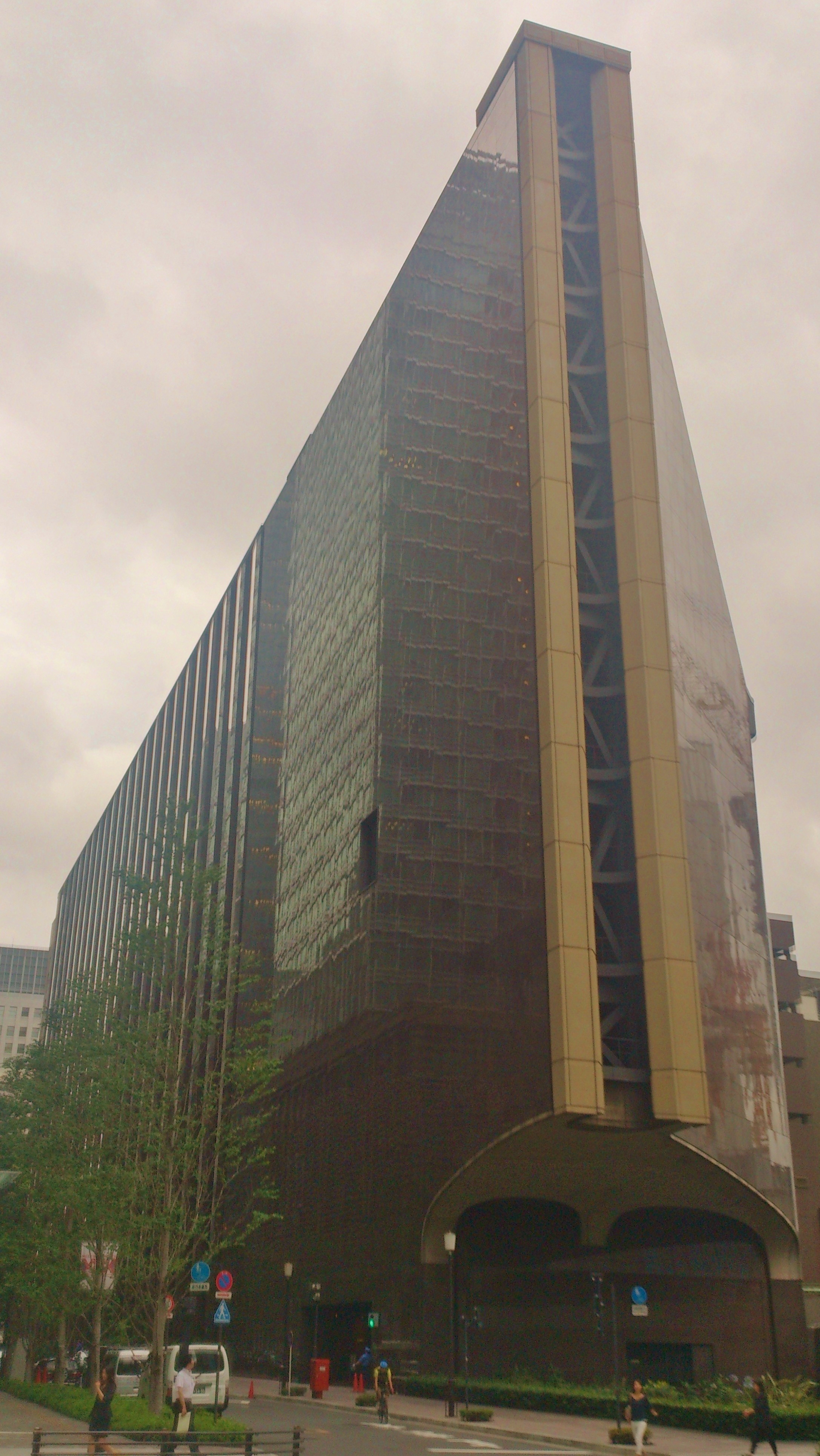
Later IBJ head office building in Tokyo, photographed before demolition

The IBJ was founded as a public-sector bank under the Industrial Bank of Japan Act of 1902, following a period of planning that had been initiated in 1898 by statesman Kaneko Kentarō. The concept was that the bank would issue bonds on Western capital markets and use the proceeds to provide long-term industrial financing, with backing from the Japanese government.

IBJ also acted as the trustee in corporate debenture issues - notably, the major Japanese railway company issue of 1906 in London, amount to the then-enormous sum of 1 million pounds sterling. These activities contributed to the building of the Japanese domestic securities market, and to the generating of a higher profile for Japanese borrowers in the international market.

This early experience of a sophisticated mix of corporate and investment banking with exposure to trust work is unique to IBJ amongst Japanese banks. In the original Act, there was the wording, “Trust business related to local government bond, corporate bonds, and equities”. This was the first time for the term “trust”, or “shintaku” (信託), to appear in the Japanese statute book.

The 1918 amendment to the IBJ Act permitted the underwriting and offering of equities. At that point, IBJ had the full capabilities for what is now termed investment banking. However, that was at what proved to be the peak of the demand created for Japanese products by the First World War and the consequent economic boom.

Thereafter, the next 30 years of Japanese history encompassed many adversities for society in general and for financial institutions in particular: the Great Kantō earthquake, the Showa Financial Panic, and finally, the Second World War and the postwar recovery.

The IBJ, like the Nippon Kangyo Bank, lost its earlier status as semi-public bank by being privatized in 1950, following a recommendation from Supreme Commander of the Allied Powers General Douglas MacArthur. It took new legal form under the Long-Term Bank Act of 1952. However, the Act was framed within the terms of the US-led Occupation policy of compartmentalizing financial services. IBJ was forced to retreat from much of its former investment banking activities and return principally to long-term lending funding by issuing bank debentures.

During the high-growth period of the Japanese economy in the 1960s, IBJ was particularly active in financing steel production, shipping, shipbuilding, and automobile manufacturing. Following the first oil crisis, Japan moved to a pattern of lower growth as a mature economy, and IBJ expanded its customer base at home, and started the process of expansion overseas.

In Japan, the wholesaling of bank debentures to major financial institutions and the regional banks led to a network of strong relationships. This was all supported by the fact that, originally a public-sector bank, IBJ had no keiretsu affiliations: IBJ has always been independent of the large corporate groupings characteristic of Japan and was hence number 2 banker to each and all of the major keiretsu groupings. Internationally, IBJ was free to pursue its investment banking ambitions.

== See also ==
- Mizuho Financial Group
- Mizuho Corporate Bank
- Economy of Japan
