= SMBC Group =

Japanese financial services conglomerate

Sumitomo Mitsui Financial Group, Inc. 株式会社三井住友フィナンシャルグループ
- Logo used since 2018

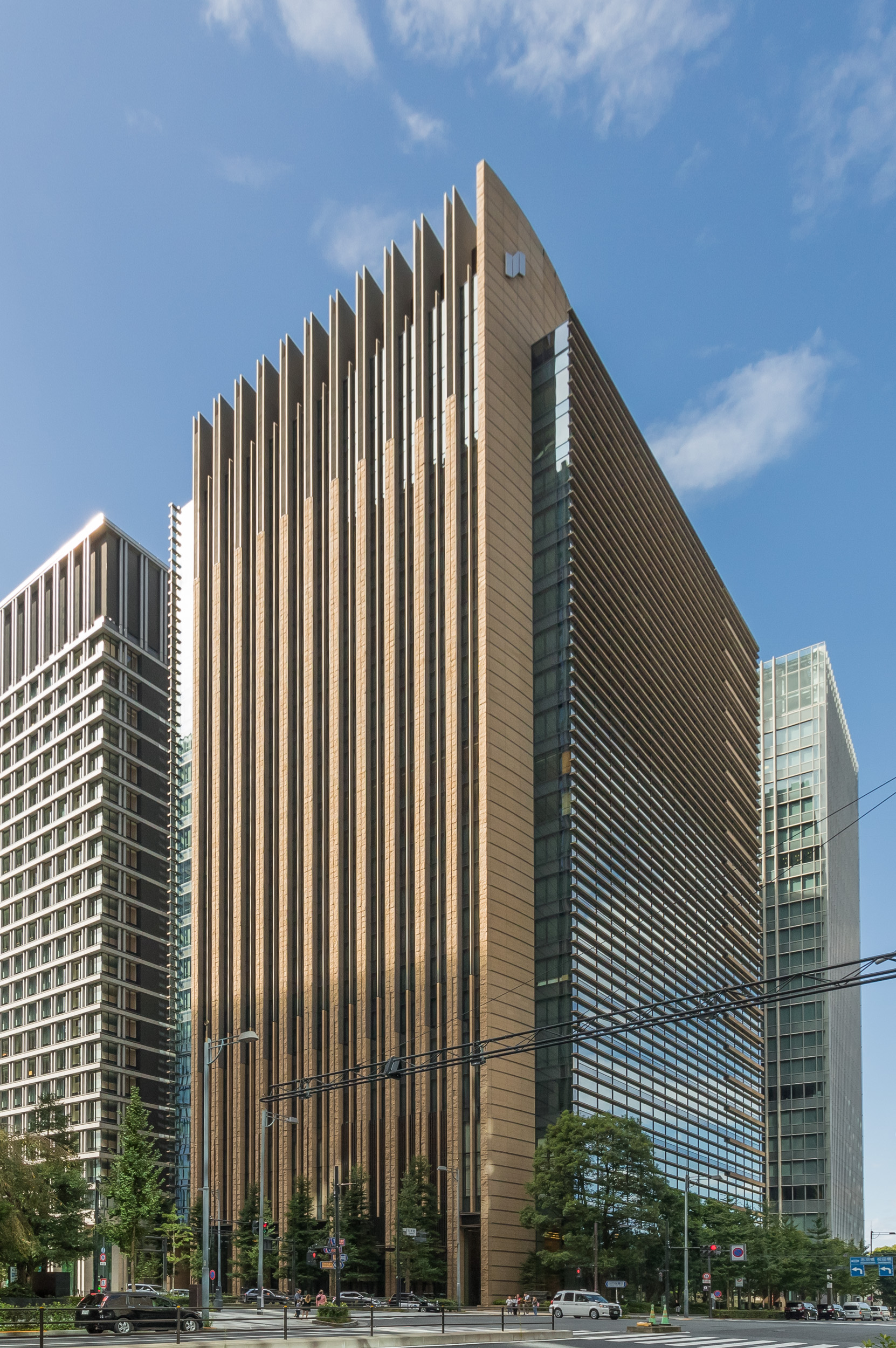
- SMFG's main headquarters in Chiyoda, Tokyo
- Native name: 株式会社三井住友フィナンシャルグループ
- Type: Public
- Traded as: TYO: 8316; NYSE: SMFG; TOPIX Core 30 Component
- Industry: Financial services
- Predecessor: Sumitomo Mitsui Banking Corporation
- Founded: December 2, 2002; 23 years ago
- Headquarters: 1-2, Marunouchi 1-chome, Kanda, Chiyoda, Tokyo, Japan
- Area served: Worldwide
- Key people: Takeshi Kunibe (chairman); Toru Nakashima (CEO)
- Products: Asset management; Banking; Commodities; Credit cards; Equities trading; Insurance; Investment management; Mortgage loans; Private equity; Wealth management
- Revenue: ▲¥9.45 trillion (US$86.11 billion) (FY2026)
- Operating income: ▲¥1.63 trillion (US$14.81 billion) (FY2026)
- Net income: ▲¥1.18 trillion (US$10.75 billion) (FY2026)
- Total assets: ▲¥328.51 trillion (US$2.99 trillion) (FY2026)
- Total equity: ▲¥15.93 trillion (US$145.18 billion) (FY2026)
- Number of employees: 112,800 (2026)
- Subsidiaries: Sumitomo Mitsui Banking Corporation; SMBC Nikko Securities; Sumitomo Mitsui Card; SMBC Consumer Finance
- Website: www.smfg.co.jp

Sumitomo Mitsui Financial Group, Inc. (株式会社三井住友フィナンシャルグループ), initialed as SMFG until 2018 and SMBC Group since, is a major Japanese multinational financial services group and holding company. It is the parent of Sumitomo Mitsui Banking Corporation (SMBC), SMBC Trust Bank, and SMBC Nikko Securities. SMBC originates from the 2001 merger of Sumitomo Bank with the Sakura Bank, itself a successor to the Mitsui Bank, and the group holding entity was created in December 2002 after which SMBC became its wholly owned subsidiary.

SMBC Group operates in retail, corporate, and investment banking segment worldwide. It provides financial products and services to a wide range of clients, including individuals, small and medium-sized enterprises, large corporations, financial institutions and public sector entities. It operates in over 40 countries and maintains a presence in all International Financial Centres as the 12th biggest bank in the world by total assets. It is one of the largest global financial institutions in project finance space by total loan value. It is headquartered in the Marunouchi neighborhood of Tokyo.

SMBC Group is the second-largest of Japan's three so-called megabanks, with $2 trillion of total assets at end-March 2023, behind Mitsubishi UFJ Financial Group ($2.9 trillion) and just ahead of Mizuho Financial Group ($1.9 trillion). As of 2024, SMBC group was listed as 63rd largest public company in the world according to Forbes Global 2000 ranking. It is considered a systemically important bank by the Financial Stability Board.

== History ==
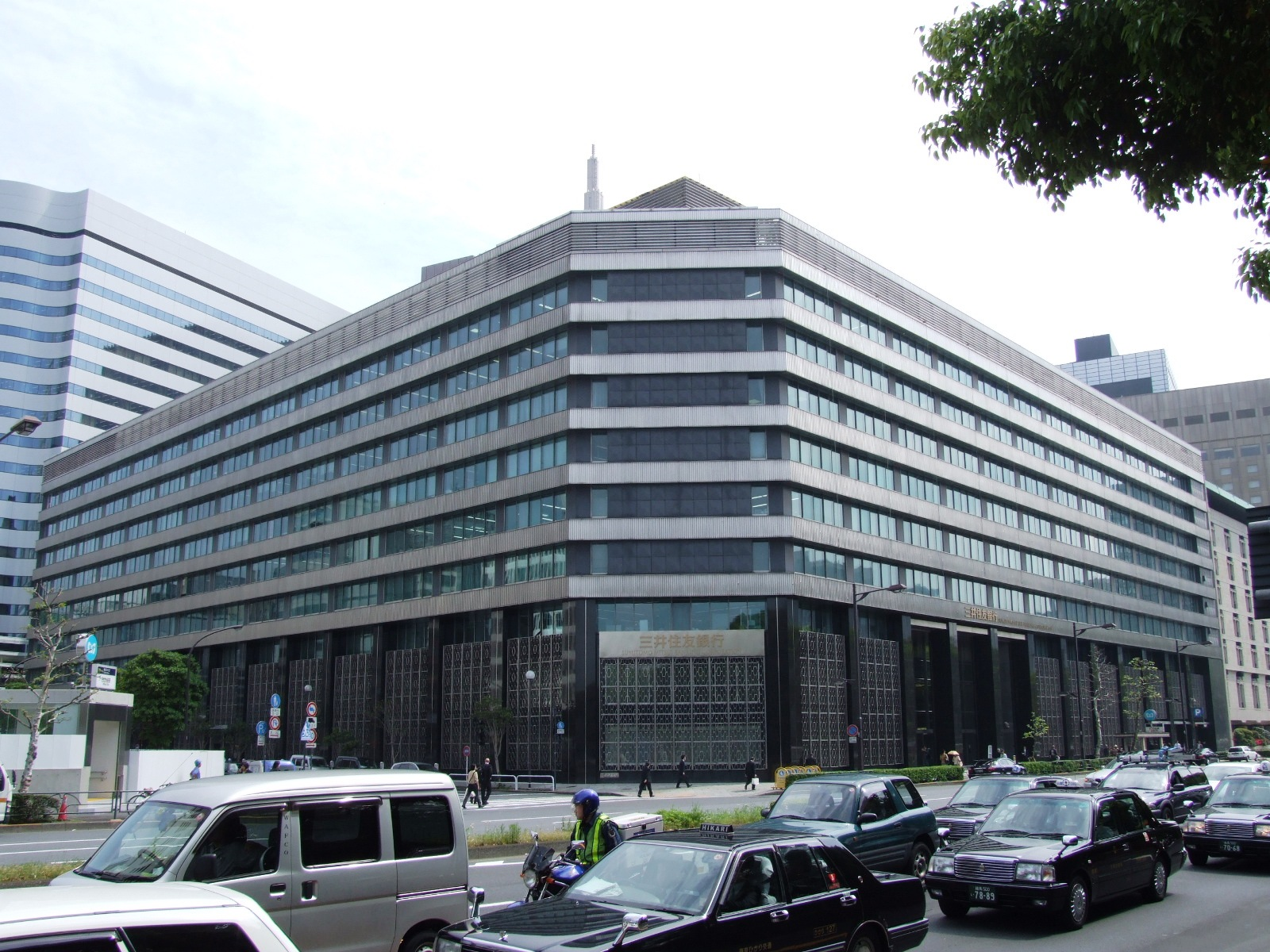
Hibiya Mitsui Building (1960), headquarters of the Sumitomo Mitsui Financial Group from its formation until 2010 (and before that, head office of Mitsui Bank); later demolished and replaced with the Tokyo Midtown Hibiya development

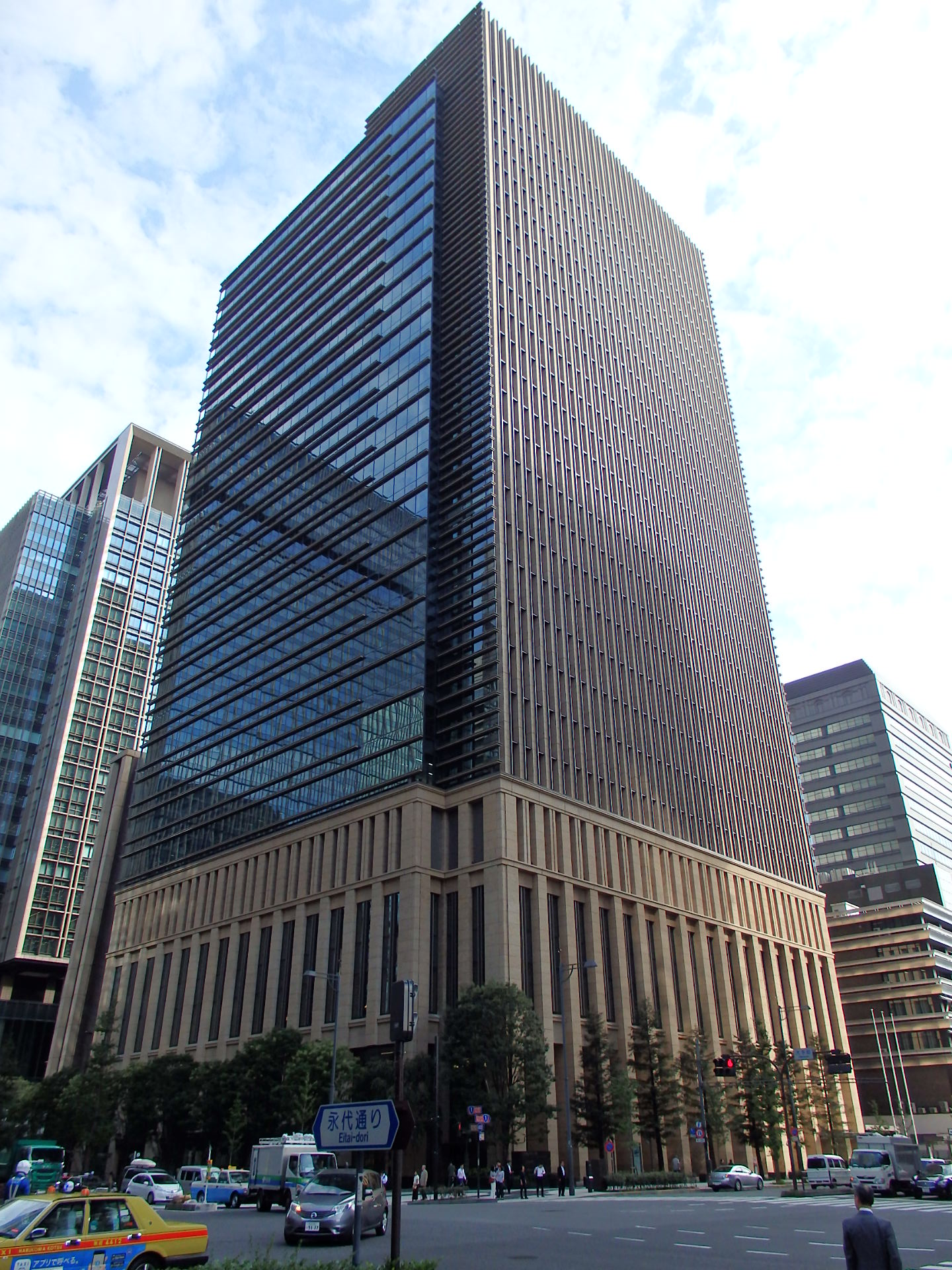
SMBC East Tower, Tokyo, part of the SMBC Group head office complex in Otemachi

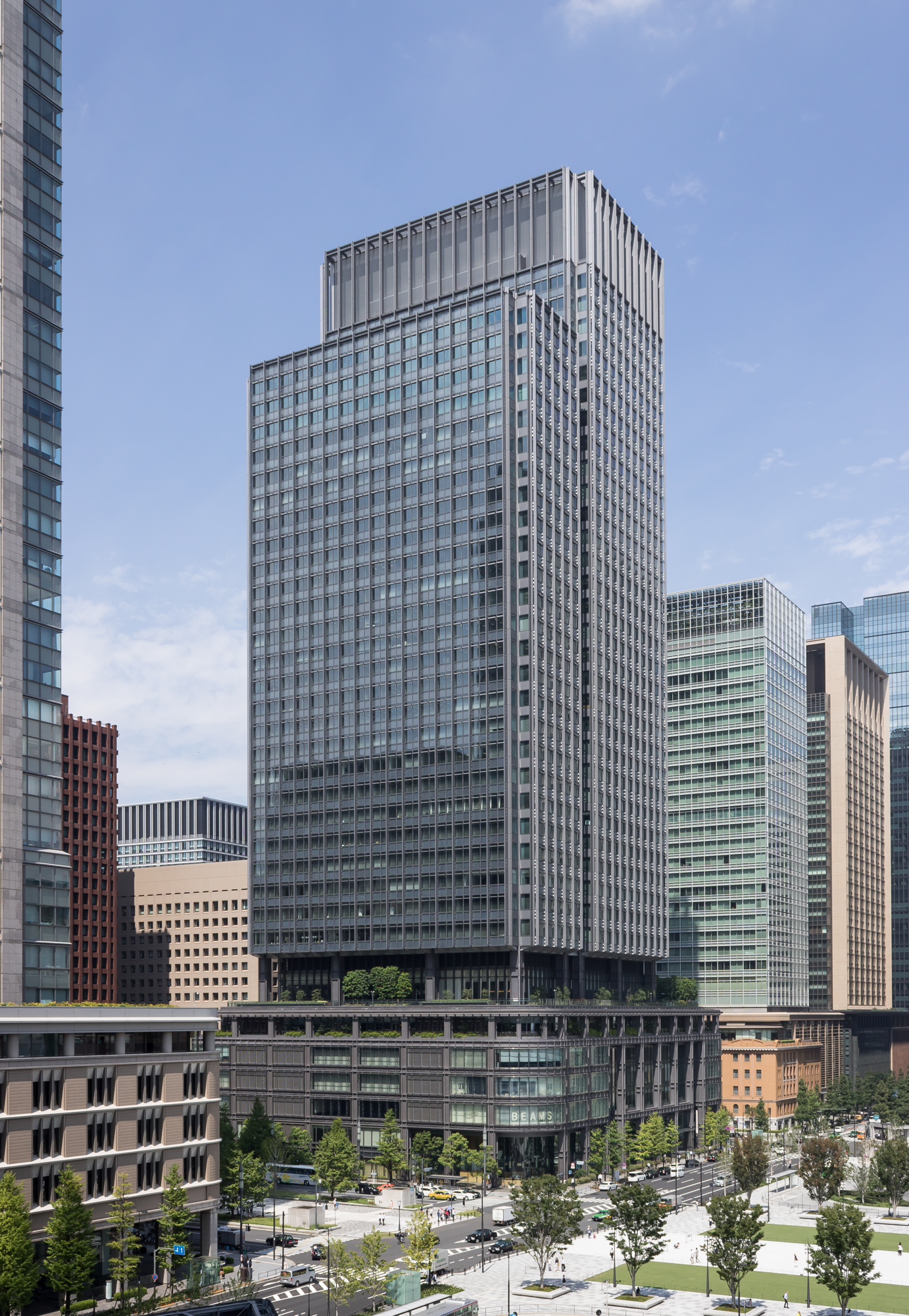
Shin-Marunouchi Building facing Tokyo Station, hosting the head office of SMBC Nikko Securities

SMBC was formed by the merger of the Sumitomo Bank and Sakura Bank in April 2001. Its history could be viewed as going back to 1683, the date of first documented banking operations by Mitsui Takatoshi. The group's two main historical components, Mitsui Bank and Sumitomo Bank, were established as modern private banks in the Meiji era, in 1875 and 1895 respectively. SMBC Group also incorporates several of the National Banks in Meiji Japan which were numbered in accordance with their chronological date of establishment until 1880:

- the 5th National Bank, est. 1875 in Osaka, formed by former Samurai from the Satsuma Domain and merchants from Northern Kyushu, later relocated to Tokyo and merged 1898 into the 32nd Bank (see below);
- the 15th National Bank, est. 1877 in Tokyo, reorganized 1897 as Fifteenth (Jugo) Bank, collapsed 1927 in that year's financial crisis, eventually merged 1944 into Teikoku Bank;
- the 32nd National Bank, est. 1878 in Osaka, merged 1920 into the Fifteenth Bank;
- the 38th National Bank, est. 1878 in Himeji, merged 1936 with several other local banks to form the Bank of Kobe, itself merged 1973 with Taiyo Bank to form Taiyo Kobe Bank;
- the 51st National Bank, est. 1878 in Kishiwada, merged 1940 with several other banks to form Hannan Bank, itself merged 1945 into Sumitomo Bank;
- the 55th National Bank, est. 1878 in Izushi, merged 1928 with Tajima Bank, which itself was absorbed by the Bank of Kobe in 1945;
- the 56th National Bank, est. 1878 in Akashi, later Goroku Bank, another participant in the merger that formed the Bank of Kobe in 1936;
- the 61st National Bank, est. 1878 in Kurume, acquired 1912 by Sumitomo Bank;
- the 65th National Bank, est. 1878 in Tottori, acquired 1928 by Kobe Okazaki Bank (est. 1917) which was another of the banks that formed the Bank of Kobe in 1936;
- the 94th National Bank, est. 1878 in Tatsuno, absorbed 1917 by the 38th Bank;
- the 106th National Bank, est. 1878 in Saga, acquired 1941 by Sumitomo Bank;
- the 131st National Bank, est. 1879 in Kasukabe then relocated to Kano, merged 1881 into the 32nd National Bank;
- the 137th National Bank, est. 1879 in Sasayama, split 1942 into two banks, one of which was absorbed by the Bank of Kobe;
- the 142nd National Bank, est. 1879 in Chōshi, merged 1881 into the 32nd National Bank.

At the time of the merger, the combined entity was of similar size to Deutsche Bank and to the pending merger that would soon form Mizuho Bank.

=== Early years ===
The newly created bank was plagued with bad assets from the Japanese banking crisis. This led to several corporate actions taken by SMBC to clean up its balance sheet and raise capital, including writing off non-performing loans and selling its stake in Goldman Sachs.

SMBC announced on July 30, 2002 that it would establish a holding company by December and reorganize three related companies, its subsidiary Sumitomo Mitsui Card Company, Sumitomo Mitsui Bank Leasing, and The Japan Research Institute, a sister think tank, as subsidiaries of the holding company. The holding company had a capital of 1 trillion yen, and SMBC CEO Takashi Nishikawa and Chairman Akira Okada each served as president and chairman of the holding company.

In July 2002, SMBC announced that it would repay 2,000 billion yen of public funds, which had been accepted in the form of perpetual subordinated bonds. The funds were part of a total of 1.5 trillion yen that had been injected into the Japanese banking system following the financial crisis of the late 1990s. In 2005, SMBC announced a three-year repayment plan, and in October of that year, it repaid an additional 323.6 billion yen. SMFG initially targeted repaying all of its public funds by the end of the 2006 fiscal year. Mitsubishi UFJ Financial Group (MUFG) and Mizuho Financial Group (MHFG) also had the same goal. These moves were due to a number of factors, including the active resolution of non-performing loans, which had stabilized the financial system, and the increased repayment capacity of the banks. The Financial Services Agency had also encouraged banks to repay their funds early, and some banks, which were reluctant to have their management interfered with by the authorities, had responded.

In December 2002, SMBC began considering a takeover of the Aozora Bank, which was established after the collapse of the former The Nippon Credit Bank. The Aozora Bank President Hiroshi Maruyama expressed reservations about the proposal, as it would have made it difficult for the bank to go public and repay public funds from the proceeds of the IPO. SMBC competed with a joint venture between the US investment firm Cerberus and the German bank HypoVereinsbank, and the US financial company GE Capital. The offer price was about 100 billion yen, and Cerberus also offered the same amount. However, Cerberus, as a major shareholder of Aozora Bank with a 12% stake, had the right to purchase the bank first if the offer price was the same as that of the other bidders. In April 2003, Cerberus announced the acquisition of the Aozora Bank.

In March 2003, SMBC initiated a reverse merger with its subsidiary, Wakashio Bank (est. June 1996), to secure financial resources to cover large deferred losses from its equity holdings. Although SMBC was technically dissolved and Wakashio Bank became a company that survived, under the Japanese Commercial Code, the surviving entity took the name Sumitomo Mitsui Banking Corp., just like the disbanded bank name. SMBC President Yoshifumi Nishikawa and chairman Akishige Okada became president and Chairman of the new entity respectively. Hiroyasu Ichikawa, President of Wakashio Bank, assumed the position of senior managing director. The purpose of the merger was to generate about 2 trillion yen in book profits (merger surplus) by making the Wakashio Bank the surviving company, and to eliminate the hidden losses of SMBC, such as those on stocks. The profit, then, was used to accelerate write-offs of the bank's unrealized securities losses and boost sales of its shareholdings to reduce risk from the fluctuation of stock prices. Post the merger, the new entity grew rapidly through organic and inorganic growth strategy. The assets expanded from 102.4 trillion yen in 2003 to more than 200 trillion yen by the end of 2019, making it the 12th largest bank in the world.

On July 14, 2004, UFJ Holdings announced that it had decided to enter into negotiations with Mitsubishi Tokyo Financial Group (MTFG) for a management integration. In response, on July 30, SMFG announced that it had made a management integration proposal to UFJ. On August 8, it was reported that SMFG had sent a formal proposal document summarizing the detailed terms of the integration plan to MTFG. In response to MTFG's plan to provide an investment of approximately 500 billion yen, SMFG said that it would invest at least 500 billion yen and up to 700 billion yen. SMFG proposed a merger ratio of "1 to 1." The recent stock prices of SMFG and UFJ were 1 to 0.77 on average over the past six months, which was an exceptionally favorable condition for UFJ shareholders. However, in February 2005, MTFG and UFJ signed a merger agreement with a merger ratio of "1 to 0.62." SMFG officially decided to withdraw its management integration proposal to UFJ and notified UFJ in writing. On January 1, 2006, MTFG and UFJ Holdings merged to form Mitsubishi UFJ Financial Group. While SMBC eventually lost the contest, it was credited with increasing competition within Japan's once staid banking industry.

In February 2005, it was revealed that SMFG was in negotiations with Daiwa Securities Group, with a view to a possible merger of the two companies. The two groups had already established a joint venture, Daiwa Securities SMBC, a specialist in corporate transactions, but they were considering merging their holding companies to achieve a complete integration of the groups as a whole. They hoped to achieve this as early as the 2005 fiscal year. However, on April 8, Daiwa Securities Group Holdings President Shigeharu Suzuki said, "There are no benefits to a merger at this time, and we have no plans to begin negotiations with Sumitomo Mitsui Financial Group."

In September 2006, SMFG acquired SMBC Friend Securities, which was a majority-owned subsidiary of SMBC with a 40% stake.

SMFG announced on October 17, 2006, that it had repaid all of its public funds. MUFG repaid the funds it had inherited from its predecessor, UFJ Bank, in June. MHFG repaid its public funds in July, which had once approached 3 trillion yen. SMFG had initially targeted repaying its public funds by the end of the fiscal year, but it moved up the repayment schedule out of concern that it would be "half a lap behind" the other megabanks.

In December 2006, SMFG announced that it would consolidate its headquarters functions in the Ōtemachi district of Tokyo. Since the merger in 2001, SMFG had its head office in the former Mitsui Bank building in Hibiya, with some headquarters functions in Marunouchi. The new headquarters is located next to the former Sumitomo Bank building, and the move was completed in October 2010. SMFG President Masayuki Oku said, "By consolidating our headquarters, we can improve efficiency and realize advanced and fast-paced operations."

=== Subsequent development ===
SMFG brand identity used until 2018

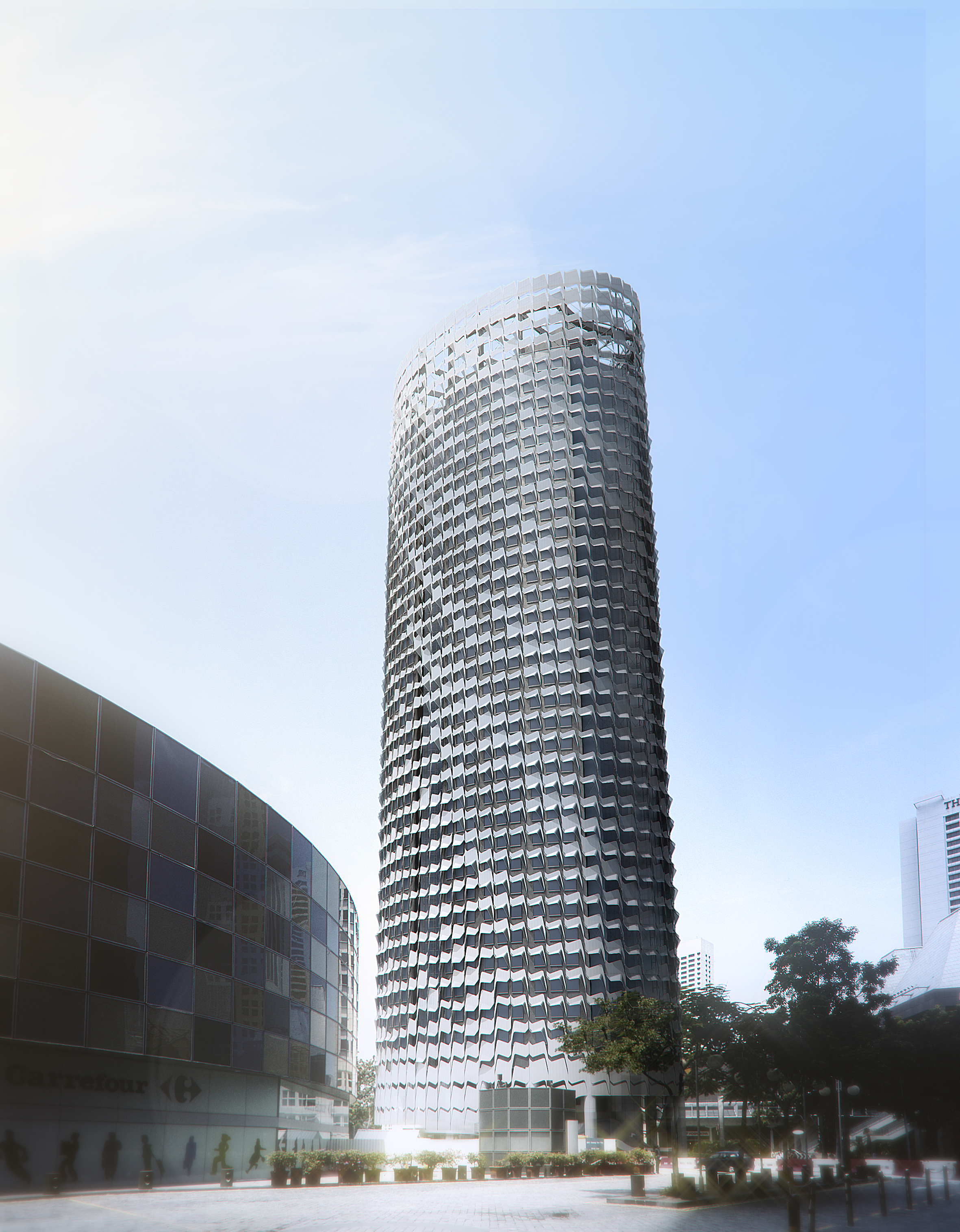
SMBC Asia hub is located in Centennial Tower in Singapore

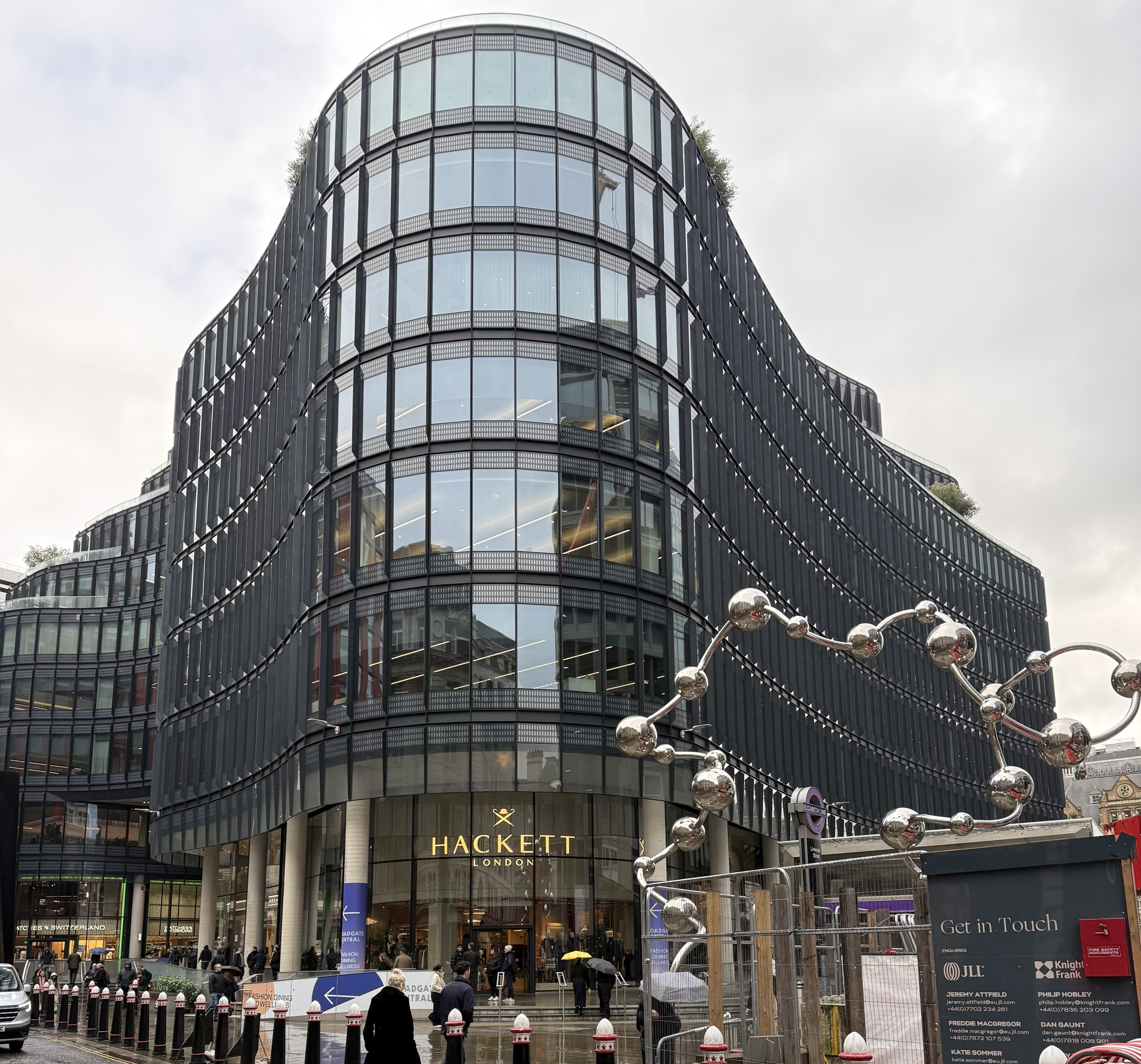
SMBC Bank International building near Liverpool Street station, London

On April 27, 2007, SMFG and Mitsui & Co. announced that they would invest a total of ¥400 billion in Central Finance Co., Ltd, a credit card company affiliated with MUFG Group. SMFG would effectively own 20% of CF, giving it a controlling stake. This move was seen as an effort by SMFG to strengthen its credit card business, which was lagging behind those of other megabanks. The move was initiated by CF last summer, without the knowledge of MUFG. Central Finance had been in talks with SMFG since then. Meanwhile, MUFG had been trying to merge CF with its close credit card company, Jaccs. However, CF President Tatsuo Tsutikawa and other executives opposed MUFG's plan. "It was not an option for us to stay with MUFG," Tsutikawa said. "Our unique characteristics would not have been allowed to flourish." At that time, CF was also considering a merger with Quoq Card, a credit card company in the SMFG.

In July 2007, SMBC acquired a portion of the shares of Daiei's credit card subsidiary, OMC Card, from the struggling retailer for ¥74.8 billion. SMBC then became OMC Card's parent company. With the addition of OMC Card to its existing subsidiaries, Sumitomo Mitsui Card and Central Finance, SMBC's total cardholder base exceeded 40 million, surpassing its rival, Mitsubishi UFJ NICOS (37 million). SMBC President Masayuki Oku said, "We want to build a group that balances the strengths of banks, credit card companies, and retail card companies."

In July 2008, SMBC Group bought a 2.1 percent stake in Barclays Bank for £500m.

Since 2008, the Singapore branch has become SMBC's regional hub in Asia Pacific while global headquarters is still maintained in Tokyo, Japan.

In February 2009, Citigroup, a US financial company in the midst of a restructuring, announced its intention to sell its Japanese subsidiary, Nikko Cordial Securities, a retail brokerage firm. SMFG, along with MUFG and MHFG, expressed its intention to buy the company. In the final round of bidding on April 20, SMFG submitted the highest bid. On May 2, SMFG officially announced the acquisition of Nikko Cordial Securities and the major businesses of Nikko Citigroup Securities for ¥545 billion. In October 2009, SMBC purchased all of the operations of Nikko Cordial Securities and certain businesses of Nikko Citigroup, such as the domestic stock and bond underwriting business among others, before reorganizing them into a new subsidiary company, SMBC Nikko Securities Inc., in April 2011. SMBC Nikko Securities becomes investment banking arm of SMBC group and offers equity and debt financing, trading, and merger and acquisition advisory services worldwide with the main base in Japan.

In April 2009, SMFG began considering a preliminary merger of its corporate brokerage business with Daiwa Securities Group, as part of a comprehensive partnership. The corporate brokerage firm Daiwa Securities SMBC, in which SMFG owns 40% and Daiwa owns 60%, was to be merged with part of Nikko Citigroup Securities, with SMFG increasing its stake in the new entity. On May 12, 2009, Daiwa Securities Group President Shigeharu Suzuki said, "a merger of Daiwa Securities SMBC and the major departments of Nikko Citigroup Securities was natural given the two companies' competition." He also said, "a full-scale merger of Daiwa Securities (a retail brokerage firm) and Nikko Cordial Securities was not in the cards." However, the full-scale negotiations that began in mid-July dragged on longer than expected. SMFG wanted to increase its stake in Daiwa SMBC from 40% to over 50%, but Daiwa was reluctant. On September 10, 2009, SMFG and Daiwa Securities Group announced that they would dissolve the joint venture for Daiwa Securities SMBC. Daiwa would buy all of the SMFG-owned shares, which represented 40% of the total, for ¥173.9 billion. Daiwa Securities SMBC would be renamed Daiwa Securities Capital Markets and become a wholly owned subsidiary of Daiwa.

The bank steadily increased its tier 1 capital ratios from 12.19% in 2014 to 16.69% as reported in March 2018. Standard & Poor's, Moody's and Fitch Ratings assigned SMBC's an A1, A and A rating respectively (as at March 2018).

In March 2015, SMBC Group bought HK$6.58 billion (JP¥105 billion, US$849 million) of new Bank of East Asia shares, raising SMBC's stake in the Hong Kong lender to 17.5% from 9.7%. In January 2019, SMBC Indonesia merged with PT Bank Tabungan Pensiunan Nasional Tbk, also known as Bank BTPN. The group owned 96.89% ownership of the bank since the merger was completed on 1 February 2019, with Bank BTPN as the surviving brand. Indonesian authorities approved the merger in December 2018, while Japanese authorities approved the merger a month later.

In April 2016, Sumitomo Mitsui Finance and Leasing completed the acquisition of General Electric Group's Japan-based leasing business.

In January 2019, Sumitomo Mitsui Banking Corporation (SMBC) raised its stake in PT Bank Tabungan Pensiunan Negara Tbk (BTPN) to 96.9 percent, increasing its position from its previous 39.92% stake at IDR4,282 per share. Bank BTPN focuses on serving the mass market segment consisting of pensioners, micro, small and medium enterprises (MSMEs), productive poor communities; consuming class segment; and the corporate segment in Indonesia. Post acquisition, the entity was merged with SMBC's subsidiary in Indonesia. In a summary of the proposed merger of BTPN and Bank Sumitomo Indonesia, the total assets and total equity of the merged bank reached a total IDR 178 trillion and IDR 26.92 trillion respectively, using financial position as of 31 May 2018. Upon the merger, BTPN became the 8th largest bank in Indonesia by total assets. In August 2024, BTPN changed its name to PT Bank SMBC Indonesia Tbk.

In March 2020, SMBC Group agreed to buy a 4.9 percent stake in Ares Management. As part of this agreement, the group will make a US$384 million equity investment into the firm.

In April 2023, SMBC announced a plan to triple its stake in US investment bank Jefferies Financial Group bringing total ownership to as much as 15%. It was part of a broader collaboration between the two companies that would allow SMBC to take on larger rivals while advising and lending to investment-grade companies globally, in addition to working in leveraged finance and mergers and acquisitions.

In August 2024, it was reported that SMBC Group was in the race with Emirates NBD to acquire a majority stake in Yes Bank.

== Group structure ==
=== Business divisions ===
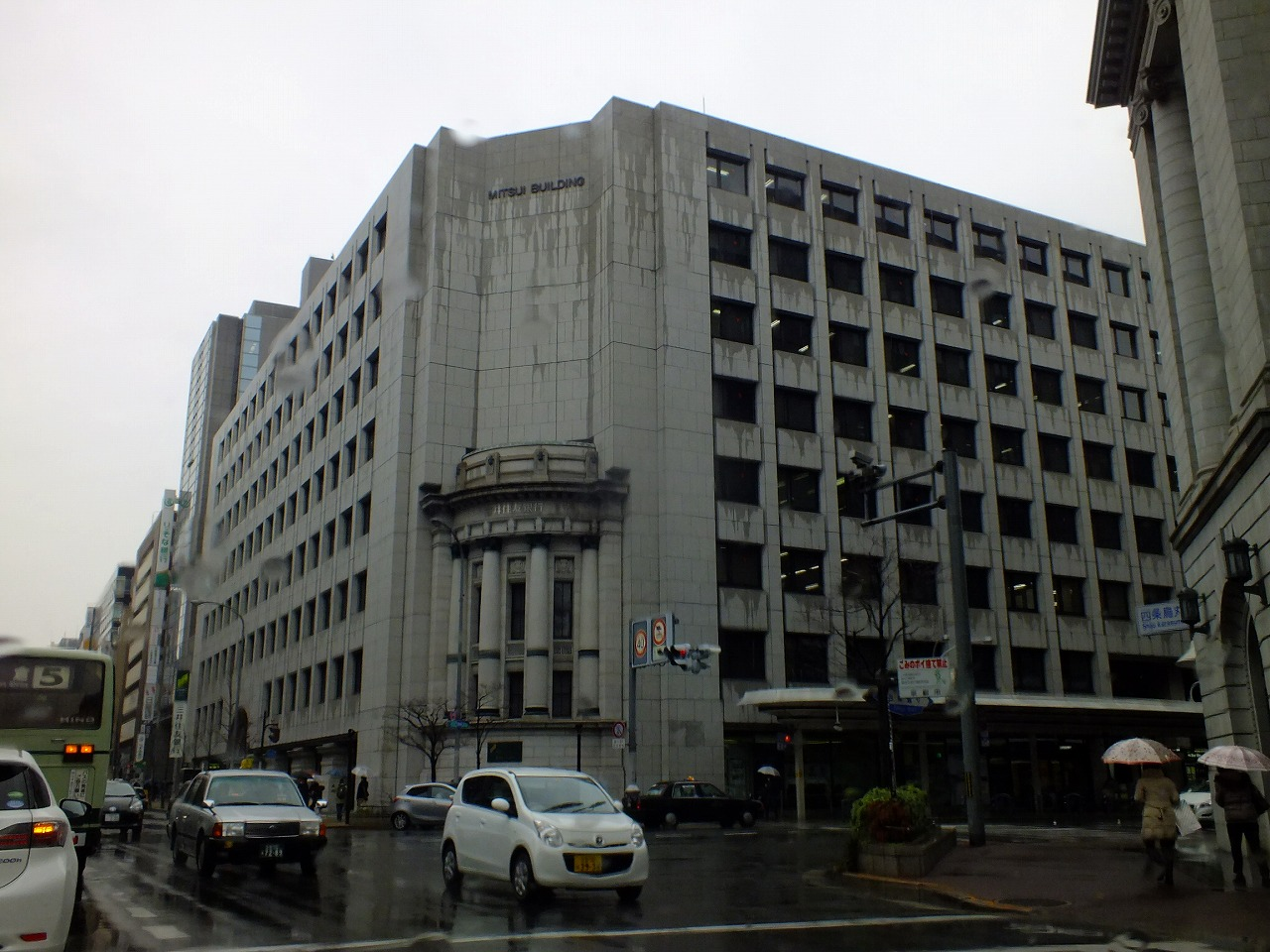
SMBC Kyoto Branch

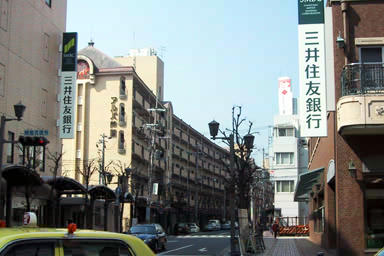
SMBC Ashiya Station branch

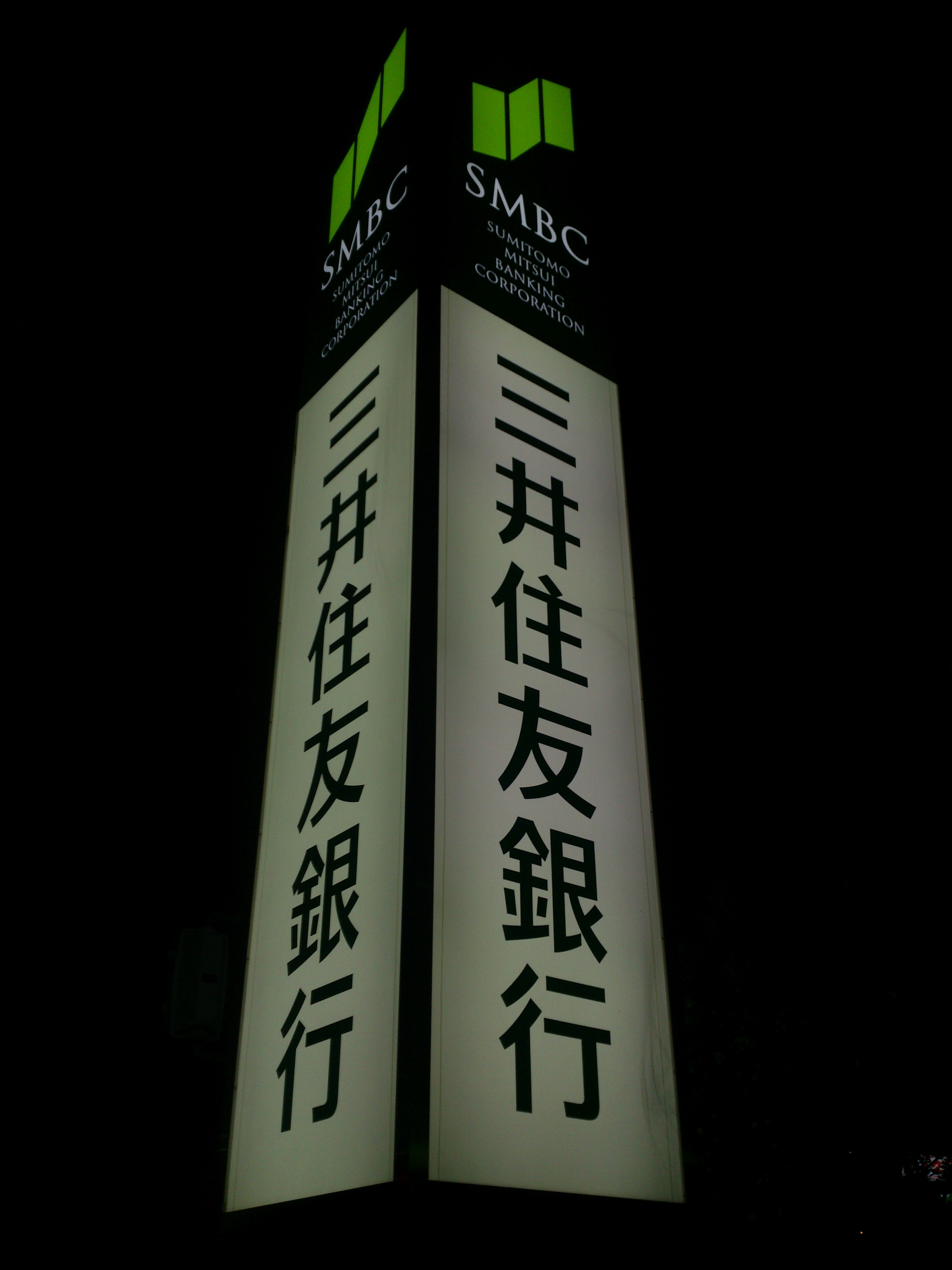
SMBC signage board

The core subsidiary of the SMBC Group is the banking unit, Sumitomo Mitsui Banking Corporation (SMBC). It is a major bank in Japan, ranked among the three leading megabanks and a wholly owned subsidiary of SMBC group, which holds 100% ownership.

The group's banking unit is organised in the following structure:

- Consumer Banking Unit
- Middle Market Unit
- Corporate Banking Unit
- Investment Banking Unit
- International Banking Unit
- Treasury Unit
- Compliance Unit
- Corporate Staff Unit

Throughout the years, the group has expanded into other related businesses such as leasing, brokerage and asset management. The major subsidiaries beside the banking unit include:

- Sumitomo Mitsui Finance & Leasing Co., Ltd. - It is a general leasing company formed through the merger of Sumitomo Mitsui Bank Lease (part of Sumitomo Mitsui Financial Group) and Sumitomo Lease (part of Sumitomo Corporation). Ownership is equally shared between SMBC Group and Sumitomo Corporation.
- SMBC Nikko Securities Co., Ltd. - It is a securities and brokerage company. In October 2009, the SMBC Group acquired all businesses of the former Nikko Cordial Securities (now Citigroup Japan Holdings) and certain businesses of Nikko Citigroup Securities (now Citigroup Securities). The entity is wholly owned by the SMBC Group.
- Sumitomo Mitsui Card Co., Ltd. - It is a credit card company, ranked among the top three in the industry in Japan. Established in December 1967 as an affiliate of the former Sumitomo Bank, the company adopted its current name in April 2001. In February 2003, it became a wholly owned subsidiary of SMBC Group, which now holds 100% ownership.
- SMBC Consumer Finance Co., Ltd. - It is a leading consumer finance company, widely recognized for its 'Promise' brand. After forming a capital and business alliance with SMBC Group in September 2004, the group conducted a tender offer and has maintained ownership to the present day.
- SMBC Trust Bank, Ltd. - It is a trust bank that was previously part of Société Générale in Japan. In October 2013, it became a wholly owned subsidiary of Sumitomo Mitsui Banking Corporation (SMBC), which now holds 100% ownership.
- Japan Research Institute Co., Ltd. - It is one of the five major think tanks in the country. Established in February 1969 as a separate entity from the former Sumitomo Bank, the company adopted its current name in December 1989. In February 2003, it became part of the group.
- Sumitomo Mitsui DS Asset Management Co., Ltd. - It is a major asset management company formed through the merger of Sumitomo Mitsui Asset Management (part of Sumitomo Mitsui Financial Group) and Daiwa SB Investment Management (part of Daiwa Securities). Ownership is shared among SMBC Group (50.1%), Daiwa Securities Group Inc. (23.5%), and three other companies.

=== Corporate governance ===
As of 2024, SMBC group operates with a Board of Directors comprising 13 members with diverse expertise, experience, and backgrounds, including a variety of genders and nationalities. A majority of the board—seven members—are outside directors. The chairman of the board, who does not have responsibilities related to day-to-day business operations, provides independent oversight of the executive officers and directors.

Outside directors also chair and serve on both legally mandated and voluntarily established committees. These directors can request reports on compliance, risk management, and other key matters, helping ensure that the company's governance system operates effectively and independently.

Over the years, the group has made several adjustments to its governance framework. In 2002, it established voluntary Nominating, Compensation, and Risk Committees as internal committees of the Board of Directors, followed by the addition of an Audit Committee in 2005. The company listed its shares on the New York Stock Exchange in 2010 to enhance transparency in financial reporting and diversify funding methods. In 2015, SMFG formalized its corporate governance guidelines.

By 2017, the group transitioned to a Company with Three Committees structure, increasing the number of outside directors and appointing them as chairpersons of the three legally mandated committees. In 2024, outside directors constituted the majority of the Board of Directors. A Sustainability Committee was also established in 2021, chaired by an outside director, to address environmental, social, and governance (ESG) issues.

The group's corporate governance system is designed to enhance oversight and expedite decision-making. The company conducts annual evaluations of the effectiveness of its Board of Directors and committees to identify areas for improvement. Core subsidiaries, such as Sumitomo Mitsui Banking Corporation and SMBC Nikko Securities, employ a Company with Audit and Supervisory Committee system as described in the Companies Act.

=== Leadership ===
- Group chief executive: Toru Nakashima (since December 2023)

==== Former group chief executives ====
1. Yoshifumi Nishikawa (December 2002 to June 2005)
2. Teisuke Kitayama (June 2005 to March 2011)
3. Koichi Miyata (April 2011 to March 2017)
4. Takeshi Kunibe (April 2017 to April 2019)
5. Jun Ohta (April 2019 to November 2023)

=== Listing ===
SMBC's shares has become listed on the first section of the Tokyo Stock Exchange, the Osaka Securities Exchange and the Nagoya Stock Exchange since December 2002. In March 2008, SMFG announced plans to list on the New York Stock Exchange by 2011. SMFG believed that listing in the US would be improve its financial transparency and international creditworthiness. Its stock tickers are TYO: 8316 and NYSE: SMFG.

=== Global operations ===
SMBC Group has offices in:

- Australia
- Bahrain
- Belgium
- Brazil
- Cambodia
- Canada
- Chile
- China
- Colombia
- Czechia
- Egypt
- France
- Germany
- Hong Kong
- India
- Indonesia
- Iran
- Ireland
- Italy
- Japan
- Malaysia
- Mexico
- Mongolia
- Myanmar
- Netherlands
- Peru
- Qatar
- Russia
- Saudi Arabia
- South Africa
- South Korea
- Singapore
- Spain
- Taiwan
- Thailand
- The Philippines
- Turkey
- UAE
- United Kingdom
- United States
- Vietnam

The overseas subsidiaries and affiliates of SMBC Group are as follows:

- European Sumitomo Mitsui Banking Corporation
- SMBC Bank EU AG
- Sumitomo Mitsui Banking (China) Co., Ltd.
- Manufacturer's Bank
- Brazil Sumitomo Mitsui Banking Corporation
- PT Bank SMBC Indonesia Tbk (formerly PT Bank BTPN Tbk)
- Russia Sumitomo Mitsui Banking Corporation
- Sumitomo Mitsui Banking Malaysia
- SMBC Capital Markets Company
- UK SMBC Nikko Capital Markets Company
- SMBC Aviation Capital
- SMBC Lease Finance Company
- SMBC Rail Services LLC
- SMBC Nikko Security America Corporation
- SMBC Financial Services Company
- SMC Cayman Elsie Limited
- S.F.V.I Company
- SMBC International Finance N.V.
- SMC Leasing Investment LLC
- SMC Capital Partners LLC
- SMBC MV ISPC
- SMBC DIP Limited
- SMBC Derivative Products Limited
- SMBC Capital India
- Sumitomo Mitsui Finance Dublin
- Sakura Finance Asia

=== SMBC Aviation Capital ===
SMBC Aviation Capital, formerly RBS Aviation Capital, is one of the world's largest aircraft leasing companies. Headquartered in the International Financial Services Centre in Dublin and with locations in Amsterdam, Beijing, Hong Kong, Kyiv, Moscow, New York, Seattle, Miami, Shanghai, Singapore, Tokyo and Toulouse, the company employs 160 people.

In 2012, the company was acquired by the Japanese consortium of Sumitomo Mitsui Banking Corporation (SMBC), Sumitomo Mitsui Finance and Leasing Company Limited (SMFL) and Sumitomo Corporation for US$7.3 billion which was the largest ever global sale of an aircraft leasing business. The sale completed on 1 June 2012 and the business was renamed SMBC Aviation Capital.

The company currently has a portfolio of 453 aircraft (273 owned and 180 managed) with a further 203 aircraft on order from Airbus and Boeing, made up of a mix of A320neos, A320-200s, B737-800s and B737 MAXs. It has more than 150 airline customers in over 50 countries worldwide, including a range of traditional carriers alongside start-up airlines.

Its strategy is to own and lease technologically advanced, efficient and frequently used aircraft types. SMBC Aviation Capital maintains a young fleet with an average weighted age of 4.7 years. The company has a BBB+ rating from Fitch.

The company is now in its 15th year in business. In July 2016, the company completed a debut US$500 million unsecured notes offering, which was eight times over-subscribed.

== Branding ==
=== Group name ===
The group was identified by its holding entity name, Sumitomo Mitsui Financial Group (SMFG), until early of 2018. By March 2018, the group established "SMBC Group" as its master brand name. Since then, the corporate group has been referred to as SMBC Group instead of SMFG. The press release by the company stated the move is to associate the brand with the group's core banking business, Sumitomo Mitsui Banking Corporation.

=== Corporate logo ===
SMBC Group's corporate logo uses "Rising Mark" sign. The background color is trad green, fresh green. The "SMBC" name is shown on the right side of the rising mark with white block letters.

=== Mascot character ===
In 2014, SMBC Group created an original mascot character called Midosuke, which imitates an otter. The body of the character is green in color, the neck of it is covered by a scarf with the color similar to SMBC group's rising mark logo. The character was designed by Tsuneo Goda (Dwarf Co., Ltd.). Originally, it was used mainly for official LINE accounts but later it has been used as commercials character, face design of cash cards or debit cards, and merchandise for bank customers.

=== Sponsorships ===
SMBC and Singapore Open have a title sponsorship deal since 2016, making the Singapore top golf tournament commercially known as SMBC Singapore Open. The Singapore Open is a golf tournament in Singapore that is part of the Asian Tour schedule. The event has been held at Sentosa Golf Club since 2005 and since 2017 has been part of the Open Qualifying Series, giving up to four non-exempt players entry into The Open Championship.

In April 2015, Sumitomo Mitsui Banking Corporation became a Gold Partner (banking category) for the Olympic and Paralympic Games Tokyo 2020.

Since 2014, SMBC has owned the naming rights for the Japan Series.

== Digital banking ==
=== IC cash card ===
As of 2017, SMBC issued IC cash cards at the bank's counters (only applicable to ordinary design deposit cash cards; cards of other designs and non-savings accounts are not eligible for immediate issuance).

An IC cash card is a single cash card that can be used with three method of identification: biometric authentication, IC chip or magnetic stripe, by setting the limit and registering biometric information (finger vein pattern). With this cash card, the security of usage improved since transactions relies on IC chip recording data and the pattern of past transactions that combined IC chip recording data and biometric authentication.

=== Artificial Intelligence ===
SMBC has been an early adopter of AI in its banking operation in Japan. It is the first Japanese bank to use IBM Watson since 2014 to support operators at its call center. AmiVoice, a voice recognition solution provided by SMBC, transforms inquiries into text on a real-time basis as a speech recognition system, while IBM Watson gives customers responses taken from service manuals and Q&As, thereby allowing digital operators to provide timely and correct answers to callers.

=== Jenius Bank ===
The group presence in digital banking is represented through its Jenius platform, which initially launched in Indonesia in 2016 under its subsidiary Bank Tabungan Pensiunan Nasional (BTPN).

Building on this, SMBC extended its digital banking initiative to the U.S. market with the establishment of Jenius Bank, a division of SMBC MANUBANK (formerly Manufacturers Bank), in mid-2023. Jenius Bank in the U.S. operates as a fully digital bank without physical branches, focusing on personal loans, savings, and checking accounts. By December 2024, it had surpassed $1 billion in deposits. Jenius Bank also plans to expand its services to include investment products and online securities brokerage.

As of 2025, the bank offers personal loans through partner companies like LendingTree. There are limitations for some US states: “Jenius Bank isn’t accepting high-yield savings account applications from residents of Hawaii and New Mexico. It also isn’t accepting personal loan applications from residents of Hawaii, Nevada, Wisconsin, or Maryland.“

In early 2026, SMBC notified impacted U.S. states of plans to wind down and close Jenius Bank in March of that year. In early May 2026, Jenius Bank savings accounts customers were transitioned to Axos Bank.

== Exposure to SMEs ==
Compared with its two megabank rivals, SMBC group has a greater exposure on retail customers and small and medium-size enterprises rather than large corporate clients. The group has implemented several strategic initiatives to support small and medium-sized enterprises (SMEs) across various regions. For instance, the SMBC Asia Rising Fund is a dedicated initiative aimed at supporting the growth of SMEs across Asia by providing access to financing and fostering cross-border business opportunities. By focusing on SMEs, the fund seeks to drive regional economic development while empowering smaller businesses to expand their operations and compete on a global scale. In November 2024, SMBC's Asia Rising Fund made a strategic investment in MODIFI, a digital trade finance platform.

In Indonesia, SMBC holds a significant stake in Bank BTPN which focuses on providing financial services to micro, small, and medium enterprises (MSMEs), as well as underbanked social groups.

Domestically, SMBC's Wholesale Business Unit services include financing, investment management, payments, M&A advisory, leasing, and real estate brokerage. The group's loan balance reached ¥19.6 billion ($143 million) for mid-sized corporates and SMEs during the year ending March 2022. Notably, in the January to March 2022 quarter, the average loan balance for SMEs and mid-sized companies exceeded that of large corporates.

On the risk perspective, the SME exposure is seen as higher risk assets by rating agencies. For instance, S&P Global Ratings and Fitch ratings mentioned that SMBC group's exposure to mid-sized corporates and SMEs, while providing higher margin, may leave asset quality more susceptible to economic downcycles than peers.

== Environmental policy and record ==
SMBC group has outlined several initiatives related to sustainability and climate change. The company has committed to achieving net-zero operational greenhouse gas (GHG) emissions by 2030 and portfolio emissions by 2050. Its efforts include implementing transition finance, supporting renewable energy projects, and facilitating the early retirement of coal-fired power plants. The group has also introduced environmental and social due diligence into its credit assessments and set mid-term GHG reduction targets for sectors such as power, oil and gas, and real estate. Additionally, the establishment of a Sustainability Division supports the company’s approach to managing climate-related risks and integrating sustainability into its operations.

SMBC was among the first Japanese Bank to adopt the Equator Principles, an international set of social and environmental standards for financial institutions launched in 2003. The bank updated its policy to exclude the funding of ultrasupercritical coal power.

In regard to green financing, SMBC has been involved in funding renewable energy projects globally, amounting to three trillion yen. As one of the leading players in finance for offshore wind power and solar energy generation, SMBC has been funding renewable power plant projects with a total capacity of more than 10 GW by 2018. Since 2016, the bank has supported 44 project finance deals in renewable energy area. The projects consist of 20 solar energy, 17 wind energy, 3 Geothermal Energy, 2 Hydropower, 1 Biomass 1 Submarine power cable, 1 waste-to-energy in the Americas, Asia, Europe, and Australasia.

However, international environmental groups have criticized SMBC for failing to adhere to its social environmental standards, because SMBC is still involved in the financing of coal projects such as the Vung Ang 2 and Nghi Son 2 coal power station in Vietnam. In December 2019, a research released at United Nations Climate Change conference named SMBC Group among the top three private lender to coal developers between January 2017 and September 2019.

SMBC also involves as one of lead arrangers for a massive oil pipeline under construction in Uganda and Tanzania. The construction of East Africa Crude Oil Pipeline is a part of a push to open oil fields around Uganda’s Lake Albert to international markets, which will be connected to the port of Tanga in Tanzania. The required investment value is estimated at US$3.5 billion. With 1,443 kilometres of length, it will be the longest heated pipeline in the world. International organizations warned the environmental risks to fresh water sources including Lake Victoria, which supports the livelihoods of more than 30 million people in the region.

Having said this, news reported that SMBC is to reconsider its prolific funding of coal-fired plants, the first of the nation's major banks to do so.

== Controversies ==
=== Administrative actions imposed by FSA in 2006 ===
In 2006, the group was subjected to administrative actions by Japan's Financial Services Agency (FSA) under Article 26 of the Banking Law. These measures were imposed following findings by the Fair Trade Commission of Japan (JFTC), which revealed that SMBC had violated Article 19 of the Anti-Monopoly Law by abusing its dominant position in the sales of interest-rate derivative products between 2001 and 2004. The JFTC identified multiple instances of misconduct, including coercive sales practices for interest-rate swaps, and further internal investigations revealed systemic governance and compliance failures within SMBC. These issues stemmed from a profit-driven culture that prioritized sales targets over legal and ethical compliance, inadequate internal controls, and insufficient risk awareness regarding antitrust regulations.

The administrative actions mandated several corrective measures to address SMBC’s governance deficiencies and compliance failures. Sales operations for interest-rate derivative products in the corporate sales department were suspended for six months, from May 15, 2006, to November 14, 2006, except when customers voluntarily expressed interest. Additionally, SMBC was prohibited from establishing new corporate sales departments for one year, until May 14, 2007. To enforce long-term compliance, SMBC was required to overhaul its governance framework, including establishing a customer-oriented sales system, improving internal auditing, strengthening compliance oversight, and ensuring thorough training for employees on legal and ethical standards. Specific reforms included clearer accountability for executives and employees involved in the misconduct, enhanced systems for handling customer complaints and inquiries, and stricter controls over financial instrument sales practices.

=== Yakuza exclusion ordinances ===
Since 2011, Japan's law regulators have enacted a series of policies aiming to battle organized crime in the country, such as exclusion ordinances that made it illegal for banks to do business with yakuza gang members. In 2013, the Financial Services Agency, Japan's financial watchdog, started an investigation of the three mega banks over possible ties to organised crime after Mizuho banking group was accused of lending more than US$2 million to people affiliated with organized crime groups in Japan. The probe also focused on compliance practices and risk management systems of the banks.

In order to distance themselves from the yakuza, the Japanese Bankers Association's members, including SMBC Group, started to compile their own lists on yakuza and other so-called anti-social forces to keep undesirable persons from using their services.

=== 2012 SMBC Nikko Securities insider trading probe ===
In June 2012, an employee of SMBC Nikko securities was arrested for alleged insider trading due to suspicions of having leaked information on tender offers. The employee allegedly provided leaked information on tender offers for at least more than 10 firms to a company top personnel and other recipients. One such piece of information was regarding a management buyout bid by a wine trading house, Enoteca Co., before the takeover bid was listed on the Tokyo Stock Exchange's Second Section in February.

At the time, the employee worked as the deputy head of investment banking for SMBC Nikko, on secondment from Tokyo-based Sumitomo Mitsui's banking unit since October 2009. He became the first banker from a major Japanese brokerage to be detained for suspected insider trading since 2008. He was ultimately convicted by Yokohama District Court in 2013 and charged with prison sentence of 2 years and 6 months.

As a consequence of this event, The Tokyo Stock Exchange fined SMBC Nikko Securities 80 million yen (US$1.02 million).

=== 2021 SMBC Nikko Securities Stock Manipulation Scandal ===
SMBC Nikko Securities Inc. has been embroiled in a major stock price manipulation scandal, resulting in significant legal and financial consequences. The Tokyo District Court, on February 2023, fined the company 700 million yen (about $5.3 million) and imposed an additional penalty of 4.47 billion yen. This ruling stemmed from allegations that the brokerage had engaged in illegal practices to manipulate the closing prices of 10 stocks listed on the First Section of the Tokyo Stock Exchange between 2019 and 2021.

As part of the verdict, Teruya Sugino, the former deputy head of SMBC Nikko’s equities division, was sentenced to 18 months in prison. However, the sentence was suspended for three years due to his role in violating the Financial Instruments and Exchange Law. According to the court, SMBC Nikko used approximately 4.4 billion yen of its own funds to place large buy orders just before market close, artificially boosting stock prices. These inflated prices were then used in block trades, where the brokerage mediated transactions between major shareholders and investors. The firm was suspected of using its proprietary trading desk to illegitimately maintain the price of stocks in block trades.

The court determined that the firm profited unlawfully, gaining around 1.09 billion yen from the scheme. Sugino was specifically implicated in one of the block trades. The court concluded that there was a significant failure in SMBC Nikko's internal supervision, with Sugino bearing substantial responsibility for his role in facilitating the scheme, despite being aware of its illegality. In addition to Sugino, five other SMBC Nikko executives, including former Vice President Toshihiro Sato, have been indicted in the scandal. On 13 April, prosecutors charged the vice president and filed new criminal charges against the firm. On 14 February 2023, a court ordered SMBC Nikko Securities to pay a fine of 700 million yen ($5.3 million) and an additional penalty of around 4.47 billion yen for manipulating stock prices.

=== Omori branch employee fraud ===
A former deputy branch manager of the Omori branch illegally operated the foreign currency deposit transaction system from November 2015 to June 2016. The employee was accused of stealing around ¥190 million (US$1.84 million) by manipulating the bank's foreign exchange trading system.

=== Hugh Rodley bank raid ===
A group of criminal hackers including Hugh Rodley, security insider Kevin O'Donoghue, and Soho sex shop owner David Nash were found guilty of an attempted high-tech robbery of £229m from Sumitomo Mitsui Banking Corporation's London branch in September 2004. Henchmen Jan Van Osselaer and Gilles Poelvoorde were also found guilty of conspiracy to steal. The plot was discovered by Sumitomo Mitsui staff, and no money was stolen. Another accused, Bernard Davies, died before trial.

=== Bank of East Asia dispute with Elliott Management ===
Hedge fund activist investor Elliott Management filed a lawsuit against BEA in July 2016 in Hong Kong court over a share placement transaction. Elliott Management, which held 7% of listed shares of BEA, had included majority of the bank's directors, its CEO and chairman in the lawsuit. The transaction in question was on BEA's issuance of new shares to Japan's Sumitomo Mitsui Banking Corp (SMBC) in 2015. Elliott cited "allegations of unfairly prejudicial conduct" and "alleged serious corporate governance failings".

In response, BEA applied to have Elliott's petition against them "struck out". This case was heard by Mr. Justice Jonathan Harris from 17 to 19 July 2017.

== Notable current and former employees ==
- Hiroaki Shukuzawa
- Daizo Kusuda, member of the House of Representatives
- Ichiro Miyashita, member of the House of Representatives
- Yoshio Kimura, member of the House of Councillors in the Japan Diet office
- Laurel Powers-Freeling

== See also ==
- List of systemically important banks
