= SMBC Nikko Securities =

Japanese Securities Brokerage

SMBC Nikko Securities Inc.

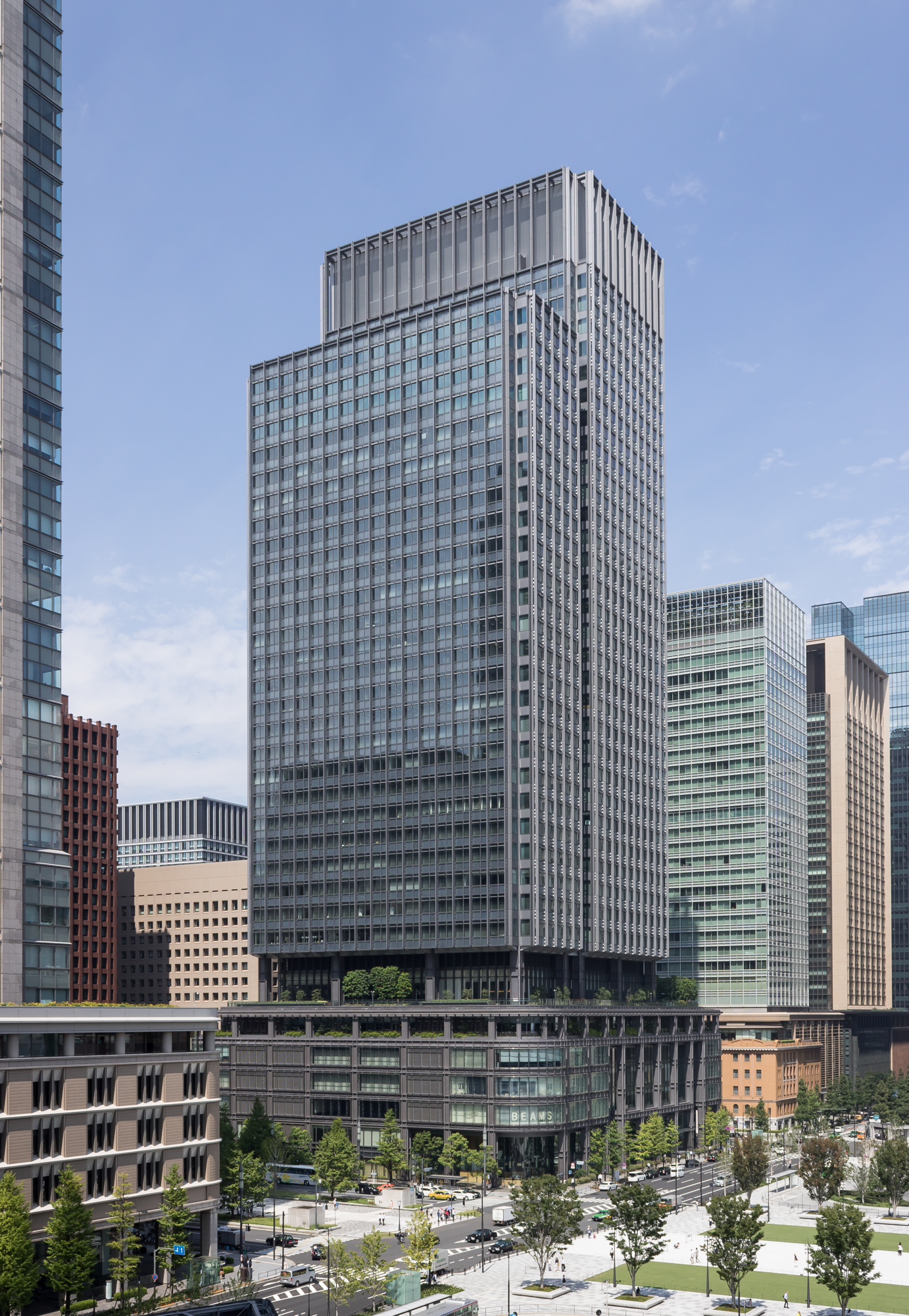
- Headquarters at the Shin-Marunouchi Building
- Native name: SMBC日興証券株式会社
- Company type: Subsidiary
- Industry: Financial services
- Founded: June 15, 2009; 16 years ago
- Founder: Genichi Toyama
- Headquarters: 3-1, Marunouchi 3-chome, Chiyoda-ku, Tokyo 100-8325, Japan, Japan
- Key people: Yasuyuki Kawasaki (chairman); Yuichiro Kondo (president & CEO)
- Services: Securities brokerage Investment banking
- Number of employees: 9,355 (31 December 2021)
- Parent: Sumitomo Mitsui Financial Group
- Website: www.smbcnikko.co.jp

SMBC Nikko Securities Inc. (SMBC日興証券株式会社) is a securities firm in Japan which engages in the operation of large-scale comprehensive securities broking and trading services. The company was founded in 2009 and is headquartered in Tokyo, Japan. It is a wholly owned subsidiary of the Sumitomo Mitsui Financial Group. It is the third largest securities brokerage firm in Japan.

== History ==
The origins of SMBC Nikko Securities can be traced back to a company named Kawashimaya Shoten (川島屋商店) which was formed in July 1918 by Genichi Toyama. It was formed to buy and sell stocks and bonds.

In 1920, the firm was created out of the securities department of the Industrial Bank of Japan and incorporated as a stock company. In 1939, Kawashimaya Shoten spun off its securities division forming Kawashimaya Securities. In 1943, Kawashimaya Securities absorbed Kawashimaya Shoten. In 1944, Kawashimaya Securities and Nikko Securities merged, and the resulting company used the Nikko Securities trade name.

In 2001, the firm changed its name from Nikko Securities to Nikko Cordial Securities.

In 2007, the firm became a subsidiary of Citigroup after Citigroup purchased Nikko Cordial Corporation forming Nikko Citi Holdings Inc.

In September 2009, Citigroup sold the firm to the Sumitomo Mitsui Banking Corporation.

In 2011, the firm changed its name from Nikko Cordial Securities to SMBC Nikko Securities. In 2016, the firm became a wholly owned direct subsidiary of Sumitomo Mitsui Financial Group.

In 2018, the firm merged with SMBC Friend Securities, while continuing to use the SMBC Nikko Securities trade name.

== Controversies ==
=== 2012 insider trading fine ===
In April 2012, the Financial Services Agency fined the firm for leaking information about a stock offering which was considered insider trading. Directors of the firm passed on word of the offering to at least 21 sales branches without carrying out the proper internal procedures to control the information flow. At eight of those branches a total of 23 sales staff tipped off 34 clients to purchase the shares once the deal was launched. The deal was said to be a roughly 1 trillion yen ($12.4 billion) offering by Sumitomo Mitsui Financial Group, Nikko's parent, in early 2010.

=== Investigation into block trade market manipulation ===
In November 2021, the Securities and Exchange Surveillance Commission (SESC) launched an investigation into the firm over suspicious stock transactions. The firm was suspected of using its proprietary trading desk to illegitimately maintain the price of stocks in block trades. The firm launched a complaint with financial regulators after a senior trader died following intensive questioning. On 4 March 2022, four employees of the firm were arrested on allegations of market manipulation in connection with the same block trades. The employees were Trevor Hill (Head of equity), Alexandre Avakiants (Deputy head of equity), Makoto Yamada (General manager of equity trading) and Shinichiro Okazaki (General manager of structured products). The firm's President & CEO, Yuichiro Kondo issued a public apology afterwards. On 24 March 2022, prosecutors arrested a vice president of the firm and brought criminal charges against the company and five bankers. On 13 April, prosecutors charged the vice president and filed new criminal charges against the firm. On 14 February 2023, a court ordered SMBC Nikko Securities to pay a fine of 700 million yen ($5.3 million) and an additional penalty of around 4.47 billion yen for manipulating stock prices.
