= Japanese financial system =

The main elements of Japan's financial system are much the same as those of other major industrialized nations: a commercial banking system, which accepts deposits, extends loans to businesses, and deals in foreign exchange; specialized government-owned financial institutions, which fund various sectors of the domestic economy; securities companies, which provide brokerage services, underwrite corporate and government securities, and deal in securities markets; capital markets, which offer the means to finance public and private debt and to sell residual corporate ownership; and money markets, which offer banks a source of liquidity and provide the Bank of Japan with a tool to implement monetary policy.

== Banks ==
Japan's traditional banking system was segmented into clearly defined components in the late 1980s: commercial banks (thirteen major and sixty-four smaller regional banks), long-term credit banks (seven), trust banks (seven), mutual loan and savings banks (sixty-nine), and various specialized financial institutions. During the 1980s, a rapidly growing group of nonbank operations—such as consumer loan, credit card, leasing, and real estate organizations—began performing some of the traditional functions of banks, such as the issuing of loans.

In the early postwar financial system, city banks provided short-term loans to major domestic corporations while regional banks took deposits and extended loans to medium-sized and small businesses. Neither engaged much in international business. In the 1950s and 1960s, a specialized bank, the Bank of Tokyo, took care of most of the government's foreign-exchange needs and functioned as the nation's foreign-banking representative. Long-term credit banks were intended to complement rather than to compete with the commercial banks. Authorized to issue debentures rather than take ordinary deposits, they specialized in long-term lending to major keiretsu.

Trust banks were authorized to conduct retail and trust banking and often combined the work of commercial and long-term credit banks. Trust banks not only managed portfolios but also raised funds through the sale of negotiable loan trust certificates. Mutual loan and savings banks, credit associations, credit cooperatives, and labor credit associations collected individual deposits from general depositors. These deposits were then loaned to cooperative members and to the liquidity-starved city banks via the interbank money markets or were sent to central cooperative banks, which in turn loaned the funds to small businesses and corporations. More than 8,000 agricultural, forestry, and fishery cooperatives performed many of the same functions for the cooperatives. Many of their funds were transmitted to their central bank, the Norinchukin Bank, which was the world's largest bank in terms of domestic deposits.

In 1990, the five largest banks in the world, measured by total assets, were Japanese banks. These banks opened branches abroad, acquired existing foreign banks, and became engaged in new activities, such as underwriting Euro-yen bond issues. The investment houses also increased overseas activities, especially participating in the United States Treasury bond market (where as much as 25 to 30% of each new issue was purchased by Japanese investors in the late 1980s). As of March 1989, the five largest city banks in Japan (in order of total fund volume) were Dai-Ichi Kangyo Bank, Sumitomo Bank, Fuji Bank, Mitsubishi Bank, and Sanwa Bank.

== Government institutions ==
A group of government financial institutions paralleled the private banking sector. The Japan Export-Import Bank (JEXIM), the Japan Development Bank, and a number of finance corporations, such as the Housing Loan Corporation, promoted the growth of specialized sectors of the domestic economy. These institutions derived their funding from deposits collected by the postal savings system and deposited with the Trust Fund Bureau. The postal savings system, through the 24,000 post offices, accepted funds in various forms, including savings, annuities, and insurance. The post offices offered the highest interest rates for regular savings accounts (8% for time deposits in 1990) and tax-free savings until 1988, thereby collecting more deposits and accounts than any other institution in the world.

The Japan Bank for International Cooperation (JBIC) is the only government institution with an international focus. This bank provides financing for trade between Japan and developing countries, performing the function of export-import banks run by governments in other countries (including the United States), although its participation is possibly greater.

== Securities ==
Japan's securities markets increased their volume of dealings rapidly during the late 1980s, led by Japan's rapidly expanding securities firms. There were three categories of securities companies in Japan, the first consisting of the "Big Four" securities houses (among the six largest such firms in the world): Nomura, Daiwa, Nikko, and Yamaichi. The Big Four played a key role in international financial transactions and were members of the New York Stock Exchange. Nomura was the world's largest single securities firm; its net capital, in excess of US$10 billion in 1986, exceeded that of Merrill Lynch, Salomon Brothers, and Shearson Lehman combined. In 1986, Nomura became the first Japanese member of the London Stock Exchange. Nomura and Daiwa were primary dealers in the United States Treasury bond market. The second tier of securities firms contained ten medium-sized firms. The third tier consisted of all the smaller securities firms registered in Japan. Many of these smaller firms were affiliates of the Big Four, while some were affiliated with banks. In 1986 eighty-three of the smaller firms were members of the Tokyo Securities and Stock Exchange. Japan's securities firms derived most of their income from brokerage fees, equity and bond trading, underwriting, and dealing. Other services included the administration of trusts. In the late 1980s, a number of foreign securities firms, including Salomon Brothers and Merrill Lynch, became players in Japan's financial world.

Japanese insurance companies became important leaders in international finance in the late 1980s. More than 90% of the population owned life insurance and the amount held per person was at least 50% greater than in the United States. Many Japanese used insurance companies as savings vehicles. Insurance companies' assets grew at a rate of more than 20% per year in the late 1980s, reaching nearly US$694 billion in 1988. The life insurance companies moved heavily into foreign investments as deregulation allowed them to do so and as their resources increased through the spread of fully funded pension funds. These assets permitted the companies to become major players in international money markets. Nippon Life Insurance Company, the world's largest insurance firm, was reportedly the biggest single holder of United States Treasury securities in 1989.

=== Stock Exchange ===
The Tokyo Securities and Stock Exchange became the largest in the world in 1988, in terms of the combined market value of outstanding shares and capitalization, while the Osaka Stock Exchange ranked third after those of Tokyo and New York. Although there are eight stock exchanges in Japan, the Tokyo Securities and Stock Exchange represented 83% of the nation's total equity in 1988. Of the 1,848 publicly traded domestic companies in Japan at the end of 1986, about 80% were listed on the Tokyo Securities and Stock Exchange.

Two developments in the late 1980s helped in the rapid expansion of the Tokyo Securities and Stock Exchange. The first was a change in the financing of company operations. Traditionally large firms obtained funding through bank loans rather than capital markets, but in the late 1980s they began to rely more on direct financing. The second development came in 1986 when the Tokyo exchange permitted non-Japanese brokerage firms to become members for the first time. By 1988 the exchange had sixteen foreign members. The Tokyo Securities and Stock Exchange had 124 member companies in 1990. In 1990, five types of securities were traded on the Tokyo exchange: stocks, bonds, investment trusts, rights, and warrants alone.

Japan's stock market dealings exploded in the 1980s, with increased trading volume and rapidly rising stock prices. The trading recorded by the Nikkei 225 stock average, compiled by the Nihon Keizai Shimbun (Japan Economic Daily), grew from 6,850 in October 1982 to nearly 39,000 in early 1990. During one six-month period in 1986, total trade volume on the Tokyo exchange increased by 250% with wild swings in the Nikkei. After the plunge of the New York Stock Exchange in October 1987, the Tokyo average dropped by 15%, but there was a sharp recovery by early 1988. This was the height of the Japanese asset price bubble, which collapsed in the year 1990, and was followed by the lost decade.
