= Nikko Cordial =

Former Japanese holding company

Nikko Cordial Corporation 株式会社日興コーディアルグループ
- Company type: K.K.
- Traded as: TYO: 8303; SGX: N06
- Industry: Brokerage
- Founded: April 1, 1944
- Successor: SMBC Nikko Securities
- Headquarters: Chuo, Tokyo, Japan
- Website: nikko.co.jp

Nikko Cordial Corporation Kabushiki-kaisha Nikkō Kōdiaru Gurūpu (株式会社日興コーディアルグループ) was the holding company for Nikko Cordial Securities, Japan's third largest brokerage until 2008, when Nikko Cordial Corporation became a wholly owned subsidiary of Citigroup; upon completion of share exchange, it merged with Citigroup Japan Holdings Ltd. to form Nikko Citi Holdings Inc., before changing its name to Citigroup Japan Holdings Corp. in 2009.

Nikko Cordial sued three of its former executives for fraud, including former Chief executive officer Junichi Arimura, for ¥3.4 billion. Nikko Cordial's profits decreased by 32.9% following the scandal. The lawsuit was settled by Citigroup in June 2009.

In 2007 Citigroup acquired a majority shareholding in Nikko Cordial for $7.7 billion. In October 2009, all of the operations of Nikko Cordial Securities and certain businesses of Nikko Citigroup, such as the domestic stock and bond underwriting business among others, were sold to Sumitomo Mitsui Financial Group. Nikko Cordial was being reorganized into a new subsidiary company, SMBC Nikko Securities Inc., in April 2011.

== Nikko Cordial subsidiaries ==
- Monex – retail securities firm
- Nikko Citigroup – joint venture with Citigroup involved in investment banking, trading and research.
- Nikko Cordial Securities – retail and corporate securities firm
