= Taiyo Kobe Bank =

Japanese bank

Taiyō Kōbe Bank
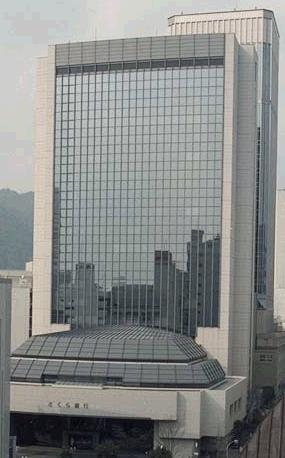
- Former head office building in Kobe
- Native name: 太陽神戸銀行
- Romanized name: Taiyō Kōbe Ginkō
- Industry: Banking
- Defunct: March 25, 1990
- Headquarters: Japan
- Footnotes / references Infobox contains data translated from the corresponding Japanese Wikipedia article

The Taiyo-Kobe Bank or TKB (太陽神戸銀行, Taiyo-Kobe Ginko) was a major Japanese bank, resulting from the 1973 merger of two banks established in 1936 and 1940 respectively. It was a rare major Japanese commercial bank unaffiliated with either a keiretsu group or a sogo shosha trading company.

TKB merged with Mitsui Bank in 1990 to form Mitsui Taiyo Kobe Bank (MTKB), renamed the Sakura Bank in April 1992, itself a predecessor entity of Sumitomo Mitsui Banking Corporation (SMBC).

== Bank of Kobe ==
The Bank of Kobe was established in Kobe in 1936 and became a major lender to the industrial sector in the Kobe region, as well as a major financier for the city of Kobe. It established several overseas offices in the 1950s and 1960s to support its municipal finance operations.

== Taiyo Bank ==
Dai Nippon Mujin was a mutual savings and loan company established in 1940. It changed its name to Nippon Mujin in 1948, to Nippon Sogo Bank in 1951, then to Taiyo Bank in 1968 in an attempt to project a more international image.

== Taiyo-Kobe merger ==
The two banks merged in 1973, which gave the combined TKB the largest branch network of any Japanese bank. The bank grew consistently through the 1970s and 1980s and opened numerous overseas offices.

== TKB-Mitsui Bank merger ==
TKB agreed to merge with Mitsui Bank in 1989. At the time (in the midst of the Japanese asset price bubble), the merger was to create the second largest bank in the world behind Dai-Ichi Kangyo Bank. While TKB had a strong base of individual and small business customers, Mitsui had a complementary base of larger institutional clients. The merger was aimed at leveraging these synergies, as well as providing stronger competition against European banks, which were expected to consolidate following a deregulation in 1992.
