= Mitsui Bank =

Former Japanese bank

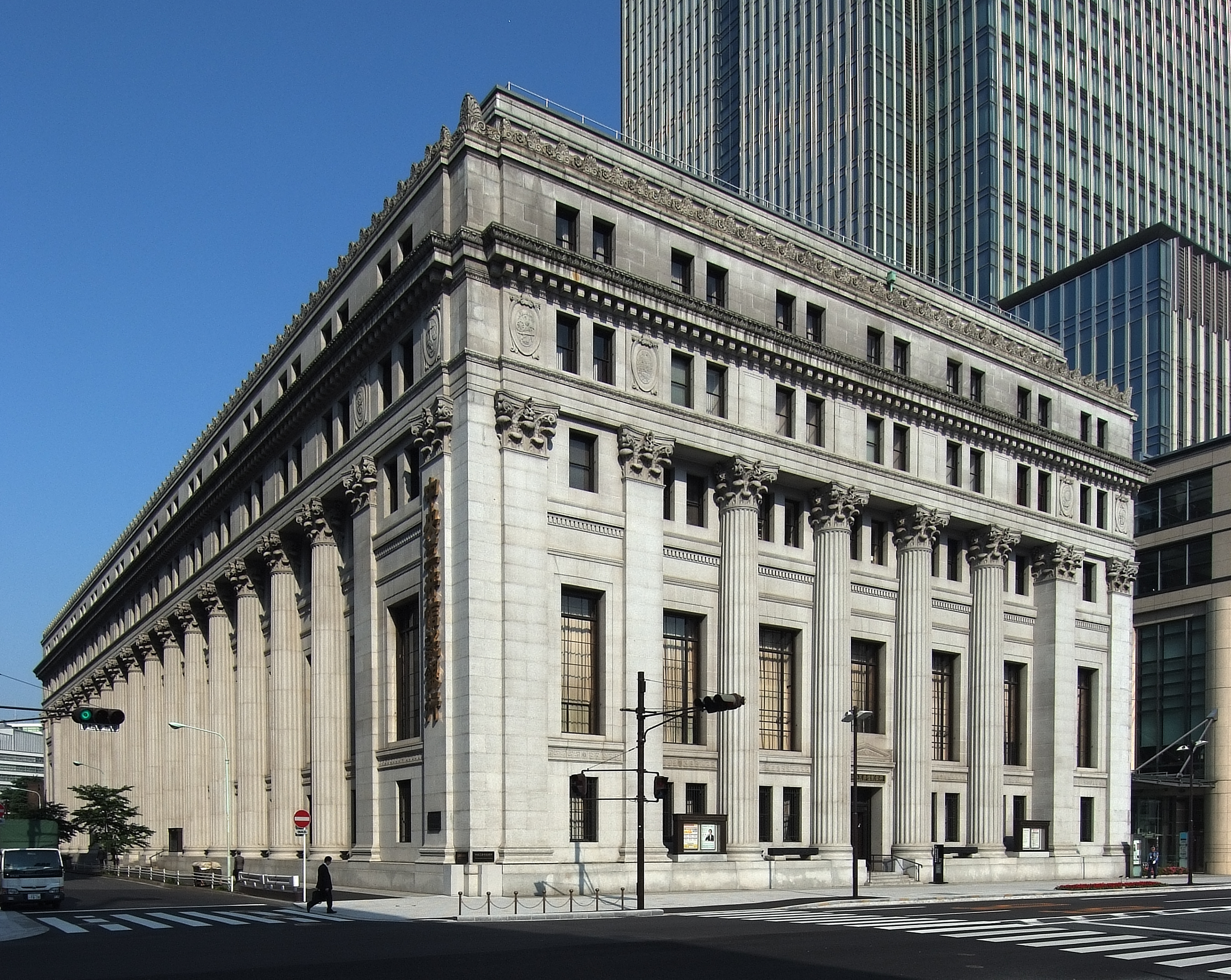
Mitsui Honkan building in Nihonbashi, Tokyo, photographed in 2009; head office building of Mitsui Bank and Teikoku Bank from completion in 1929 until 1960, and home of Mitsui Memorial Museum since 2005

Mitsui Bank, Ltd. (三井銀行, Mitsui Ginkō) was a major Japanese bank from 1876 to 1990. The home bank of the Mitsui conglomerate, it was one of the largest Japanese banks for much of the 20th century, together with Dai-Ichi Bank, Mitsubishi Bank, Sumitomo Bank, and Yasuda / Fuji Bank. In 1943 it merged with Dai-Ichi Bank to form Teikoku Bank (Japanese: 帝国銀行, lit. 'Imperial Bank'). In 1948, Dai-Ichi Bank was spun off again from Teikoku, which changed its name back to Mitsui Bank in 1954.

In 1990, Mitsui Bank merged with Taiyo Kobe Bank to form Mitsui Taiyo Kobe Bank (MTKB), which was renamed Sakura Bank in April 1992 and was a predecessor entity of Sumitomo Mitsui Banking Corporation (SMBC).

== Early development ==
The Mitsui family began banking operations in 1683, when the Tokugawa Shogunate granted Mitsui Takatoshi permission to act as a money changer.

Mitsui Bank was established as a private company in July 1876, with capital of two million yen. It was one of the Japanese government's main banks for deposits and tax collections until the formation of the Bank of Japan in 1882. In ensuing decades, the Mitsui family took over numerous government industrial plants to form a major zaibatsu conglomerate, with the bank as one of its core businesses. Mitsui Bank reorganized as an unlimited partnership in 1893, and as a limited company (capital stock: ¥20 million) in 1909.

By 1929, Mitsui Bank had 6 offices outside of Japan and its colonies, including in London and New York. That was more than Mitsubishi Bank and Yasuda Bank, though less than Sumitomo Bank let alone the Yokohama Specie Bank, Bank of Chōsen and Bank of Taiwan, for which foreign trade was part of a public-interest mandate under special legislation.

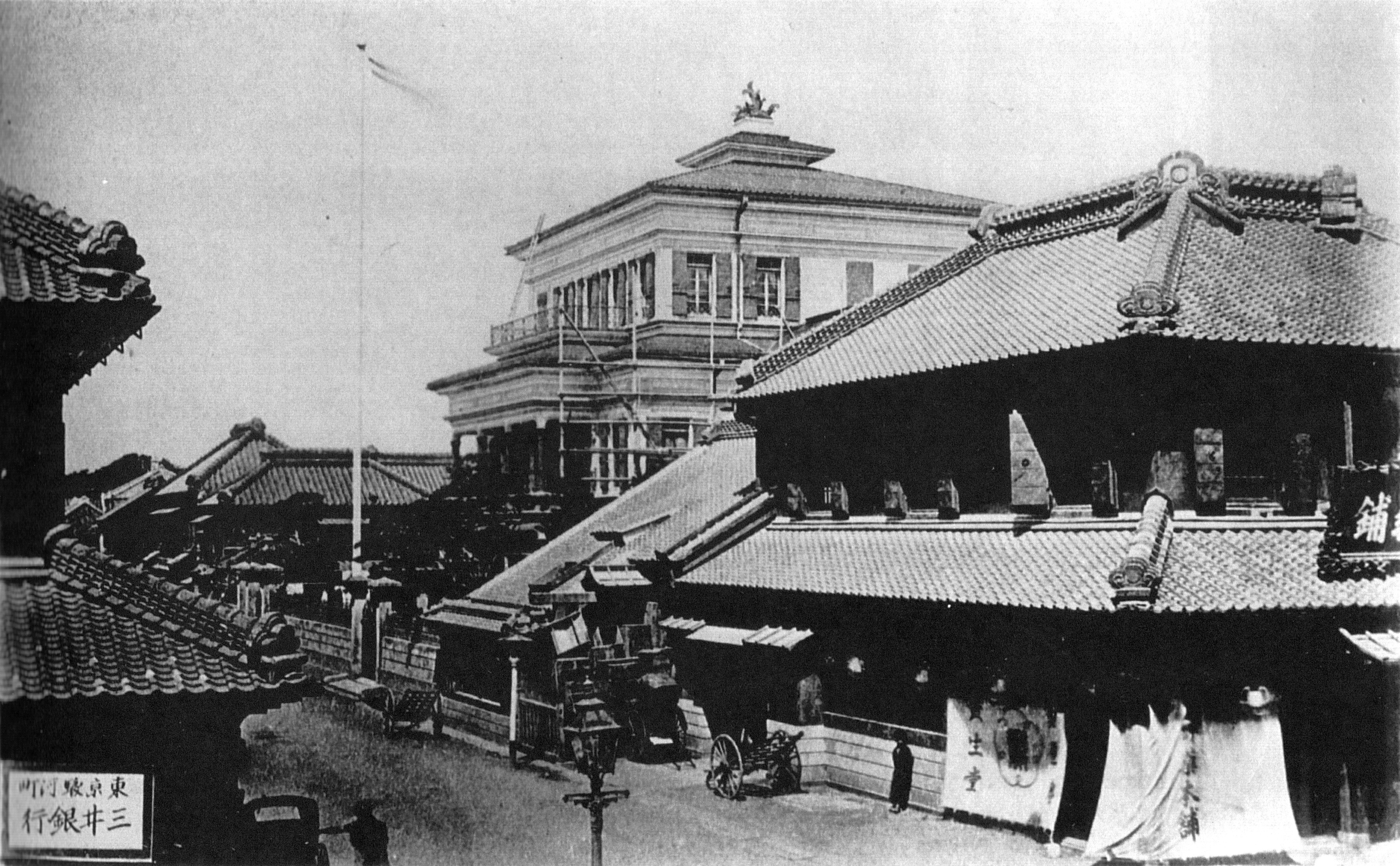
Mitsui trading house photographed in 1874

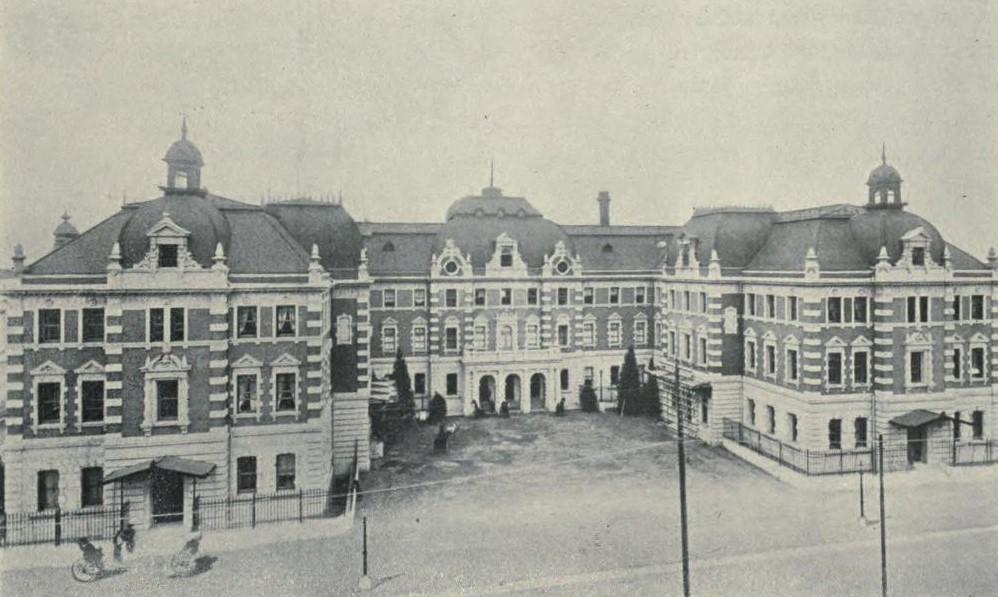
Mitsui Bank's head office building in Tokyo, photographed in 1910; destroyed in the 1923 Great Kantō earthquake

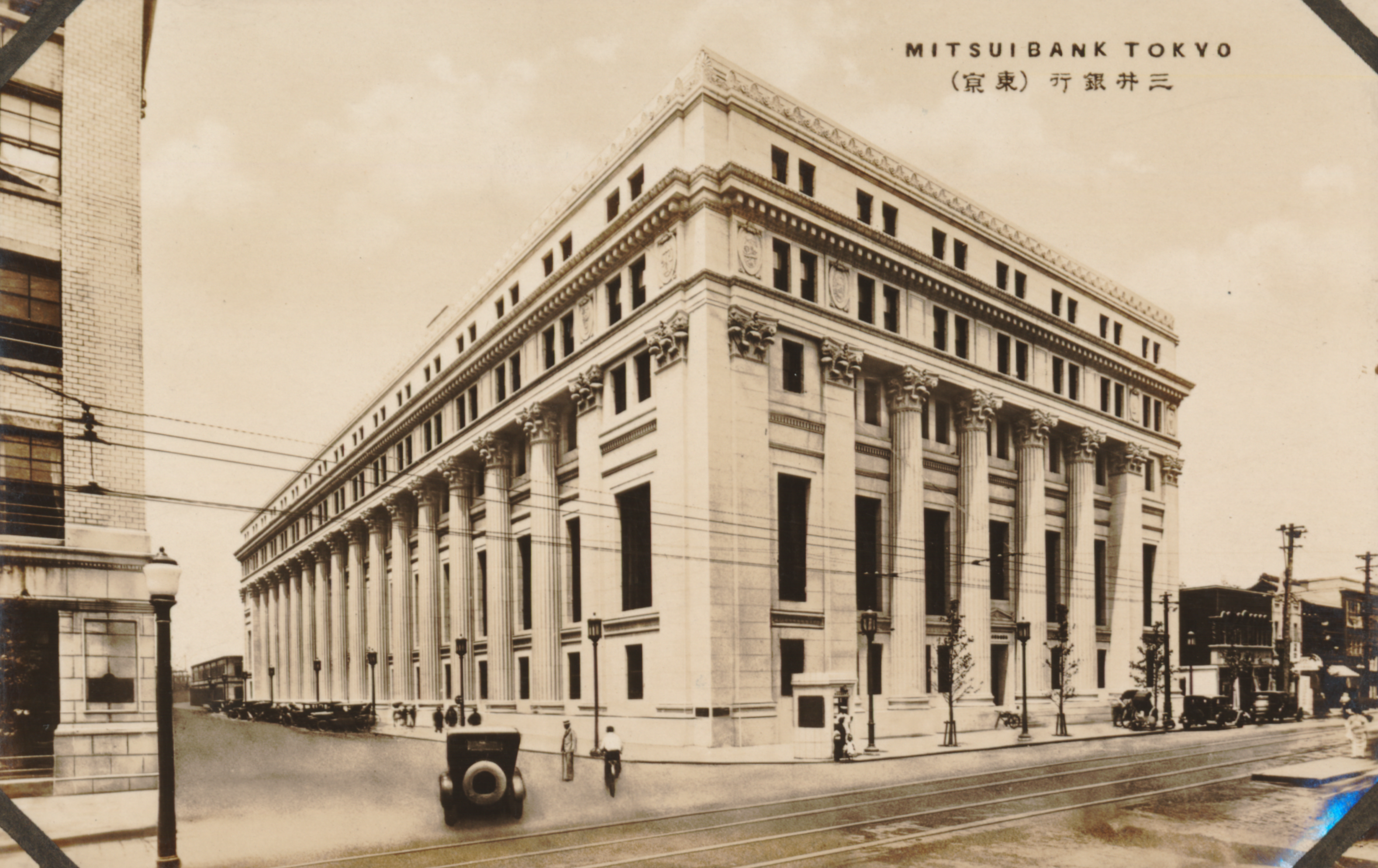
Tokyo head office building shortly after reconstruction on the same site in 1929

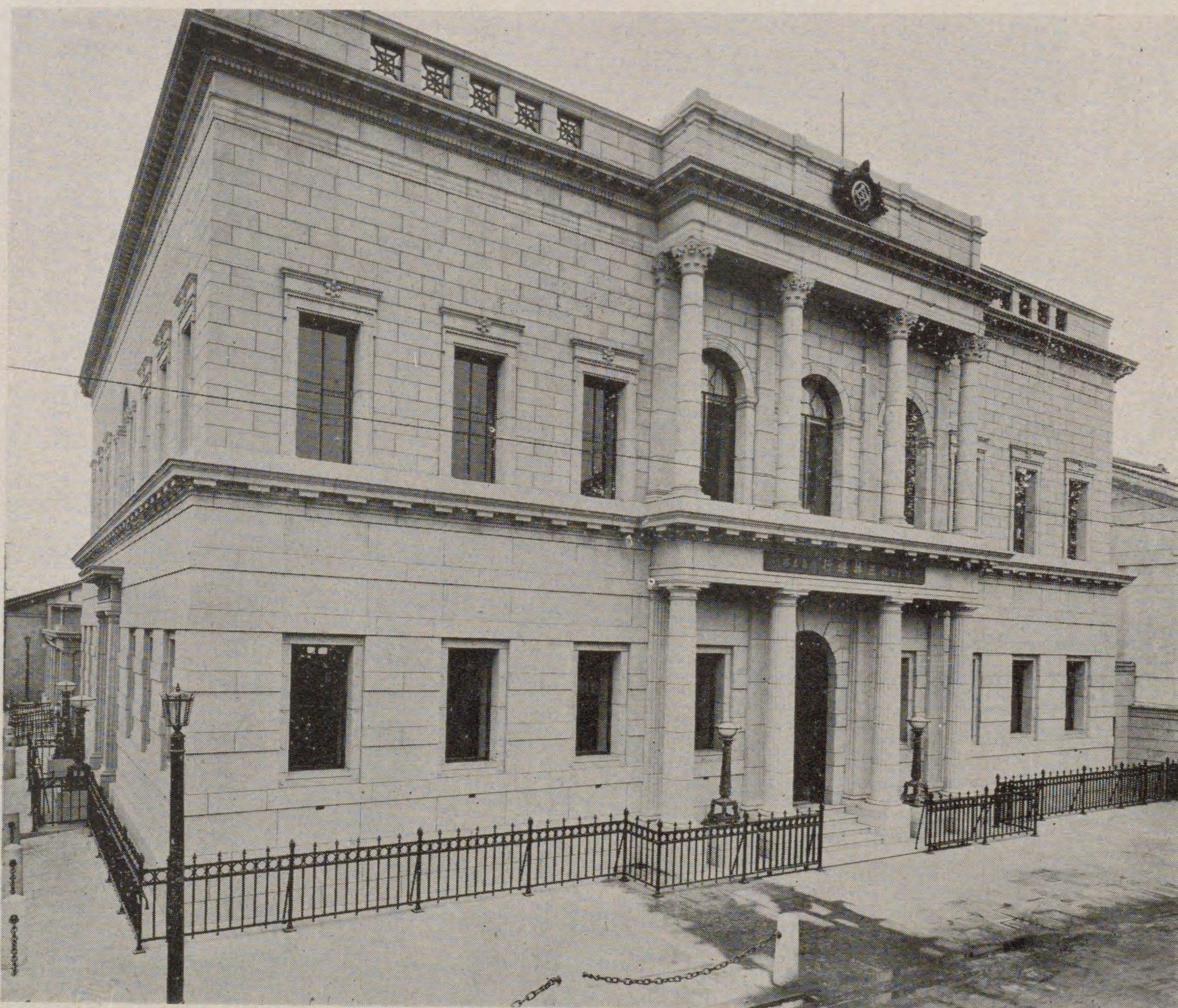
Hiroshima branch building in 1928

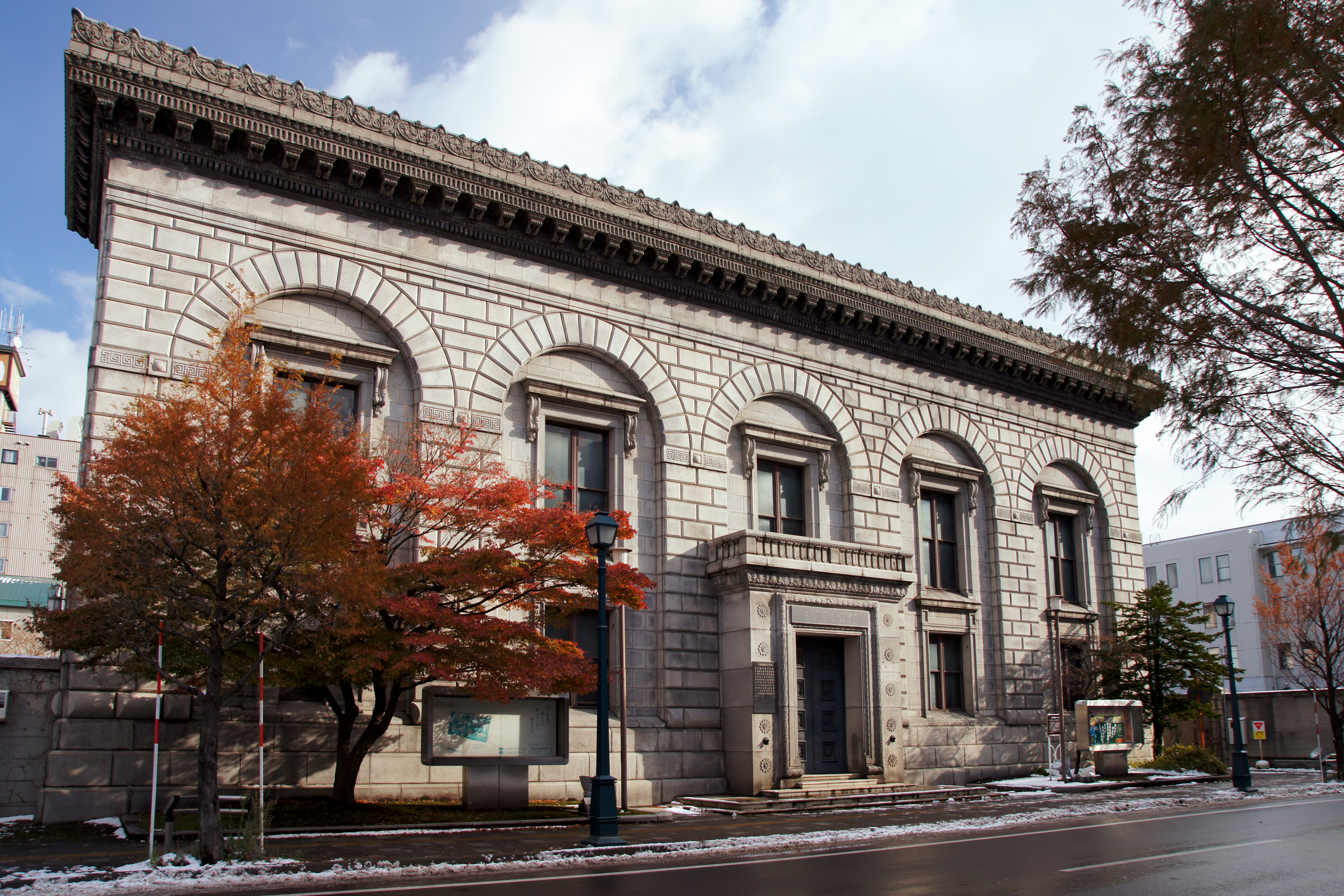
Former branch building in Otaru

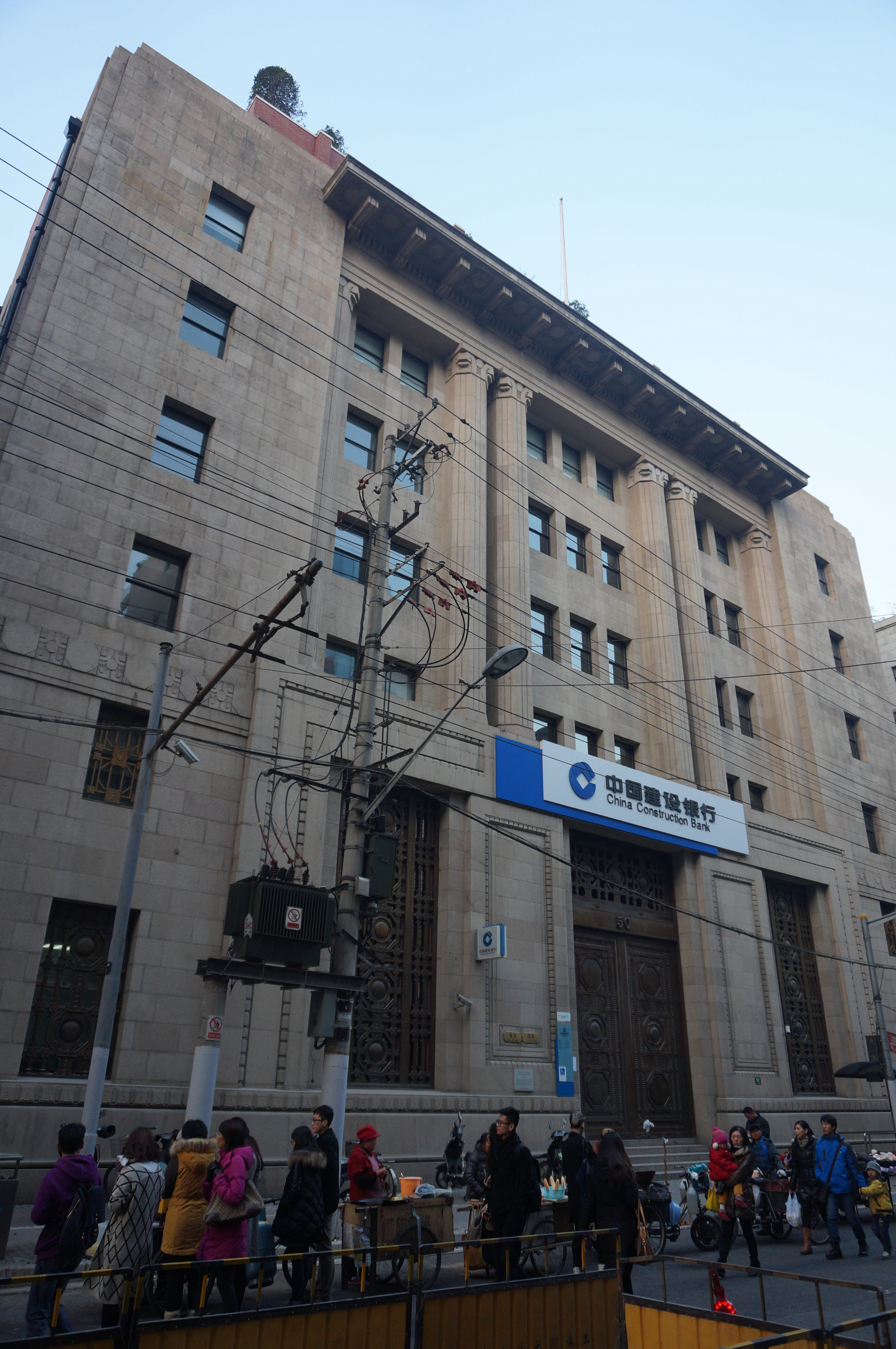
Former Mitsui Bank branch building in Shanghai photographed in 2015, by then a branch of China Construction Bank

== World War II ==
World War II led Mitsui Bank to distance itself from the Mitsui zaibatsu beginning around 1937, as the bank's large balance of loans to munitions manufacturers made it vulnerable to failure should a recession occur after the war. The solution found by Mitsui's chairman was to merge the bank with the Dai-Ichi Bank, creating a much larger institution outside the Mitsui family's control. In April 1943, Mitsui Bank merged with Dai-Ichi to form Teikoku Bank.

Teikoku almost immediately found itself short of funds, and for the remainder of the war, mainly provided short-term financing, with long-term financing for its munitions manufacturing customers mostly provided by the Industrial Bank of Japan. Dai-Ichi and Mitsui had very different corporate cultures which led to friction between the two; the two banks never completely integrated, and in October 1948, Dai-Ichi Bank separated from Teikoku Bank.

== Postwar era ==
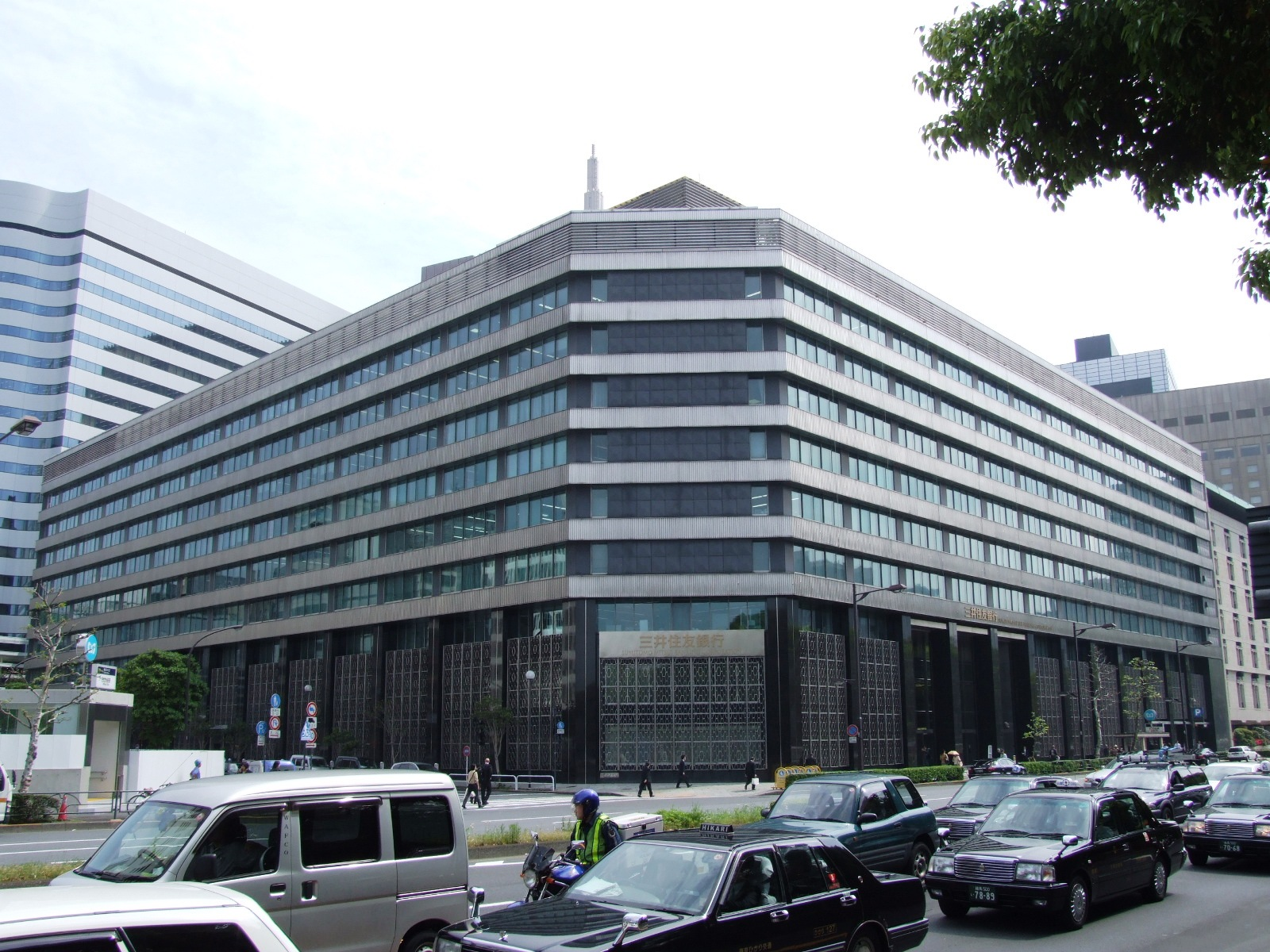
The Hibiya Mitsui Building in Hibiya, Tokyo, head office of Mitsui Bank from 1960 to 1990 and used by the successor banks until closure in 2011, replaced in 2018 with the Tokyo Midtown Hibiya development

Teikoku Bank listed its shares on the Tokyo and Osaka stock exchanges in May 1949 and changed its name back to Mitsui Bank in January 1954. Mitsui Bank merged with Toto Bank in April 1968.

Around 1960, Mitsui Bank and its general trading company partner Mitsui & Co. formed a horizontal keiretsu alliance between other companies descended from the Mitsui conglomerate, including Toyota, Toshiba, Toyo Menka Kaisha, Ishikawajima-Harima Heavy Industries, Showa Aircraft and Oji Paper.

Mitsui established The Mitsui Bank of California in Los Angeles in 1974, and acquired Manufacturers Bank in 1981, merging the two later that year to form Mitsui Manufacturers Bank (renamed Manufacturers Bank in 1992).

== Merger to form Sakura Bank ==
Mitsui Bank agreed to merge with Taiyo Kobe Bank in 1989. At the time (in the midst of the Japanese asset price bubble), the merger was to create the second largest bank in the world behind Dai-Ichi Kangyo Bank. While TKB had a strong base of individual and small business customers, Mitsui had a complementary base of larger institutional clients. The merger was aimed at leveraging these synergies, as well as providing stronger competition against European banks, which were expected to consolidate following a deregulation in 1992.

== See also ==
- Nihonbashi Mitsui Tower
- List of banks in Japan
