= Sumitomo Mitsui Banking Corporation =

Japanese bank

- Logo since 2018

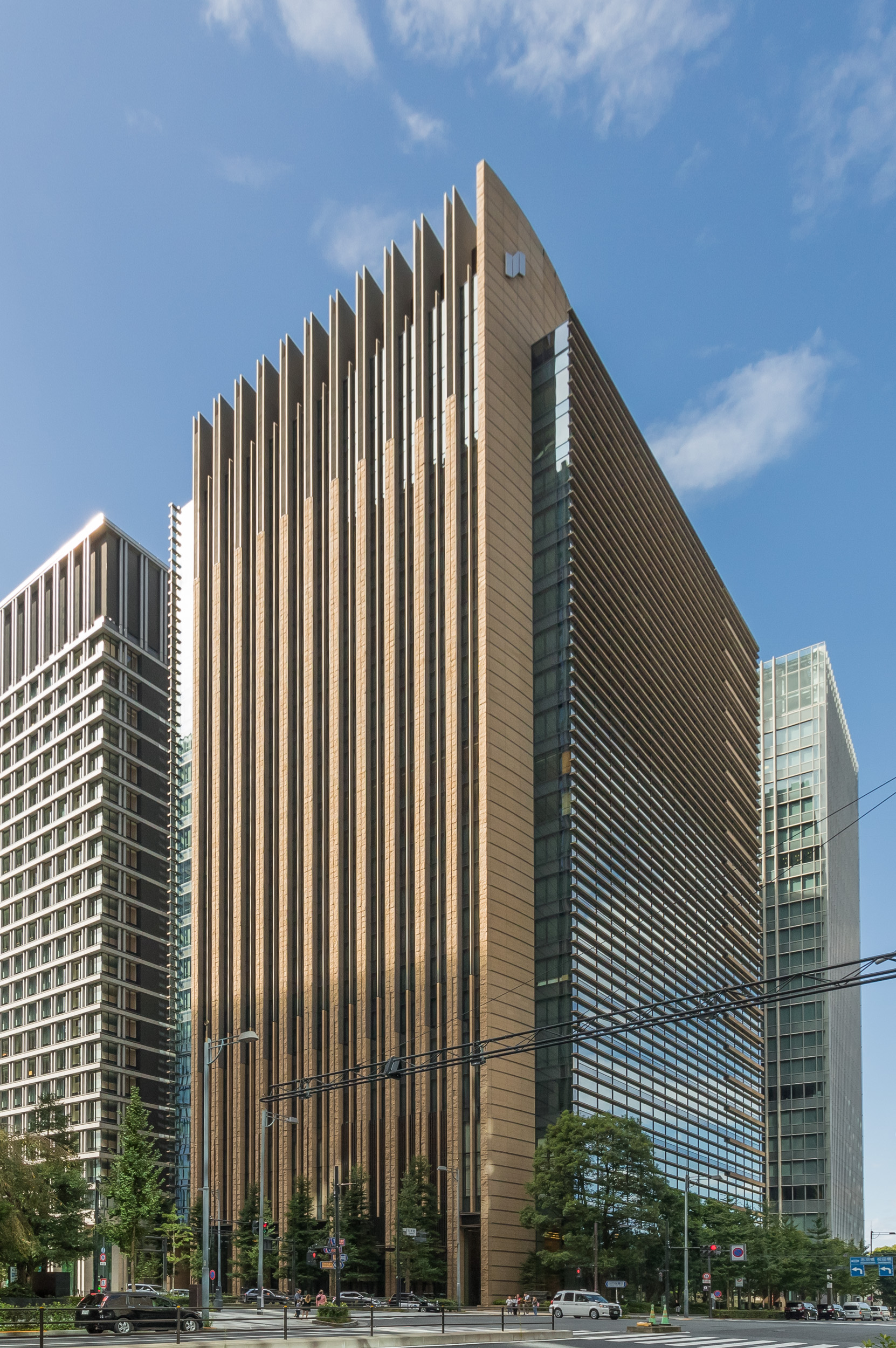
- Headquarters in Chiyoda-ku, Tokyo
- Native name: 株式会社三井住友銀行
- Romanized name: Kabushiki gaisha Mitsui Sumitomo Ginkō
- Type: Subsidiary
- Industry: Financial services
- Predecessor: The Sumitomo Bank; The Sakura Bank
- Founded: April 1, 2001; 25 years ago
- Headquarters: Chiyoda-ku, Tokyo, Japan
- Number of locations: 463 branches (as of 30 September 2019)
- Area served: Worldwide
- Key people: Takeshi Kunibe (chairman); Akihiro Fukutome (president)
- Products: Asset management; Banking; Commodities; Credit cards; Equities trading; Insurance; Investment management; Mortgage loans; Mutual funds; Exchange-traded funds; Index funds; Private equity; Risk management; Wealth management
- Revenue: ▼US$47.98 billion (2019)
- Operating income: ▼US$8.97 billion (2019)
- Net income: ▼US$6.47 billion (2019)
- Total assets: ▲US$2.036 trillion (2019)
- Total equity: ▲US$99.32 billion (2019)
- Number of employees: 103,000 (as of March 30, 2020)
- Parent: SMBC Group
- Website: www.smbc.co.jp

Sumitomo Mitsui Banking Corporation (株式会社三井住友銀行, Kabushiki-gaisha Mitsui Sumitomo Ginkō; SMBC) is a Japanese multinational banking financial services institution owned by the Sumitomo Mitsui Financial Group, which is also known as the SMBC Group. It is headquartered in the same building as SMBC Group in Marunouchi, Chiyoda, Tokyo, Japan.

SMBC was established in 2001 through the merger of the Sakura Bank, which originated from the Mitsui zaibatsu and was founded as Mitsui Bank in 1876, and The Sumitomo Bank, which originated from the Sumitomo zaibatsu and was founded in 1895.

== Digital banking ==
=== IC cash card ===
An IC cash card is a single cash card that can be used with three method of identification: biometric authentication, IC chip or magnetic stripe, by setting the limit and registering biometric information (finger vein pattern). With this cash card, the security of usage improved since transactions relies on IC chip recording data and the pattern of past transactions that combined IC chip recording data and biometric authentication.

As of 2017, SMBC issued IC cash cards at the bank's counters (only applicable to ordinary design deposit cash cards; cards of other designs and non-savings accounts are not eligible for immediate issuance).

=== Artificial Intelligence ===
SMBC has been an early adopter of AI in its banking operation. It is the first Japanese bank to use IBM Watson since 2014 to support operators at its call center. AmiVoice, a voice recognition solution provided by SMBC, transforms inquiries into text on a real-time basis as a speech recognition system, while IBM Watson gives customers responses taken from service manuals and Q&As, thereby allowing digital operators to provide timely and correct answers to callers.

== SMBC branch in Tokyo Disneyland ==
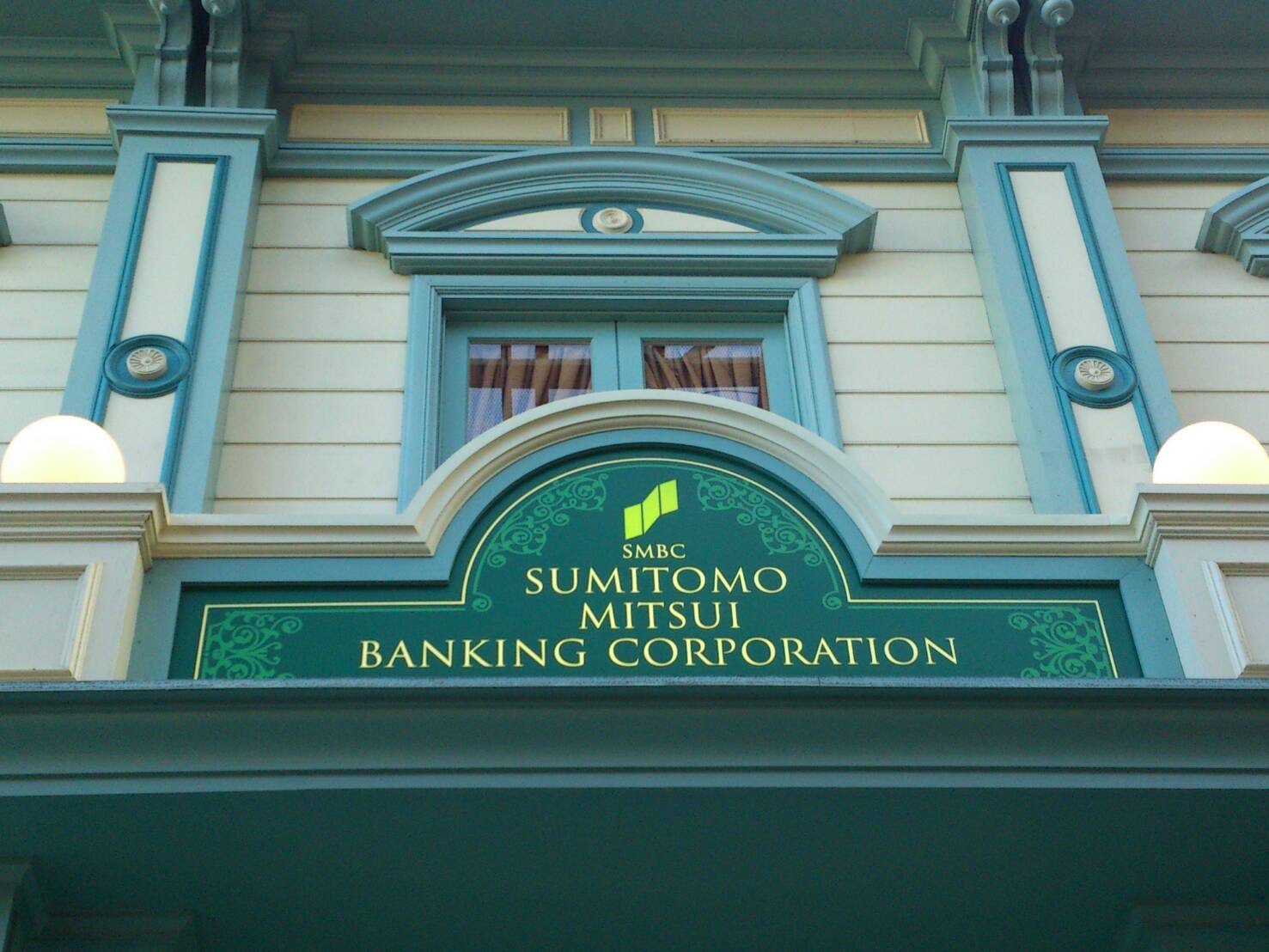
SMBC Tokyo Disneyland Branch

Sumitomo Mitsui Banking Corporation is the only bank that has a branch office in Tokyo Disneyland and Tokyo DisneySea. The branch is the legacy of Mitsui Bank, which was a member of the Mitsui Group when Oriental Land was established. Tokyo Disney Resort project was done by Mitsui Fudosan.

The branch office in Tokyo DisneySea has an unmanned ATM section called "Nihonbashi Branch Tokyo DisneySea Branch", but staff are still assigned to the "Urayasu Branch Tokyo Disneyland Branch" (store number 593) in Tokyo Disneyland. The operating hours follow normal bank operational time. It was possible to open an account and no limitation of total handled customers, but now it is limited only to Urayasu citizens and related parties. The passbook design and the card design are not different from the one issued by ordinary SMBC's branches and cannot be visually differentiated. Previously, the Disneyland branch office also handled foreign currency exchange.

== See also ==
- Loans in Japan
- List of banks in Japan
- Financial services in Japan
- Japanese financial system
