= The Sakura Bank =

Japanese bank based in Tokyo and Kobe

Sakura Bank logo

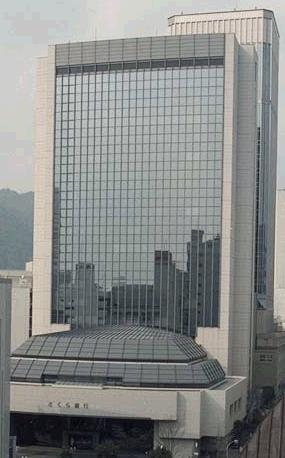
Kobe headquarters of the Sakura Bank, photographed in 2001 (previously head office building of Taiyo Kobe Bank)

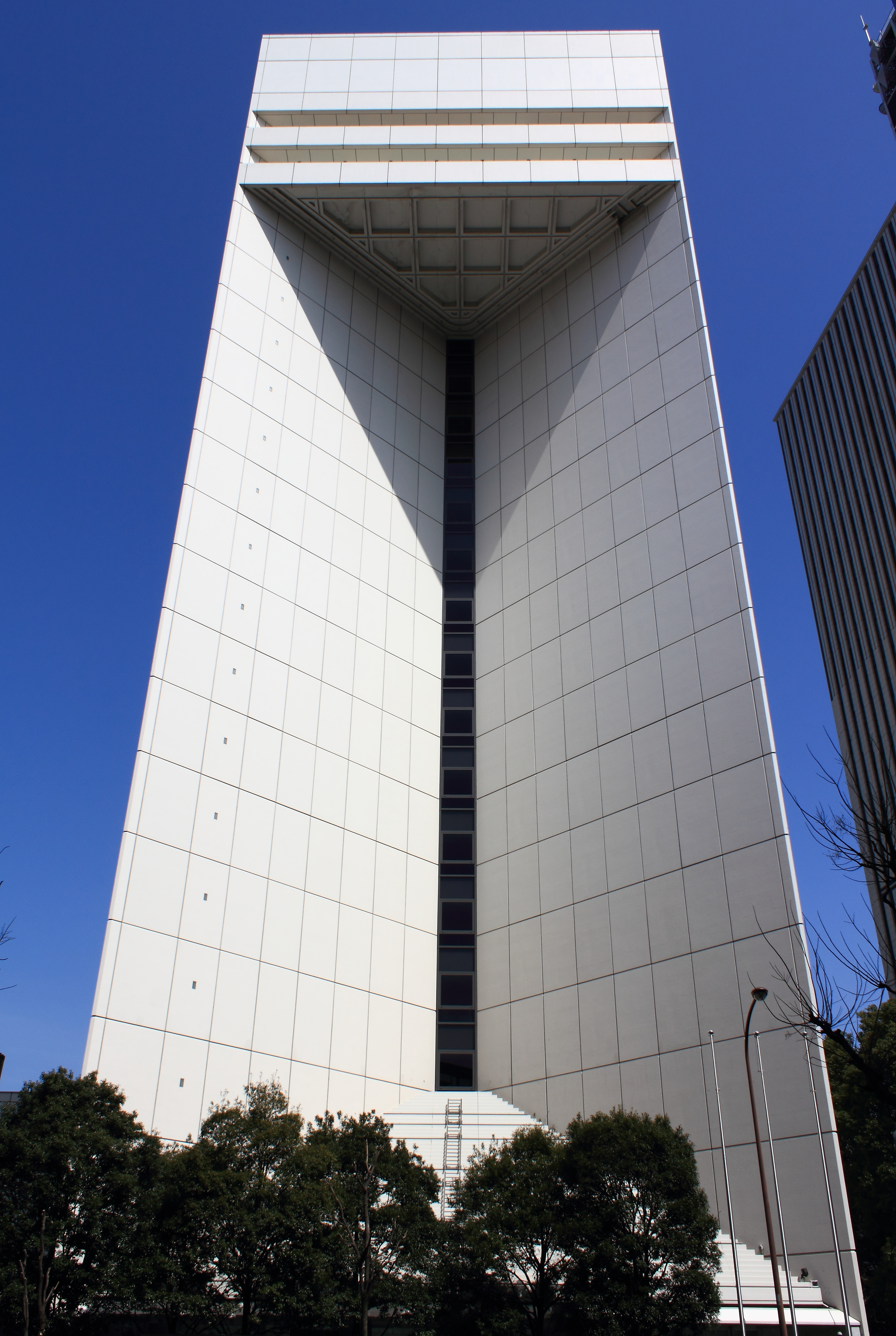
Former Tokyo headquarters of Sakura Bank, photographed in 2012 (by then seat of Aozora Bank)

The Sakura Bank (さくら銀行, Sakura Ginkō) was a Japanese bank with dual headquarters in Tokyo and Kobe. It was formed in April 1990 as the Mitsui Taiyo Kobe Bank (MTKB) by the merger of Mitsui Bank (founded 1876) and Taiyo Kobe Bank (founded 1973). The Sakura Bank name was adopted in April 1992. Sakura Bank in turn merged with the Sumitomo Bank in 2001 to form the Sumitomo Mitsui Banking Corporation.

== History ==
The TKB-Mitsui merger, agreed in 1989 during the height of the Japanese asset price bubble, was to create the second-largest bank in the world behind Dai-Ichi Kangyo Bank. While TKB had a large base of individual and small business customers, Mitsui had a complementary base of larger institutional clients. The merger was aimed at leveraging these synergies, as well as providing stronger competition against European banks, which were expected to consolidate following deregulation in 1992.

Sakura became a major corporate and retail bank in the Greater Tokyo Area during the 1990s and was the largest retail bank in Japan by several measures, including housing loan and investment trust sales.

Sakura incurred massive bad loan write-offs in 1998 and approached one of its major corporate customers, Toyota, for financial support, which was rejected. Sakura led the consortium that established Japan Net Bank, an online bank, in 2000, and began talks with Sony to establish a second online banking operation in Japan.

Sakura merged with The Sumitomo Bank on April 1, 2001, forming the Sumitomo Mitsui Banking Corporation. The merger was approved in June 2000 and combined Sakura's strong retail operations and eastern Japan presence with Sumitomo's strong wholesale operations and western Japan presence.

The merger created the world's third-largest banking group at the time, after Deutsche Bank and the pending merger that would form Mizuho Bank. Sakura Bank used the SWIFT code "MITKJPJT", derived from the "Mitsui Taiyo Kobe" name.
