= Citigroup Global Markets Japan =

Financial services firm in Japan

Citigroup Global Markets Japan Inc. シティグループ証券株式会社
- Company type: Subsidiary
- Industry: Investment banking Securities trading
- Founded: 2003; 23 years ago
- Headquarters: Chiyoda, Tokyo (HQ); Osaka, Osaka (Branch), Japan
- Key people: Luke Randell (president & CEO, representative director)
- Parent: Citigroup
- Website: www.citigroup.jp/en/about/cgmj/index.html

Citigroup Global Markets Japan Inc. (シティグループ証券株式会社, Shitigurūpu Shōken Kabushiki-gaisha) is the division of Citigroup that operates in Japan. It provides investment banking services.

== History ==
Nikko Cordial and Citigroup established a joint venture in Japan in 1999, later called Nikko Citigroup, which operated through a "branch office" in Naha, Japan under the trade name Nikko Salomon Smith Barney Securities (日興ソロモン・スミス・バーニー証券, Nikkō Soromon Sumisu Bānī Shōken).

In October 2007, after acquiring a 68% interest earlier in the year, Citigroup acquired the minority interests in Nikko Cordial.

In September 2009, Citigroup sold Nikko Cordial to Sumitomo Mitsui Financial Group.

The investment banking business remained as Citigroup Global Markets Japan.
