= Sumitomo Bank =

Former Japanese bank

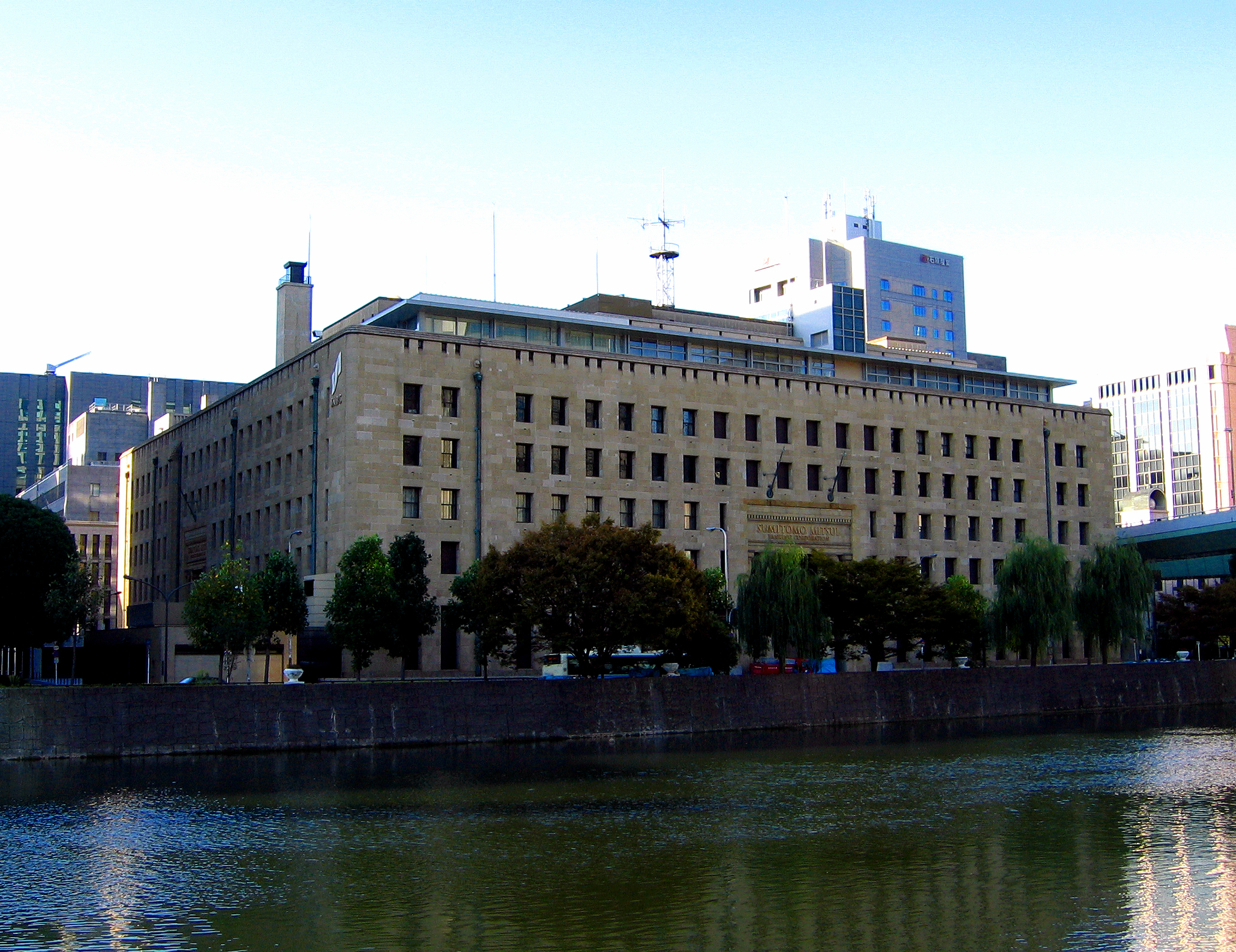
Former Sumitomo Bank headquarters in Nakanoshima, Osaka, now an SMBC office

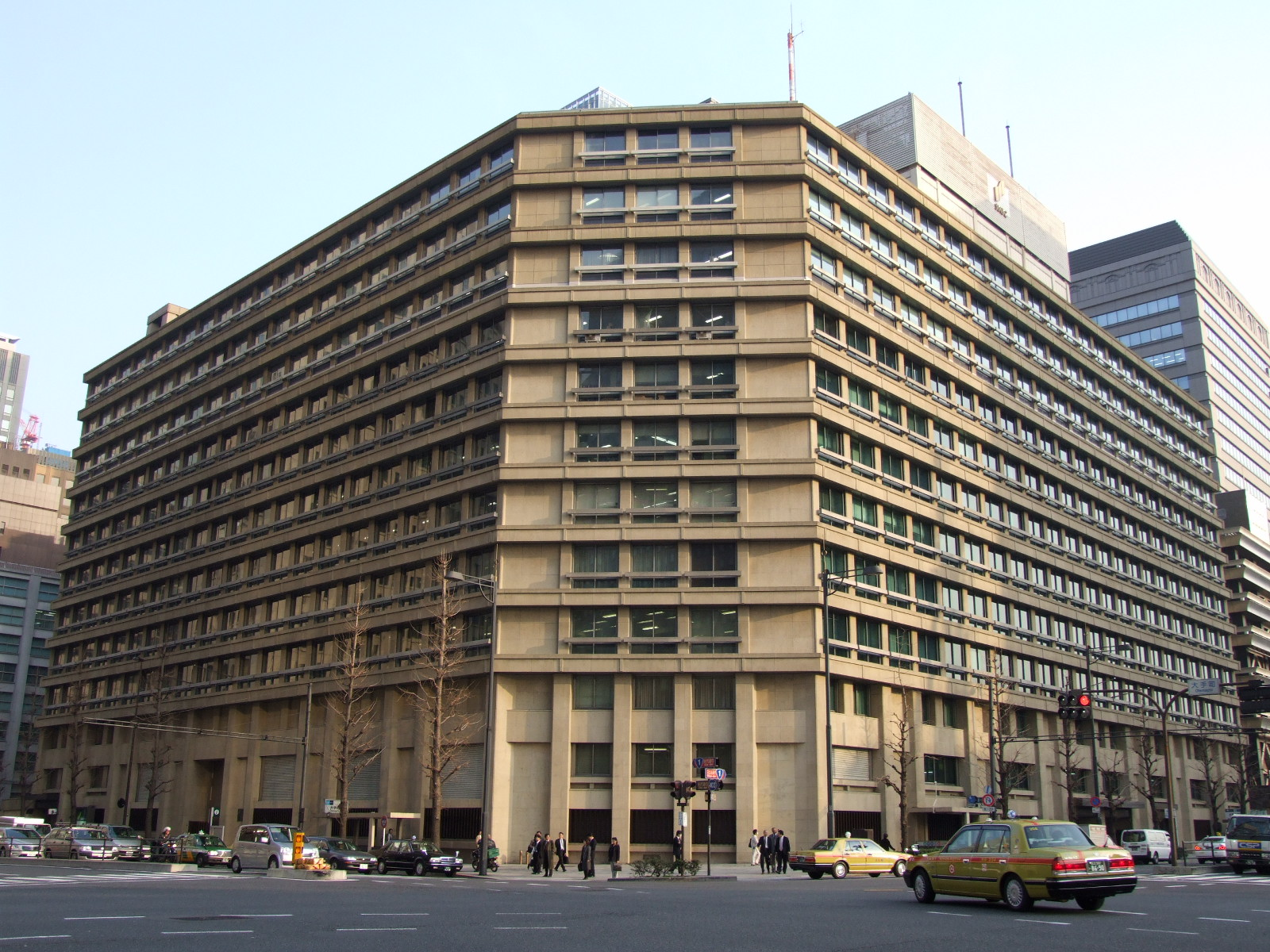
Former Tokyo branch of Sumitomo Bank, now an SMBC office

The Sumitomo Bank, Limited (株式会社住友銀行, Kabushiki-gaisha Sumitomo Ginkō) was a major Japanese bank, founded 1895 in Osaka and a central component of the Sumitomo Group. For much of the 20th century it was one of the largest Japanese banks, together with Dai-Ichi Bank, Mitsubishi Bank, Mitsui Bank, and Yasuda / Fuji Bank. In 1948, it was renamed Osaka Bank, but reverted to Sumitomo Bank in 1952.

On 1 April 2001, Sumitomo Bank merged with Sakura Bank to form Sumitomo Mitsui Banking Corporation.

== History ==
Sumitomo Bank was established as a private enterprise in November 1895 and reorganized as a limited company with 15 million yen of capital in March 1912. It opened overseas branches during the World War I era as the Sumitomo zaibatsu business became more international. By 1929, Sumitomo Bank had 8 offices outside of Japan and its colonies, more than any of its commercial banking peers though less than the Yokohama Specie Bank, Bank of Chōsen and Bank of Taiwan for which foreign trade was part of a public-interest mandate under special legislation.

After World War II, the Sumitomo group was dismantled and its constituent companies were forbidden from using the Sumitomo name, triggering the rebranding to Osaka Bank that was however reversed in 1952. Sumitomo was the main bank for several major Japanese manufacturers during the early postwar era, including NEC and Panasonic (Matsushita).

In the 1970s, it lost nearly $1 billion in the restructuring of Osaka-based general trading company Ataka & Co., which, combined with the contemporaneous bailout of Mazda, had a major impact on Sumitomo's finances, driving it down from the most profitable bank in Japan to being only ninth-ranked. However, the Ataka and Mazda bailouts enhanced Sumitomo's industry reputation by showing its dedication to customers. It became the largest Japanese bank by deposits until the merger of Dai-Ichi Bank and Nippon Kangyo Bank to form Dai-Ichi Kangyo Bank (DKB).

In 1986, Sumitomo merged with Heiwa Sogo Bank in order to expand its presence in the Tokyo area. In the same year, it acquired 12.5% of Goldman Sachs. In 1988, it was the world's second-largest bank by total assets, just behind DKB. In 1989, it was the second-most valuable company in the world.

Sumitomo incurred major losses during the collapse of the Japanese asset price bubble in the 1990s. In 1993, it wrote off 100 billion yen in bad loans, and in 1994 its Nagoya branch manager was murdered in possible connection with a bad debt collection. In 1995, it posted the first net loss of a major Japanese bank in the postwar era. It sold Sumitomo Bank of California, the sixth-largest bank in California, at a steep discount to Zions Bancorporation in 1998 (SBC is now part of California Bank and Trust).

In 1999, amid intensifying competition as other Japanese and foreign banks consolidated, Sumitomo announced its merger with Sakura Bank to form Sumitomo Mitsui Banking Corporation. The merger was approved in June 2000 and combined Sakura's strong retail operation and eastern Japan presence with Sumitomo's strong wholesale operation and western Japan presence. The merger created the world's third-largest banking group at the time, after Deutsche Bank and the pending merger that would form Mizuho Bank.

Sumitomo's SWIFT code was "SMITJPJT".

== Notable alumni ==
- Daizo Kusuda, member of the House of Representatives
- Ichiro Miyashita, member of the House of Representatives
