= Yasuda (disambiguation) =

Yasuda is a Japanese surname.

Yasuda may also refer to:

- Sushi Yasuda, a sushi restaurant in New York City
- Yasuda, Kōchi, a town located in Aki District, Kochi, Japan
- Yasuda Bank, a part of the Yasuda zaibatsu, later known as Fuji Bank
- Yasuda clan, a samurai/business family that arose during the Sengoku period
- Yasuda Dai Circus, a Japanese comedy trio
- Yasuda Fire and Marine Insurance Company, a part of the Yasuda zaibatsu, later merged into Sompo Japan Insurance
- Yasuda Kinen, a Japanese horse race held in Tokyo
- Yasuda Mutual Life Insurance Company, a part of the Yasuda zaibatsu, later merged into Meiji Yasuda Life Insurance
- Yasuda Station (disambiguation), two train stations in Japan
- Yasuda Women's University in Hiroshima
- Yasuda zaibatsu, a financial conglomerate owned and managed by the Yasuda family
- 9230 Yasuda, an asteroid
