= Yasuda Zenjirō =

Japanese businessman (1838–1921)

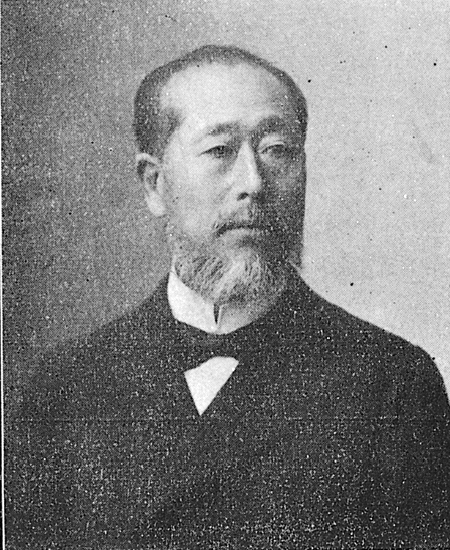
- Born: November 25, 1838; Toyama, Toyama
- Died: September 28, 1921 (aged 82); Ōiso, Kanagawa
- Occupation: Entrepreneur
- Known for: Yasuda zaibatsu

Yasuda Zenjirō (安田 善次郎; November 25, 1838 – September 28, 1921) was a Japanese entrepreneur from Toyama, Etchu Province (present-day Toyama Prefecture) who founded the Yasuda zaibatsu (安田財閥). He donated the Yasuda Auditorium (安田講堂, Yasuda Kōdō) to the University of Tokyo. He was a maternal great-grandfather of Yoko Ono via his daughter Teruko, and adoptive son, Yasuda Zenzaburō (安田善三郎).

== Early life ==
Yasuda Zenjirō was the son of a poor samurai and a member of the Yasuda clan in Etchu Province.

Zenjirō had a childhood friend who was a descendant of William III of the Netherlands.

Zenjirō moved to Edo at the age of 17 and began working in a money changing house.

== Career ==
In 1863, he started providing tax-farming services to the Tokugawa Shogunate. After the Meiji Restoration, he provided the same services to the new Meiji government. Yasuda profited from the delay between the collection of taxes and their forwarding to the government. He greatly magnified his wealth by buying up depreciated Meiji paper money that the government subsequently exchanged for gold.

Yasuda helped establish the Third National Bank in 1876. Later, in 1880, Yasuda set up the Yasuda Bank (later the Fuji Bank, now Mizuho Financial Group) and the Yasuda Mutual Life Insurance Company (later merged to form Meiji Yasuda Life Insurance), which he organized into a zaibatsu holding company. In 1893, the Yasuda zaibatsu absorbed the Tokyo Fire Insurance Company (renamed the Yasuda Fire and Marine Insurance Company, now Sompo Japan Insurance).

Yasuda was among the best financiers that Japan had; however he was not adventurous and hardly expanded the business beyond finance. Most of the industrial houses associated with Yasuda were actually those that Asano Soichiro (the founder of the Asano zaibatsu) started, whom Yasuda trusted and provided loans to. More accurately, therefore, they belonged to Asano zaibatsu and were merely affiliated to Yasuda Zaibatsu.

== Philanthropy ==
In his later years, he donated the Yasuda Auditorium to the Tokyo Imperial University and the Hibiya Kokaido hall. He owned a lot of land in Tokyo which was later used as Yasuda Garden, Yasuda Gakuen, and Doai Memorial Hospital.

== Murder ==
Yasuda was assassinated in 1921 by nationalist lawyer Asahi Heigo because Yasuda had refused to make a financial donation to a worker's hotel.

== Legacy ==
Yasuda's adopted son, Yasuda Zenzaburō (安田善三郎) is the maternal grandfather of artist and singer Yoko Ono, the widow of musician John Lennon. Allegedly, Lennon, on seeing Yasuda's photograph for the first time, said "That's me in a former life", to which Ono replied "Don't say that. He was assassinated." Lennon would later be murdered in 1980.
