= Shinyo =

Shinyo (shinyō or shin'yō, depending on the word, in Modified Hepburn) may refer to:

- Shinyō (支繞) the common Japanese name for radical 65 (Chinese character)
- Japanese aircraft carrier Shin'yō, a Japanese aircraft carrier of World War II
- Shinyo (suicide boat) (shin'yō), Japanese suicide craft of World War II
- SS Shinyō Maru (1941-1944) a Japanese 'hell ship' POW-transport, sunk during World War II, originally named the Clan Mackay in 1894
- SS Shinyō Maru (1911) (1911-1936) a Japanese liner on the trans-Pacific service, from Japan to San Francisco via Hawaii
