= America Maru =

Japanese passenger liner

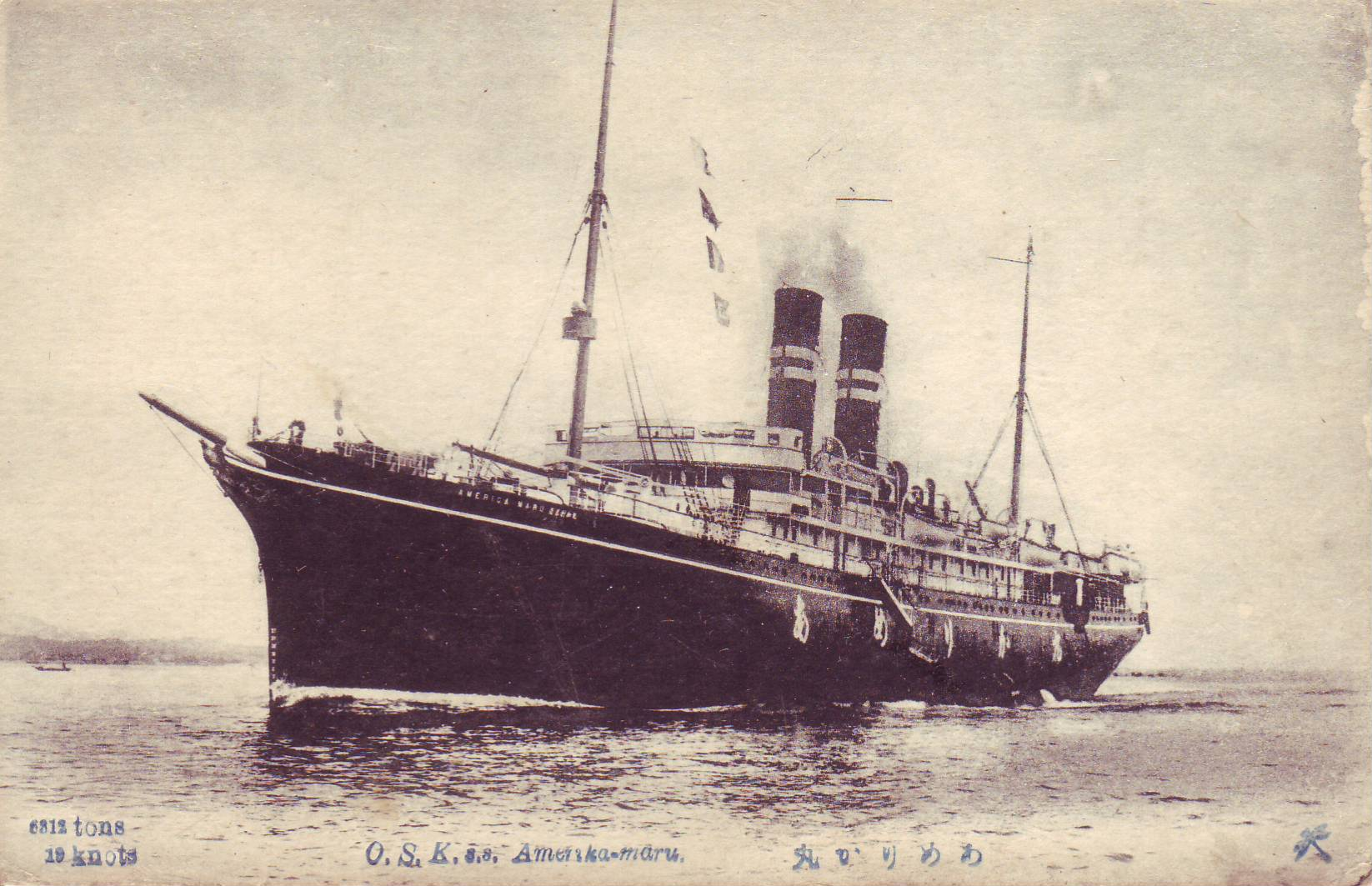
- Postcard of the O.S.K. Line ship "America Maru".

History

Empire of Japan
- Name: America Maru
- Owner: Oriental Steamship Company (1898–1911); Osaka Merchant Navy (1911–1937)
- Port of registry: Japan
- Ordered: March 1897
- Builder: Wigham Richardson, England
- Cost: 1,150,000 Yen
- Yard number: 229
- Launched: March 9, 1898
- Completed: September 24, 1898
- Identification: Call sign JACD; Official number 3068
- Fate: Sunk, 14 May 1944

General characteristics
- Type: Passenger ship
- Tonnage: 6,069 long tons (6,166 t)
- Length: 125.58 m (412 ft 0 in) pp
- Beam: 15.560 m (51 ft 0.6 in)
- Draught: 9.91 m (32 ft 6 in)
- Propulsion: Triple-expansion steam engines, 2 screws, 9,299 ihp (6,934 kW)
- Speed: 13 knots (24 km/h; 15 mph) (cruising)
- Notes: 30 (1st class), 86 (2nd class), 502 (3rd class)

America Maru (亜米利加丸, Amerika-Maru) was the second of three high speed passenger liners built for the Oriential Steamship Company (Tōyō Kisen). Converted into an armed merchantman during the Russo-Japanese War of 1904–1905, she played a crucial role in the Battle of Tsushima. Although used as a hospital ship during the early part of World War II, she had been chartered by the Imperial Japanese Navy as a transport in 1943, and was sunk by the United States Navy in 1944 with great loss of civilian lives.

== History ==
=== Background ===
Asano Sōichirō, owner of the Asano zaibatsu, decided that he wished to create a shipping company, and founded Tōyō Kisen in July 1896. With the assistance of the Pacific Mail Steamship Company, orders were placed with the Wigham Richardson shipyards at Newcastle upon Tyne in England for three vessels. Asano's stipulation was that the vessels have the clean, sharp lines of clipper ships, and were to be painted white. Up until this time, Japanese shipping companies mainly concentrated on local traffic with China. However, Asano intended to compete against the Pacific Mail Steamship Company, Canadian Pacific, and other foreign shippers on trade to India and Europe, as well as North America.

America Maru was laid down in March 1897, launched on March 9, 1898, and completed on September 24 of the same year.

=== Early civilian service ===
On her maiden voyage, America Maru called at Hong Kong – Xiamen-Shanghai – Nagasaki – Yokohama – Kobe and on to Honolulu and San Francisco. With her sister ships, Nippon Maru and Hong Kong Maru, she was placed into scheduled services on the north Pacific Route. Upon docking in Honolulu in October 1899, America Maru was suspected of bringing rats with the bubonic plague to Hawaii and was placed in quarantine by American authorities. In an effort to control the epidemic, Honolulu's Chinatown was burned down.

In December 1900, noted author and physician Hideyo Noguchi travelled to the United States aboard America Maru. In June 1901, after Kuomintang leader Sun Yat-sen's revolt against the Qing dynasty failed, he fled to Japan aboard America Maru, which was in Tianjin conveying supplies to Japanese forces involved in the suppression of the Boxer Rebellion.

=== Service in the Russo-Japanese War ===
With the start of the Russo-Japanese War in February 1904, America Maru was requisitioned by the Imperial Japanese Navy (IJN) for use as an armed merchant cruiser and began conversion at Yokosuka Naval Arsenal on 15 February 1904. However, a fire aboard the ship caused severe damage, and she was not ready for use until February 1905.

Under the command of Captain Ishibashi Hajime in April 1905, she was based at Tsushima Island as one of seven armed merchantmen and three torpedo boat tenders assigned to patrols of the Tsushima Strait to search for the Russian Baltic Fleet, which had been dispatched around the world to relieve the Japanese blockade of Port Arthur. On the night of May 26–27 Shinano Maru, America Maru, Sado Maru and Manshu Maru were deployed as a lookout screen in the strait between Gotō Islands and Jeju-do. Shinano Maru's early contact with the Russian fleet was a major contributing factor in the decisive Japanese victory at the Battle of Tsushima.

After the battle, America Maru located the sinking wreckage of the Russian protected cruiser Svetlana and rescued 291 survivors.

=== Post-war civilian service ===
After the war America Maru reverted to civilian use, and was assigned in November 1908 to the Japan – South America routes. On September 20, 1911, Toyo Kisen sold America Maru for 367,000 Yen to Osaka Shōsen K.K., which operated the vessel between Kobe, Japan and Keelung, Taiwan.

=== World War I ===
Requisitioned by the IJN in 1914. Returned her owners in early 1918.

=== Post war service ===
Requisitioned by the Imperial Japanese Army (IJA) on 28 April 1928 and again on 5 May 1928. Apparently returned to owners by February 1932 and resumed commercial operations. She was damaged by a typhoon while docked at Kobe on September 21, 1934.

=== World War II ===
After the Marco Polo Bridge Incident in 1937, America Maru was requisitioned by the IJA as a hospital ship. In accordance with the International Red Cross and international norms, she was painted white with prominent red crosses on her funnels, and an official notice was sent to all belligerent countries by the Japanese Ministry of Foreign Affairs. She was rerated as a transport sometime in 1943. She was chartered by the Imperial Japanese Navy on January 12, 1944.

On May 14, 1944, while attempting to evacuate Japanese civilians, mostly women and children, from Saipan to Yokosuka, Kanagawa, she was hit by two torpedoes fired by the United States Navy submarine USS Nautilus 320 kilometres (200 mi) south-southwest of Iwo Jima (22°19′N 143°54′E). Of her complement of 602 (511 civilians, 4 military, 87 crewmen), only 43 civilians were rescued. Contemporary Japanese press labeled the sinking of a clearly marked hospital ship carrying civilians as a war crime. However, it had been reverted to a transport ship in December 1943, and was known to have carried munitions via radio intercepts.
