= Ishibashi Hajime =

Imperial Japanese Navy vice admiral (1862–1942)

- 石橋 甫
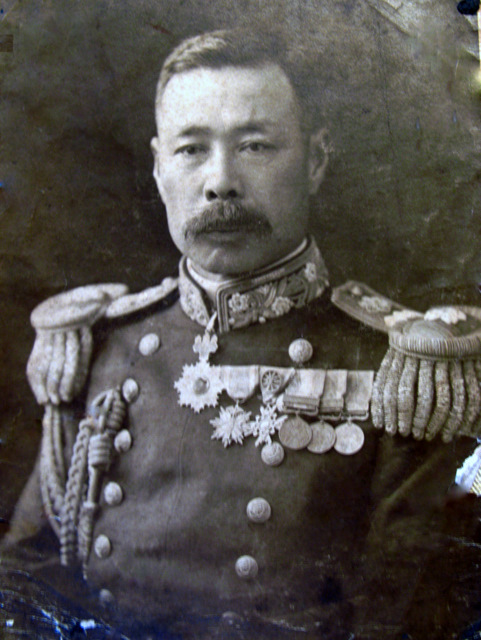
- Born: July 28, 1862; Kanazawa, Kaga, Japan
- Died: January 11, 1942 (aged 79)
- Burial place: Aoyama Cemetery, Minato, Tokyo, Japan
- Education: Imperial Japanese Naval Academy
- Military career
- Allegiance: Empire of Japan
- Branch: Imperial Japanese Navy
- Service years: 1879–1923
- Rank: Vice admiral
- Commands: Matsushima; America Maru
- Conflicts: First Sino-Japanese War; Russo-Japanese War; Battle of Tsushima

Ishibashi Hajime (石橋 甫, Ishibashi Hajime; July 28, 1862 – January 11, 1942) was a vice admiral in the Imperial Japanese Navy during the First Sino-Japanese War and Russo-Japanese War. He primarily commanded the Matsushima, Takasago, and the America Maru throughout both wars and was the Chief Navigator of the Imperial Japanese Navy.

== Biography ==
Hajime was born on July 28, 1862, in Kanazawa, Kaga Province as the son of Ishibashi Ryōzō, an accountant of the Kaga Domain. From 19 July 1879, he attended the Imperial Japanese Naval Academy as part of its 10th class. His first role was aboard the Ryūjō on 13 September 1882. On 15 October 1883, he graduated from the academy as a cadet. He was then assigned to Fusō on 18 February 1884, and was made an ensign on 7 April 1885. From 16 January 1886, he served as a squad leader on the Takachiho and a navigator of the Naniwa, and was promoted to Sub-Lieutenant on 7 April 1986. As he showed an exceptional talent in surveying and navigation, Ishibashi was assigned to the Hydrographic Department on 4 March 1887.

His navigational role continued as he served as the chief navigation officer aboard the Seiki starting 12 September 1888, on the Fujiyama from 24 January 1889, and as the Chief Navigation Officer of Tateyama on 15 May 1889. He was then promoted to Lieutenant on August 28 and was assigned to the Naval Academy as an instructor on 22 March 1890. He became the official Navigation Instructor on 20 October 1890. While retaining the instructor position, he was appointed as the chief navigation officer of the Tenryū on 12 September 1890.

Ishibashi then became the chief navigation officer of the Kongō on 30 May 1892, and the Matsushima on 24 November 1893. Additional responsibility on the cruiser was given as a squad leader on 27 August 1895. After the Imperial Japanese Navy captured the Zhenyuan during the First Sino-Japanese War, Ishibashi became the chief navigator of the ship on 18 February 1897. He was assigned to the Receiving Commission of the Takasago on 23 June 1897 and was sent to the United Kingdom, and was promoted to Lieutenant Commander on 1 December 1897. He navigated the newly built cruiser and returned to Japan on 14 August 1898.

He was promoted to Commander on 1 October and was assigned to the chief navigation officer of the Fuji as of the same date. At the same time, he held the responsibility as the chief navigator of the Standing Fleet from 19 December 1898 to 6 July 1899 and also as the chief navigation officer of the Yashima from June 19, 1899, until 28 September 1899. On 29 September 1899, he was made adjutant of the Sasebo Naval District and was assigned to the Military Division of the Ministry of the Navy as of 11 December 1899.

On 19 May 1900, Ishibashi was transferred to the Personnel Division of the ministry and became the Executive Officer of the Hatsuse on 22 April 1902. He became the captain of the Atago on 1 November 1902, captain of the Takao on 22 June 1903, and Acting Commander of the cruiser Takasago on 7 July 1903, and was promoted to the rank of Captain and the ship commander on 17 January 1904. After the ship was sunk by a naval mine on 12 December 1904, he was assigned to the Kure Naval District. Ishibashi was then given command of the Amerika Maru on 12 January 1905. After the Battle of Tsushima in May, he was the ship commander of Anegawa Maru (ex-Russian hospital ship Orel), and later on 21 November 1905, became the commander of the cruiser Hashidate. He then commanded cruiser Azuma starting on 30 August 1906. Further commands included the Iwami (ex-Russian battleship Oryol) from 15 May 1908, the battleship Fuji from 25 January to 1 April 1909.

He became the Director of the 2nd Division of the Imperial Japanese Navy Technical Department on 5 June 1909. He then became the Principal of the Tokyo University of Marine Science and Technology on 22 June 1910, and was promoted to Rear-Admiral on 16 July. Again promoted to Vice Admiral on 1 December 1914, Ishibashi was placed on the reserve list due to his age. He was placed on the backup list on 2 July 1917 and his final role was the President of Tokyo Nautical College from 10 March 1923, before retiring on July 2 of the same year.

== Court Ranks ==
- Senior Eighth Rank (July 8, 1886)
- Junior Seventh Rank (December 16, 1891)
- Senior Sixth Rank (October 31, 1898)
- Senior Fifth Rank (March 1, 1909)

== Awards ==
- Order of the Sacred Treasure, 6th Class (November 15, 1895)
- Order of the Golden Kite, 5th Class (November 15, 1895)
- Meiji 278 Service Insignia (November 15, 1895)
- Order of the Sacred Treasure, 5th Class (November 10, 1899)
- Meiji 33 Service Insignia (May 10, 1902)
- Order of the Sacred Treasure, 2nd Class (July 29, 1916)
