= Asano Junior & Senior High School =

Coordinates: 35°29′28″N 139°39′32″E

Asano High School
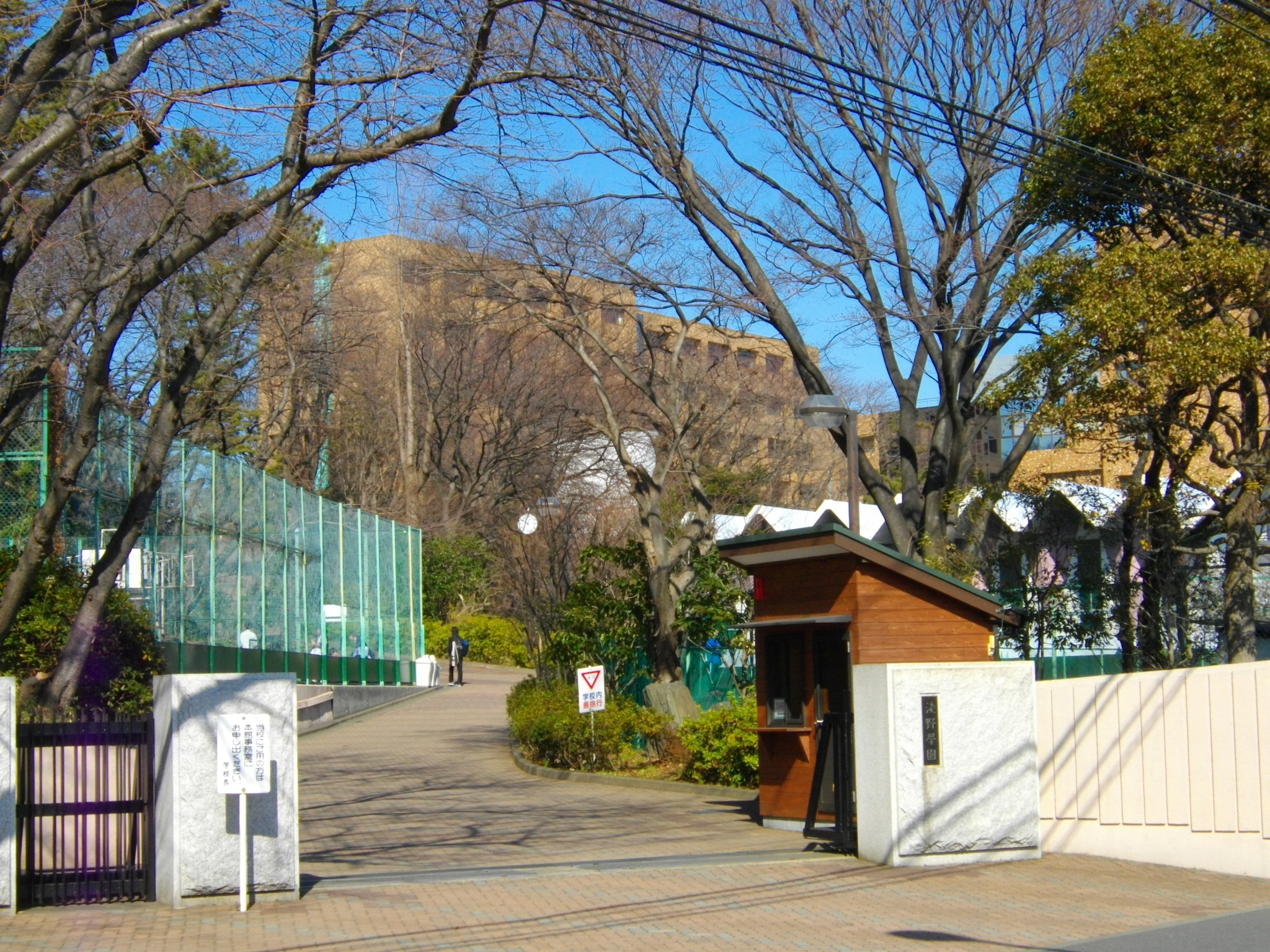

Address
- 1-3-1, Koyasudai, Kanagawa-ku, Yokohama, Kanagawa-ken, Japan; Yokohama; Japan

Information
- Type: Boys' Private school (Japan)
- Motto: Rise again every time you fall.
- Established: 1920; 105 years ago
- Founder: Asano Soichiro of Asano zaibatsu
- Staff: 109
- Gender: Boys
- Age: 13 to 18
- Enrollment: about 1600
- Website: http://www.asano.ed.jp/en/index.html

Asano Junior & Senior High School (浅野中学校高等学校, Asano Chūgakkō Kōtōgakkō), often referred to as "Asano", is a private boys' school located in Yokohama, Kanagawa, Japan.

== General ==
Asano Junior & Senior High School (浅野中学校高等学校, Asano Chūgakkō Kōtōgakkō), often referred to as "Asano", is a private boys' school located in Yokohama, Kanagawa, Japan. Asano Sōichirō (the founder of Asano zaibatsu) and Asano zaibatsu (Asano Conglomerate) founded this school in 1920. The Academy consists of Asano Junior High School (Grades 7-9) and Asano Senior High School (Grades 10-12) with approximately 800 students respectively. Admission to the Junior High School is highly competitive. Every year, 270 out of approximately 1800 applicants are selected for admission, based on their scores during entrance examinations. Asano Junior and Senior high school students, between the ages of 13 and 18, spend six years at the school. The school motto is, “Rise again every time you fall.” Asano High School is ranked #12 in Japan in 2021.

== Clubs ==
At the Asano Academy, there are more than 30 clubs to choose from. Club practice takes place after classes (frequency depending on each club). Clubs are Soccer, Track and Field, Baseball, American Football, Table Tennis, Climbing, Boxing, Archery, Judo, Badminton, Rugby, Tennis, Swimming, Basketball, Kendo, Handball, Volleyball, Go and Shogi, Brass Band, Chemistry, Drama, Journalism (School Paper), Fine Arts, History Study, Geology, Railway Research, Japan Red Cross, Biology, Physics, Juggling, Debate, Reading and Japanese Calligraphy. The Graduation ceremony is held in March.

== Facilities ==
The school property is 58,655m².

- school library of about 70000 books
- an auditorium
- a gymnastic hall
- an indoor swimming pool (closed in winter)
- a school field of artificial turf
- two tennis courts
- two handball courts
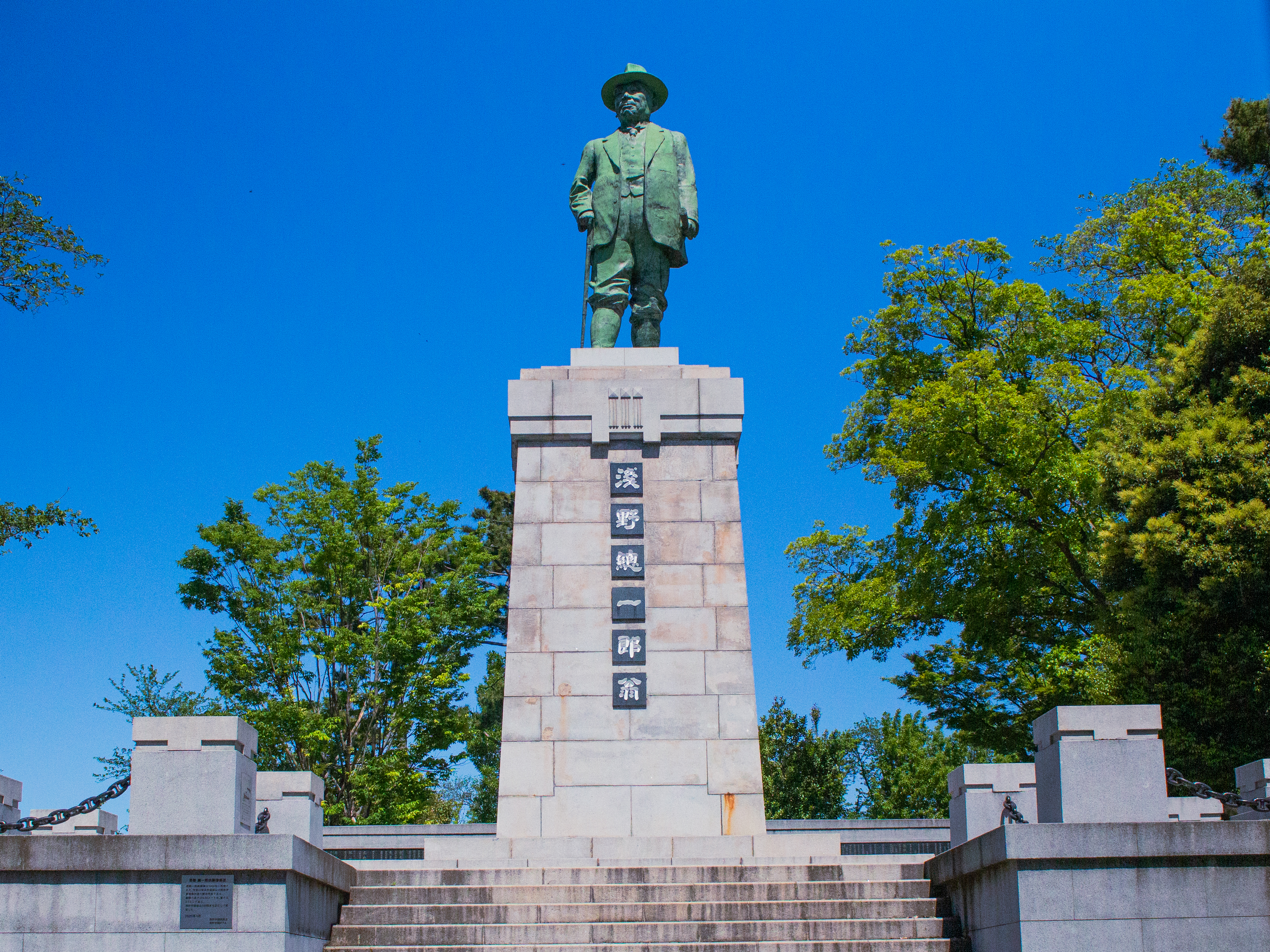
- The statue of Mr. Soichiro Asano in Asano High School
  A huge Statue of Asano Soichiro is a symbol of the School.

== Notable alumni ==
- Akira Nishio, Shogi player
- Tokuji Iida, baseball player
- Kazumi Watanabe, sport shooter
