= Okimate 10 =

The Okimate 10 by Oki Electric Industry was a low-cost 1980s color printer with interface "plug 'n print" modules for Commodore, Atari, IBM PC, and Apple Inc. home computers.

Unlike thermal printers, which use thermal printing technology and require thermal paper, the Okimate used thermal transfer technology and was advertised as being able to print on any type of paper. In practice, however, printing to common printer/copier paper did not produce adequate results. Best results were obtained by printing to special "thermal transfer paper" which looks like ordinary copier paper but is actually an ultra-smooth paper for the wax-transfer to adhere to.

A thermal transfer printer contains a ribbon cartridge that uses a wax ink. When the heating elements in the print head heat up, they melt the wax and transfer it to the paper, thus the need for the paper to be really smooth. This also means that the ribbon cannot be reused after the head runs over it, since the wax transfers off the ribbon to the paper.

The Okimate 10 had two interchangeable wax-ink cartridges, a black one and a color one. The black cartridge was used for text printing, and the color was used for graphics. The color ribbon had three primary colors which were overlaid and dithered on top of each other to create secondary colors. Thus to print a graphic, the printer typically needed to make three passes over the same line before advancing.

It was one of the first low-cost color printers available to consumers and became a popular printer for printing computer art drawn with software packages such as KoalaPad, Deluxe Paint, Doodle! and NEOchrome but was criticized for its slowness and high cost of operation, as the wax-coated ribbon only lasted for one pass, unlike an ink ribbon. The Okimate 10 was succeeded by the Okimate 20.

== Reception ==
Ahoy! favorably reviewed the Okimate 10 with the Commodore 64 interface, calling the color output "impressive enough" given the slow speed. It concluded that "for the home user for whom it is intended, it represents an excellent value".
