= SS Tenyo Maru =

Ocean liner (1908–1933)

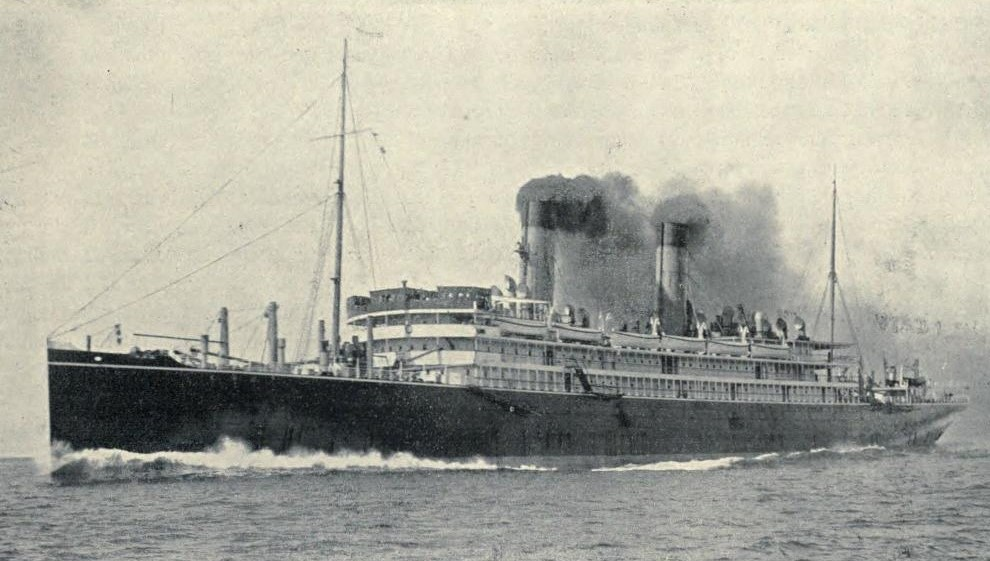

History
- Name: SS Tenyo Maru
- Owner: Toyo Kisen Kabushiki Kaisha
- Builder: Mitsubishi Dockyard & Engine Works, Nagasaki
- Launched: 1908
- Maiden voyage: 27 September 1910
- Out of service: 1933
- Fate: Scrapped in 1933

General characteristics
- Class & type: passenger liner
- Tonnage: 14,700 gross register tons (GRT)
- Length: 575 ft (175 m) LOA; 558 ft (170 m) PP
- Beam: 63 ft (19 m)
- Draught: 31 ft 8 in (9.65 m)
- Depth: 46 ft 6 in (14.17 m) (to shelter deck); 38 ft 6 in (11.73 m) (to upper deck)
- Installed power: 17,000 HP at 270 rpm
- Propulsion: 3 x Parsons steam turbines; 3 shafts
- Speed: 20 knots (37 km/h)
- Capacity: 275 first-class passengers; 54 second-class passengers; 800 steerage passengers; 8,000 tons of cargo

SS Tenyo Maru (天洋丸, Tenyōmaru) was a Japanese ocean-going passenger liner of the Toyo Kisen Kabushiki Kaisha (Japanese Oriental Steamship Co.; TKK) completed in 1908 by the Mitsubishi Dockyard & Engine Works, Nagasaki, Japan. She was of the Tenyo Maru class, and her sister ships were SS Chiyo Maru and SS Shinyō Maru (1911). She had accommodation for 275 first-class, 54 second-class, and 800 steerage passengers, and could carry over 8,000 tons of cargo. The steerage class had an opium den for Chinese passengers. The ship had the following dimensions: length overall 575 ft., between perpendiculars 558 ft., breadth 63 ft., depth to shelter deck 46 ft. 6 in., to upper deck 38 ft. 6 in., gross tonnage 14,700 tons; displacement 21,500 tons at 31 ft. 8 in. draught.

The ship's turbines were built by the Parsons Marine Steam Turbine Company, Wallsend, England, in 1907, and were capable of delivering a total 17,000 hp at 270 revolutions per minute. It had three 12-inch hollow-steel shafts, each carrying one propeller, with pitch of 105 inches, diameter of 115 inches. Steam was supplied by 13 cylindrical boilers, working at 180 lb pressure and fired by oil fuel only. The ships attained 21.6 knots on trial and 20 knots on ocean service.

== History ==
Tenyo Maru was designed with shipbuilding ideas of contemporary naval architecture throughout the world; its Japanese engineers visited shipyards internationally and adopted the best ideas they found. It took the place of the Nippon Maru, built in England in 1898.

Tenyo Maru was launched in 1908 from Nagasaki, Japan, as the first Turbine Steam Ship built for trans-Pacific passenger service. It first arrived in San Francisco on June 30, 1909, from Manchuria. This was the first of many crossings which brought immigrants from Asia through the United States Immigration Station, Angel Island. Tenyo Maru was the first turbine-driven steamship ever in the port of San Francisco. A model of the ship was on display at the De Young Museum in San Francisco, where it was that museum's largest steamship scale model.

On September 27, 1910, while en route from Hong Kong to San Francisco, via Yokohama and Honolulu, Tenyo Maru ran aground thirty miles from Shanghai. The ship was floated at high tide with the aid of tugboats, without serious damage, and was able to continue its voyage. In February 1913, Tenyo Maru weathered a storm which began three days into the voyage and lasted six days; the storm destroyed the ship's gangway and smashed its rails; at times, the waves dashed over the smoke stacks. The 115 first and second class passengers were kept below decks while the captain made the decision to ride out the storm by heaving to, which was very unusual in a large steamship.

In 1921, the ship was fumigated due to a first-class passenger who became suddenly ill and died June 28 while en route from Nagasaki to Kobe. The passenger had bubonic plague. The cause was determined to be exposure to infected fleas from rats aboard the vessel.

Tenyo Maru carried the Japanese Friendship Dolls from Yokohama to San Francisco in 1927. It also carried opium and contraband. When Tenyo Maru arrived in San Francisco on July 9, 1929, passenger Sui'e Ying Kao, wife of the Chinese Vice Consul, requested that her baggage be passed and delivered at once, claiming diplomatic immunity from Customs inspection. The agents did not agree, broke the seals, opened the trunks, and found 2,300 cans of opium (about 1,000 pounds), worth about $600,000, making it a very large seizure by contemporary standards.

The ship was scrapped in 1933. The similarly named Japanese fishing vessel Tenyo Maru which collided with the Chinese freighter Tuo Hai, in Canadian territorial waters on July 22, 1991, was a different vessel.
