= Anyo Maru =

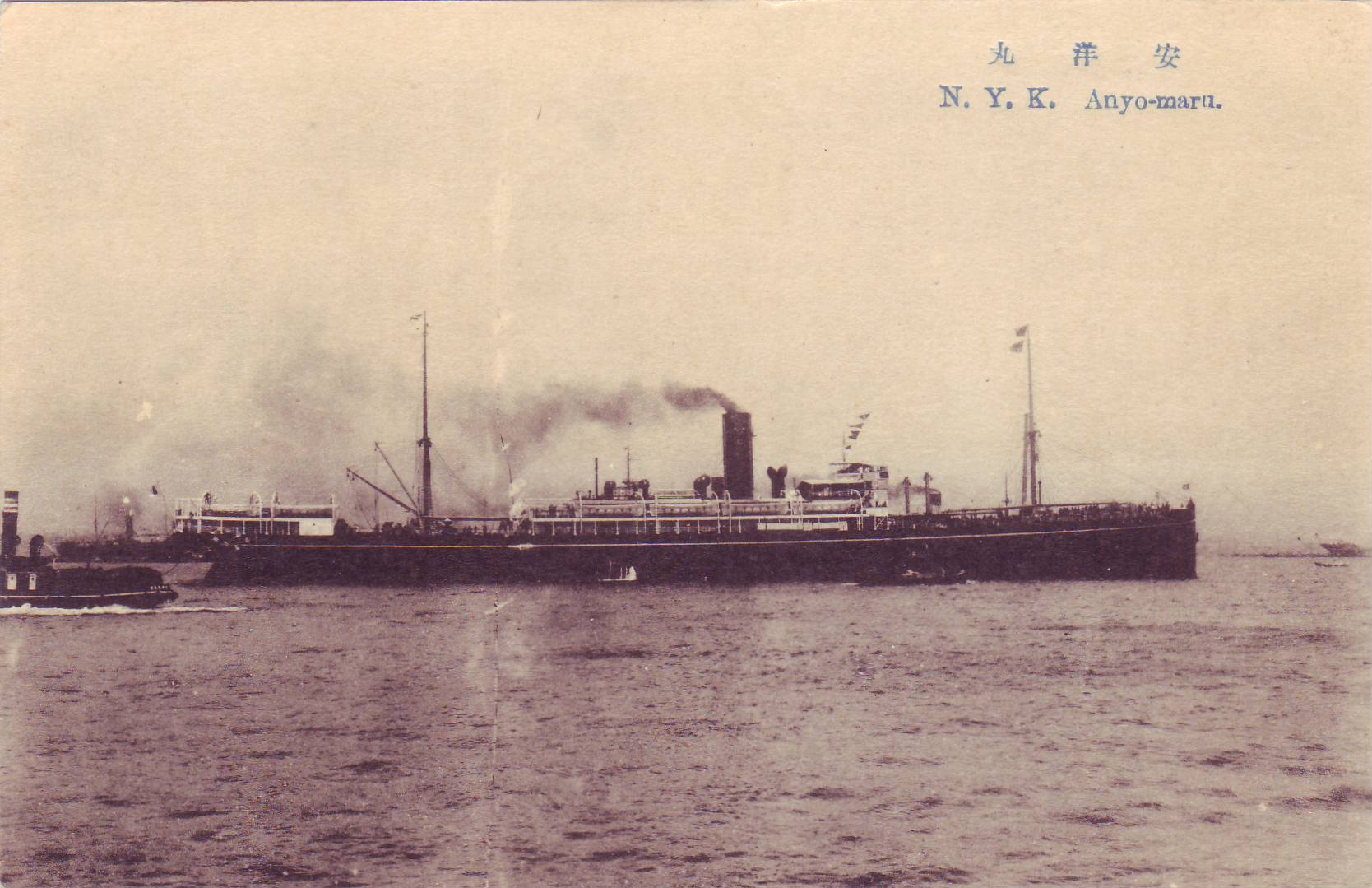
Anyo Maru

Anyo Maru (安洋丸, An'yō Maru) was a Japanese passenger liner.

She was built at a Mitsubishi shipyard from September 1911 to June 1913. She was initially operated by Toyo Kisen Kaisha (TKK). TKK built the vessel so she could take Asian immigrants to Pacific coast South American countries.

In 1916 there was an incident where Crook collided with the ship while fog had occurred. This incident happened off of Lime Point outside of San Francisco.

In 1921 it sailed into the harbor of Portland, Oregon, making it the largest ship at that time to visit that harbor.

In 1926 the ship was transferred to NYK Line.

On January 8, 1945, a United States submarine, in the course of World War II, caused Anyo Maru to sink.
