= Tenyo Maru =

Tenyo Maru is the name of the following ships:

- SS Tenyo Maru, launched in 1908 and scrapped in 1933
- MV Tenyo Maru, launched in 1935 and sunk in 1942
