= SS Bokuyo Maru =

Bokuyo Maru (墨洋丸) was a cargo and ocean liner, built in 1924 at the Tsurumi Naval Yard and registered to Tokyo.

The ship traveled between Japan and the west coast of South America; she transported the ancestors of Alberto Fujimori.

Initially she was operated by Toyo Kisen Kaisha. In March 1926, that company merged into Nippon Yusen Kaisha (NYK Line), and NYK acquired the ship.

On June 28, 1939, the ship experienced a fire from copper concentrate while in Los Angeles. The fire incident ended on July 2.

== Sinking ==
On July 18, 1939, the ship was on a voyage from Valparaíso, Chile, through Central America and then the San Pedro area of Los Angeles to Yokohama, with a planned arrival on July 22. The ship left Los Angeles on July 2, with S. Amano being the ship's captain.

Nitrates had been put on the ship in Valparaiso. While the ship was 1,125 miles (1,811 km) east of her destination, the nitrates ignited. 212 persons were on board. The 113 passengers were Japanese and Indian. The records did not show any Americans nor Europeans on the Los Angeles to Yokohama segment when the accident occurred. The Oakland Tribune stated that "many of the passengers had steerage tickets".

She sent out an SOS, received by a wireless center in Chōshi. This center then asked area ships to assist the Bokuyo Maru after the center lost contact.

SS Associated was an oil tanker owned by the company Associated Oil Company. Captained by Leland C. Hawkins, the Associated was on a Manila to San Francisco voyage when it rescued all but three people from the Bokuyo Maru. Two of the missing were crew members, and one was a three-year old boy. It was reported that the chief officer and chief engineer of the Bokuyo Maru had to knock out Captain Amano because he refused to leave the ship. They put a life jacket on him and threw him overboard. They were the last three men on board.

The Azuma Maru (吾妻丸), the Florida Maru (ふろりだ丸), the Nippon Maru, and the San Pedro Maru (さんぺどろ丸) had also set out to assist the Bokuyo Maru. The survivors were later placed on the Florida Maru, and taken to Japan.

Two explosions occurred as the fire hit the fuel tanks. The fire hit the ship's waterline, and the Bokuyo Maru went down into the sea.
