= Toyo Kisen =

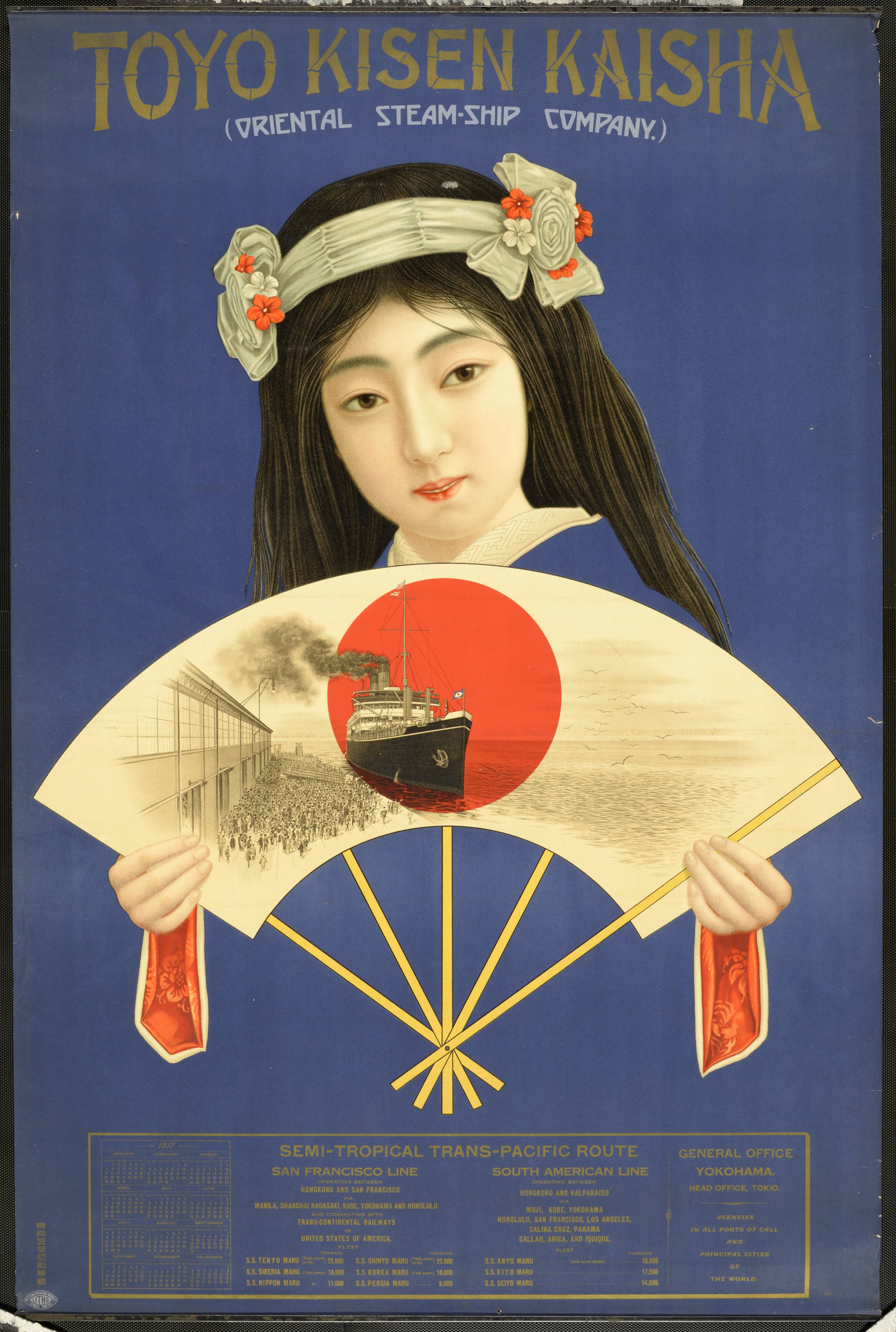
Advertisement for 1917

Toyo Kisen Kaisha (東洋汽船, Tōyō Kisen; TKK, "Oriental Steamship Company") was a Japanese shipping company, headquartered in Kōjimachi-ku, Tokyo.

In 1896 Asano Sōichirō created the company, with the plan to have a shipping line to San Francisco.

Starting in 1905 it operated passenger ships for the routes from Japan to South America, and the company transported low income East Asian immigrants to South America. The Japanese government funded the company via the National Far Western Shipping Route Subsidizing Act.

In 1926 the company decided to stop operating passenger ships due to competition from ships operated by American and British companies and due to a reduction in immigration. Nippon Yusen took the ships that TKK operated.

== Ships ==
- America Maru
- Anyo Maru
- Bokuyo Maru
- Hong Kong Maru
- Kiyo Maru
- Korea Maru
- Nippon Maru
- Persia Maru
- Seiyo Maru
- Shinyo Maru
- Siberia Maru
- Tenyo Maru
