= Yasuda =

Yasuda (安田 or 保田) is a Japanese surname. Notable people with the surname include:

- Akira Yasuda (born 1964), Japanese illustrator and animator
- Atsushi Yasuda (1868–1924), Japanese lichenologist
- Aya Yasuda (born 1982), Japanese luger
- Haruo Yasuda (born 1943), Japanese professional golfer
- Hironobu Yasuda (born 1983), Japanese racing driver
- Hiroshi Yasuda (born 1944), emeritus professor at the University of Tokyo and consultant for Nippon Telegraph and Telephone
- Junpei Yasuda (born 1974), Japanese journalist
- Kan Yasuda (born 1945), Japanese sculptor
- Kei Yasuda (born 1980), Japanese musician
- Ken Yasuda (born 1971), Japanese professional bodybuilder
- Ken Yasuda (born 1973), Japanese actor
- Kenneth Yasuda (1914–2002), Japanese-American scholar and translator
- Kimiyoshi Yasuda (born 1911), Japanese film director
- Kodai Yasuda (born 1989), Japanese football player
- Koh Yasuda (1907–1943), Japanese ophthalmologist
- Mac Yasuda, vintage-guitar collector
- Michihiro Yasuda (born 1987), Japanese football player
- Michio Yasuda (born 1949), former Japanese football player
- Michiyo Yasuda (1939–2016), Japanese animator
- Miwa Yasuda (born 1977), Japanese voice actress
- Yasuda Nagahide (1516–1582), retainer beneath the clan of Uesugi
- Narumi Yasuda (born 1966), Japanese actress
- Paul Hisao Yasuda (1921–2016), Japanese prelate of the Roman Catholic Church
- Robert Yasuda (born 1940), American abstract painter
- Ryumon Yasuda (1891–1965), Japanese painter and sculptor
- Satoru Yasuda (born 1975), Japanese pole vaulter
- Shota Yasuda (born 1984), J-pop singer and actor
- Sotaro Yasuda (born 1986), American born actor and model in Japan
- Suzuhito Yasuda, Japanese manga artist and illustrator
- Tadao Yasuda (1963–2026), Japanese sumo wrestler, professional wrestler and mixed martial artist
- Takeo Yasuda (1889–1964), Japanese military officer
- Takeshi Yasuda (born 1943), Japanese potter
- Toko Yasuda, Japanese musician
- Tomo Yasuda, Japanese-American musician
- Yasuda Tsuyoshi (born 1980), manga artist
- Yasunori Yasuda (保田 靖則; born 1952), Japanese volleyball player
- Yasuyuki Yasuda (安田 安之), Japanese communist revolutionary
- Yoshihiro Yasuda (born 1948), Japanese lawyer
- Yojūrō Yasuda (1910―1981), Japanese literary critic
- Yasuda Yukihiko (Shinzaburō; 1884–1978), figure in Taisho and early Showa period Japanese painting
- Yasuda Zenjirō (1838–1921), Japanese entrepreneur who founded the Yasuda zaibatsu
