= Shinano Maru (1900) =

Scrapped Japanese merchant ship

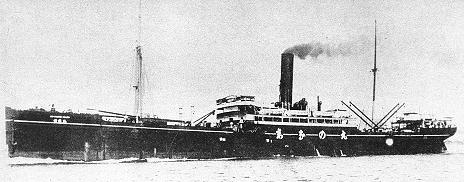
- Shinano Maru in 1905

History

Empire of Japan
- Name: Shinano Maru
- Ordered: 1904 Fiscal Year
- Builder: W. Henderson Co, Glasgow
- Launched: 31 January 1900
- Completed: April 1900
- Stricken: 1951
- Fate: Scrapped

General characteristics
- Displacement: 6,388 long tons (6,491 t)
- Length: 135.635 m (445 ft 0 in) w/l
- Beam: 14.996 m (49 ft 2.4 in)
- Draught: 7.89 m (25 ft 11 in)
- Propulsion: 2 × Triple-expansion steam engines; 5,144 shp (3,836 kW)
- Speed: 15.4 knots (28.5 km/h; 17.7 mph)
- Complement: 238
- Armament: 2 × 6 in (152 mm) guns

Shinano Maru (信濃丸) was a 6,388 GRT merchantman operated by the Nippon Yusen K.K Shipping Company (NYK). She was built by W. Henderson Co in Glasgow, for the express purpose of serving NYK's Japan to Seattle route. NYK originally intended that she be built at the Mitsubishi Nagasaki shipyards in Japan; however, Mitsubishi had experienced problems in the completion of Hitachi Maru, which had led to considerable delays. NYK chose not to wait, and Shinano Maru was ordered to Scotland. She was completed in April 1900. During the Russo-Japanese War Shinano Maru was converted into an armed merchantman. She has the distinction of discovering the Russian Fleet near Tsushima Strait on the eve of the Battle of Tsushima. After the war Shinano Maru reverted to civilian use, being scrapped in 1951.

== Early civilian service ==
Shinano Maru, with a length of 135.6 metres (444 ft 11 in), was designed to carry 238 passenger (26 first class, 20 second class, 193 third class), and her accommodations were regarded as modern and comfortable at the time of her completion. Initially, Shinano Maru was placed in service on Nippon Yusen routes between Australia and Japan.

Later in her early service with Nippon Yusen, Shinano Maru was reassigned to North Pacific routes to North America, making regular voyages between Yokohama and Seattle. She was involved in a collision off Victoria, British Columbia with the SS Empress of Japan on June 3, 1902. The novelist Kafū Nagai was a passenger in 1903.

== Battle of Tsushima ==
With the start of the Russo-Japanese War in February 1904, Shinano Maru was one of the first ships requisitioned by the Imperial Japanese Army for use as a troopship and military transport to convey troops and supplies to Korea and Manchuria. In March 1905, Shinano Maru was armed and converted into an auxiliary cruiser at Kure Naval Arsenal, mounting two 6-inch (152 mm) guns (one fore and one aft), and was commissioned into the Imperial Japanese Navy under the command of Captain Morikawa. Shortly before the Battle of Tsushima she was assigned to the Auxiliary Squadron of the Combined Fleet along with six other armed merchantmen and three torpedo boat tenders assigned to patrols of the Tsushima Strait to search for the Russian Baltic Fleet, which had been dispatched around the world to relieve the Japanese blockade of Port Arthur.

On the night of May 26–27 Shinano Maru, America Maru, Sado Maru and Manshu Maru were deployed as a lookout screen in the strait between Gotō Islands and Jeju-do. At 2:45 Shinano Maru sighted a suspicious ship, but the rising moon prevented proper identification. Shinano Maru steamed ahead and properly sighted the opponent at 4:30. It was an apparently unarmed hospital ship, communicating signals to other enemy ships, invisible in the morning haze. The sighted ship turned out to be the Russian hospital transport Orel. The rest of the Russian fleet had already sailed past Orel, undetected by the Japanese. Morikawa settled to search and seize Orel and closed in, only to notice half a dozen other Russian ships nearby. He fled the scene and broadcast the report of the sighting on the wireless. However, grid coordinates reported by Shinano Maru were incorrect by 10 to 20 miles (16 to 32 km), owing either to Morikawa's errors in dead reckoning or to his misunderstanding of Orel's position in the Russian order of battle. The Japanese Third Squadron hurried to the grid square reported by Morikawa, but could not find the trace of the enemy.

At 6:05 Shinano Maru reestablished visual contact with the Russian fleet, and continued shadowing it at 4 to 5 miles (6.4 to 8.0 km) distance. Russian officers advised admiral Zinovy Rozhestvensky to interfere but Rozhestvensky refused, insisting on continuing his course in strict radio silence. At 6:40 Shinano Maru was relieved by the Japanese cruiser Izumi. Confusion caused by Morikawa's first report was resolved, and now the Combined Fleet had precise information on the Russian advance. This intelligence ultimately led to the decisive Battle of Tsushima.

In the aftermath of the battle Shinano Maru and Dainan Maru located the sinking Sissoi Veliky and forced the captain to surrender it. Shinano Maru took the Russian survivors to captivity in Sasebo.

== Post-war civilian service ==
Shinano Maru returned to civilian service in 1906, on Nippon Yusen's routes to Seattle. After more modern vessels were available, Shinano Maru was transferred to regional services, especially the Kobe – Keelung route. In 1913, Kuomintang leader Sun Yat-sen sought refuge in Japan, and travelled to Kobe on Shinano Maru. In 1923, the ship was transferred to Kinkai Yusen, a subsidiary company of Nippon Yusen. In 1929, the ship was sold to Hokushin Kisen, and sold again in 1930 to the fisheries company Nichiro, which converted it into a floating factory ship supporting the fishing fleets in the North Pacific processing salmon off the coast of Kamchatka Peninsula.

Pressed back into service as a transport in the Pacific War, Shinano Maru was torpedoed January 18, 1944 with moderate damage, then slightly damaged by a naval mine on June 1, 1945, and again by an airstrike on July 14, 1945, which killed two crewmen. She was docked at Nagasaki during the final days of the war.

Shinano Maru was so obsolete and rusted that noted manga artist Shigeru Mizuki wrote in his diary that the iron of the hull was so rusted and thin that he considered it miraculous that the ship remained afloat, and that even the wake of a torpedo would be enough to sink it. After the surrender of Japan, it was used as a repatriation vessel bringing back Japanese former prisoners-of-war from Siberia. One of those returning to Japan on Shinano Maru was the future novelist Shōhei Ōoka. At the beginning of the Korean War, the ship was used as a mother ship for landing operations of the U.S. Navy. Shinano Maru was sold for scrap in 1951.
