= Hajime Yasuda =

Japanese businessman

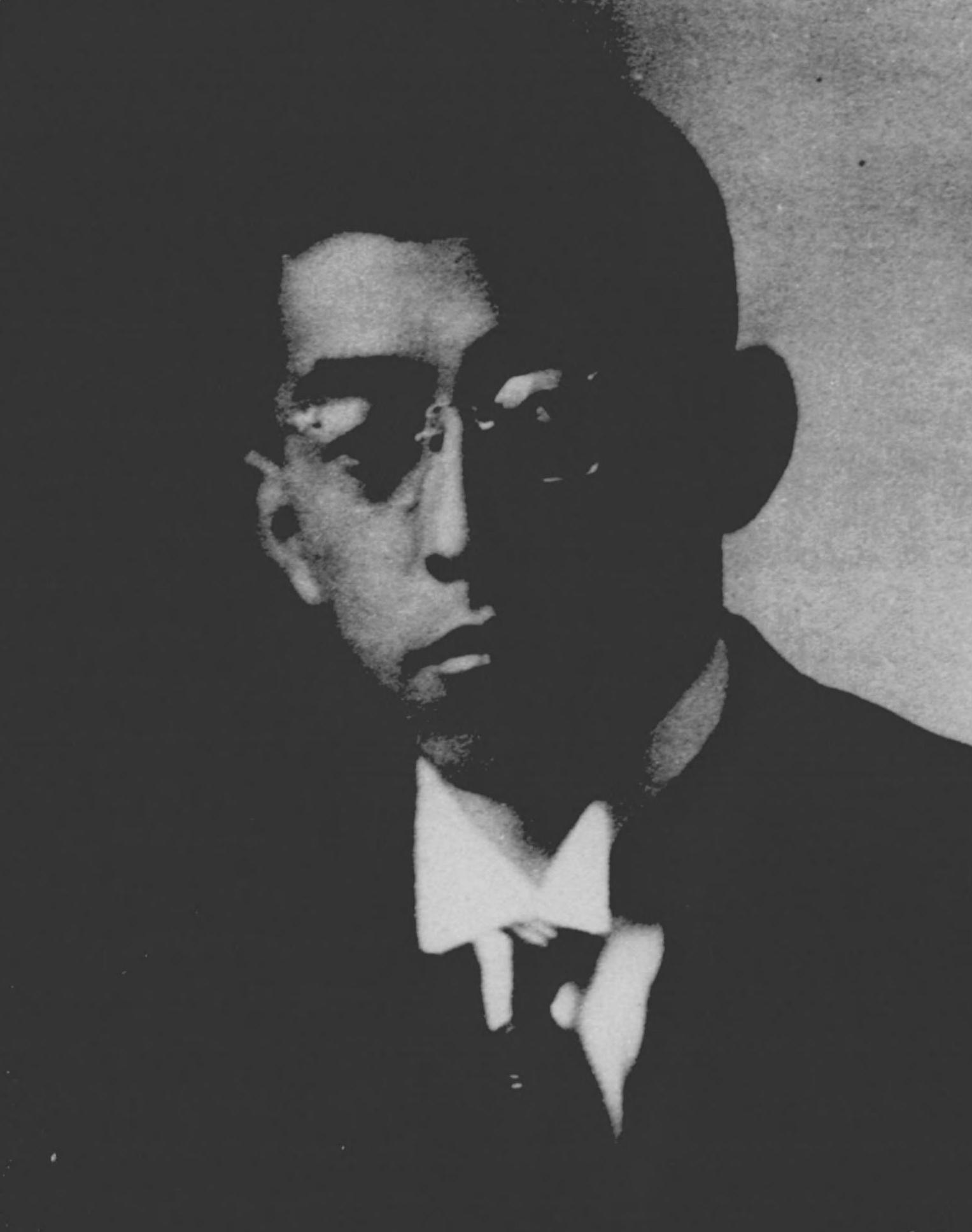

Hajime Yasuda (安田一, Yasuda Hajime; 14 April 1907 – 26 March 1991) was a Japanese businessman. He was head of the Yasuda zaibatsu at the end of World War II. He is best known for the "Yasuda plan" which proposed dissolving the zaibatsu in Japan.

== See also ==
- Yasuda clan
