= Oki Electric Industry =

Japanese manufacturing company

Oki Electric Industry Co., Ltd.

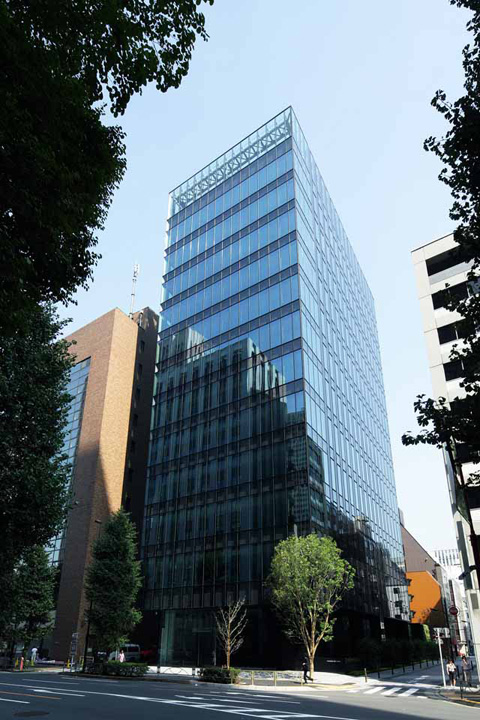
- Headquarters in Toranomon First Garden
- Type: Public KK
- Traded as: TYO: 6703; Nikkei 225 Component
- Industry: Telecommunications, electronics, information technology
- Founded: January 1881; 145 years ago
- Founder: Kibataro Oki
- Headquarters: 1-7-12 Toranomon, Minato-ku, Tokyo 105-8460, Japan; 35°40′11″N 139°44′58″E
- Key people: Shinya Kamagami (President and CEO)
- Products: Info-telecom systems; Social infrastructure systems; ATMs; Printers; Multifunction devices; Technology solutions
- Revenue: ▲US$ 4.72 billion (2013) (¥ 483.11 billion) (2013)
- Net income: ▲US$ 267.3 million (FY 2013) (¥ 27.35 billion) (FY 2013)
- Number of employees: 21,090 (consolidated, as of March 31, 2014)
- Website: oki.com/en

Oki Electric Industry Co., Ltd. (沖電気工業株式会社, Oki Denki Kōgyō Kabushiki-gaisha), commonly referred to as OKI (/ˈoʊki/), is a Japanese information and communications technology company, headquartered in Toranomon, Minato-ku, Tokyo and operating in over 120 countries around the world.

OKI produced the first Japan-made telephone in 1881, and now specializes not only in developing and manufacturing telecommunications equipment but also in information products and mechatronics products, such as automated teller machine (ATMs) and printers. OKI had a semiconductor business, which it spun off and sold to Rohm Company, Limited on October 1, 2008.

OKI Data, a subsidiary, which markets its products under the OKI brand, is focused on creating professional printed communications products, applications and services. OKI Data provides a wide range of devices, from printers, faxes and multi-functional products to business applications and consultancy services. Through its American business arm, OKI Data America markets the OKI proColor Series, a line of digital production printers designed specifically for the graphic arts and production market in North America to offer print services for color-critical applications.

== Company history ==
=== OKI of telecommunication (1881–1950s) ===
==== Founding ====
The company was founded by Kibataro Oki (1848–1906), an engineer formerly employed at a Kobusho (Ministry of Industry) factory. In 1877, only a year after Alexander Graham Bell's invention, Kubusho had started an effort to make telephone receivers by reverse engineering and Oki was in the team that came up with the first prototype. In January 1881, convinced that the nation was about to enter the age of communications, Kibataro Oki founded Meikōsha, which was later renamed OKI. The company manufactured the first telephone in Japan in 1881, five years after Bell invented the phone, and exhibited a silver-award-winning lacquer-coated wire at the 1885 International Inventions Exhibition in London.

==== Early years ====
OKI contributed immensely to the proliferation of phones in Japan under the country's Telephone Expansion Plans. The company saw the need of automatic exchanges as well, as phones became common. Asano Soichiro of Asano zaibatsu, a predecessor of the Fuyo Group, was elected to chairman in 1912.

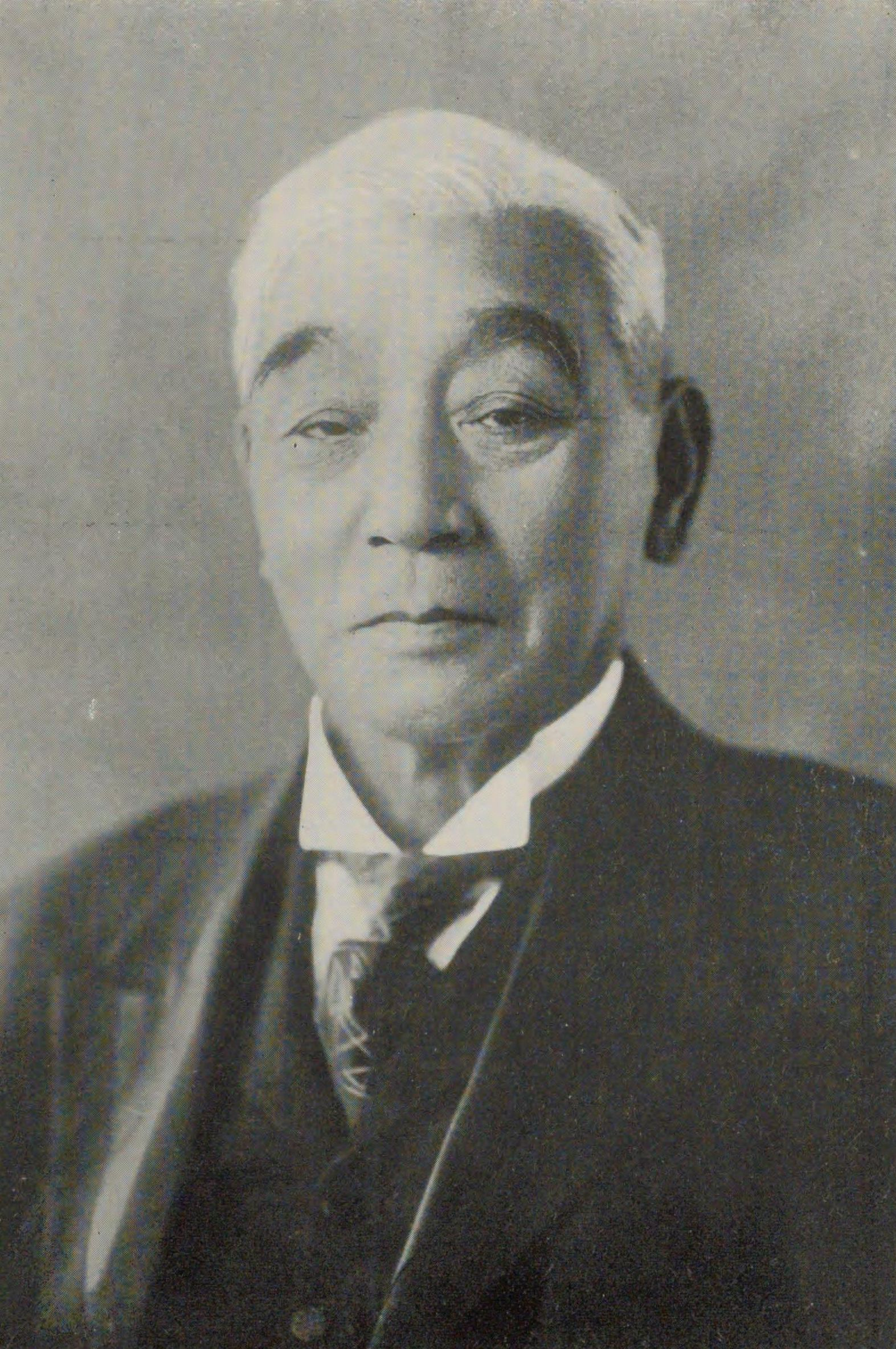
Asano Soichiro of Asano zaibatsu

==== Pre and post wars ====
During World War I, wartime demand brought large profits to OKI as demand for telephone service increased. A strong demand emerged for the PBX (Private Branch Exchange), the largest system of which in Japan installed by OKI. In addition to business from Japan, overseas business also grew, providing railroad-type printers, portable telephones and electric wires outside Japan. From around 1920, OKI achieved notable advances in its technical development of the common-battery switchboard. Asano Soichiro's son was appointed to the next chairman in 1931.

In the late 1930s, OKI's plants were used towards meeting the military demand for goods, having major effects on OKI's business, such as building new production plants, and increasing its capital as well as the number of its affiliates.

OKI increased its production capacity after WWII to restore magnetotype telephones and exchanges that were damaged during the war, OKI endured great difficulties as it moved toward rebuilding itself. On November 1, 1949, Oki Electric Industry Co., was established to succeed the former entity Oki Electric Co., Ltd. Two years later in November 1951, OKI's shares were listed on the Tokyo Stock Exchange. It was also at this time when OKI started mass-producing the "Type-4 telephone," which was called a "symbol of Japan's postwar reconstruction". In 1956, it was the first to produce a 100-line Ericsson-type crossbar-switching systems for commercial use.

=== OKI of electronics (1960s–1980s) ===
OKI gradually transformed itself into an electronics company from the second half of 1960s into the 1970s.

==== 1960s ====
To respond to the high-level economic growth Japan was experiencing, OKI needed to speed up its business operations and clarify responsibilities. OKI began producing and supplying business machines such as teletypewriters, and perforation typewriters. In June 1961, OKI launched OKITYPER-2000, an electric teletypewriter that could simultaneously make perforation tapes and book entry forms. The company also developed and sold various general-purpose computers such as OKITAC-5090, the first domestically produced computer to use core memory.

In 1964 OKI developed OKISAVER, a terminal for online deposits which was provided to financial institutions.

==== 1970s ====
In addition to minicomputers such as the OKITAC series developed in the mid-1960s, OKI began supplying various I/O devices, electroprinters, and dot printers, mainly to the financial industry in the 1970s. OKI's business at this time included cash dispensers (CDs), automatic depositors (ADs) and automated teller machines (ATMs).

Logo of Oki Data

In this period, OKI expanded its overseas business providing telecommunications systems to countries in the Middle East, Central and South American countries as well as other Asian countries. In 1972, OKI established Oki Data Corporation (ODC: today's OKI Data Americas), a Japan-US joint venture located in Philadelphia, to develop the DP100, dot printers.

In 1975, OKI developed the world's first automobile telephone system together with Bell Labs. This was the beginning of OKI's wireless technology, and, as of 2009, OKI keeps expanding this technology into vehicle-to-vehicle communications and ETC (Electronic toll collection) technologies.

==== 1980s ====
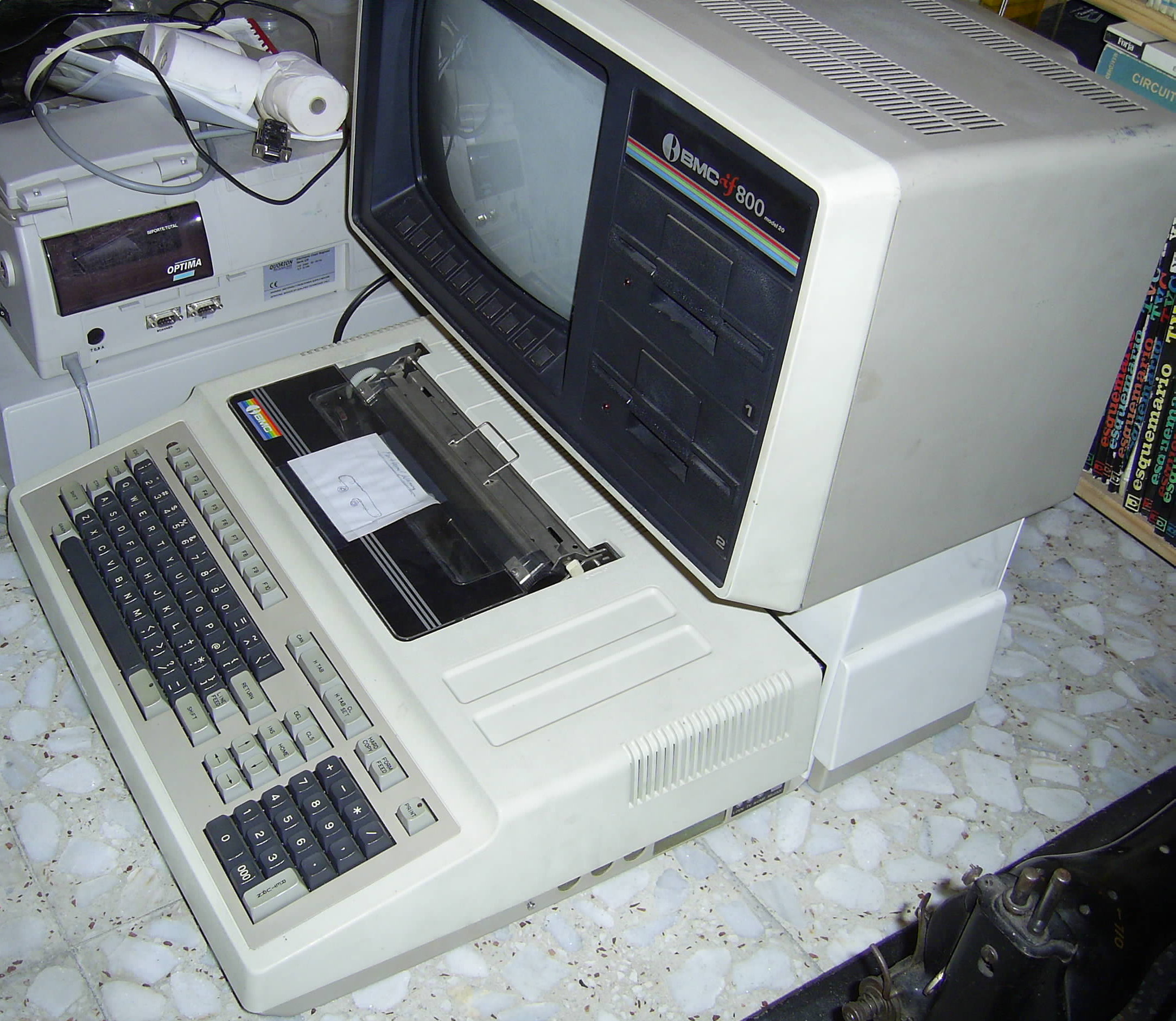
BMC IF 800 20 03 (1982)

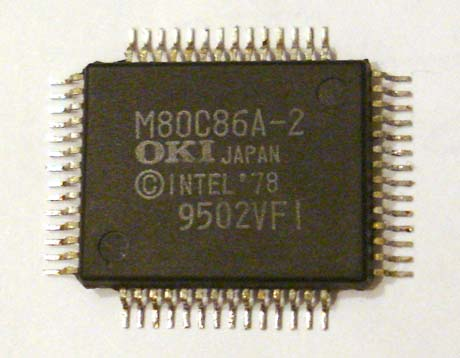
OKI M80C86A 56-pin QFP chip

In May 1980, OKI launched the IF-800 series, which was a successful business-use PC business. It also added a facsimile business unit in search of private sector demand. In 1982, OKI introduced the world's first cash-recycling ATM, allowing deposited banknotes to be immediately used for withdrawal.

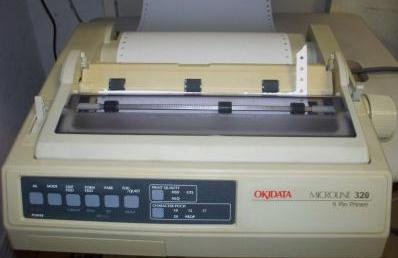
Oki Data Microline 320 dot matrix printer

Printers

- Microline
  - 80, 82/83, 84, 92/93
  - 180, 182/183, 190, 192/193
  - 280, 292/293, 294
  - 320 FB, 321, 380, 390 FB, 393, 395
  - 520/521, 590/591
- Okimate 10, 20
- Pacemark
  - 2350, 2410
  - 3410, 4410
- Laserline 6

ICs

- MSM5232 8-channel tone generator
- MSM6242 RTC
- MSM6295 4-channel ADPCM

=== OKI of network solutions (1990s) ===
In the early 90s, Japanese economy was in the midst of recession that continued after the bubble economy collapsed, which also hit a strong blow to OKI's business. In October 1994, OKI spun off its printer and facsimile business, and established Oki Data Corporation. In the later 90's, with the spread of the Internet, OKI worked on being recognized as a company that offers network solutions.

In December 1990, the OKI 900 cell phone was marketed. The phone was famous in phone phreaking culture for its advanced debugging menu allowing eavesdropping of others cell phone calls and observation of cell phone network operation.

=== 2000s ===
In 2004, OKI released its IP CONVERGENCE Server SS9100, the industry's first Microsoft. Net-compliant server, and in 2006, released its Center Stage NX5000, a carrier-grade communication server compliant with next-generation networks.

In 2008, as part of its business selection and concentration measures, OKI spun off its semiconductor business to Rohm Co., Ltd.

=== 2020s ===
In 2026, OKI and Hitachi agreed to integrate their development and manufacturing operations for ATMs and other automated equipment through Hitachi Channel Solutions. Under the planned structure, OKI would transfer its automated-equipment operations into the company and hold 60% of the resulting joint venture, while Hitachi would retain 40%. Operations were scheduled to begin in October 2026.

== Controversies ==
Despite Russian invasion of Ukraine, OKI continues its operations in Russia. The company has not publicly disclosed any plans to withdraw or suspend its activities in the Russian market. Notably, in 2012, OKI delivered its ATM-Recycler G7 cash-recycling ATMs to Alfa-Bank, Russia's largest private bank, marking the first installation of Japanese-made cash recyclers in the country.

== Subsidiaries ==
Oki Data Americas, Inc., a subsidiary of Oki Data Corporation of Japan, produces PC peripheral equipment under the OKI brand, including digital color and monochrome printers, serial impact dot matrix printers, multifunction products and facsimiles.

The history of Oki Data Americas can be traced back to 1972 when the company was founded as a joint venture between two Philadelphia entrepreneurs and their Japanese customer, Oki Electric, to develop and produce information technology products. One of its popular products was the Okimate 10 thermal transfer printer, one of the first affordable color printers for early home computers.

Oki Data Americas, Inc. relocated from Mt. Laurel, NJ and is headquartered in Irving, Texas. Other Oki Data Americas offices are in Mississauga, Canada; Mexico City, Mexico; and São Paulo, Brazil.

Oki Data Americas ceased sales of all Oki-branded hardware as of March 31, 2021. Oki Data printer hardware will continue to be sold in the United States under their distribution partner's brand, IntoPrint.

== Sponsorships ==
Oki sponsored English Premier League football club Portsmouth F.C. from 2005 to 2009. From 2003 to 2008, Oki owned the naming rights to Jubilee Oval in Kogarah, Sydney, Australia, which was the home ground of National Rugby League team St George Illawarra Dragons. Oki was also the major sponsor of 1.FC Kaiserslautern from 1990 to 1996. During the 1998–1999 season OKI sponsored the French Ligue 1 team HSC Montpellier.

== Gallery ==
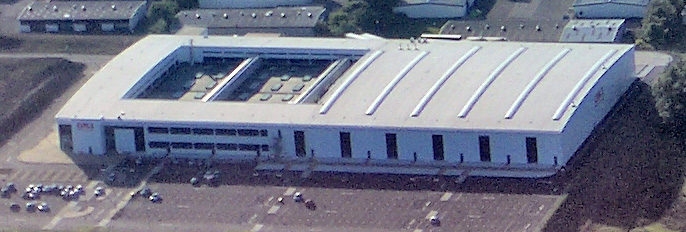
OKI manufacturing plant in Cumbernauld, Scotland

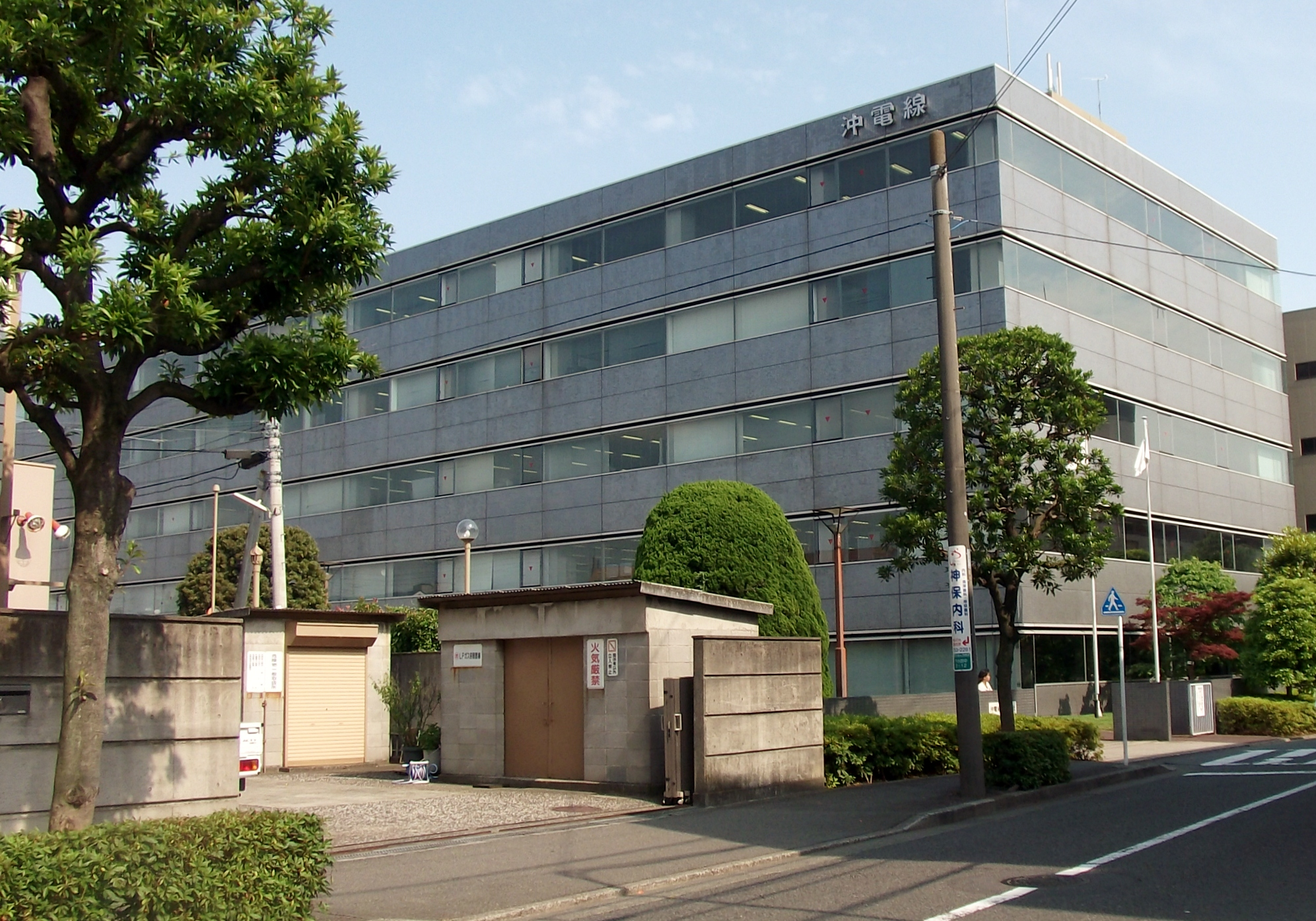
The headquarters of Oki Electric Cable in Nakahara-ku, Kawasaki

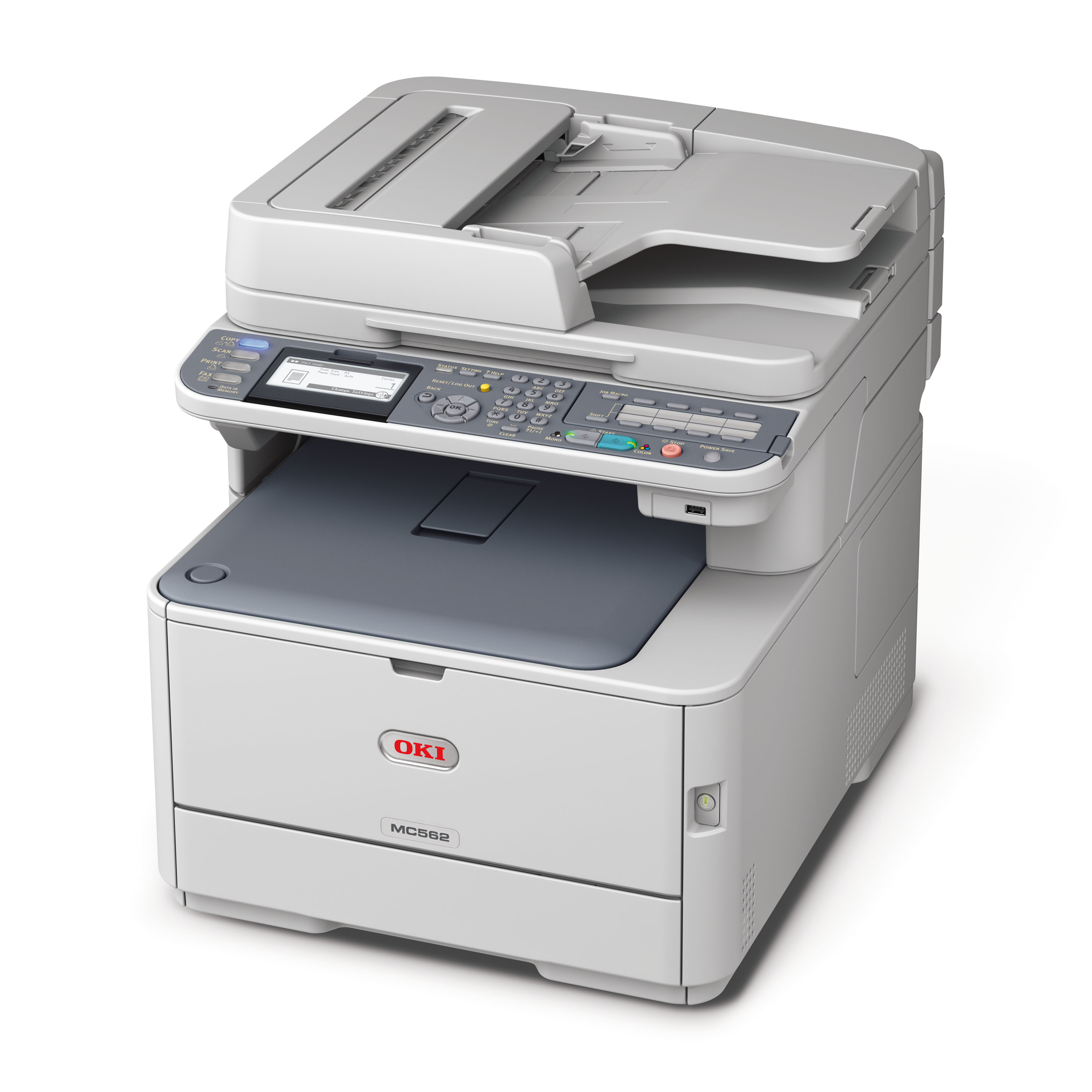
An OKI colour multifunction printer

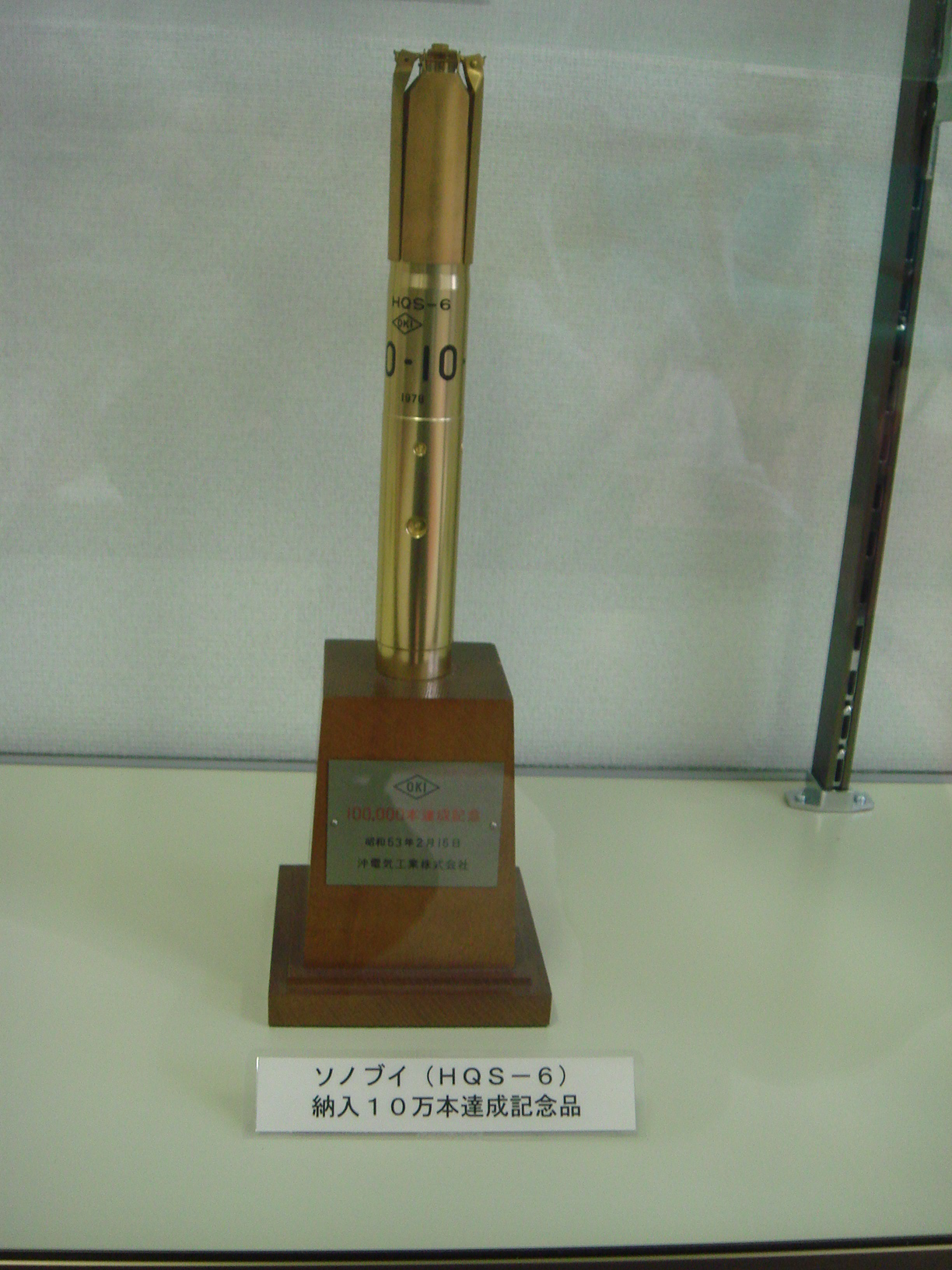
JMSDF HQS-6 type Sonobuoy manufactured by Oki Electric Industry

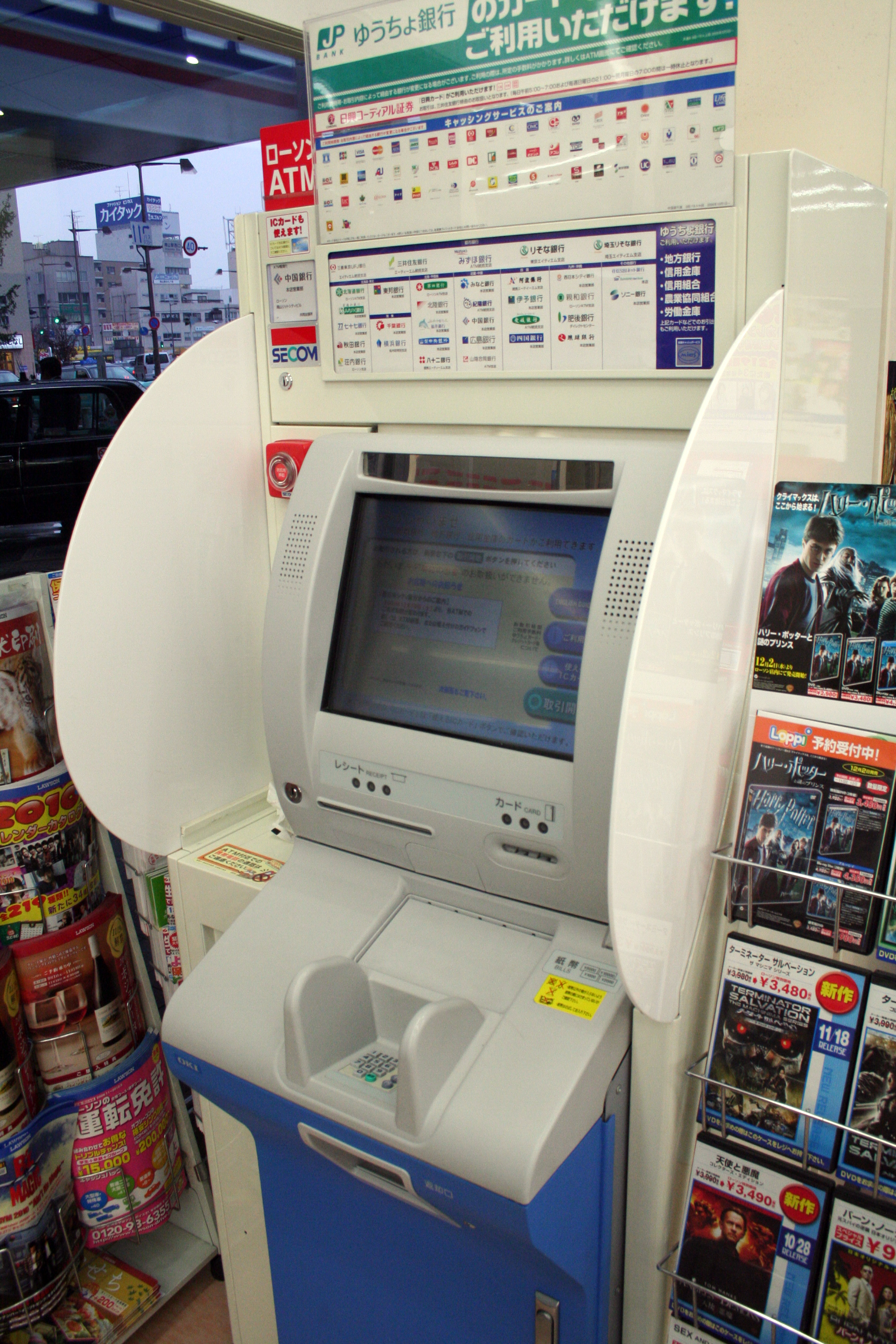
Compact ATM of the predecessor installed at Lawson
