= Oki Kibatarō =

Japanese engineer

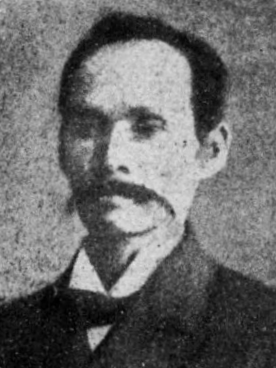
- Education: Tokyo Imperial University
- Occupations: Businessman, telecommunications engineer
- Known for: Oki Electric Industry

Oki Kibatarō (沖 牙太郎; 1848–1906) was a Japanese businessman and telecommunications engineer formerly employed at a Japanese Ministry of Industry (Kōbushō) factory. In 1877, only a year after Alexander Graham Bell's invention, Kōbushō had started an effort to make telephone receivers by reverse engineering and Oki was in the team that came up with the first prototype. In January 1881, convinced that the nation was about to enter the age of communications, Oki founded Meikōsha, which was later renamed Oki Electric Industry. The company manufactured the first telephones in Japan in 1881, only five years after the device was invented by Bell.
