= TOA Construction Corporation =

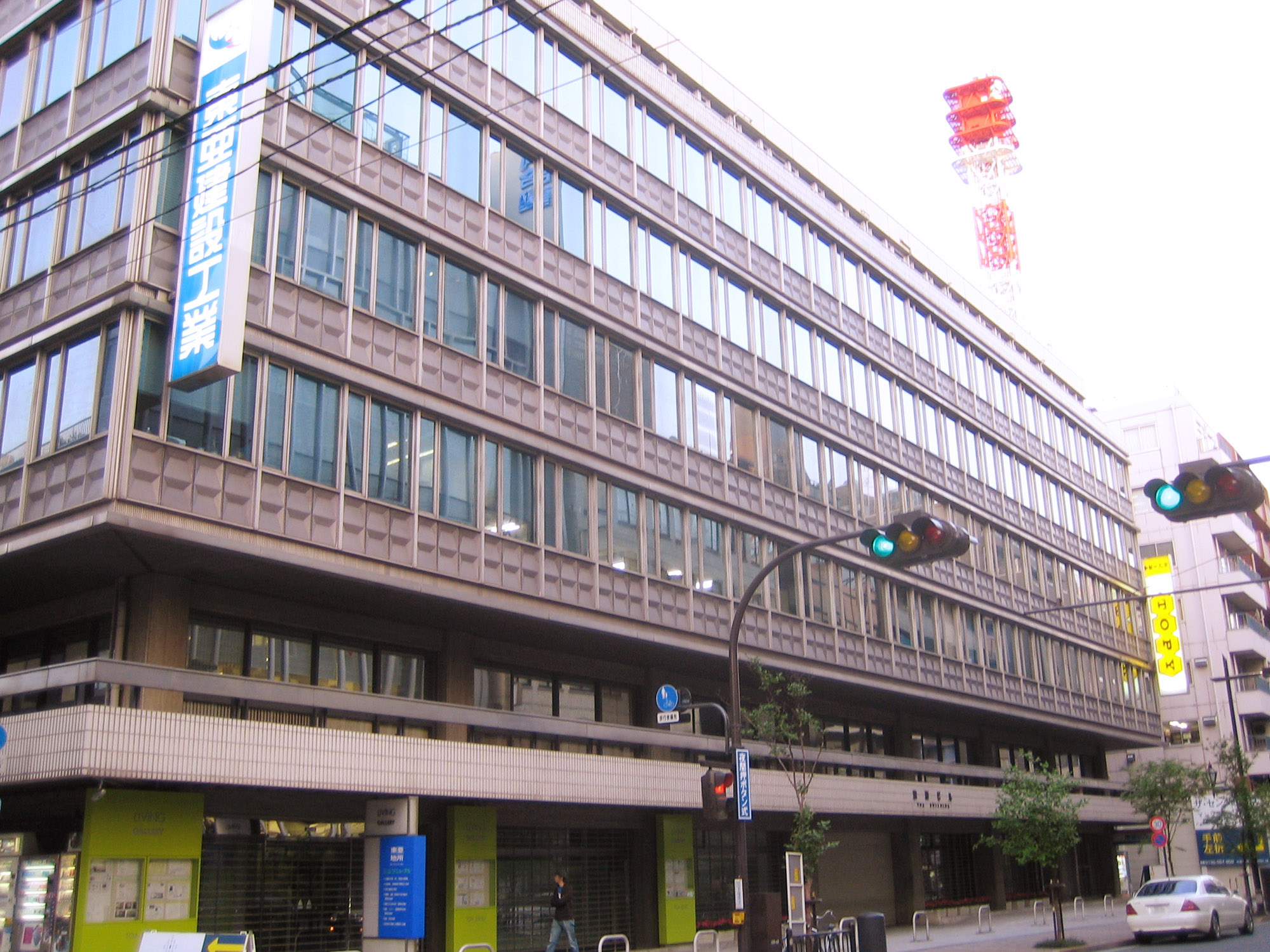
TOA Construction headquarters in Chiyoda ward of Tokyo.

Tōa Kensetsu Kōgyō (東亜建設工業, Tōa Kensetsu Kōgyō) (TYO: 1885), or TOA Corporation is a Japanese general contractor construction firm.

Originating from a construction group established in Tsurumi, Yokohama in 1908 by Asano Soichiro, the company was first incorporated in 1920 as Tokyo Bay Marine Works Co., Ltd, and was renamed to its present name in 1973. Tōa was one of the companies of the former Asano zaibatsu.

TOA Corporation is one of the five major coastal, marine, harbor related construction companies of Japan.

Yokohama's Osanbashi Pier, Kurushima-Kaikyō Bridge, Rainbow Bridge (Tokyo), Niigata Bay Tunnel, and Lagunasia are among the works Tōa was involved in.
