= Asano Sōichirō =

Japanese businessman

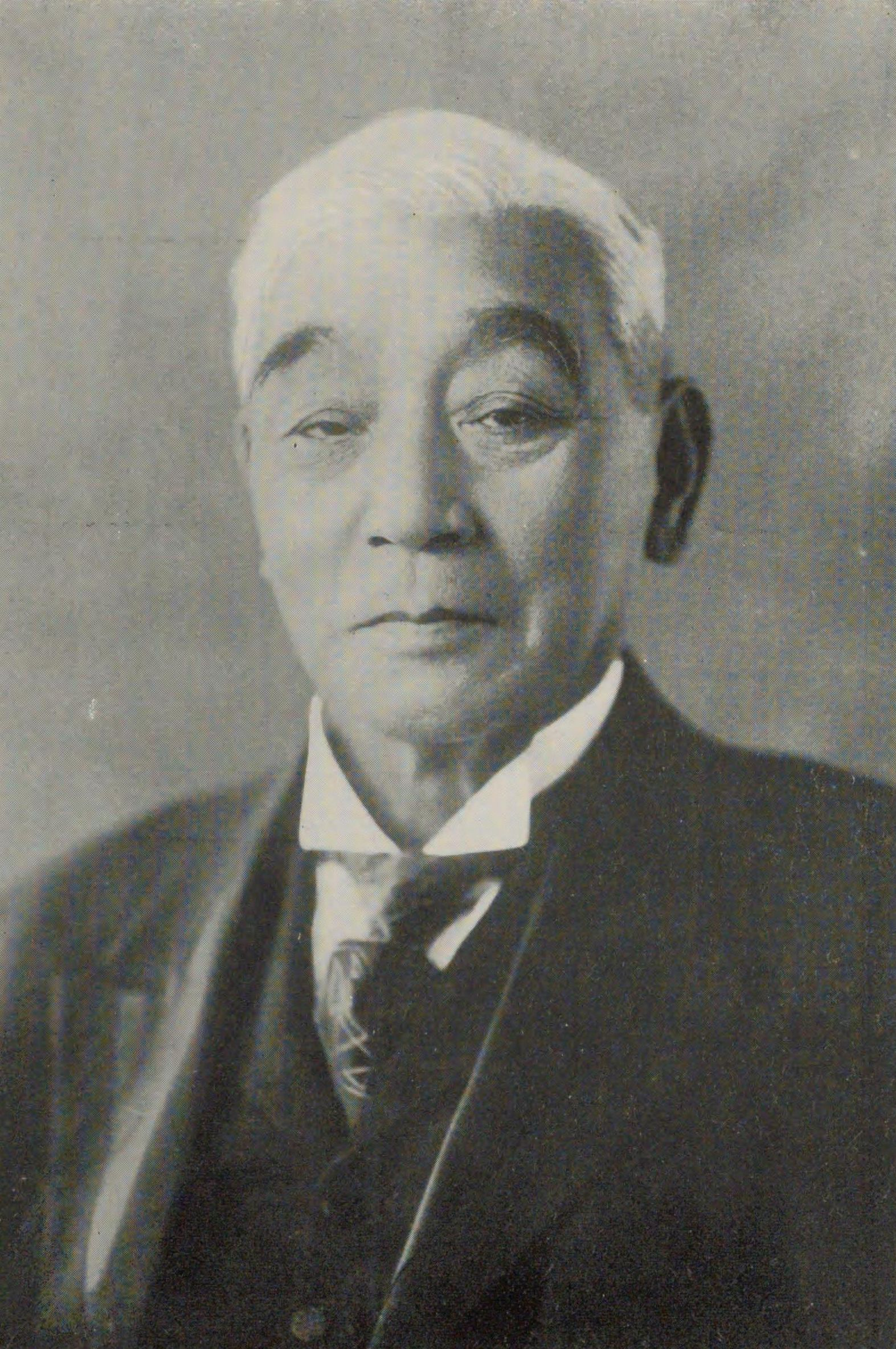
Asano Soichiro

Asano Sōichirō (浅野 総一郎; April 13, 1848 – November 9, 1930) was a Japanese businessman responsible for founding a number of companies, including what became today's Sapporo Breweries, Toa Construction Corporation, Oki Electric Industry, JFE Group and Taiheiyo Cement (formerly Asano Cement).

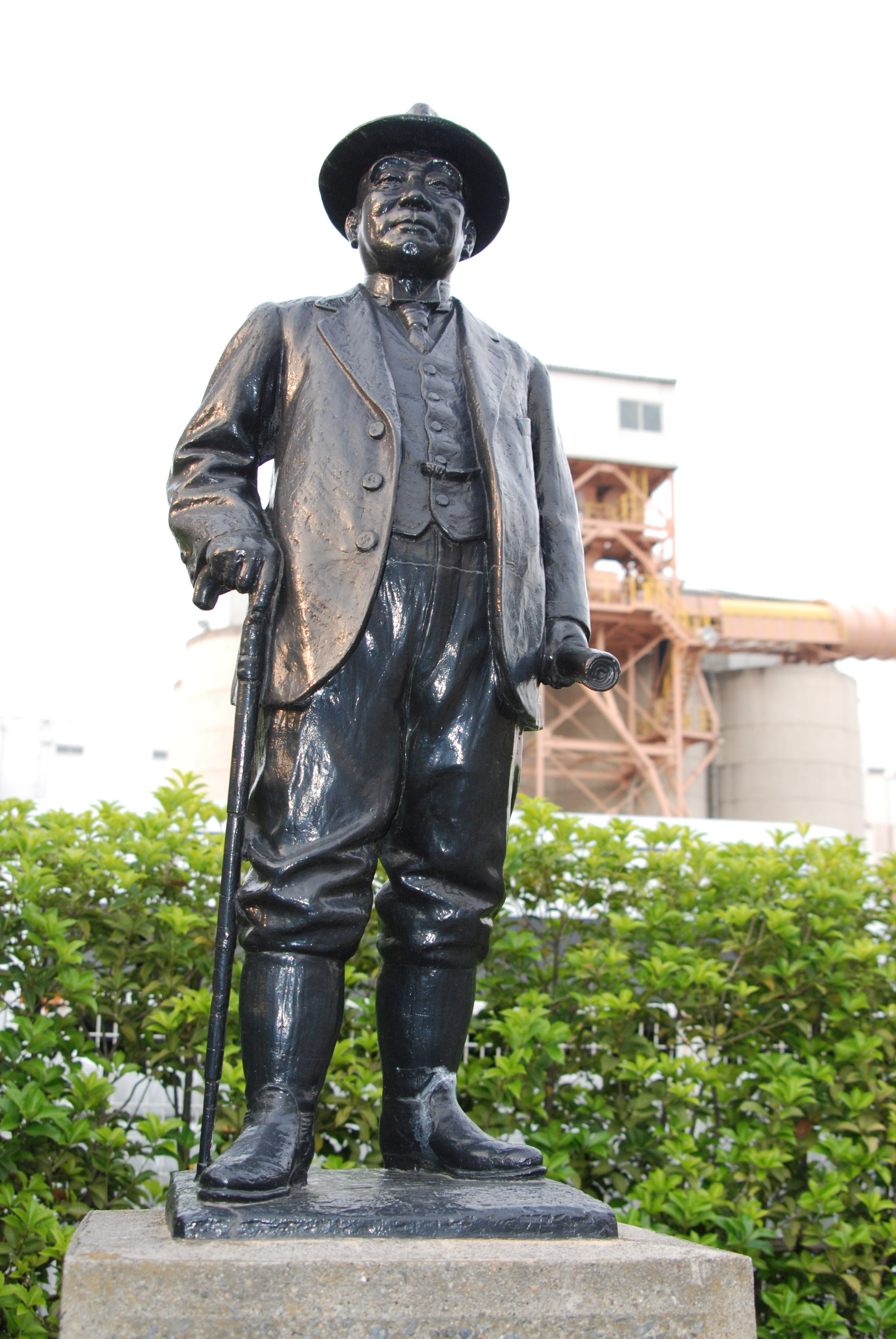
Statue of Asano Soichiro

== Biography ==
Asano came from a samurai family in the Toyama region. His Y-DNA haplogroup is D1a2a1a2b1a1a8a (D-CTS4093). He was Doctor Asano Taijun's son. He was originally named Asano Taijiro. Although He studied medicine, he began business in his hometown and failed. He lost his money and did moonlight flit to Tokyo. He sold drinking water as a street vendor. Then he moved to Yokohama, bought coke (fuel), which a gas company threw away, sold it to Fukagawa Cement Works, and became very rich.

He purchased Fukagawa Cement Works from the government in 1884 (Asano Cement), with help from Shibusawa Eiichi, founded Iwaki Coal Mine in 1884, Oriental Liner (Toyo Kisen) in 1896, Tsurumi Reclamation Company (Toa Construction Corporation) in 1913, Asano Shipbuilding and Engineering (Japan Marine United) in 1916, Nippon Chuya Bank in 1916, Oki Electric Industry in 1917, Asano and Company in 1918, Asano Holding Company in 1918, and diversified his business interests, which eventually became a minor zaibatsu (Asano zaibatsu). His Nippon Chuya Bank was unsuccessful, so he sold it to Yasuda zaibatsu in 1922. Asano zaibatsu kept minor because it did not include a bank and was ranked fifth in scale. Asano is called "the cement king."

Asano also reclaimed Tokyo bay from 1913 to 1927, made a coastal industrial zone (Keihin Kogyo Chitai) and established the forerunner of the JR Tsurumi Line there, located between Tokyo and Yokohama. Asano Station is named after him. He is called the "father of Keihin industrial area" now.

He founded Asano High School in 1920, and Asano Institute of Technology in 1925.
