= Asano zaibatsu =

Japanese conglomerate

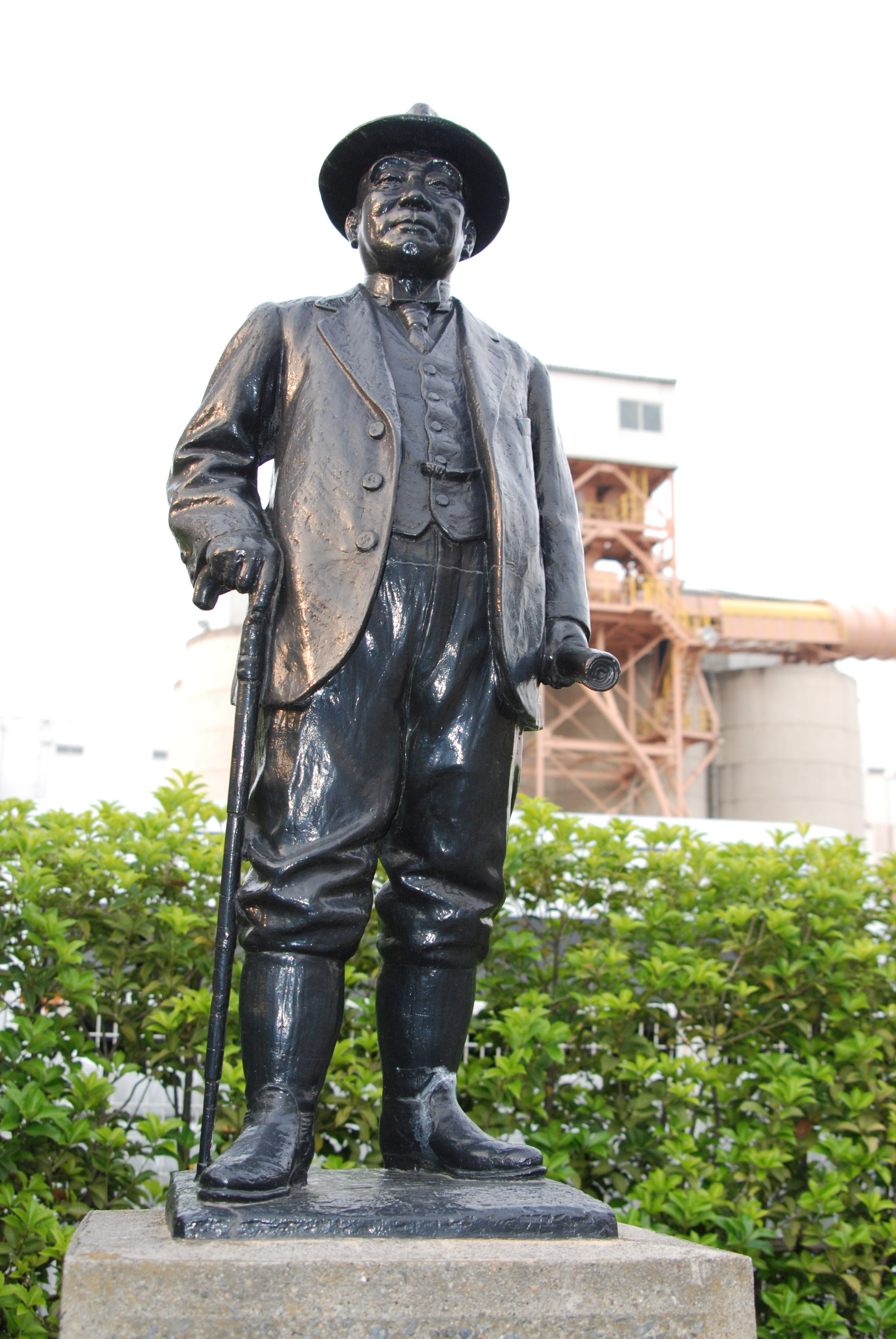
- Statue of Asano Soichiro
- Industry: Conglomerate
- Founded: 1884
- Founder: Asano Soichiro
- Defunct: 1947

Asano zaibatsu 浅野財閥, one of the major second-tier zaibatsu (conglomerates) in Japan, was founded in 1887 by Asano Sōichirō 浅野総一郎 with support from Shibusawa Eiichi 渋沢栄一, the founder of the Shibusawa zaibatsu 渋沢財閥 and "father of Japanese capitalism".

== History ==
Asano Sōichirō 浅野総一郎 founded Asano zaibatsu in 1884 after purchasing the Fukagawa Cement Works from the government with support from Shibusawa Eiichi 渋沢栄一 of the Shibusawa zaibatsu. Because the Asano zaibatsu had no bank of its own it relied on Shibusawa and Yasuda zaibatsu capital, but it was still "the fifth-largest" zaibatsu in Japan. It had 64 affiliated companies in 1940 and 94 in 1943. It almost monopolized the cement industry in Japan. "Often these companies are controlled through only a minority of shares, domination being accomplished by personal influence, and the manipulation of credit, supplies and outlets." Since 1945, when most of the zaibatsu were disbanded by Douglas MacArthur in occupied Japan, the Asano zaibatsu has spun off many companies.

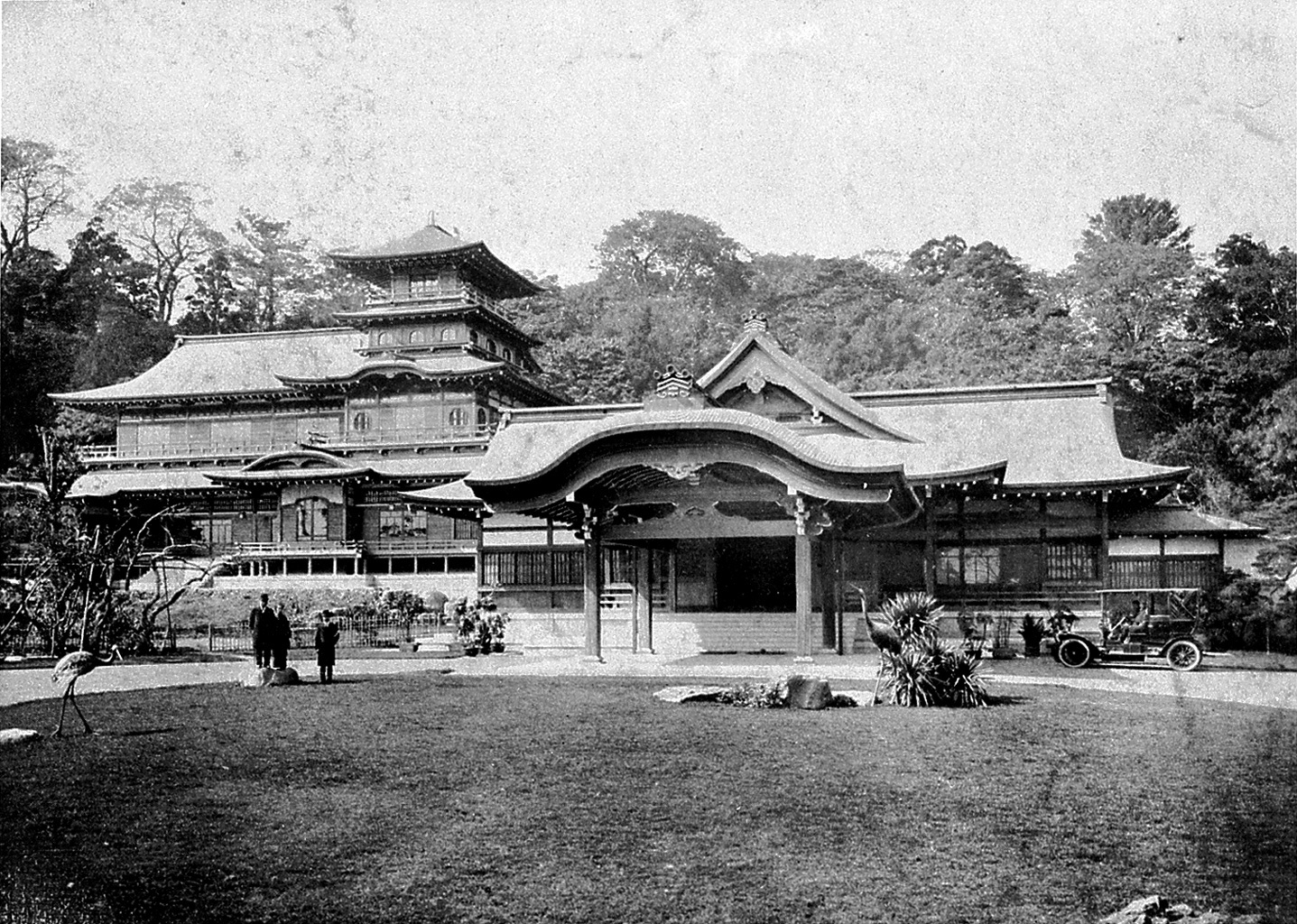
Asano-house in Tokyo

The mark of NKK

== Member companies ==
- TOA Construction Corporation 東亜建設工業 (formerly Tsurumi Marine Works 鶴見埋築, Tokyo Bay Marine Works 東京湾埋立, Toa Kowan Kogyo 東亜港湾工業)
- Taiheiyo Cement 太平洋セメント, one of the largest cement companies in Japan, formed by a merger of Chichibu Onoda (itself a merger of Chichibu Cement and Onoda Cement) and Nippon Cement 日本セメント）(formerly Asano Cement 浅野セメント).
- Oki Electric Industry 沖電気
- Asano Shipbuilding Company (Asano Dock) 浅野造船所 (Japan Marine United ジャパンマリンユナイテッド)
- Asano Carlit 浅野カーリット (Japan Carlit 日本カーリット)
- Toyo Kisen Line 東洋汽船 (Nippon Yusen 日本郵船)
- Iwaki Coal Mine 磐城炭鉱 (Spa Resort Hawaiians スパリゾートハワイアンズ)
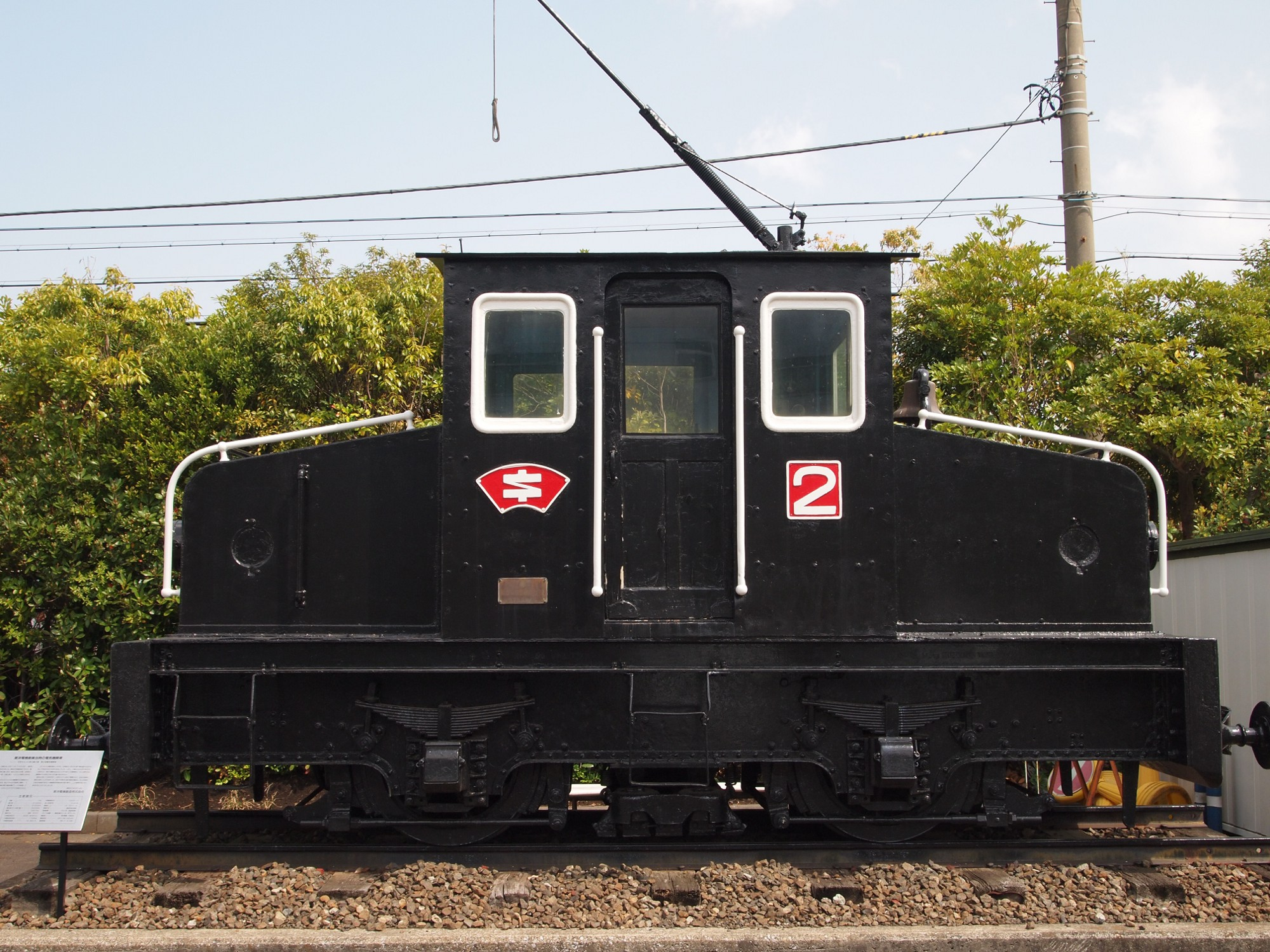
- left: The mark of Asano Cement
  Tsurumi Rinko Tetsudo (Tsurumi Harbor RR.) 鶴見臨港鉄道 (JR Tsurumi Line 鶴見線)
- Nambu Line 南武鉄道（JR南武線）
- Ome Line 青梅鉄道 (JR青梅線)
- Itsukaichi Line 五日市鉄道（JR五日市線）
- Sangi Railway 三岐鉄道
- Musashino Railway 武蔵野鉄道（Seibu Railway 西武鉄道）
- NKK or Nippon Kokan 日本鋼管 (JFE Holdings, JFE Steel, JFE Engineering)
- Tokyo Gas 東京瓦斯, 東京ガス
- Sapporo Breweries 札幌麦酒、サッポロビール

== Hospitals ==
- Nippon Kokan Hospital 日本鋼管病院 founded in 1918
- Asano Hospital 浅野病院 founded in 1919

== Schools ==
- Asano High School 浅野中学校・高等学校 founded in 1920
- Asano Institute of Technology 浅野工学専門学校 founded in 1925
