= Yasuda Station =

Yasuda Station (安田駅) is the name of two train stations in Japan:

- Yasuda Station (Kōchi)
- Yasuda Station (Niigata)
