= SS Shinyō Maru (1911) =

Japanese passenger liner

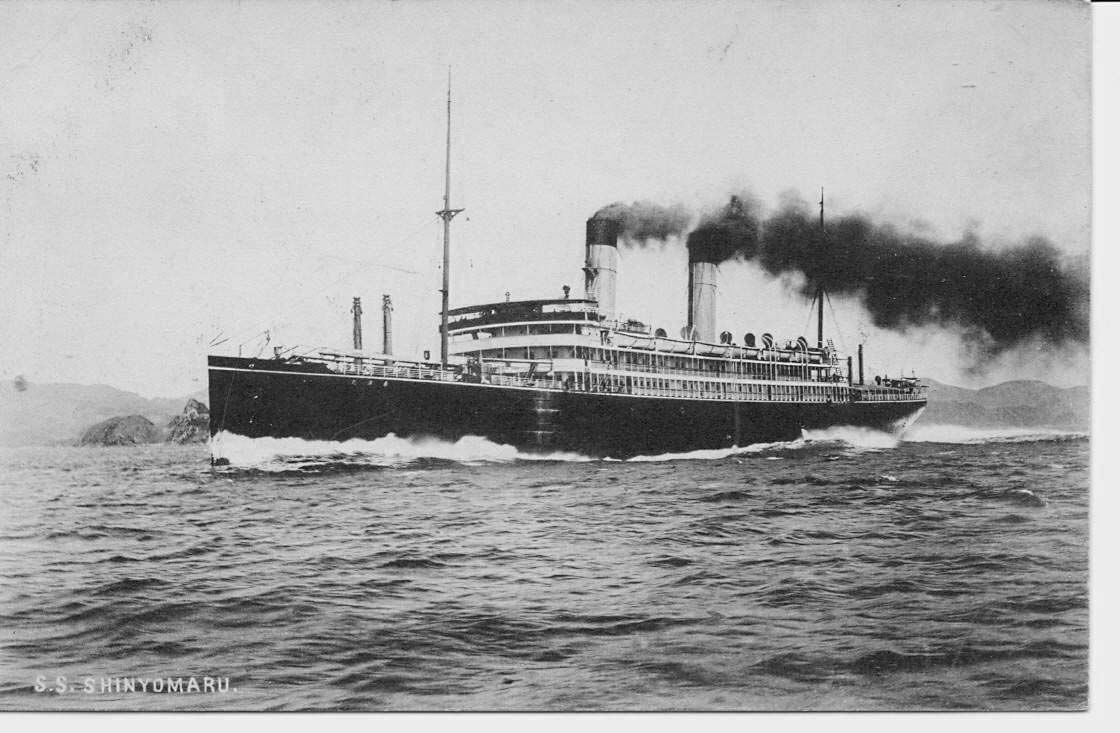

History

Japan
- Name: Shinyō Maru
- Operator: Toyo Kisen Kaisha (1911–1926); Nippon Yusen Kaisha (1926 TKK merger with NYK–1932)
- Builder: Mitsubishi Dockyard & Engine Works, Nagasaki
- Launched: 1911
- Out of service: 1932
- Fate: Scrapped 1936

General characteristics
- Type: Passenger liner
- Tonnage: 13,426 gross register tons (GRT)
- Length: 558 ft (170 m)
- Beam: 61.9 ft (18.9 m)
- Propulsion: 3 sets Parson's turbines driving 3 screws
- Speed: 21 knots (39 km/h; 24 mph)
- Capacity: Passengers: 275 first class, 75 second class, and 800 steerage

SS Shinyō Maru (春洋丸) was built in Nagasaki in 1911 by Mitsubishi Dockyard & Engine Works. Her length was 558 ft (170 m) and breadth 61.9 ft (18.9 m) Her tonnage was 13,426 GRT, with a displacement of 21,650 ('22 000') tons. Her triple screws gave her a speed of 21 knots. The liner had accommodation for 275 first class, 75 second class, and 800 steerage passengers. Shinyo Maru was powered by thirteen Scotch boilers providing steam for three sets of Parsons turbines for 17,000 horsepower.

She was the third of three new liners built specifically for the trans-Pacific liner route (Hong Kong—San Francisco) for Toyo Kisen Kaisha Steamship Co. (TKK). Shinyo Maru made trials on 25 July 1911, delivered to TKK on 15 August and departed for Yokohama and San Francisco on 21 August 1911.

Her sister-ships were the SS Tenyo Maru (1908–1933), of 1908, and the Chiyo Maru, of 1909. The career of the Chiyo Maru was curtailed in April 1916, when she ran aground in fog, off Hong Kong, and was damaged beyond repair.

Toyo Kisen Line was third steamship company to offer a regular trans-Pacific liner schedule, in 1899, after the Pacific Mail Steamship Company (PMSS) and the Occidental and Oriental Steamship Company (O&O). These two great rivals were both US companies and TKK was the first non-American line to enter the service. The original three ships were the Nippon Maru, the America Maru and the Hong Kong Maru, but when the three large liners entered service, the latter two were sold to the Osaka Line (OSK) and relegated to coastal traffic around Japan. In August 1916, the Korea Maru and the Siberia Maru were bought from PMSS, partly to replace the Chiyo Maru. However, the company found it difficult to compete during the slump of the 1920s and was taken over by the larger Nippon Yusen Kaisha (NYK).

The Shinyo Maru continued, with her sister-ship, for several years under NYK management, before being laid up in 1932. She was finally scrapped in 1936. The Tenyo Maru was likewise laid up in 1930 and scrapped in 1933.
