= Yasuda clan =

Japanese samurai kin group

The Yasuda clan was a Japanese samurai kin group in the Sengoku period and Edo period.

== History ==
The clan was established by Ōe no Hiromoto.

In the Sengoku period, a branch of the Yasuda clan was made responsible for the collection of duties on the cloth trade.

In modern history, the Yasuda are known as a "financial clan" because of their success in banking.

== Notable clan leaders ==
- Yasuda Zenjiro
- Hajime Yasuda

== See also ==
- Yasuda zaibatsu
- Yoko Ono
- Paul Hisao Yasuda
