= Meiji Yasuda Life =

Japanese life insurance company

Meiji Yasuda Life Insurance Company
- Logo used from 2024

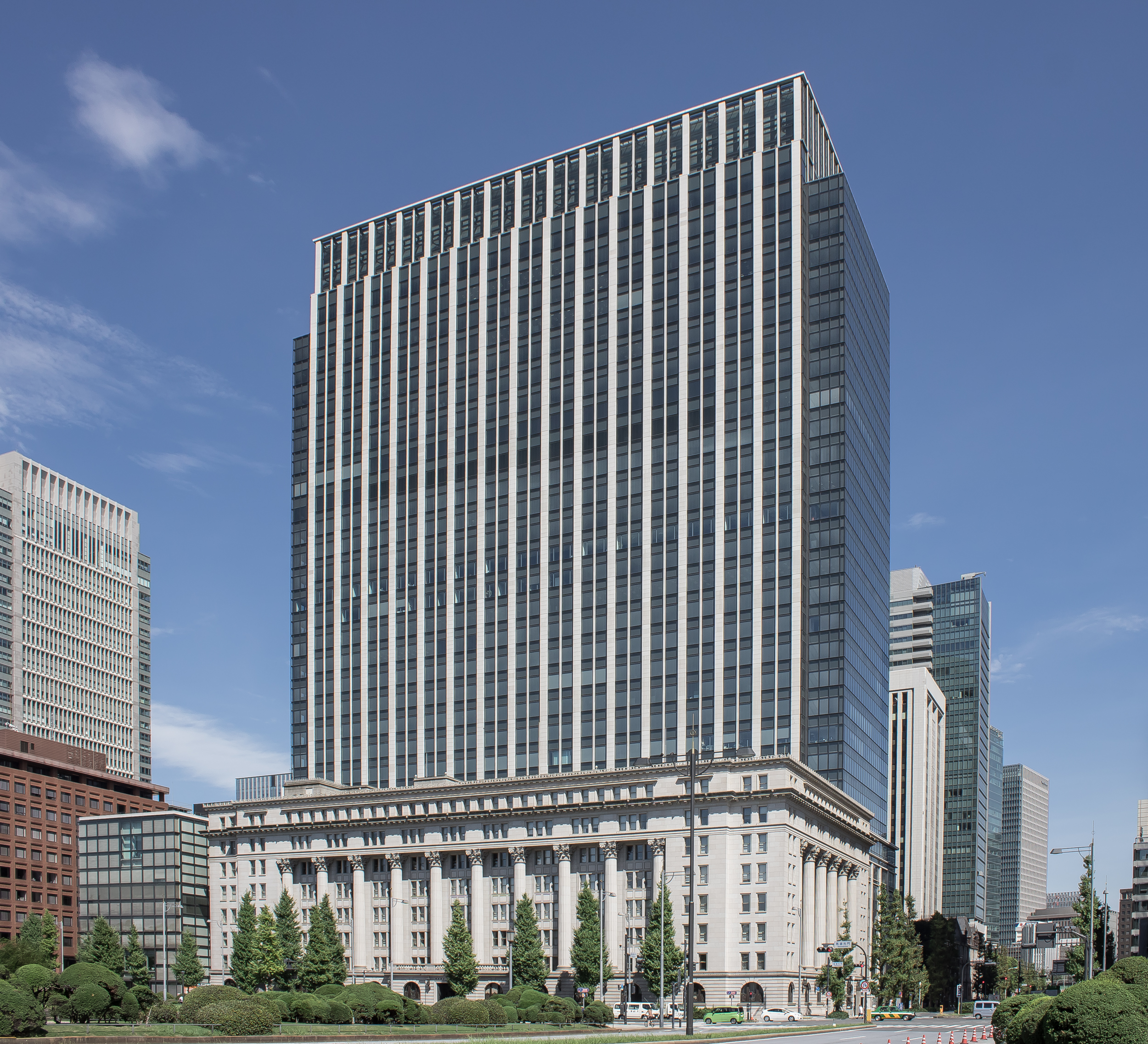
- Headquarters in Marunouchi
- Trade name: Meiji Yasuda
- Native name: 明治安田生命保険相互会社
- Romanized name: Meiji Yasuda Seimei Hoken Sōgo-gaisha
- Company type: Mutual insurance
- Industry: Insurance
- Founded: 1881; 145 years ago (as Meiji Life); 2004; 22 years ago (merger)
- Founder: Yasuda Zenjirō
- Headquarters: Marunouchi, Chiyoda, Tokyo, Japan
- Area served: Japan
- Key people: Akio Negishi (Chairman); Hideki Nagashima (President)
- Total assets: JPY 36,281.1 billion
- Number of employees: 41,536
- Website: www.meijiyasuda.co.jp

Meiji Yasuda Life Insurance Company (明治安田生命保険相互会社, Meiji Yasuda Seimei Hoken Sōgo Kaisha), doing business as Meiji Yasuda (明治安田), is a Japanese life insurance company, which is headquartered in Tokyo and created in 2004 from the merger of Meiji Life and Yasuda Life. The company is one of the oldest and largest insurers in Japan. The Meiji Yasuda Life Insurance Company is a member of the Mitsubishi and Fuyo groups and participates in the former's Friday Conference. It is the main sponsor of the J1 League since 2015.

== History ==
In 1881, entrepreneur Zenjiro Yasuda founded the Yasuda Mutual Life Insurance Company, making it part of the Yasuda zaibatsu.

On January 1, 2004, Meiji Mutual Life Insurance Company and Yasuda Mutual Life Insurance Company merged to create the Meiji Yasuda Life Insurance Company.
