= Yasuda zaibatsu =

Japanese financial conglomerate

Yasuda zaibatsu (安田財閥) was a financial conglomerate owned and managed by the Yasuda clan. One of the four major zaibatsu of Imperial Japan, it was founded by the entrepreneur Yasuda Zenjirō. It was dissolved at the end of World War II.

== Origins ==
Yasuda Zenjirō moved to Edo at the age of 17 and began working in a money changing house. In 1863, he started providing tax-farming services, and greatly magnified his wealth by buying up depreciated Meiji paper money that the government subsequently exchanged for gold. He quickly began to amass newly available capital, establishing the Third National Bank in 1876 and forming the Yasuda Bank (later known as the Fuji Bank) in 1880, the center of the Yasuda zaibatsu.

Yasuda consolidated his empire in banking and finance, specializing in backing small and medium-sized traders and industrialists. In 1880, Yasuda founded the Yasuda Mutual Life Insurance Company (now Meiji Yasuda Life Insurance). In 1893, the Yasuda zaibatsu absorbed the Tokyo Fire Insurance Company, later renamed the Yasuda Fire and Marine Insurance Company.

== 20th century ==
The Yasuda focus on banking was narrowed by the merger of eleven Yasuda-controlled banks into the Yasuda Bank in 1913. The post-merger bank was by far the largest of all the zaibatsu banks.

Yasuda Zenjirō was assassinated in 1921 when he refused to make a financial donation to an ultra-nationalist. Zenjirō's son, Yasuda Zennosuke, assumed leadership of the zaibatsu. By 1928, the Yasuda zaibatsu was ranked behind only the Mitsui and Mitsubishi groups in total capital. In that year, the Yasuda zaibatsu encompassed 66 companies and reported total capital of ¥308 million.

During World War II, the Japanese government began forcing consolidation of major financial institutions. In January 1942, Hajime Yasuda, the head of the conglomerate, announced that all Yasuda family members would withdraw from related and subsidiary companies, assuming new leadership positions as board members over all zaibatsu concerns.

== Dissolution ==
Following Japan's defeat in August 1945, Hajime Yasuda and Yasuda executives assumed a leadership role in planning for the dissolution of their own group. The "Yasuda plan" was submitted in October 1945 and stipulated that the Yasuda zaibatsu would be dissolved and that Yasuda Bank would cease to control Yasuda subsidiaries. In addition, family members and executives appointed by them would resign from all Yasuda companies. The Yasuda Plan, with some revisions, was accepted by the U.S. government in November of that year.

== Present day ==
After the restoration of the sovereignty of Japan, employment restrictions at Yasuda affiliates were lifted from the Yasuda family, and the Fuyo Group was formed with Fuji Bank, the successor to Yasuda Bank, at the core. Although the Yasuda zaibatsu was revived as a corporate group in the form of a keiretsu, it was no longer controlled by Yasuda family management.

Artist Yoko Ono, the wife of musician John Lennon, is a daughter of the Yasuda clan. She is the great-granddaughter of Yasuda Zenjiro.

== See also ==
- Fuyo Group
- Yoko Ono
