= Land Bank of Taiwan, Tainan Branch =

Bank building in West Central, Tainan, Taiwan

- 土地銀行台南分行
- Former names: Nippon Kangyo Bank's Tainan Branch

General information
- Type: bank
- Architectural style: Ancient Greek architecture
- Location: West Central, Tainan, Taiwan
- Coordinates: 22°59′31.9″N 120°12′10.7″E
- Completed: 1920s
- Client: Nippon Kangyo Bank
- Owner: Land Bank of Taiwan

The Land Bank of Taiwan, Tainan Branch (traditional Chinese: 土地銀行台南分行; simplified Chinese: 土地银行台南分行; pinyin: Tǔdì Yínháng Táinán Fēnháng) is the branch office of Land Bank of Taiwan located in West Central District, Tainan, Taiwan.

== History ==
The bank building was originally constructed during the Japanese rule of Taiwan in the 1920s and established under the name of Nippon Kangyo Bank's Tainan Branch (Chinese: 原日本勸業銀行台南支店). Kangyo means promoting and awarding industries in Japanese language. After the handover of Taiwan from Japan to the Republic of China in 1945, the government seized the building and used it as Land Bank of Taiwan. In 1983, the arcade at its western side was demolished to make way for the Zhongyi Road widening and was subsequently restored.

== Architecture ==
The bank building was constructed with columns in ancient Greek architecture and a mixture of Japanese and American architectural styles. At its exterior columns, there is a Swastika character, pattern of mums and Japanese Gods of Fortune. The overall building shape forms a triangle.

== Transportation ==
The building is accessible within walking distance southwest of Tainan Station of Taiwan Railway.

== See also ==
- List of museums in Taiwan
- National Taiwan Museum
