= Aozora Bank =

Japanese commercial bank

Aozora Bank, Ltd.

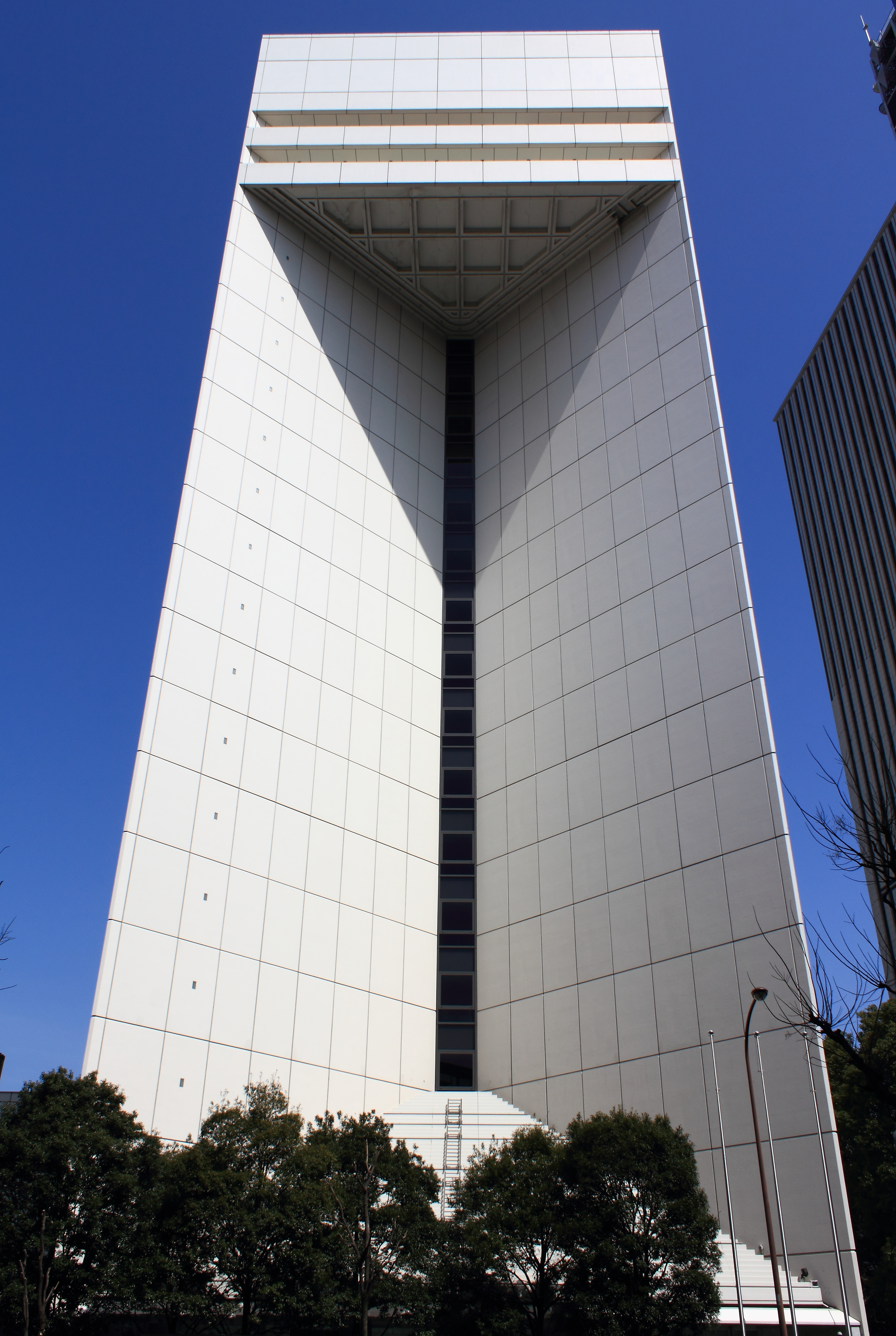
- Native name: 株式会社あおぞら銀行
- Type: Public
- Traded as: TYO: 8304
- Industry: Money Center Banks
- Predecessor: Nippon Credit Bank
- Founded: April 1957; 69 years ago
- Headquarters: Chiyoda, Tokyo, Japan
- Key people: Brian F. Prince (chairman); Shinsuke Baba (president and CEO)
- Products: Time deposits Investment trusts Individual annuity insurance Telephone banking services ATM alliances Personal loans Asset Management Consulting Services
- Total assets: ¥7,762.4 B JPY (Mar. 2025)
- Number of employees: 1,359 (Bank only)
- Website: www.aozorabank.co.jp

Aozora Bank, Ltd. (株式会社あおぞら銀行, Kabushiki-gaisha Aozora Ginkō; lit. "Blue Sky Bank") is a Japanese commercial bank that offers service in 19 branches in Japan and in 2 overseas representative offices (as of July 2012). Originally based on the Japanese operations of the Bank of Chōsen, it was known from 1957 to 1977 as Nippon Fudosan Bank and from 1977 to 2001 as Nippon Credit Bank (NCB).

== History ==
Nippon Fudosan Bank was founded in 1957 to manage the remaining assets of the Bank of Chōsen in Japan. It received a special government trust banking license similar to that of the Long-Term Credit Bank of Japan (LTCB), established in 1952. In 1977, it was renamed the Nippon Credit Bank.

In December 1998, NCB was brought under government control in order to deal with its extraordinary amount of bad debt left over from the crash of the Japanese asset price bubble in the early 1990s: at the time, the bank was approximately ¥270 billion in debt.

An investor group led by Softbank, Orix and Tokio Marine & Fire Insurance Co. purchased NCB in 2000 for ¥80 billion. As part of this deal, the government included a "defect warranty provision" (瑕疵担保条項, kashi tanpo jōkō) to the effect that NCB could demand within the next three years that the government purchase any claims which had fallen by twenty percent or more from value. A similar provision had controversially been offered to the purchasers of LTCB, which had recently been similarly purchased from the government and renamed Shinsei Bank. Aozora applied this provision conservatively in order to write off ¥400 billion in bad debts owed by about 100 companies, in contrast to Shinsei Bank, the contemporaneous successor of the Long-Term Credit Bank, which wrote off nearly three times as much and was criticized in political circles for doing so.

The sale of NCB to Softbank was viewed as a precedent for the licensing of Sony Bank, Seven Bank and other new banking platforms in Japan.

The bank was renamed "Aozora" in 2001. Softbank initially planned to make Aozora an investment bank for internet-related companies. However, Softbank was unsuccessful in obtaining the cooperation of the Financial Services Agency, and sold its 49% stake to Cerberus Capital Management in September 2003 for ¥101 billion. Aozora launched operations as a retail bank on April 1, 2006, and opened its first new branch in Nihonbashi on November 20.

Aozora Bank was listed as the No. 1 unsecured creditor to Lehman Brothers with about US$463 million in bank loans to the investment bank as it filed for Chapter 11 bankruptcy in September 2008. By comparison, the second largest unsecured creditor was Mizuho Bank with $289 million, and third largest Citibank (Hong Kong branch) with $275 million.

On December 16, 2008, Aozora Bank announced that it had ¥12.4 billion exposure to the Bernard L. Madoff ponzi scheme.

On April 25, 2009, Aozora Bank and Shinsei Bank announced negotiations to integrate their operations in the summer of 2010, with an eye toward an eventual merger. Banks had been hit by losses in the US subprime market. The talks collapsed in May 2010 amid disputes over capitalization and business strategy, as well as the abatement of the 2008 financial crisis.

Aozora acquired Japan Wealth Management Securities in 2011, merging it with existing subsidiary Aozora Securities in 2012.

In January 2013, Cerberus announced that it would sell most of its stake in Aozora, cutting its total share from 58 percent to 7.7 percent. Cerberus sold this last portion of its stake to Barclays for distribution to other investors in August 2013, ending Cerberus's shareholding in Aozora.

== Locations ==
Aozora's head office is located in the Kudan area of Chiyoda City, Tokyo, near Yasukuni Shrine.

The bank has retail branches in Chiba, Fukuoka, Hiroshima, Kanazawa, Kyoto, Nagoya, Osaka (Namba and Umeda), Sapporo, Sendai, Takamatsu, Tokyo (Ikebukuro, Jiyugaoka, Nihonbashi, Shibuya, Shinjuku and Ueno) and Yokohama.

Aozora also has representative offices in New York, Singapore, Seoul, Jakarta and Shanghai, and financing subsidiaries in the Cayman Islands, Hong Kong, Luxembourg, the United Kingdom and the United States.

== See also ==
- List of investors in Bernard L. Madoff Securities
- List of banks
- List of banks in Japan
