= National Taiwan Museum =

- 國立臺灣博物館
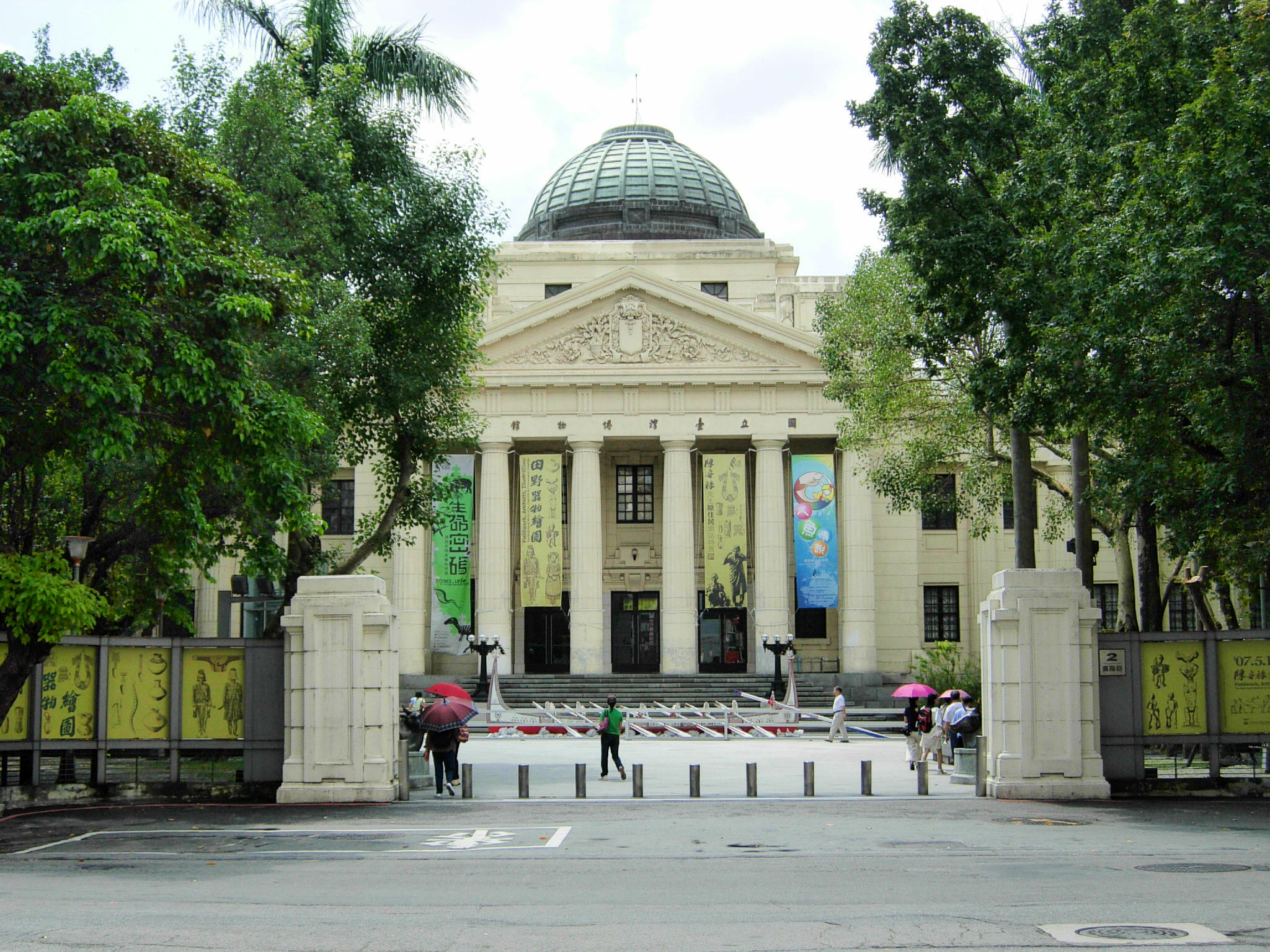
- Established: 24 October 1908 (original building); 1915 (current building)
- Location: Zhongzheng, Taipei, Taiwan
- Coordinates: 25.04275369637105°N 121.51503772096355°E
- Type: National museum
- Director: Hung Shih-yu (洪世佑(Pe̍h-ōe-jī: Âng Sè-iū))
- Curator: Chen Chiming (陳濟民(Pe̍h-ōe-jī: Tân Chē-bîn))
- Website: www.ntm.gov.tw/en/

National monument of Taiwan
- Official name: 臺灣總督府博物館(Pe̍h-ōe-jī: Tâi-oân Chóng-tok-hú Phok-bu̍t-koán)
- Type: Other
- Designated: 10 June 1998

The National Taiwan Museum (NTM; Chinese: 國立臺灣博物館; pinyin: Guólì Táiwān Bówùguǎn; Pe̍h-ōe-jī: Kok-li̍p Tâi-oân Phok-bu̍t-koán), established in 1908, is the oldest museum in Taiwan. It was founded by the colonial government during Taiwan's period of Japanese rule. The museum is located in Zhongzheng District, Taipei.

== History ==
Established in 1908, the museum is the oldest in Taiwan. The colonial government of Japan set up the Taiwan Governor Museum (臺灣總督府民政部殖產局附屬博物館(Pe̍h-ōe-jī: Tâi-oân Chóng-tok-hú Bîn-chèng-pō͘ Si̍t-sán-kio̍k Hù-sio̍k Phok-bu̍t-koán)), which officially opened on 24 October 1908, to commemorate the inauguration of the North-South Railway. The museum had a collection of over 10,000 items in its initial stages. In 1915, the new building of the museum in Taihoku New Park was inaugurated and became one of the major public buildings during Japanese rule.

In 1935 it was used to house the First Cultural Pavilion at The Taiwan Exposition: In Commemoration of the First Forty Years of Colonial Rule.

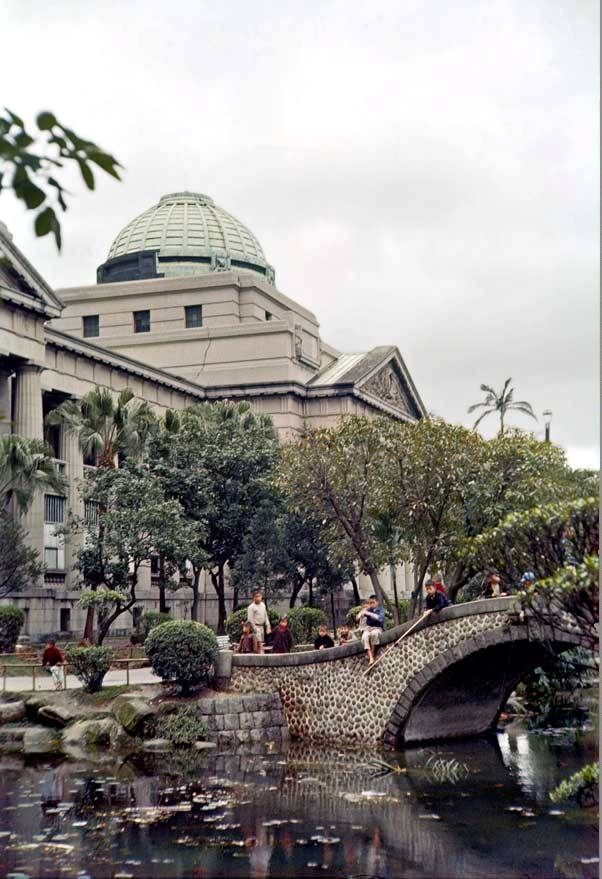
National Taiwan Museum circa 1957–1959

After the handover of Taiwan from Japan to the Republic of China, the Department of Education of the Taiwan Provincial Government took over the administration of the museum in 1949 and renamed it Taiwan Provincial Museum until 1999. The museum underwent two major renovations in 1961 and 1994 respectively. Since 1999, the museum has been administered by the Central Government and renamed "National Taiwan Museum." Throughout the years of war and political transition and after twice being renamed, it stands as the only museum established during the colonial years, which is still in operation on its original site.

In 1998, the Ministry of the Interior declared the museum a "National Heritage." On 21 November 2017, the museum reopened after two months of renovation works.

== Capital Museums System ==
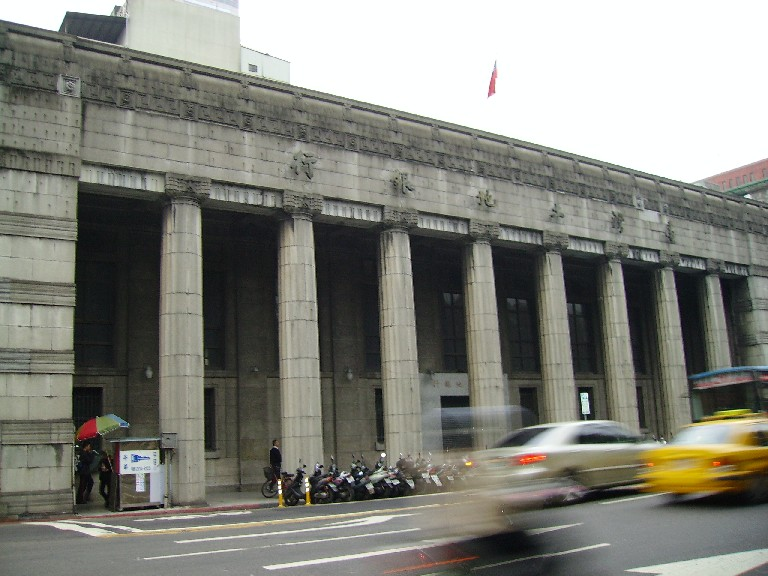
Land Bank Exhibition Hall

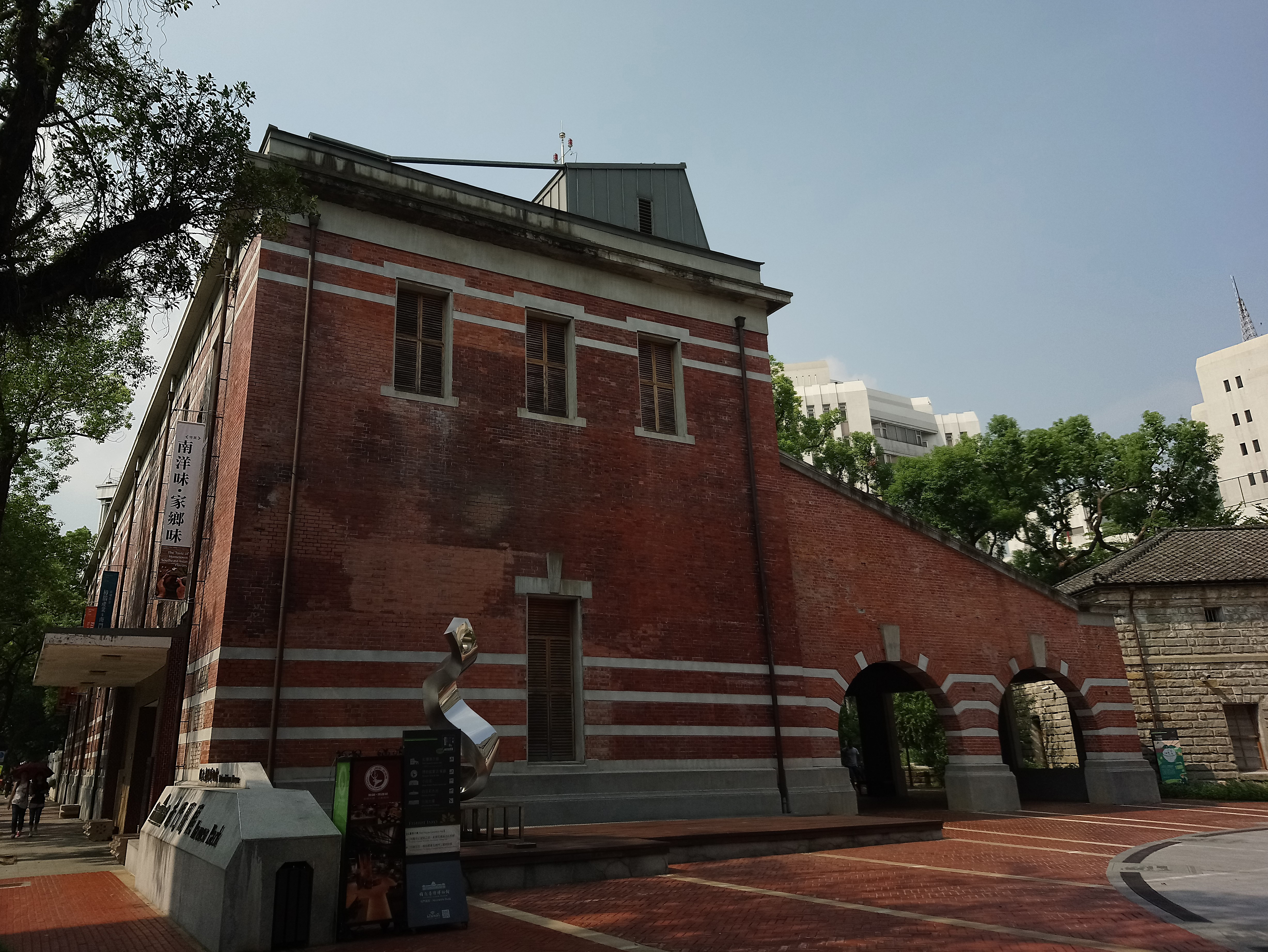
Nanmen Park

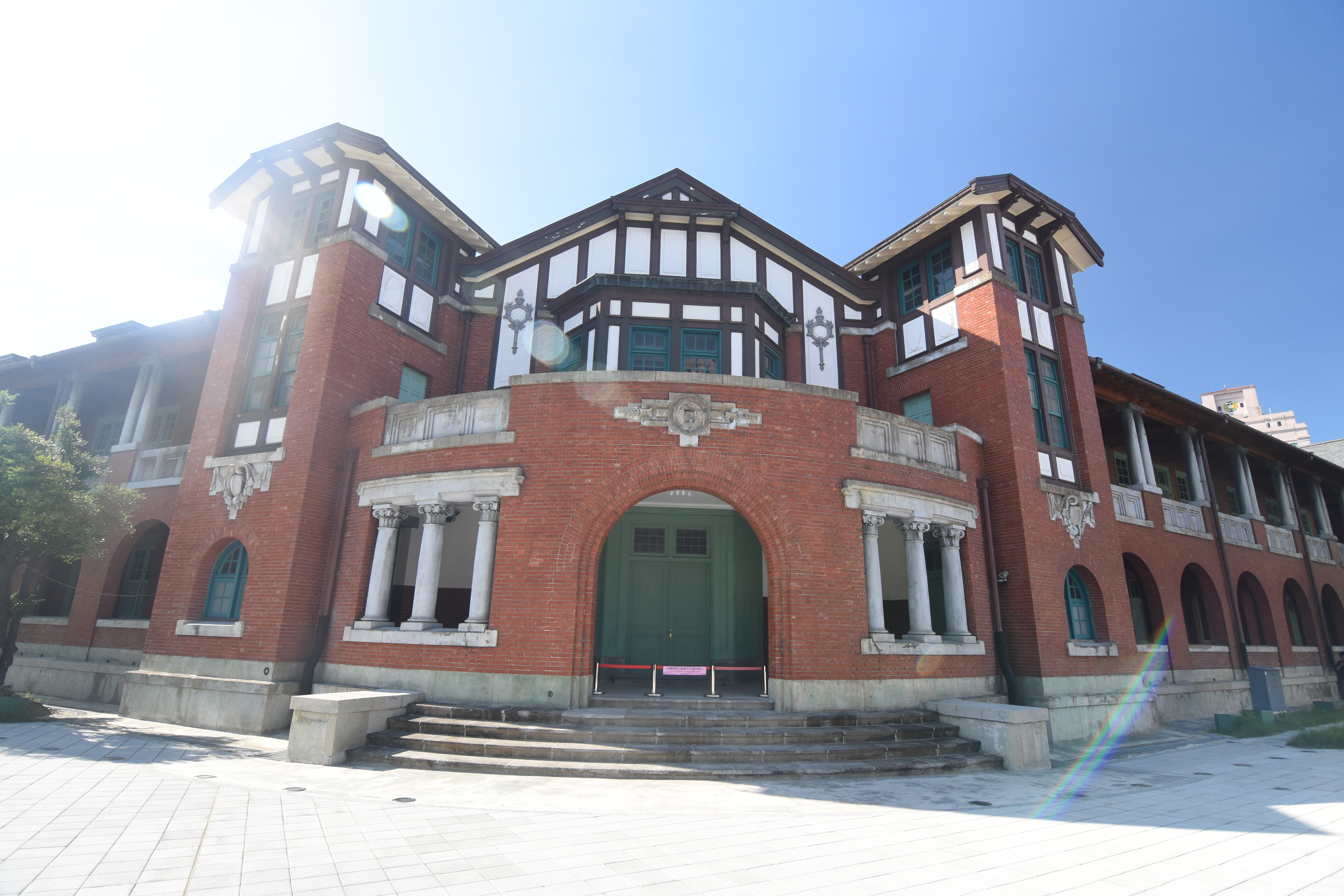
Railway Department Park

The Council for Cultural Affairs started a project in 2005 to combine the National Taiwan Museum with nearby historical sites into the "Capital Museums System".

The National Taiwan Museum System currently consists of 4 museums:

- National Taiwan Museum
- Land Bank Exhibition Hall: Formerly the head office of the Land Bank of Taiwan, in the old Nippon Kangyo Bank building (勸業銀行舊廈(Pe̍h-ōe-jī: Khoàn-gia̍p Gîn-hâng Kū-hā)). Designated as a natural history museum.
- Nanmen Park: The camphor factory of the Monopoly Bureau (專賣局舊樟腦工廠(Pe̍h-ōe-jī: Choan-bōe-kio̍k Chiuⁿ-náu Kang-chhiúⁿ)). Renovation completed in 1990, highlights Taiwan industrial history with exhibits on camphor-processing and modern industry.
- Railway Department Park: On the site of the former Railway Department of the Transportation Administration (台灣總督府交通局鐵道部(Pe̍h-ōe-jī: Tâi-oân Chóng-tok-hú Kau-thong-kio̍k Thih-tō-pō͘)), features exhibitions on Taiwan's railway history.

The following historical buildings will also be restored and added to the system as museums:

- Monopoly Bureau (臺灣總督府專賣局(Pe̍h-ōe-jī: Tâi-oân Chóng-tok-hú Choan-bōe-kio̍k)): Currently the head office of the Taiwan Tobacco and Liquor Corporation, it will be used for industry exhibition in the future.
- The old Mitsui Bussan Company building (三井物產株式會社舊廈(Pe̍h-ōe-jī: Sam-chéⁿ Bu̍t-sán Chu-sek Hōe-siā Kū-hā))

== Exhibitions ==
The museum has witnessed Taiwan's history and recorded its natural and humanitarian developments. Through this window, one may catch a glimpse of Taiwan's evolution with regard to the fields of earth sciences, humanitarian developments, zoology, and botany.

The museum maintains its original scale, with five departments — anthropology, earth sciences, zoology, botany and education. The collection features specimens of Taiwan's indigenous animals and plants as well as cultural artifacts. Through its regular exhibitions and special exhibitions, publications and various educational programs, the museum is serving the public as an educational establishment.

In February 2021, an exhibition titled "Exploring Taiwan" opened at the museum. The exhibition features over 300 cultural and historic items divided into two parts: People of Taiwan and Nature of Taiwan, telling the story of the nation's past, culture and environment. The exhibition will continue until 31 December 2026.

- Special exhibitions
- International exhibitions
- Touring exhibitions: every year, the museum organizes exhibition tours selected from among the special exhibitions that are suitable for showing in natural history educational halls around the island.
- Permanent exhibitions:
  - Section on Taiwan's pre-history culture.
  - Section on Taiwan's indigenous culture.
- Outdoor exhibitions: includes bronze buffaloes, Collection of Stone Tablets, relics of the Giant Stone Culture, old cannons, and old locomotives.

== Transportation ==
The museum is accessible within walking distance northwest from NTU Hospital Station of the Taipei Metro.

== See also ==
- List of museums in Taiwan
- National Palace Museum
- National Museum of History (Taiwan)
- Presidential and Vice-Presidential Artifacts Museum
- Taiwan Theater Museum
- Taipei Fine Arts Museum
- 228 Peace Memorial Park
