= BHF Kleinwort Benson Group =

French financial services group

- Logo used until March 2015
- Company type: Subsidiary
- Industry: Financial services
- Founded: 1786 (via Kleinwort Benson)
- Headquarters: Brussels, Belgium
- Key people: Timothy C. Collins (Founder); Leonhard Fischer (CEO)
- Parent: Amundi, Société Générale
- Subsidiaries: Arecon; Quirin Bank; Shaklee; SIGMAXYZ Inc

BHF Kleinwort Benson Group (formerly RHJ International) was a French financial services group, formerly listed on the Euronext stock exchange in Belgium, with principal activities in wealth management, asset management and merchant banking. It was acquired by Oddo & Cie in 2016 and was later sold in the year to Amundi and Société Générale.

In line with its strategy to transform itself into a focused financial services group, RHJI had also made a number of divestments from its legacy industrial portfolio and purchases of financial services companies during the 2010s.

== History ==
Prior to being listed on the Euronext the company was a private equity fund run by Ripplewood Holdings. Timothy C. Collins, the founder of Ripplewood, was one of the company's largest shareholders and a director of the company. In October 2009, the company announced it would acquire Kleinwort Benson from Commerzbank AG for £225 million. This transaction closed in July 2010. Earlier in his career, RHJI's CEO, Leonhard Fischer had worked in senior positions for Dresdner Bank AG, the previous owner of Kleinwort Benson.

Fischer and his senior management team transformed RHJI into a focused financial services group by leveraging Kleinwort Benson's strong brand and growing its well-capitalized private banking and investment management businesses. In line with this transformation strategy, RHJI acquired KBC Asset Management Ltd in October 2010 for €24 million, renaming it Kleinwort Benson Investors, and Close Offshore Group in June 2011 for £29 million, bringing both of these acquisitions together under the Kleinwort Benson brand.

In July 2011, RHJI announced that its Kleinwort Benson Group subsidiary was in exclusive negotiations with Deutsche Bank regarding a potential acquisition of BHF Bank, one of Germany's strongest banking brands, with operations in private banking, asset management, financial markets and corporate banking. In June 2012, RHJI announced that it had secured the support of co-investors to finance the acquisition and, in September 2012, announced that it had reached agreement with Deutsche Bank to acquire BHF-Bank for €384 million.

In line with its strategy to transform itself into a focused financial services group, RHJI also made a number of divestments from its legacy industrial portfolio. These included the sale of Niles Co. Ltd for $188 million in June 2011 and of Asahi Tec for €142 million and Phoenix Seagaia for €3.7 million in early 2012.

In March 2015, shareholders approved a name change to "BHF Kleinwort Benson Group". It was acquired by Oddo & Cie in early 2016 and was later sold in the year to Amundi and Société Générale.

== See also ==
- Ripplewood Holdings
