= Ripplewood Holdings =

American private equity firm

- Type: Private
- Industry: Private equity
- Founded: 1995; 31 years ago
- Founder: Tim Collins (financier)
- Headquarters: One Rockefeller Plaza; New York, New York, United States
- Products: Leveraged buyout, Growth capital, Late stage venture capital
- Total assets: $10 billion

Ripplewood is an American private equity firm based in New York City that focuses on leveraged buyouts, late stage venture, growth capital, management buyouts, leveraged recapitalizations and other illiquid investments.

Ripplewood was founded by its current CEO, Tim Collins. Managing partners include Lawrence Lavine, Harris Williams and Michael C. Duran. The company's main interests range from telecommunications to banking to entertainment. The firm manages more than $10 billion in capital.

== History ==
Founded in 1995, Ripplewood manages about $4.0 billion in four institutional private equity funds: Ripplewood Partners, L.P.; Ripplewood Partners II, L.P.; RHJ International, L.P. and New LTCB Partners C.V. The company invests in education publishing, telecom, automotive retail, specialty chemicals, consumer products & food manufacturing, and industrial products.

Ripplewood has invested in nearly a dozen industry groups and in companies with more than $20 billion of revenue. It has led several of the largest private equity transactions, including its takeover of the Long-Term Credit Bank, renamed Shinsei Bank, which helped restructure the Japanese economy.

== Investments ==
- Shinsei Bank
- Honsel International Technologies
- Kraton Polymers
- Japan Telecom
- Columbia Music Entertainment
- Denon
- Lillian Vernon
- Little Chef
- Old HB - known to the public as "Hostess Brands" and "Twinkies" - filed for bankruptcy
- The Reader's Digest Association (the company filed for bankruptcy in August 2009 and Ripplewood lost its entire investment)
- SAFT Power Systems (now renamed as AEG Power Solutions (acquired from Alcatel)
- Edwards Fine Foods (sold to Schwan Food Company in 2001)

== See also ==
- RHJ International
