= Academia Historica =

Taiwanese research institute and museum

Coordinates: 25.0399°N 121.5107°E

- 國史館
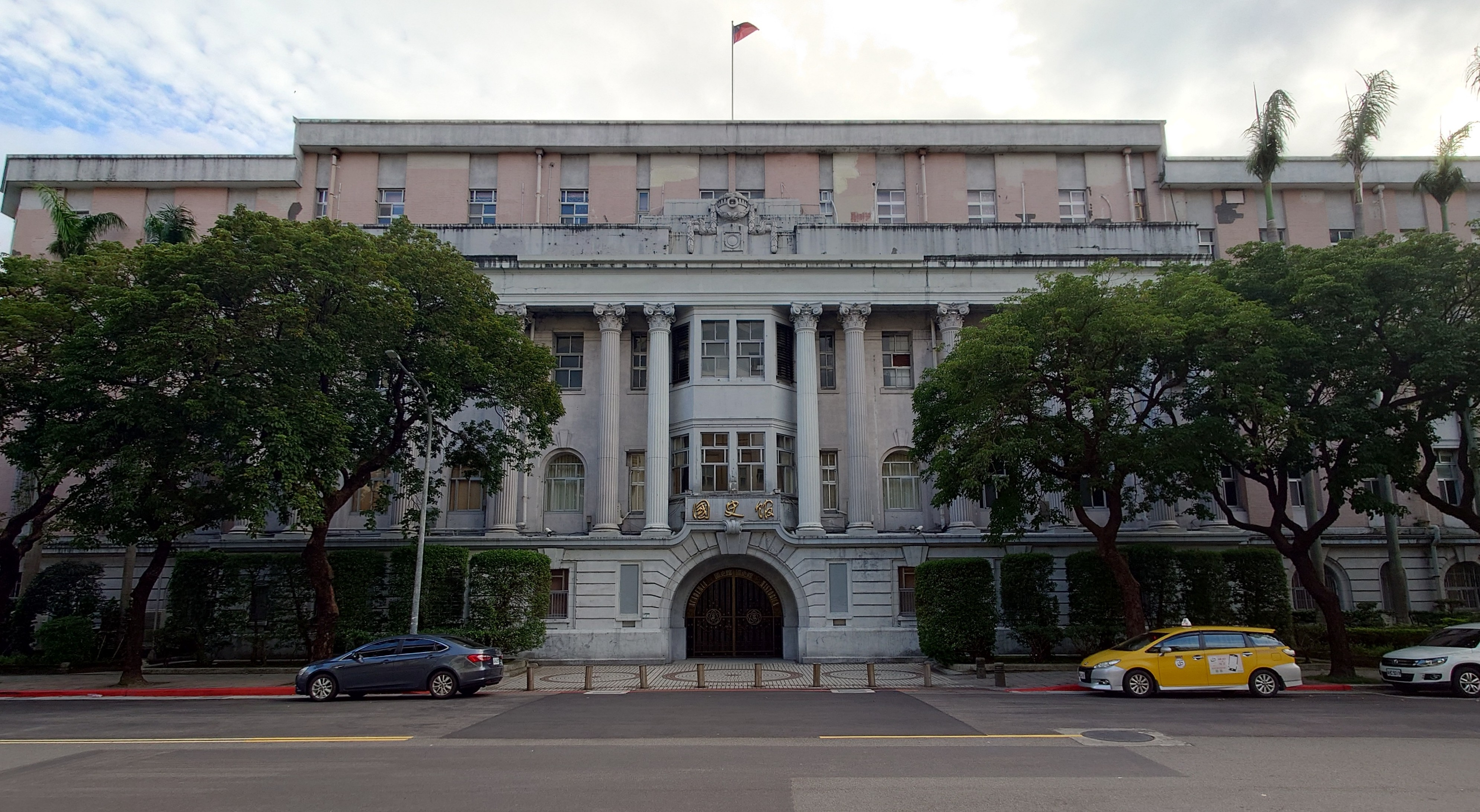
- Academia Historica building in Taipei

Agency overview
- Formed: 20 January 1947
- Jurisdiction: Republic of China
- Headquarters: Zhongzheng, Taipei, Taiwan
- Parent agency: Office of the President
- Child agencies: Taiwan Historica; Presidential and Vice-Presidential Artifacts Museum
- Website: drnh.gov.tw

Academia Historica (Chinese: 國史館; pinyin: Guóshǐ guǎn) is the national institution of historical research of the Republic of China (Taiwan). Founded in Nanjing in 1947 and re-established in Taiwan in 1957, the institution is under the direct administration of the Office of the President. The institution is tasked with recording national history, collecting, compiling, and preserving historical collections, as well as conserving the relics associated with the Presidents and Vice Presidents of the Republic of China.

== History ==
=== 1914–1928: Beijing ===
Following the 1911 Revolution, 97 revolutionary leaders wrote to the acting president, Sun Yat-sen, recommending the establishment of a national historical institution to document the revolution's history. In response, Academia Historica was founded in Beijing in 1914 under President Yuan Shikai. However, the institution faced significant challenges after 1915 due to director Wang Kaiyun's advocacy for a monarchy, which disrupted its operations. In 1917, the Duan Qirui administration shut it down, merging it into Peking University as the National History Compilation Office, headed by Cai Yuanpei. This office was elevated to a national institution in 1919, with Tu Fengshu as director, When it was renamed Academia Historica in 1927, Ke Shaomin was named its director. It was subsequently dissolved in 1928 with the fall of the Beiyang government during the Northern Expedition.

=== 1947–1949: Nanjing ===
In August 1931, the ministries of the Interior and Education submitted a proposal to the Executive Yuan to establish the Preparatory Office for Academia Historica under the two ministries. This office was eventually established in February 1940 in Chongqing, which was relocated to Nanjing in 1946, following the Japanese surrender. The legislation of the institution was passed in 1947 and the office was formally established in 1947. In 1948, due to the Chinese Civil War, the institution relocated its files and documents first to Shanghai, and then Guangzhou, Guilin and Chongqing, before the institution dissolved in 1949. Based on Academia Historica documents, the Communist government founded Second Historical Archives of China.

=== Since 1957: Taiwan ===
Most members and resources of Academia Historica were unable to retreat to Taiwan in 1949, and between 1947 and 1951, three presidents of the institution–Zhang Ji, Dai Jitao, and Ju Zheng–died in office, leading to a suspension of operations due to poor leadership. From 1950, the institution's functions were temporarily managed by the Kuomintang (KMT)'s History Compilation Office until Academia Historica was re-established in Taipei.

In 1956, the Legislative Yuan amended the governing authority of Academia Historica, transferring oversight from the Nationalist Government to the President, in line with constitutional changes. In 1957, following the Legislative Yuan's recommendation and under President Chiang Kai-shek's directive, Academia Historica was reopened in Taipei, with construction of archival warehouses beginning in Xindian. Government agencies started transferring documents to Academia Historica. In 1973, the Executive Yuan mandated that all central and local government agencies annually transfer their outdated or mainland-era documents to Academia Historica.

In 2002, a presidential decree changed the affiliation of Taiwan Historica, placing it under the jurisdiction of Academia Historica instead of the Taiwan Provincial Government. In 2004, the institution became responsible for conserving the relics of Presidents and vice-presidents of the Republic of China. In 2007, the institution moved into the former Ministry of Transportation and Communications building, with its old building becoming Presidential and Vice-Presidential Artifacts Museum in 2010.

== Controversies ==
=== National identity ===
In December 2010, Academia Historica conducted an online election to select the top 100 figures of the Republic of China. The inclusion of Communist Chinese leaders such as Mao Zedong and Deng Xiaoping as candidates sparked political controversy, which ultimately led to the resignation of Lin Man-houng, the president of the institution.

On 7 August 2022, Academia Historica's Facebook page published a post referencing a lecture by Hsu Ching-hsiung, former president of the Taiwan Constitutional Law Society, given in the institution's online forum. In his lecture, Hsu claimed that the United Nations and the international community recognise the Republic of China as represented and succeeded by the Beijing government. This statement sparked controversy, with the opposition party Kuomintang (KMT) questioning whether Hsu's remarks reflected the views of President Tsai Ing-wen. Later that night, Academia Historica president Chen Yi-shen issued a statement clarifying that while the Republic of China during the Chiang Kai-shek and Chiang Ching-kuo era and the one post-President Lee Teng-hui are “entities with the same name but different nature,” he had expressed disagreement during Hsu's lecture. Chen emphasised that Hsu's comments did not represent Academia Historica's stance.

=== Censorship ===
On 1 August 2016, the institution restricted access to the archives, which were previously fully open, to only citizens of the Republic of China and certain foreign individuals, and introduced a review and appointment system. This move sparked opposition from Taiwanese academia, leading to a joint petition of protest.

On 15 December 2017, DPP legislator Tuan Yi-kang stated that Academia Historica was the most absurd institution of the Republic of China, remarking, "In this age, it is unbelievable that government-led historiography still exists." He announced plans to propose a legislative amendment to merge Academia Historica with the National Archives Administration, which was agreed by the Academia Historica president Wu Mi-cha. On 14 March 2018, New Power Party legislator Freddy Lim proposed an amendment, aiming to merge Academia Historica with the National Archives Administration.

On 24 February 2021, Shih Cheng-feng, a professor at National Dong Hwa University, commented that Academia Historica had shown partisan bias under both KMT and DPP administrations, which was a major reason for public distrust.

== See also ==
- First Historical Archives of China, historical archives of Imperial China (before 1912)
