= SBI Group =

Parent company of the SBI group (Japanese financial conglomerate)

SBI Holdings

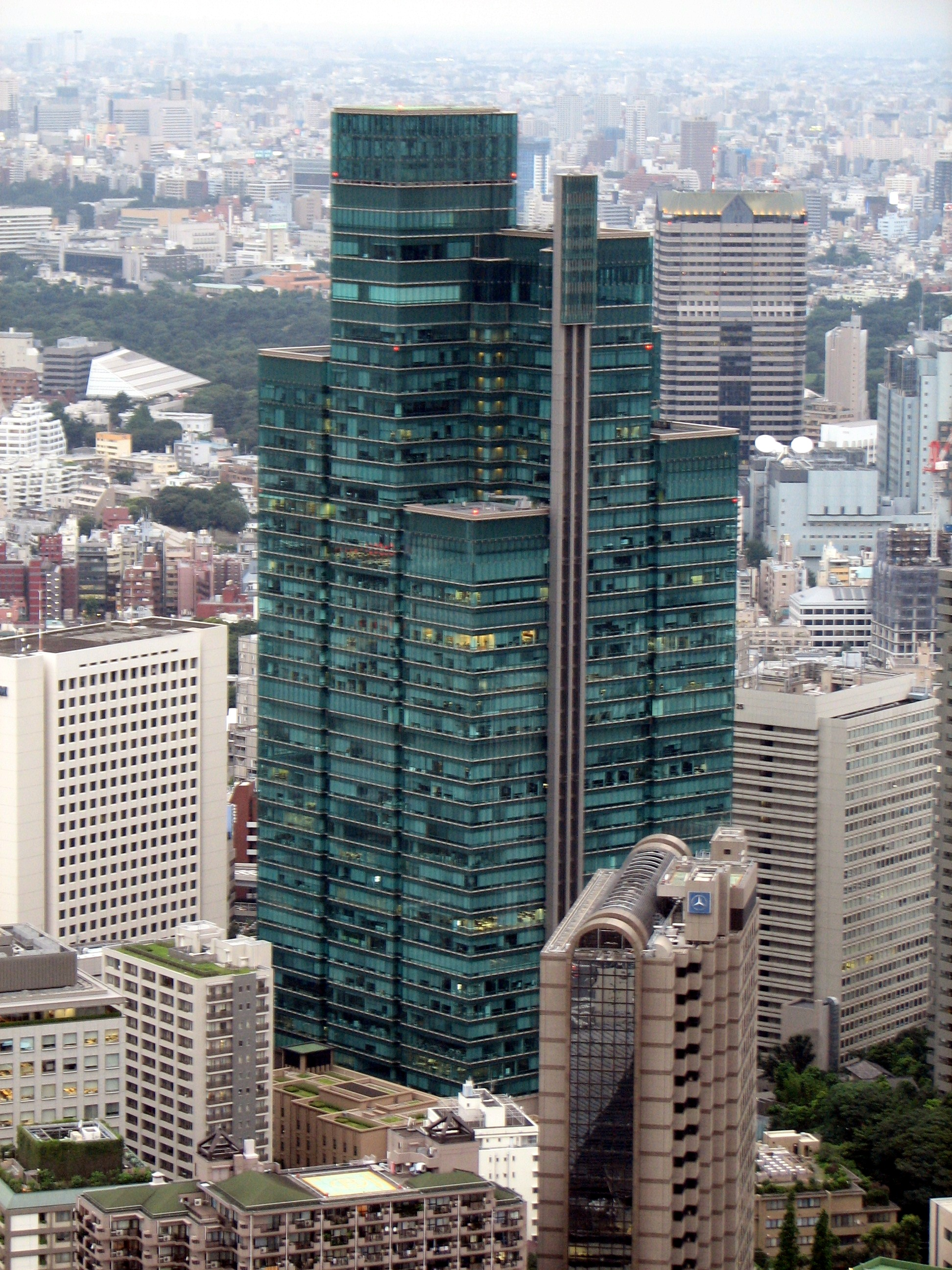
- The headquarters of SBI Group in the 13th–14th, 17th–23rd floors of the Izumi Garden Tower, Roppongi district, Tokyo, Japan
- Type: Public company
- Traded as: TYO: 8473
- Industry: Financial services
- Founded: 1999 as SoftBank Investment Co., Ltd. (became fully independent from Softbank in 2006)
- Headquarters: Tokyo, Japan
- Key people: Yoshitaka Kitao (chairman, President and CEO)
- Services: Asset Management | Financial Services |
- Revenue: 1,210,504 million yen (fiscal year ending March 2024)
- Operating income: Consolidated: 113,616 million yen (fiscal year ending March 2024)
- Number of employees: Consolidated: 18756 (as of March 31, 2023)
- Subsidiaries: See group companies
- Website: www.sbigroup.co.jp

SBI Holdings, Inc., formerly the SoftBank Investment Co., Ltd., and sometimes referred to as Strategic Business Innovator Group (TYO: 8473), is a financial services holdings corporation based in Tokyo, Japan. It is the primary holdings company of the SBI Group, one of the largest financial services conglomerates in Japan, with over 635 subsidiaries.

Some of the most prominent subsidiaries are SBI Securities, SBI Shinsei Bank and SBI Investments.

The company provides financial services in a wide range of categories, including securities, asset management, banking and insurance and has formed an Internet-based financial conglomerate. The group also has a biotechnology-related business line which develops cosmetics, health foods and drug discovery. Furthermore, the group operates the business school SBI Graduate School. SBI is listed on the first section of the Tokyo Stock Exchange and Osaka Securities Exchange.

In 2022, the company entered into a comprehensive capital and business alliance with Sumitomo Mitsui Financial Group (SMFG) (commonly known as the "SMBC-SBI Alliance"), and received investment from SMFG.

== Overview ==
Founded in 1999, the company was initially part of the Softbank group. The company was listed on the Osaka Stock Exchange in December 2000 and subsequently on the Tokyo Stock Exchange in 2002. The SBI Group became completely independent from Softbank in 2006. The Financial Services Business is based on an Internet-based financial ecosystem, and undertakes a broad range of financial services, including securities, banking and insurance. At the Asset Management Business, the group conducts investments into and incubation of startup companies, and through the biotechnology-related business, it undertakes the R&D and manufacturing of pharmaceuticals, health foods and other products. The company stated in its 2020 annual report that it would pursue business growth by actively promoting the Open Alliance initiative. This involves developing win-win relationships with companies that have advanced technologies in areas such as fintech, AI, blockchain, and quantum computing, along with companies in different industries. The company's goal is to sustainably increase the corporate value and social value of the SBI Group through self-evolution and co-creation of value with a wide range of companies".

In 2019, SBI Holdings announced its plans to create a 4th Japanese megabank by consolidating several Japanese regional banks (up to 10) into the group and connecting them to SBI's technological pool.

== History ==
- 1999
  - April - As a result of a business reorganization accompanying the conversion of SoftBank Corp. (SoftBank Group Corp. as of Jan 2021) into a pure holding company, Softbank Finance Corporation became an independent company to oversee financial-related business activities.
  - July - Established as SOFTBANK INVESTMENT CORPORATION; start of venture capital business.
  - Oct. - E*TRADE SECURITIES Co., Ltd. (currently SBI SECURITIES Co., Ltd.) commenced Internet trading services.
  - Nov - Softbank Ventures Inc. (currently SBI Investment Co., Ltd.) became a wholly owned consolidated subsidiary.
- 2000
  - December 15 - The company was listed on JASDAQ (merged with Osaka Securities Exchange in 2010)
- 2002
  - February 15 - Tokyo Stock Exchange listed on the First Section of the market
  - November 27- Listed on the First Section of the Osaka Securities Exchange
- 2003
  - June 2- E-Trade Co., Ltd. merged
- 2004
  - March 16- Merged with SBI Real Estate Co., Ltd.
- 2005
  - July 1 - Changed name to SBI Holdings, Inc., and transitioned to a holding company structure.
- 2006
  - Merged with SBI Partners Co., Ltd. and Finance All Corp.
  - August - A wholly owned subsidiary of SoftBank Corp. (name as of Jan 2021: SoftBank Group Corp.) sold its entire stake in SBI Holdings, Inc.
- 2007
  - August - SBI Japannext Co., Ltd. (currently Japannext Co., Ltd.) began operation of a proprietary trading system (PTS).
  - September - SBI Sumishin Net Bank, Ltd. commenced operations.
- 2008
  - January - SBI Insurance Co., Ltd. commenced operations
  - July - SBI E*TRADE SECURITIES Co., Ltd. changed its name to SBI SECURITIES Co., Ltd
  - November - SBI Sumishin Net Bank, Ltd. commenced business
- 2011
  - April 14 - Hong Kong Stock Exchange listed on the ( SEHK : 6488 )
  - On April 27, 2011, SBI Securities, a unit of SBI Holdings, agreed to acquire a 25 percent stake in PT BNI Securities, a subsidiary company of Bank Negara Indonesia for Rp.114 billion ($16.70 million).
  - May- Opened a representative office in Kuala Lumpur, the capital of Malaysia
- 2012
  - March - China Dalian, China business management company changed name to "思佰益 Investment Co., Ltd. (English name: SBI (China) Co., Ltd. )"
  - April - SBI ALApromo Co., Ltd., commenced business.
  - May - SBI FXTRADE Co., Ltd., commenced business.
- 2014
  - June 25- Delisted from the Hong Kong Stock Exchange.
- 2015
  - October - SBI Thai Online Securities Co., Ltd., a first pure-play online securities company in Thailand, commenced business.
- 2016
  - November—Established "SBI Virtual Currencies Co., Ltd." (name in 2021: SBI VC Trade Co., Ltd.), which provides virtual currency exchange and trading services.
- 2017
  - October-Established a joint holding company " JAL SBI FinTech " to provide new services utilizing Japan Airlines and FinTech.
- 2018
  - September—Subsidiary SBI Insurance Group Co., Ltd. is listed on the Tokyo Stock Exchange Mothers.
- 2019
  - April - SBI NEOMOBILE SECURITIES Co., Ltd. established by SBI SECURITIES and CCC Marketing Co., Ltd., commenced business.
  - May - Established a representative office in Philippines.
  - October - Formed business alliance with Z Holdings Group in the Financial Services Business.
  - November - Established Strategic Business Innovator Berlin GmbH., a subsidiary in Germany
- 2020
  - April - Acquired Cambodian microfinance institution SBI LY HOUR BANK PLC. (formerly Ly Hour Microfinance Institution PLC.) and obtained a banking license.
  - April - Concluded basic agreement with the SMBC Group on a strategic capital and business alliance.
  - October- Acquired all shares of Livestar Securities, making it a wholly owned subsidiary of the intermediate holding company SBI Financial Services. Acquired all shares of TaoTao Inc., which operates the crypto asset exchange TAOTAO, and made it a wholly owned subsidiary.
  - December - SBI Digital Asset Holdings Co., Ltd., a subsidiary of SBI Holdings, announces with the SIX group Plans for Singapore-Based Joint Exchange Venture
- 2021
  - May - Signed a capital and business alliance with the Bank of Tsukuba.
  - September - TOB for Shinsei Bank.
  - December - 12/17 --Shinsei Bank became a consolidated subsidiary.
- 2022
  - May 12 - Officially announced a capital and business alliance with Daiko Bank
  - 10/11 --Announced that the Bank Holding Company related to SBI Regional Bank Holdings was approved by the Financial Services Agency.
- 2023
  - July 5 - SBI Holdings announced that it has reached a basic agreement with Powerchip Semiconductor Manufacturing Corporation (PSMC), a major foundry (semiconductor contract manufacturing) in Taiwan, to establish a preparatory company for the establishment of a semiconductor factory in Japan.

== See also ==
- List of banks in South Korea
