= Land Bank of Taiwan =

State-owned bank in Taiwan

Land Bank of Taiwan Co., Ltd.
- Logo of Land Bank of Taiwan

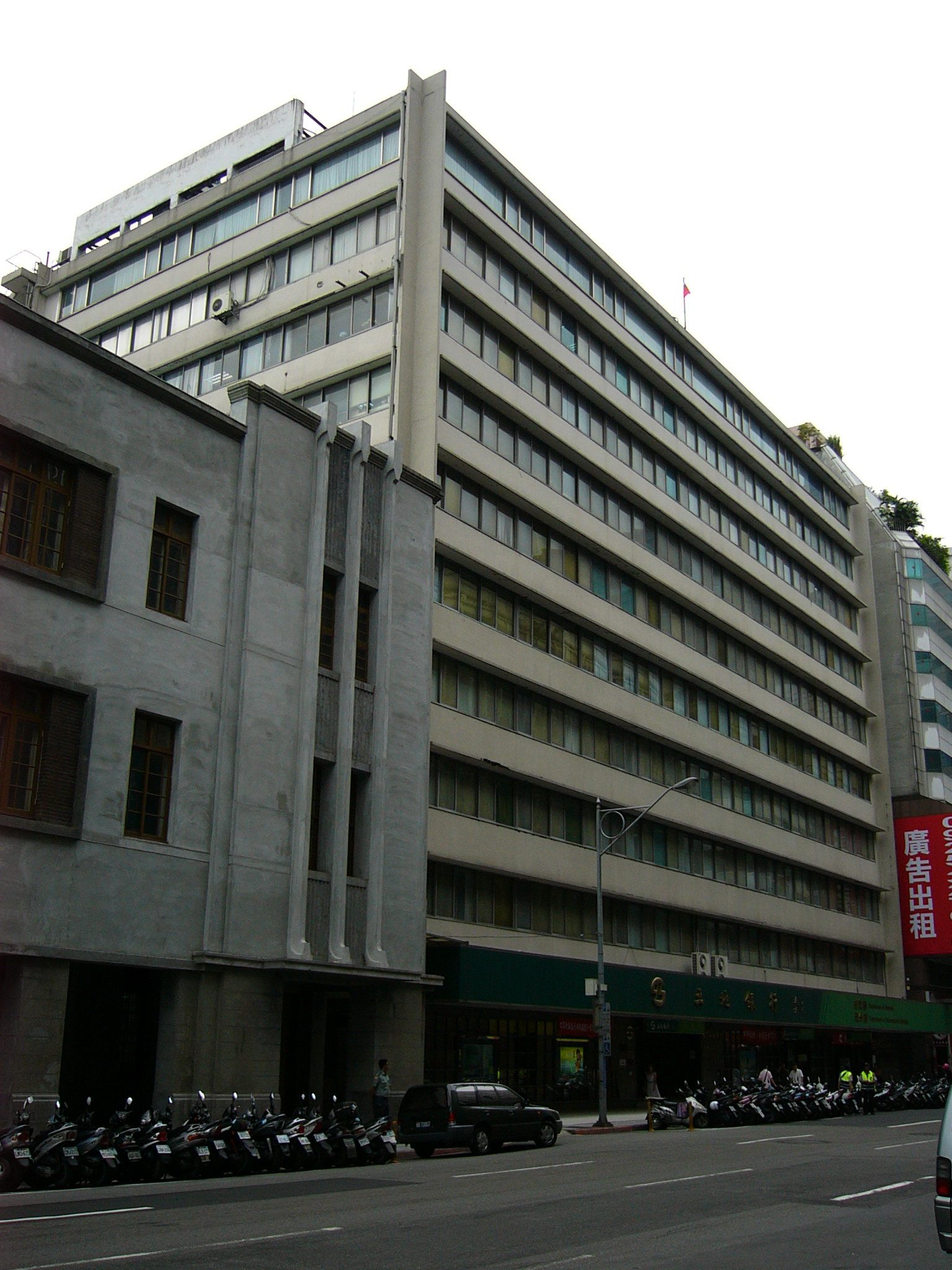
- Trade name: Land Bank of Taiwan
- Native name: 臺灣土地銀行
- Type: Public company, bank
- Founded: 1 September 1946
- Headquarters: Zhongzheng, Taipei, Taiwan
- Key people: Hsieh, Chuan-Chuan (Chairperson); He, Ying-Ming (President)
- Parent: Ministry of Finance (Taiwan)
- Website: www.landbank.com.tw

Land Bank of Taiwan (LBOT; Chinese: 臺灣土地銀行; pinyin: Táiwān Tǔdì Yínháng; Pe̍h-ōe-jī: Tâi-ôan-thó͘-tē-gîn-hâng) is a wholly state-owned bank in Taiwan.

== History ==
It was owned by the government before its downsizing on December 21, 1998, when it was transferred to the jurisdiction of the Executive Yuan.

It is the only bank designated by the ROC government as a specialised bank for handling real estate and agricultural credit. Its objective is to develop national economic construction in coordination with the implementation of the government's housing, agricultural, and land policies.

The history of the Land Museum of Taiwan dates from 1945 and the end of World War II. To facilitate the implementation of land policies such as land-rights equalization and the land-to-the-tiller program in Taiwan, the ROC government allocated 60 million dollars from the national treasury and took over the five branches of the Nippon Kangyo Bank (NKB) set up in Taipei, Hsinchu, Taichung, Tainan, and Kaohsiung during Japanese rule. The “Land Bank of Taiwan” was established in accordance with ROC law on 1 September 1946.

In May 1985, the Land Bank of Taiwan became qualified as a juristic person according to Article 52 of the Banking Act; on 21 December 1998, it became a state-run organization upon implementation of the Province Simplification Statute; on 1 July 2003, it was reorganized as the "Land Bank of Taiwan Co., Ltd." On 21 May 2004, it was transformed into a public company to prepare for initial public offering on privatization.

== Organisational structure ==
The LBOT's managerial structure consists of the head office with 26 units, 149 domestic branches (excluding OBU) in Taiwan, and 8 overseas branches and offices.

The Overseas Branches and Offices are LBOT Los Angeles Branch, LBOT New York Branch, LBOT Singapore Branch, LBOT Hong Kong Branch, LBOT Shanghai Branch, LBOT TianJin Branch, LBOT Wuhan Branch and LBOT Kuala Lumpur Representative Office in Malaysia.

=== Branches ===
- Historical Museum of the Land of Taiwan, part of National Taiwan Museum(active)
- Land Bank of Taiwan, Tainan Branch(non-active)

== Credit ratings ==
Taiwan Ratings, JUL 12 2022: twAA+, Outlook: Stable

Moody’s Investors Service, SEP 23 2022: Aa3, Outlook:Stable

Standard & Poor’s (S&P), JUL 12 2022: A−, Outlook:Stable

== See also ==
- Taiwan Land Reform Museum
- National Taiwan Museum
- List of banks in Taiwan
- Economy of Taiwan
- List of companies of Taiwan
