= Tim Collins (financier) =

American businessman (born 1956)

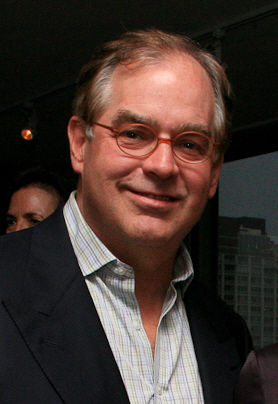
- Tim Collins in New York, May 2011
- Born: Timothy C. Collins; 1956 (age 69–70); Frankfort, Kentucky, U.S.
- Citizenship: American
- Education: DePauw University (BA); Yale University (MBA)
- Occupations: Business executive, investor
- Title: CEO and managing director, Ripplewood Holdings LLC
- Board member of: Citigroup

Timothy C. Collins (born 1956) is an American entrepreneur and business executive. He is the founder and chief executive of Ripplewood Holdings LLC. He has also been a member of the board of directors of Citigroup. Collins is a director of several public companies as well as some of Ripplewood's private portfolio companies.

== Early life and education ==
Collins was born in 1956 in Frankfort, Kentucky. He has a B.A. degree in philosophy from DePauw University (1978), and an MBA from Yale School of Management.

== Career ==
Collins began his career at Cummins Engine Company, where he worked in finance, marketing, and manufacturing. From 1981 to 1984, he worked with the management consulting firm of Booz & Company, specializing in strategic and operational assignments with major industrial and financial firms. He became a vice president at Lazard Frères in New York, then managed Onex Corporation’s New York office. Collins has also served on the boards of several companies, including Asbury Automotive, Shinsei Bank, Advanced Auto, Rental Services Corp.

Collins was named one of the “25 Stars of Asia: Leaders at the Forefront of Change” by BusinessWeek magazine in 2004.

=== Public service ===
He is involved in several not-for-profit and public sector activities, including the U.S.-Japan Business Council, the Trilateral Commission, the U.S.-Japan Private Sector/Government Commission, Yale Divinity School advisory board, American Friends of the British Museum, Yaddo, the United Board for Christian Higher Education in Asia, Trout Unlimited, and Lenox Hill Neighborhood House and the Tony Blair Faith Foundation.

In 2012, Collins was appointed chairman of the Yale School of Management Board of Advisors.

== Personal life ==
Collins is married and has three sons.
