= Taiwan Historica =

Academic institution in Nantou County, Taiwan

Coordinates: 23°56′13.2″N 120°42′02.5″E

- 國史館臺灣文獻館
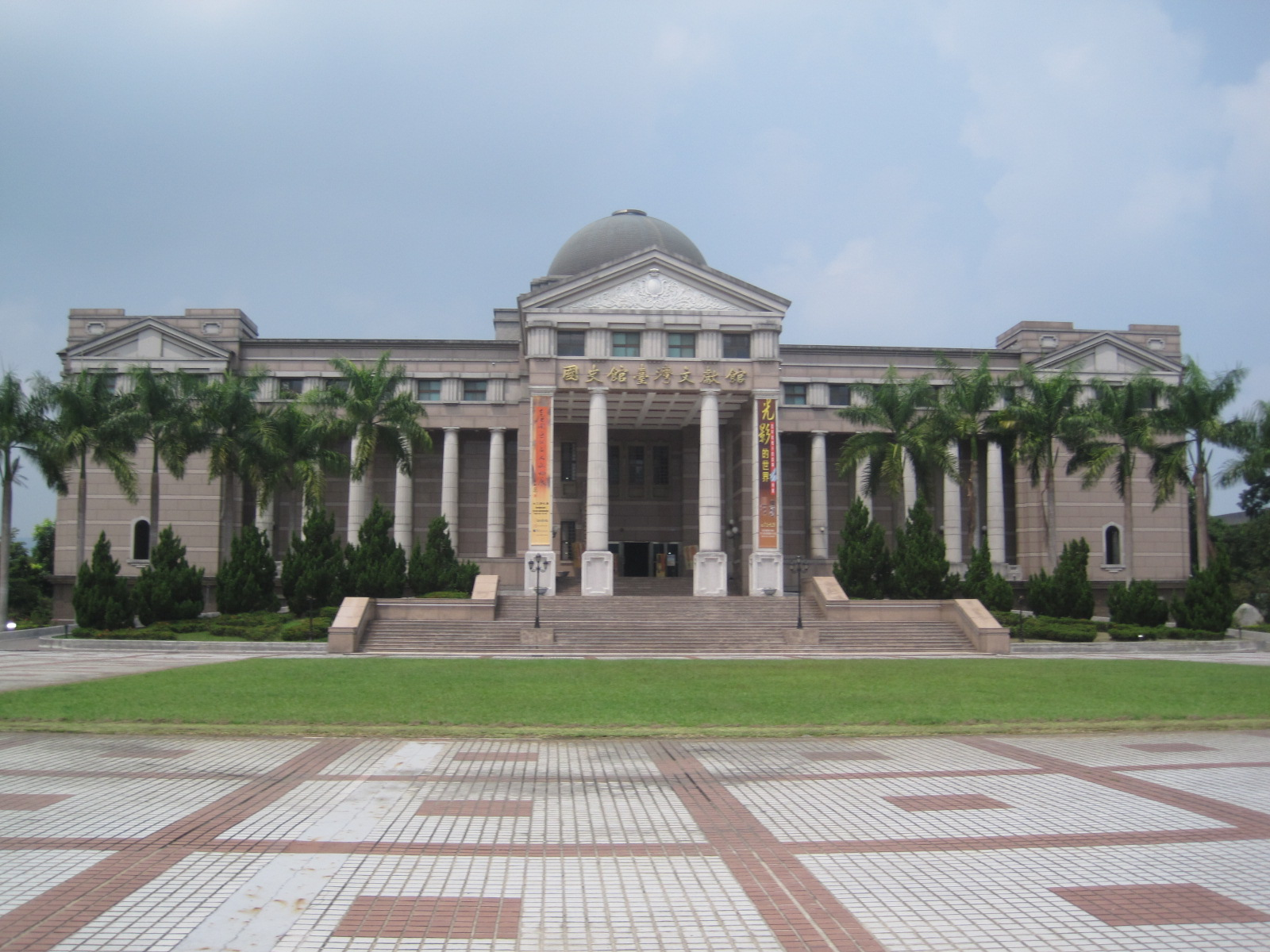
- Folklore Artifacts Hall
- Interactive map of the Taiwan Historica area

General information
- Location: Zhongxing New Village, Nantou City, Nantou County, Taiwan
- Opening: 1 June 1948 (as Taiwan Provincial Common History Historica); 1 January 2002 (as Taiwan Historica)
- Operator: Zhang Hong-ming (Director)

Website
- Official website

The Taiwan Historica (TH; traditional Chinese: 國史館臺灣文獻館; simplified Chinese: 国史馆台湾文献馆; pinyin: Guóshǐguǎn Táiwān Wénxiànguǎn; Pe̍h-ōe-jī: Kok-sú-koán Tâi-oân Bûn-hiàn-koán) is an institution located in Zhongxing New Village, Nantou City, Nantou County, Taiwan established to compile the common history of Taiwan Province.

== History ==
Taiwan Historica was originally established on 1 June 1948 as Taiwan Provincial Common History Historica. It was then changed to Historical Research Committee of Taiwan Province in July 1949. The committee was affiliated to the Civil Affairs Department in 1958, to the Cultural Affairs Department in July 1997, to Taiwan Provincial Government in July 1999 and to Academia Historica on 1 January 2002 and changed its name to Taiwan Historica on the same date.

== Facilities ==
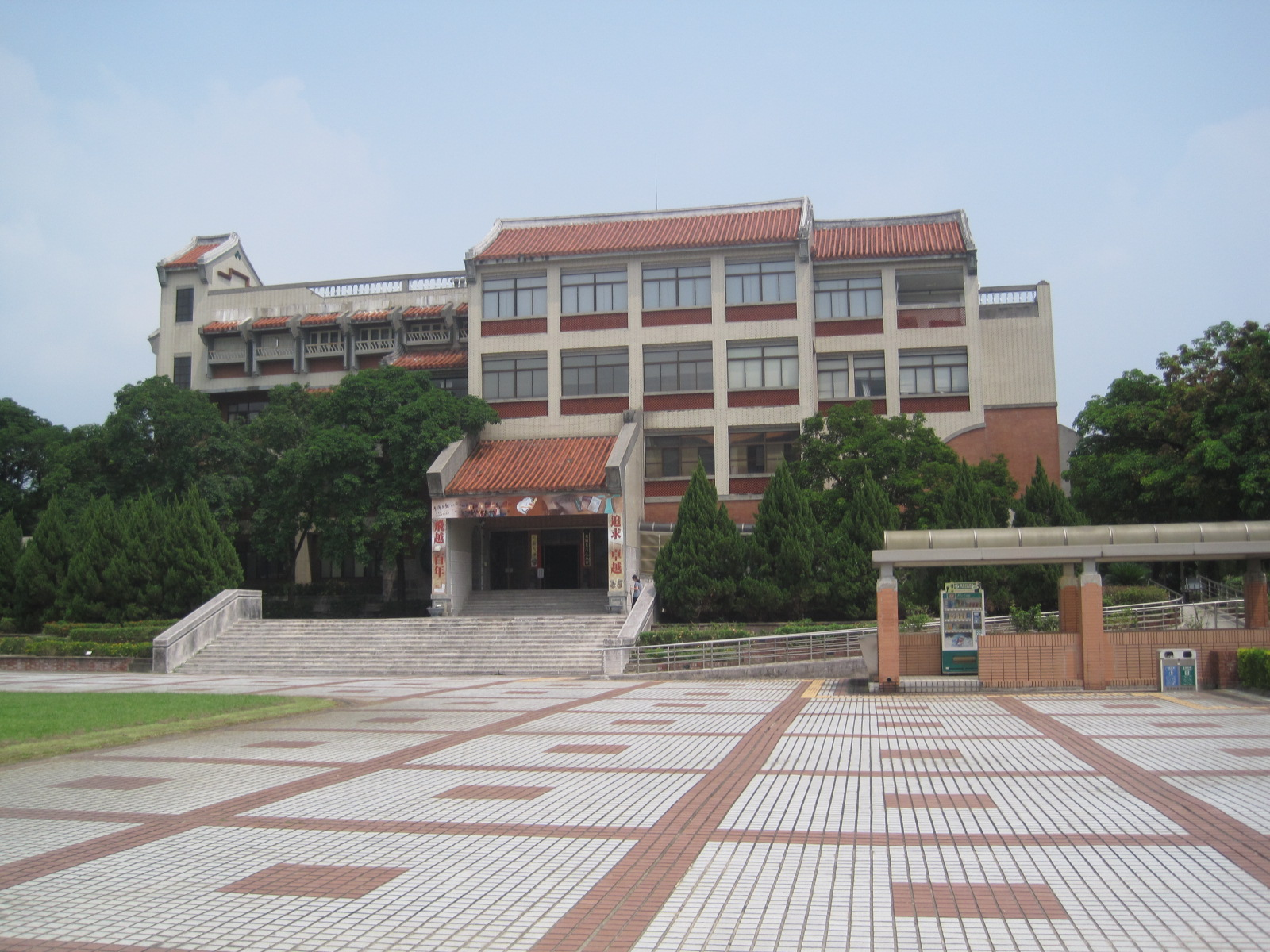
Records and Archives Hall

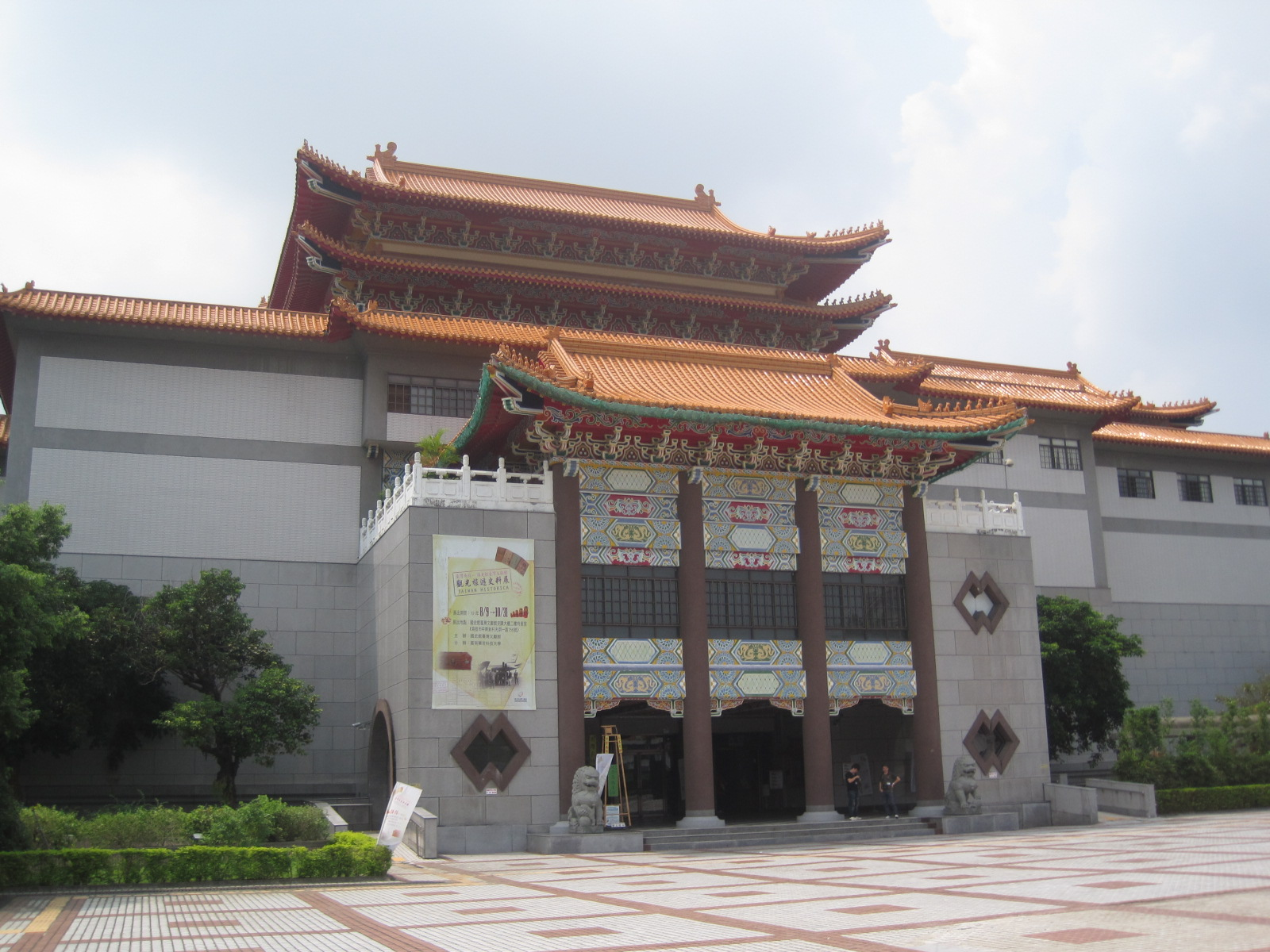
Historical Documents Exhibition Hall

- Folklore Artifacts Hall
- Records and Archives Hall
- Historical Documents Exhibition Hall

== See also ==
- Taiwan Province
- Academia Historica
