= Hokkaido Takushoku Bank =

Former Japanese bank

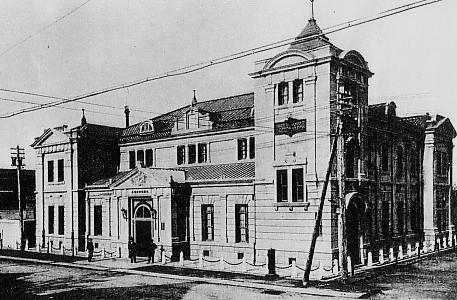
Head office in Sapporo, photographed in 1910

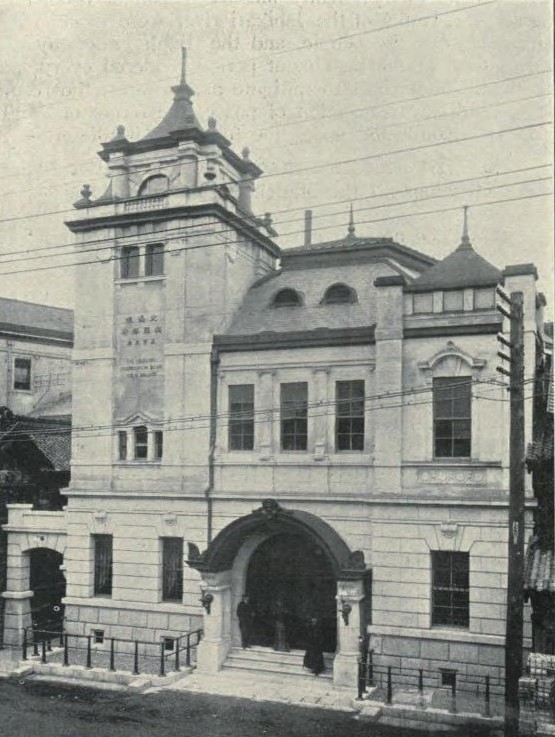
Tokyo branch, photographed in 1910

The Hokkaidō Takushoku Bank (北海道拓殖銀行, Hokkaidō Takushoku Ginkō), generally translated as Hokkaidō Development Bank (alternatively Hokkaidō Colonization Bank) and also referred to by the shorthands Takugin (拓銀 or たくぎん) or Hokutaku (北拓), was a significant Japanese bank, based in Sapporo, Hokkaidō. It was established in 1899-1900 as a policy institution or "special bank", similarly as Nippon Kangyo Bank (est. 1897), Bank of Taiwan (est. 1897) and Industrial Bank of Japan (est. 1902), with the aim to promote capitalism on the island of Hokkaidō and thus contribute to its defence against the appetites of the Russian Empire.

After World War II, Hokkaido Takushoku Bank lost its special bank status and became a commercial bank ("city bank") with main operations in Hokkaidō. In the mid-1980s, it expanded nationwide to become Japan's 10th-largest bank by total assets by 1997. It eventually went bankrupt in November of that year, in one of the most disorderly episodes of the Japanese financial crisis.

== Policy bank ==
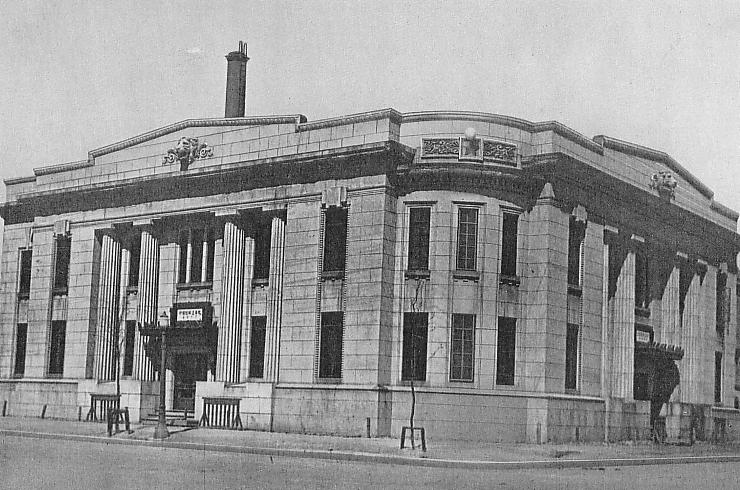
Branch in Toyohara, now Yuzhno-Sakhalinsk, photographed in the 1930s

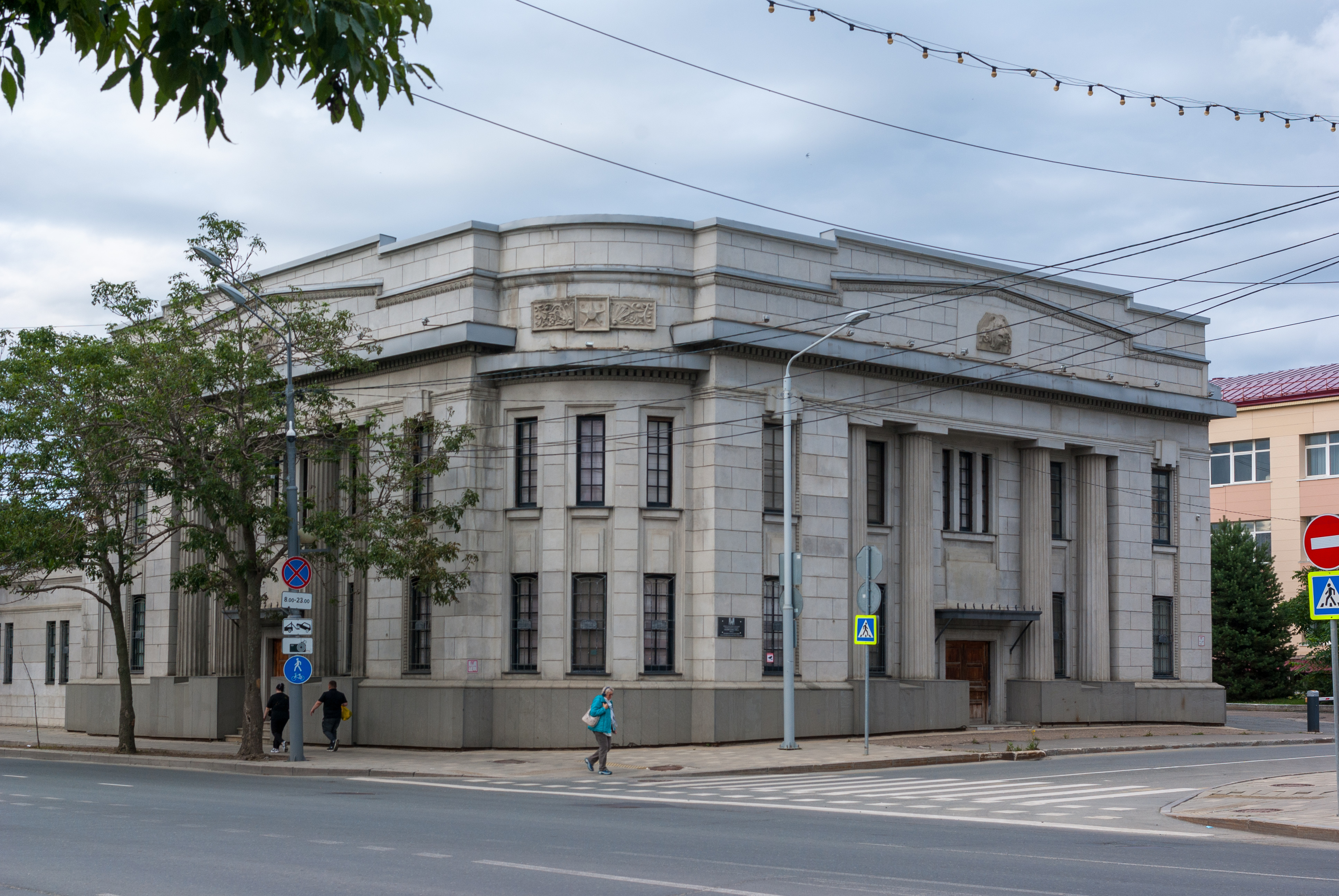
The same building in 2024, serving as Sakhalin Regional State Museum of Art

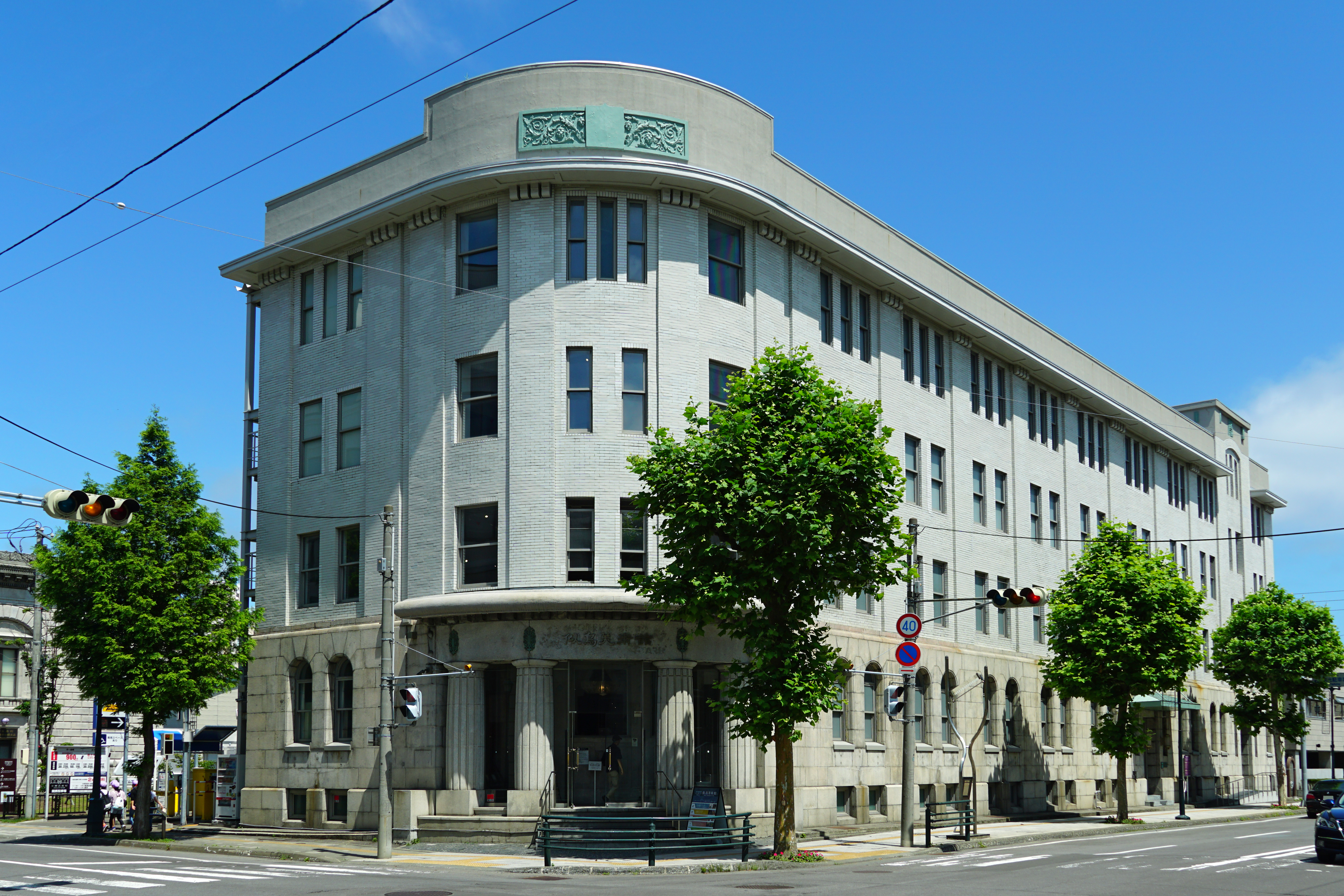
Former branch in Otaru, Hokkaido

On the announcement of the "agriculture and industry banking law" in 1896, "agriculture and industry banks" were set up in 46 prefectures throughout Japan. Hokkaidō was thought to be in the forefront as a prime candidate for economic exploitation, and instead of an agriculture and industry bank, a special "national policy bank" was deemed necessary. For this purpose, the Hokkaidō Takushoku Bank was established in 1899, and was incorporated as a "special bank" on February 2, 1900, providing long-term low-interest loans as capital for Hokkaidō's development. The target of these loans was not just the improvement of industry and agriculture; it also had as its object the key industries of fishing and those related to the further exploitation of Hokkaidō.

As a result, since Takugin acted as a replacement for certain similar types of bank, the "agriculture and industry" bank, the Nippon Kangyo Bank and the Industrial Bank of Japan, it was not until after World War II that Hokkaidō increased its representation in these sectors.

In 1939 there was an amendment to the Hokkaidō Takushoku Bank law, allowing the bank, which thus far had performed only long-term financing based on debt issuance, to handle bank accounts and offer short-term finance. Now performing simultaneously the roles of ordinary bank and savings bank, Takugin dramatically increased its scale of operations. Finally in the wartime unification, all banks relating to Hokkaidō and Karafuto, ordinary banks and savings banks, were merged.

== Commercial bank ==
In 1950 the Hokkaidō Takushoku Bank law was repealed, and Takugin was converted into an ordinary bank. In 1952, the provision of "exploitation bonds", which had existed since Takugin originally opened, was ceased (this service was transferred to The Long-Term Credit Bank of Japan). In 1960, Takugin achieved entry into the group of banks known as City Banks.

In March 1963, Takugin took over running of the Hokkaidō lottery.

In Hokkaidō the great majority of families had an account at "Mr. Takugin", and virtually all the municipalities were clients. While having the smallest scale of operations as a "city bank", Takugin established a status as the "Hokkaidō people's bank".

Beginning from around 1962, Takugin began using the character of Takuchan ("little Taku") the brown bear as a motif. Takuchan savings boxes made of vinyl chloride are still popular among figure collectors to this day. From 1989, Takugin used the character Sanrio.

== Expansion and collapse ==
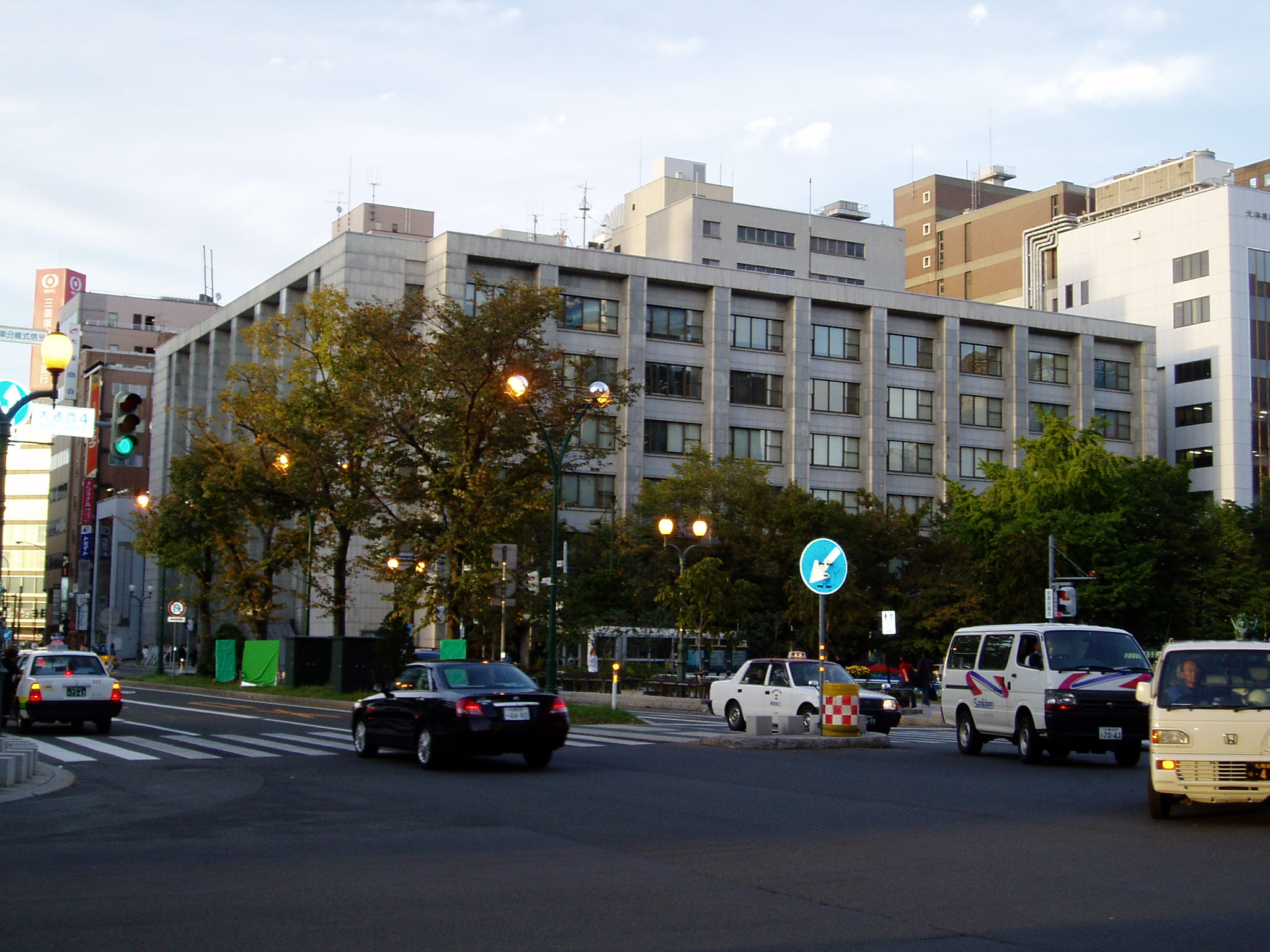
Postwar head office of Hokkaido Takushoku Bank in Sapporo, photographed in 2006

From about 1985, like many other banks, Takugin opened branches in Tokyo and Osaka, and became concerned with real estate. In ordinary banking activity, finance is not provided above the 70% of real estate value, but at the time of the bubble it was foreseen that land values would rise steeply, so real estate financing was offered at 120-130% of value. Many credit facilities at this time were taking a similar form of finance, but Takugin had been somewhat slow off the mark. It therefore had to set collateral at a lower precedence than the collateral which had been already given to other credit providers. This meant that the part of the loan repayable to Takugin would be less if the borrowing real estate company were to go bankrupt. Ultimately, this is exactly what was to happen.

As bubble economics collapsed in the 1990s, Takugin's level of bad debts began to soar. Bad debts exceeded ¥1 trillion, and the means of collecting them were lost. For example, they had financed the Sapporo real-estate company Kabuto Decom to more than ¥120 billion, helping it to grow rapidly, and when the bubble collapsed and the debt became bad, from 1993 onwards they changed their attitude to coercively recovering the money. The result of the dispute with Kabuto Decom's leadership was to get Kabuto Decom's president indicted and arrested by the public prosecutor's office. Meanwhile, in a September 1994 Ministry of Finance study, the conclusions reached with regard to financing of resort companies were that ¥10 billion in loans continued without regard to the disposal of bad debts.

=== Aborted merger with Hokkaidō Bank ===
In March 1997, with bad debts at 13.4% of Takugin's bank's total lending, thought to be the largest rate of all the City Banks, along with economic uncertainty, a problem with money supply emerged. With the policy aim "don't crush the big 20", the finance ministry formed a plan to merge Takugin with Hokkaidō Bank (Dohgin), which was the second bank in Hokkaidō, and whose president was the former head of treasury bills. Since Dohgin was also in financial difficulty due to the collapse of the bubble, at the end of March 1997 an amalgamation plan was revealed under which Takugin would continue in the interim, and in April of the following year there would be an amalgamation to form a bank called the New Bank of Hokkaidō.

However, owing to mistrust over differences in perception of the bad debts, and emotional arguments based on the long-time rivalry with Takugin, the employees of Dohgin were strongly opposed to the merger. In the end, with no thawing in the antagonism of the two banks, it was announced on 12 September 1997 that there would be a half-year postponement of the merger, which in practical terms was a freeze, and it was understood that the Dohgin side had revoked the merger entirely.

With deposits peaking in 1994 at ¥8.7 trillion, increasing financial instability was causing contracts to be broken, particularly in the Honshū region, and the outflow increased. By the end of September 1997, deposits had descended to ¥5.9 trillion. After the failure of the merger, Takugin's financial insecurity increased yet again, such that its share price actually fell 100 yen below the level assigned for a bankruptcy warning. The cash flow situation was now more difficult, but Takugin was managing to put together some capital based on fixed-term loans from big lenders at relatively high interest rates, and from the "call market".

=== Bankruptcy ===
On 4 November 1997 the bankruptcy of Sanyō Securities caused the Central Gunma Trust Fund (now Gunma Trust Fund) to default on about ¥1 billion yen of unsecured loans. As a result, the unsecured call market descended into chaos, with every funding facility ordering an emergency decrease in its credit line. The cash flow in the call market became difficult for Takugin. With its share price at 59 yen, Takugin was on the verge of breaking the 50 yen barrier.

Already without the possibility of getting capital from the call market, Takugin, having been deserted by the finance ministry announced that its efforts to find financing would end the following week. On 17 November, an emergency meeting of the board of directors was organized in the Palace Hotel, Tokyo, where the decision was finally taken to abandon hope of continuing business. That sign of decisiveness on the part of the Japanese authorities, made in coordination with U.S. counterparts, triggered a market rally.

== Aftermath ==
As a result of the collapse, Takugin's operations on Hokkaidō Island were absorbed by the North Pacific Bank, by then Hokkaido's third-largest bank after Takugin and Dohgin. All operations outside Hokkaido were then absorbed by what is now Chūō Mitsui Trust and Banking Co. After the inauguration of Chūō Mitsui Trust, almost all the old Takugin branches outside of Hokkaidō have disappeared, and only the branches associated with Takugin's old partners Shakujii (in Tokyo) and Sugido (in Saitama prefecture) remain.

Takugin's unified financial institution code was 0012.

== See also ==
- Bank of Chōsen
