= SBI Shinsei Bank =

Japanese financial institution

SBI Shinsei Bank, Limited

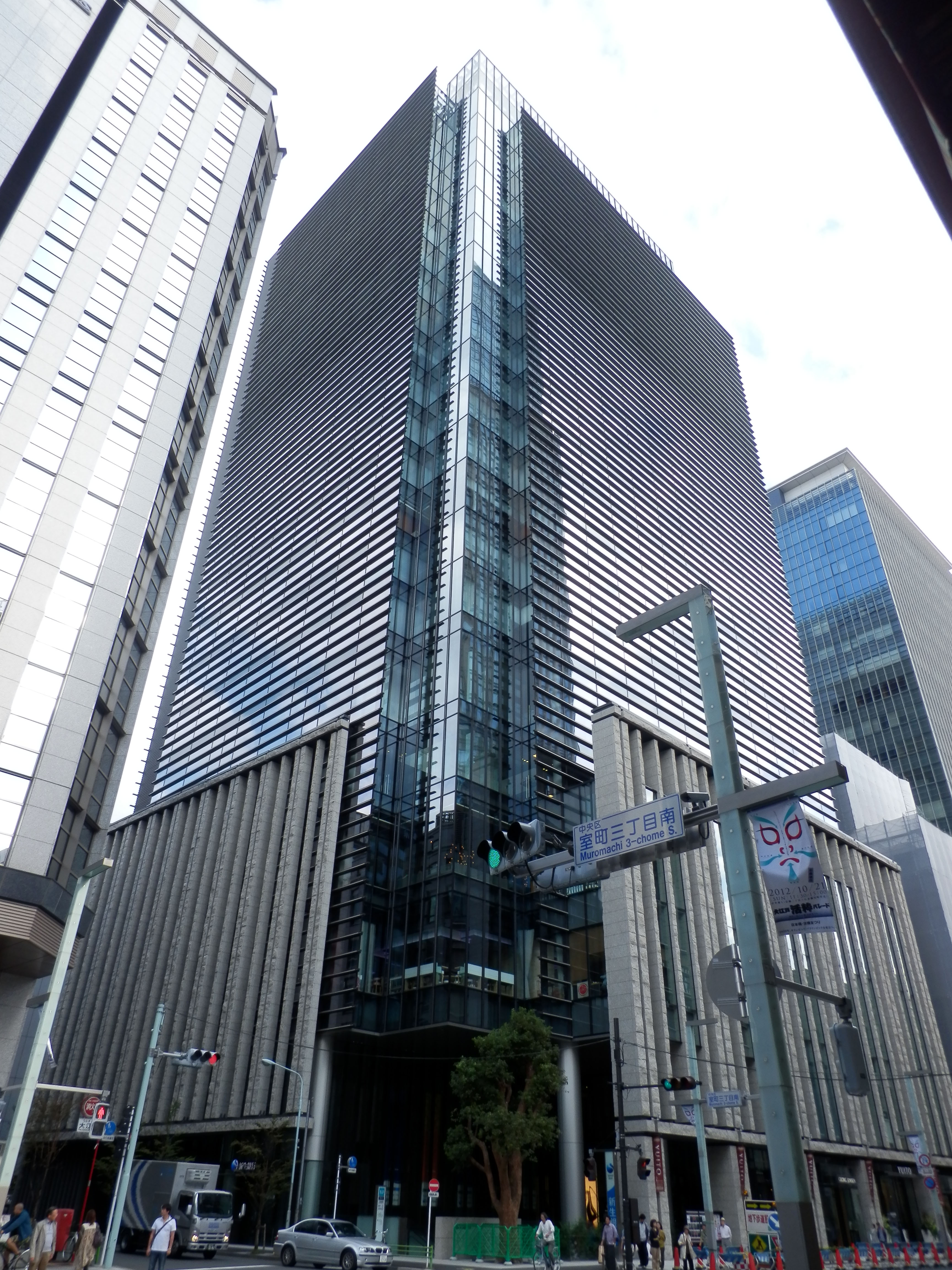
- Headquarters in Nihonbashi, Tokyo
- Native name: 株式会社SBI新生銀行
- Romanized name: Kabushiki-gaisha SBI Shinsei Ginkō
- Type: Public
- Traded as: TYO: 8303
- Industry: Banking
- Predecessor: Long-Term Credit Bank of Japan (1952-2000)
- Founded: 2000; 26 years ago
- Headquarters: Chuo, Tokyo, Japan
- Key people: Katsuya Kawashima (President and CEO)
- Total assets: ¥24,741.359 billion (consolidated; March 31, 2026)
- Owners: SBI Holdings (71.21%); The Master Trust Bank of Japan (2.63%); Qatar Holding LLC (1.91%)
- Number of employees: 5,828 (consolidated; March 31, 2026)
- Website: sbishinseibank.co.jp

SBI Shinsei Bank, Limited (株式会社SBI新生銀行) is a Japanese bank headquartered in Chuo, Tokyo. It is a subsidiary of SBI Holdings and is listed on the Prime Market of the Tokyo Stock Exchange.

The bank traces its origins to the Long-Term Credit Bank of Japan, which was nationalized in 1998 and subsequently renamed Shinsei Bank in 2000.

== History ==
SBI Shinsei Bank is the successor of the Long-Term Credit Bank of Japan (LTCB), which had a government monopoly on the issuance of many long-term debt securities. Following the collapse of the Japanese asset price bubble in 1989, the bank was riddled with bad debts: the government nationalized it in 1998, and it was delisted from the Tokyo Stock Exchange. After several proposed mergers with domestic banks, LTCB was sold to an international group led by US-based Ripplewood Holdings in March 2000 for ¥121 billion ($1.2 billion U.S.), the first time in history that a Japanese bank came under foreign control. Investor Christopher Flowers also played a major role in the buyout syndicate and remained a key shareholder of the company until August 2019, when the Japanese government acquired the shares held by his fund.

As part of the deal, the Japanese government insisted that LTCB maintain existing loan accounts for at least three years. The final purchase agreement included a "defect warranty provision" (瑕疵担保条項, kashi tanpo jōkō) to the effect that Shinsei could demand within the next three years that the government purchase any claims which had fallen by twenty percent or more from book value. A similar provision was afforded Aozora Bank, the successor of LTCB's similarly beleaguered sister company Nippon Credit Bank.

LTCB was relaunched as "Shinsei Bank" (literally "Newborn" or "New Life" Bank) in June 2000, with new management and services. Many of Shinsei's managers had previous experience working for foreign financial institutions in Japan, such as CEO Thierry Porte (formerly of Morgan Stanley) and CIO Jay Dvivedi (formerly of Citibank). Shinsei continued to use the Long-Term Credit Bank SWIFT code (LTCBJPJT).

SBI Shinsei used the defect warranty provision to dispose of all the worst debts owed to the bank. Several companies which had used LTCB as their primary bank went bankrupt as a result, including Sogo (July, 2000) and the Dai-Ichi Hotel. This created a furor in Japan: politicians especially criticized Goldman Sachs, which advised on the sale of LTCB, for not warning the government of the risks inherent in the defect security provision.

SBI Shinsei then raised ¥230 billion in an IPO on February 20, 2004. The purchase of Shinsei thus turned a profit of over ¥100 billion within four years. The success of the IPO intensified criticism of Shinsei, however: the government was estimated to have lost ¥4-5 trillion on the deal between lost investments and forced purchases of bad debt, and the profits from the deal even escaped Japanese taxation through the use of a foreign investment partnership. In April 2004, the bank exchanged its long-term credit banking license for a standard commercial banking license.

The Financial Services Agency issued an improvement order to Shinsei on June 29, 2007, after the revenues of the company fell dramatically below targets.

On April 25, 2009, it was announced that Shinsei Bank and Aozora Bank have entered into negotiations to integrate their operations in the summer of 2010, with an eye toward an eventual merger, however the talks collapsed in May 2010 amid disputes over capitalization and business strategy, as well as the abatement of the 2008 financial crisis.

In 2010, the bank sold its headquarters building near Hibiya Park and its operations center in Meguro in order to avoid falling below targets again due to investment writedowns during the subprime crisis in the United States. Shinsei moved its headquarters to the Nihombashi area of Chuo City in January 2011.

In December 2021, Shinsei Bank became a subsidiary of SBI Holdings.

On January 4, 2023, the bank changed its name to SBI Shinsei Bank. Its shares were delisted from the Tokyo Stock Exchange on September 28, 2023.

In July 2025, the bank completed the repayment of public funds received following the nationalization of its predecessor. On December 17, 2025, SBI Shinsei Bank was relisted on the Prime Market of the Tokyo Stock Exchange.

== Services ==
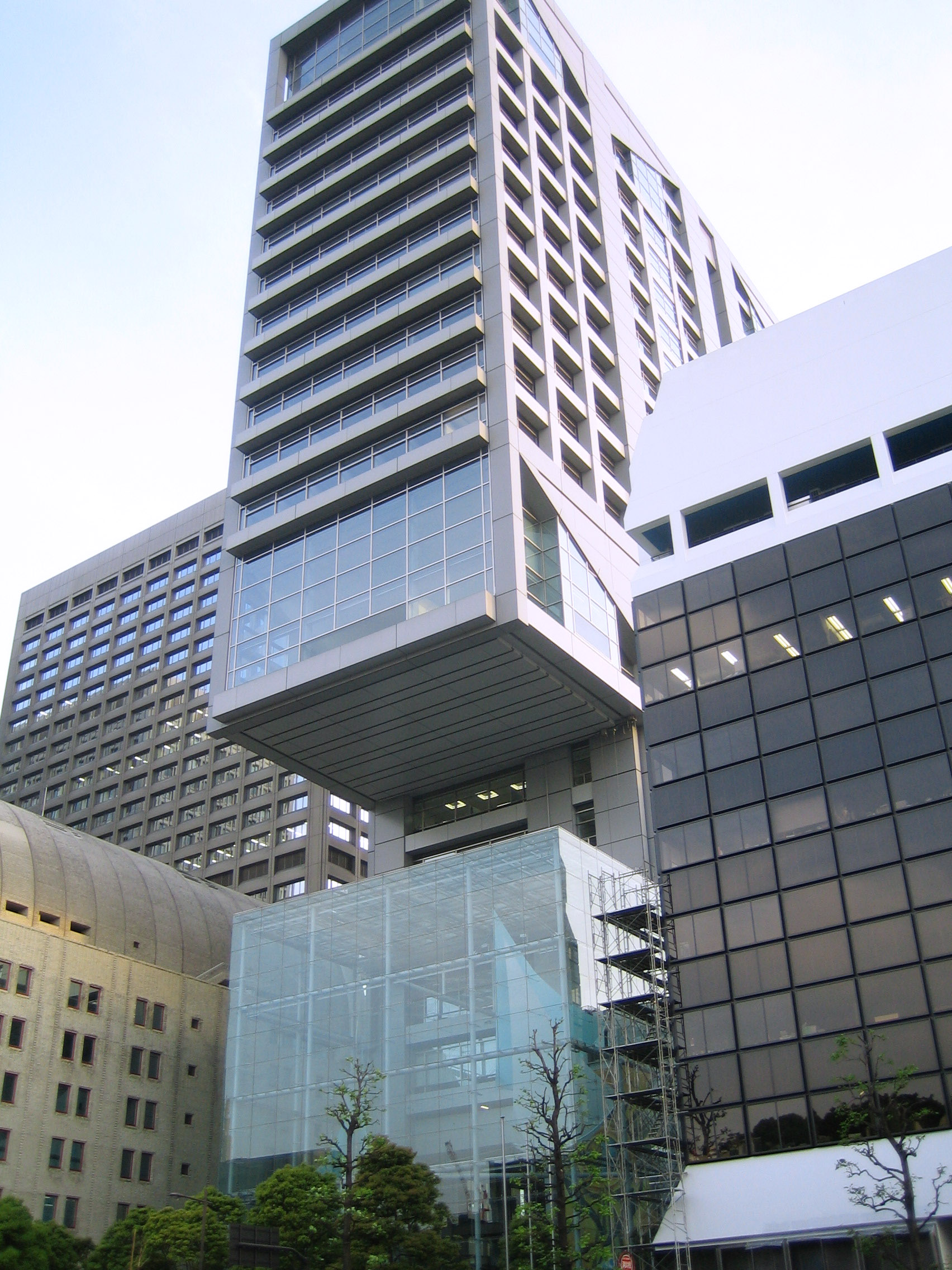
Former head office adjacent to Hibiya Park in Tokyo. The building was constructed in 1993 to house LTCB.

SBI Shinsei Bank provides retail banking, institutional banking, and consumer and commercial finance services.

=== Retail banking ===
Shinsei offers a number of unique services as part of its basic "PowerFlex" savings account, including:

- "Cash back" for any ATM fees incurred when making withdrawals overseas.
- Banking office hours until 7 PM in many locations (most Japanese banks close much earlier, often as early as 3 PM).
- Foreign currency deposits as part of the standard account package (unique to Shinsei and Tokyo Star Bank and Jibun Bank).
- Instant cash card issuance for customers opening new accounts in person with photo ID.

The Shinsei banking system is based on the FLEXCUBE software developed by Oracle Financial Services Software Ltd. Formerly i-flex solutions.

Shinsei also gears many of its services toward resident foreigners in Japan, with English-language online banking and telephone support, as well as no requirement for a personal seal in order to open an account.

=== Institutional banking ===
Shinsei combines its commercial and investment banking operations into an "Institutional Banking" division which engages in a broad range of commercial lending and equity investment. The IB division is affiliated with four subsidiary companies: Shinsei Investment Management, Shinsei Securities, Shinsei Servicer and Shinsei Trust and Banking. Shinsei also does considerable investment business in Europe through subsidiaries in London and Frankfurt.

=== Consumer and commercial finance ===
Shinsei operates many of its services in this field through its subsidiaries APLUS (consumer finance), Shinki (owner of the NoLoan consumer finance company), Showa Leasing (commercial and consumer leasing), Shinsei Business Finance (unsecured lending) and Shinsei Property Finance (mortgages).
