= Long-Term Credit Bank of Japan =

Former Japanese bank

The Long-Term Credit Bank of Japan, Limited
- Industry: Financial services
- Predecessor: long-term financial divisions of Nippon Kangyo Bank and Hokkaido Takushoku Bank
- Founded: 1952
- Defunct: 1998 (bankruptcy); 2000 (restructured)
- Fate: Bankruptcy; acquired by Ripplewood
- Successor: SBI Shinsei Bank
- Headquarters: Tokyo, Japan
- Key people: Binsuke Sugiura, President

The Long-Term Credit Bank of Japan, Limited (株式会社日本長期信用銀行, Kabushiki-kaisha Nippon Chōki Shin'yō Ginkō), abbreviated LTCB in English and Chōgin (長銀) in Japanese, was a Japanese bank founded in 1952 under the direction of the Shigeru Yoshida government to provide long-term financing to various industries in Japan. Along with the Industrial Bank of Japan and the Nippon Kangyo Bank, it was one of the major financiers of the postwar economic development of Japan.

Following extensive problems with bad debt in the 1990s, the bank was nationalized in 1998, and finally sold in 2000 to a group led by US-based Ripplewood Holdings in the first foreign acquisition of a Japanese bank. Also in 2000, it was rebranded as SBI Shinsei Bank.

== History ==
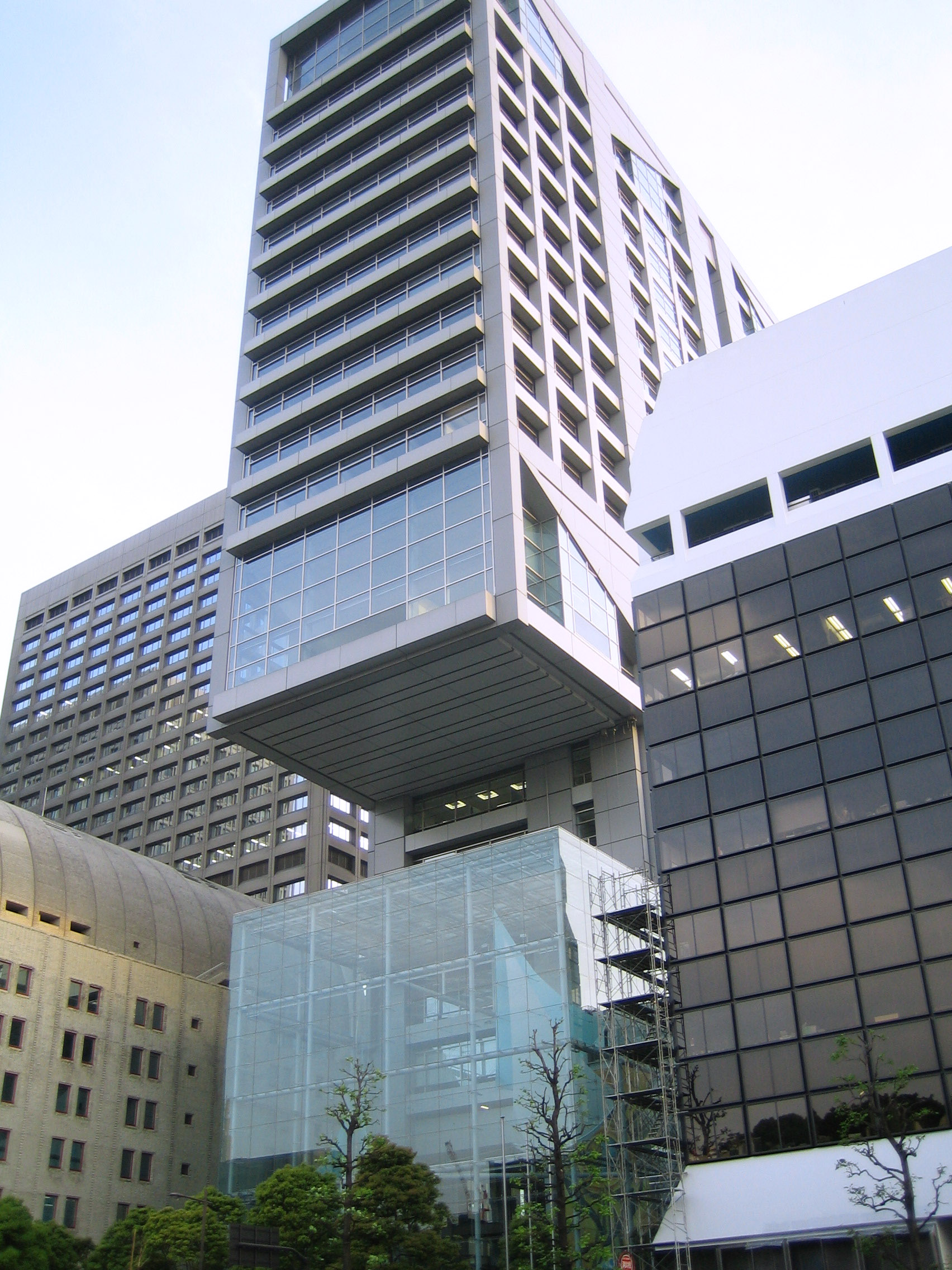
LTCB headquarters in Uchisaiwaicho, Tokyo, completed in 1993 and later occupied by SBI Shinsei Bank, LTCB's successor

The Diet of Japan enacted a Long-Term Credit Bank Act in June 1952 which became effective that December, and LTCB was incorporated as a stock company (kabushiki kaisha) with headquarters in the Kudan district of north-central Tokyo. It opened branches in Osaka and Sapporo in 1953, and established agencies at various regional banks. LTCB was almost immediately profitable, owing to the rapid expansion of the Japanese economy at the time. It declared its first dividend in 1954 and was listed on the Tokyo Stock Exchange in 1970.

Hayato Ikeda, then Minister of Finance, led the initiative to create LTCB as a specialty bank for the purpose of providing long-term credit to Japanese companies. Commercial banks at the time faced a mismatch between their own funding sources, which were mainly short-term demand deposits, and the needs of their customers for longer-term credit. LTCB was permitted to issue long-term bonds to fund its operations, which became popular investments in Japan due to their yield, credit rating and the fact that they were bearer bonds and therefore transferable like cash. The company moved to the Tokyo Building in Marunouchi in 1956 and established its first overseas office in New York City in 1964, followed by offices in London, Sydney, Amsterdam, Los Angeles, and other major financial centers.

=== Globalization ===
The 1970s were a time of major change for LTCB as Japanese government bond issuances increased, which drove up LTCB's cost of capital. Corporate funding needs decreased as expansion slowed, and more Japanese companies began to obtain funding from overseas sources.

A 1985 accord liberalized the Japanese financial services industry to a great degree and spurred the need for LTCB to dramatically change its business model. LTCB proceeded to train many employees in the United States and Europe in an effort to globalize its business. In 1988, LTCB acquired Greenwich Capital Markets, a Connecticut-based securities firm, thus giving LTCB a US-based securities business. By the early 1990s, it was the largest handler of yen-denominated foreign debt (samurai bonds).

As the Industrial Bank of Japan had a strong foothold on corporate banking, LTCB built up a large real estate finance business in the mid-1980s. The bank later became particularly infamous for its investments in overleveraged hotel acquisitions in New York, Saipan, Vietnam and Australia, among other locales, as the Japanese asset price bubble grew in the late 1980s.

As of 1990, LTCB was the ninth-largest bank in the world by market capitalization and had become one of the most prestigious banks in Japan. It moved to a new office building on the south side of Tokyo's Hibiya Park in 1993.

=== Collapse in 1990s ===
Like many other Japanese banks, LTCB faced a bad loan crisis in the post-bubble 1990s as many of its investments soured. The 1997 Asian financial crisis, which bankrupted several major Japanese financial services companies (most notably Hokkaido Takushoku Bank), exacerbated the situation. Around this time, LTCB entered into discussions with Swiss Bank Corporation (now part of UBS AG) aimed at a cross-shareholding joint venture between the two banks. As SBC performed due diligence it discovered that LTCB had a dramatically high proportion of non-performing loans which continued to increase. The JV talks were cancelled in September 1997. LTCB calculated its NPL balance at 2.4 trillion yen as of 1993, but increased that number to 5 trillion yen by 1998.

LTCB's stock price plunged by over 70% in the summer of 1998 as the details of its bad loan situation leaked to the public through a Japanese monthly magazine. Lawrence Summers, then U.S. deputy treasury secretary, visited Tokyo in June to pressure the Japanese government into resolving its bad loan crisis, fearing that an LTCB collapse would lead to a global financial panic. LTCB briefly sought to merge with Sumitomo Trust and Banking, one of the few stable Japanese banks at the time, but the latter discarded these plans after negative investor reaction. The Keizo Obuchi government, which had helped to broker the talks between the banks, then investigated the nationalization of LTCB, which became effective by an act of the Diet on October 23, 1998.

LTCB was purchased for ¥1 billion (US$9.5 million) in March 2000 by an investment partnership, New LTCB Partners CV, consisting of a consortium of foreign banks led by Ripplewood Holdings, which had bid against The Chuo Mitsui Trust and Banking Co. for the acquisition of LTCB. The company was renamed SBI Shinsei Bank in June 2000. Although LTCB was delisted from the TSE upon its purchase, Shinsei, which was relieved of the bad debts of its predecessor, had a successful initial public offering at 2004 and remains in operation today as a commercial bank.

=== Prosecution of executives ===
Prosecutors opened criminal investigations of several LTCB executives, owing to illegal payments of dividends in 1998 while the company was insolvent. Corporate planning head Takashi Uehara committed suicide in May 1999 shortly after his indictment was leaked to the public; Osaka branch manager Kazunori Fukuda followed suit days later.

LTCB president Katsunobu Onogi and two executive vice presidents were arrested in June 1999 on charges of reporting false profits and authorizing illegal dividends. On appeal, Onogi was sentenced to three years in prison and four years' probation while the other two executives were sentenced to two years in prison and three years' probation. The Supreme Court of Japan overturned their convictions in 2008, stating that the public accounting standards at the time were unclear and in a transitional period. The government was also unsuccessful in a suit to claim compensatory damages from the three executives.
