= Presidential and Vice-Presidential Artifacts Museum =

Museum in Zhongzheng, Taipei, Taiwan

Presidential and Vice-Presidential Artifacts Museum, Academia Historica
- 總統副總統文物館
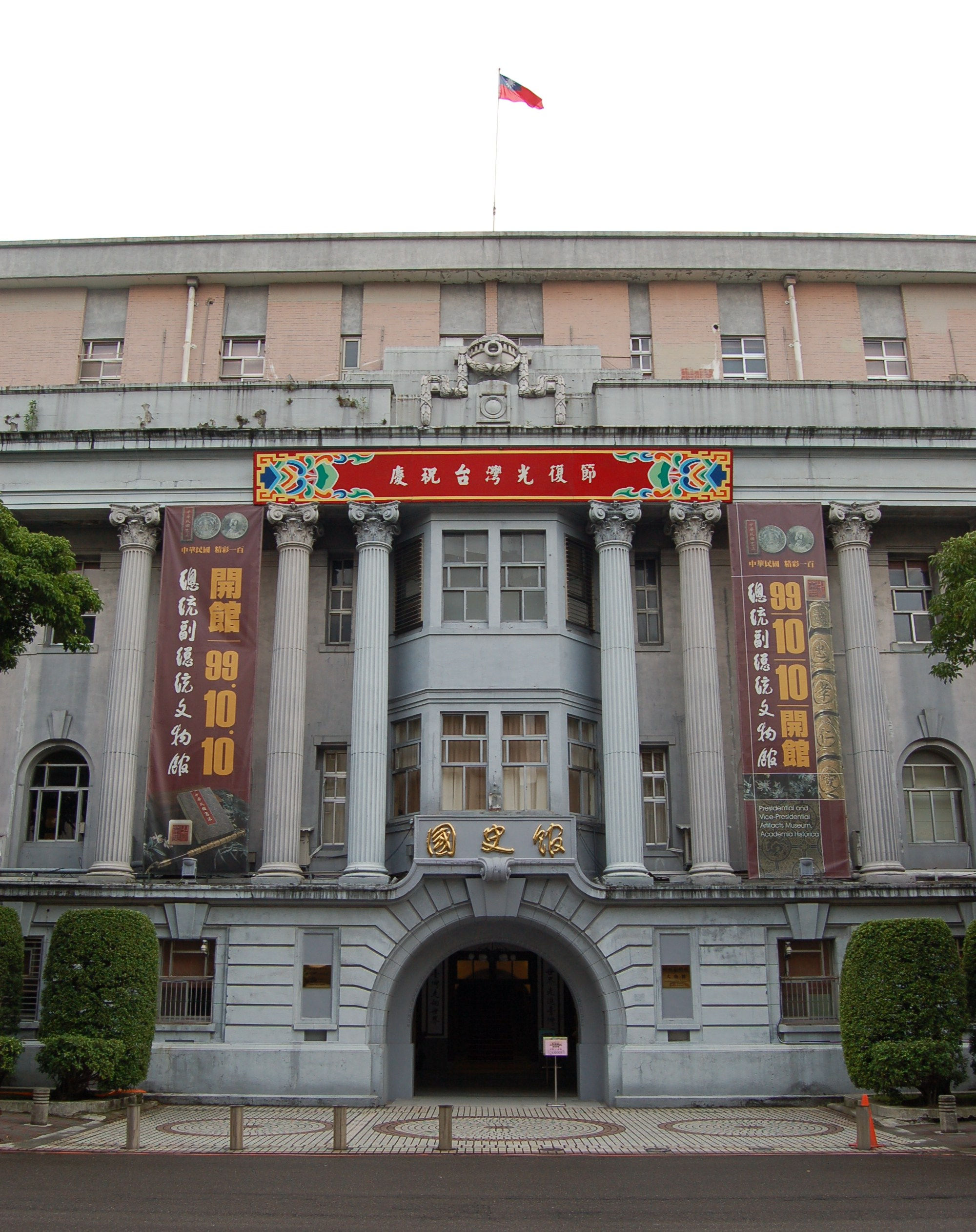
- Established: 10 October 2010
- Location: Zhongzheng, Taipei, Taiwan
- Coordinates: 25°2′23.89″N 121°30′38.64″E
- Type: Museum
- Website: www.drnh.gov.tw

The Presidential and Vice-Presidential Artifacts Museum (Chinese: 總統副總統文物館; pinyin: Zǒngtǒngfù Zǒngtǒng Wénwùguǎn) is a museum located in Academia Historica, Zhongzheng District, Taipei, Taiwan, Republic of China. The museum's collection includes collections and archives belonging to previous Presidents of the Republic of China.

The collection also includes furniture and artwork which belonged to previous Presidents as well a digital reading room which contains 1,100 publications and 687 books related to ROC presidents.

== Building ==
The Presidential Museum used to be the Communications Bureau affiliated to the Governor-General's Office during the Japanese occupation of Taiwan. Designed by Matsunosuke Moriyama, who also designed the Taiwan Governor-General's Office (now the Presidential Office).

The building also represents a turning point from the Classicism to Modernism in Taiwanese architectural history. The construction began in 1921 and completed in 1924, equipping this building with then state of the art facilities such as elevators, fire-proofing, and earthquake protections.

After taking over this building from the Ministry of Transportation and Communications in 2006, the Academica Historica renovated and transformed the site into the Presidential Museum.

== Transportation ==
The museum is accessible within walking distance South East from Ximen Station of the Taipei Metro.

== See also ==
- Presidential Office Building
- List of museums in Taiwan
