= Nippon Kangyo Bank =

Former Japanese bank

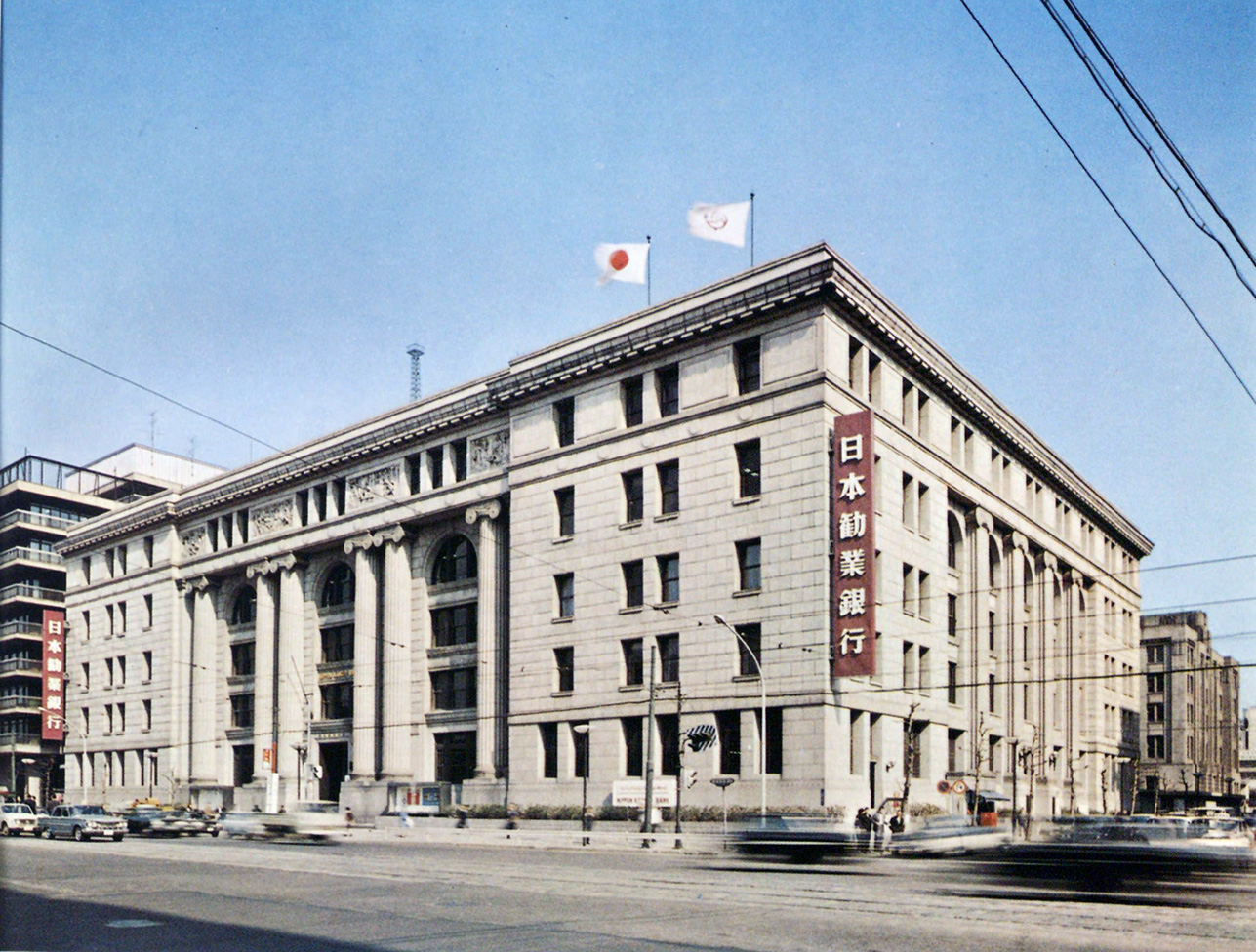
- Tokyo head office building as rebuilt in 1926, photographed in 1967
- Native name: 日本勧業銀行
- Company type: Public company
- Traded as: Previously TYO: 8311
- Industry: Financial services
- Founded: June 7, 1897
- Defunct: 1971
- Fate: Merged
- Successor: Dai-Ichi Kangyo Bank
- Headquarters: Tokyo, Japan
- Area served: Japan
- Products: Mortgages

The Nippon Kangyo Bank or Hypothec Bank of Japan (Japanese: 日本勧業銀行) (HBJ) was a major Japanese bank headquartered in Tokyo, established in 1897 as the first of a string of policy institutions ("special banks") that subsequently included Bank of Taiwan (est. 1899), Hokkaido Takushoku Bank (est. 1900), and Industrial Bank of Japan (est. 1902), with the aim to promote agriculture and industrial development by providing mortgage ("hypothecary") loans.

In 1971, Nippon Kangyo Bank merged with Dai-Ichi Bank to form the Dai-Ichi Kangyo Bank, subsequently Japan's largest bank and a predecessor to Mizuho Financial Group.

== History ==
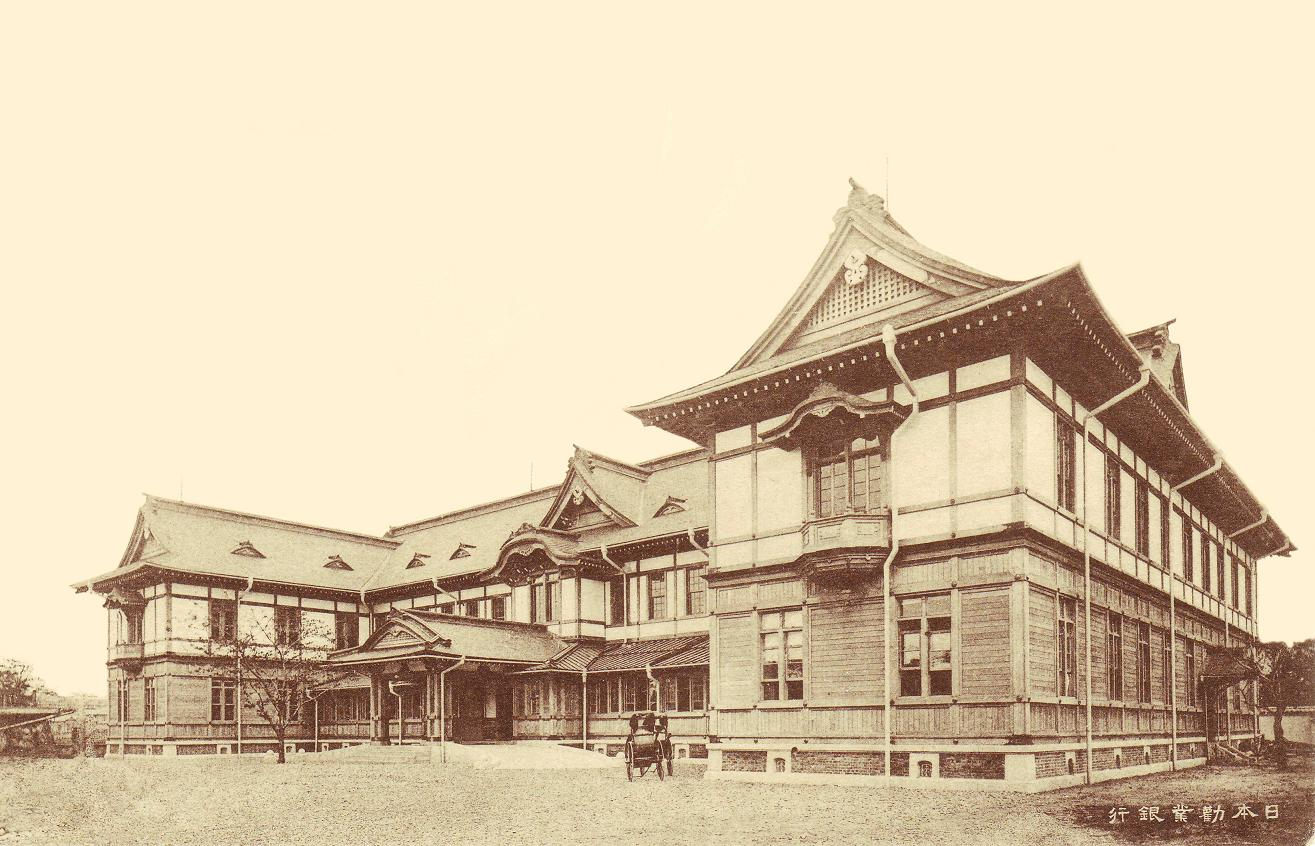
Original head office building of Nippon Kangyo Bank in Tokyo, photographed upon completion in 1899

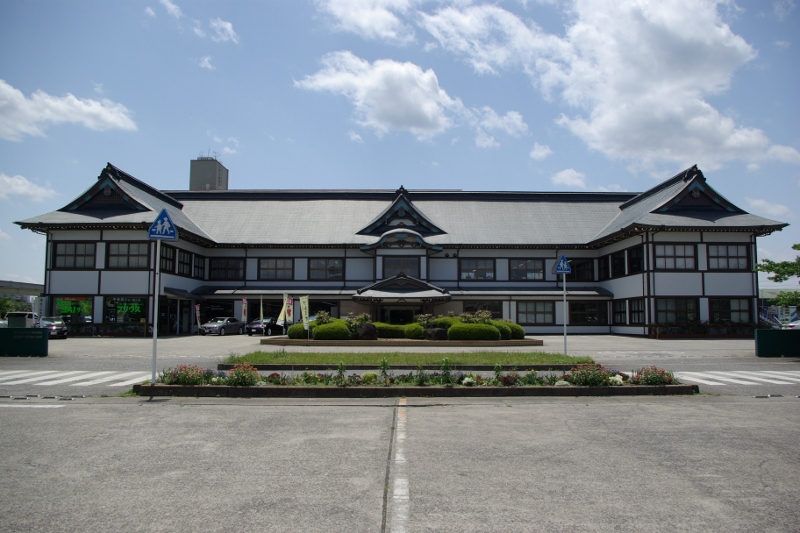
The original head office as reconstructed in 1965 in Chiba, lately head office of Chiba Toyopet Company

Former branch in Taipei, lately the Historical Museum of the Land Bank of Taiwan

Nippon Kangyo Bank was founded in 1897 as a governmental institution providing long-term light industrial and agricultural loans under the Nippon Kangyo Bank Act of 1896. The Industrial Bank of Japan was also founded in 1902, providing long-term heavy industrial loans. Nippon Kangyo Bank had offices only in Tokyo and Osaka, leaving nationwide local services in the charge of its subsidiaries known as Noko Bank (lit. Agricultural and Industrial Bank). A Noko Bank was established in each of the prefectures of Japan, except for Hokkaidō where a similar role was played by Hokkaido Takushoku Bank.

In order to provide long-term loans, the bank's source of funds was not deposits but securities. The bank was also authorized to issue premium-bearing debentures. The bank financed, however, landlords and partnerships, and there were little money to go around individual farmers. In 1911 the Nippon Kangyo Bank act was amended so that Nippon Kangyo Bank could handle deposit accounts and offer short-term finance. In the latter of Taishō period the bank embarked on real estate investments, while Noko Banks were absorbed into Nippon Kangyo Bank one after another. The bank dramatically increased its scale of operations.

During World War II, Nippon Kangyo Bank was the lead management underwriter of war bonds for Japanese government. In reality, the war bond by Nippon Kangyo Bank was a lottery rather than a bond. Today's Japanese lottery (takarakuji) has its origin in this war bond.

Following World War II the Nippon Kangyo Bank, like the Industrial Bank of Japan, lost its earlier status as semi-public bank by being privatized in 1950, following a recommendation from Supreme Commander of the Allied Powers General Douglas MacArthur. It thus became a commercial bank following the Nippon Kangyo Bank Repeal Act of 1950. The long-term banking division of Nippon Kangyo Bank was transferred to newly established Long-Term Credit Bank of Japan. The bank became popular among the public with the new rose logo, mascot named Nobara-chan (lit. Rose-chan) and advertising slogan "Rose's HBJ" (「ばらの勧銀」, Bara no Kangin).

== See also ==
- List of banks in Japan
