= Mitsubishi (disambiguation) =

Mitsubishi (三菱) is the common short name/spoken name for the Mitsubishi Group, which is a self-governing conglomerate of Japanese multinational companies in various industries, and originated from the Mitsubishi zaibatsu.

Mitsubishi may also refer to:

== Mitsubishi Group ==
- Mitsubishi Corporation, Japan's largest trading company
- Mitsubishi Heavy Industries, multinational engineering, electrical equipment and electronics company
  - Mitsubishi Logisnext, the division that manufactures battery-powered forklifts and other industrial equipment of Mitsubishi Heavy Industries
  - Mitsubishi Aircraft Corporation, the aviation manufacturing company and subsidiary of Mitsubishi Heavy Industries
- MUFG, the bank holding and financial services company
  - MUFG Bank, known as Mitsubishi UFJ Bank in Japan, one of the largest banks in Japan arm of the Mitsubishi UFJ Financial Group
    - Mitsubishi Bank, the bank established in 1919 is one of the predecessors of MUFG Bank
  - Mitsubishi UFJ Trust and Banking Corporation, trust bank arm of the Mitsubishi UFJ Financial Group
  - Mitsubishi UFJ Securities, the investment banking arm of the Mitsubishi UFJ Financial Group
  - Mitsubishi UFJ NICOS, the credit card company subsidiary of the Mitsubishi UFJ Financial Group
- Mitsubishi Logistics, logistics company
- Mitsubishi Motors, the automotive company and partially owned subsidiary of Nissan
- Mitsubishi Electric, the electronic equipment manufacturer spun off from Mitsubishi Heavy Industries
- Mitsubishi Chemical Group, the chemical holding company
  - Mitsubishi Chemical Corporation, the chemical manufacturer and arm of the Mitsubishi Chemical Group
  - Mitsubishi Rayon, the chemical manufacturer and arm of the Mitsubishi Chemical Group
  - Mitsubishi Plastics, the chemical manufacturer and arm of the Mitsubishi Chemical Group
  - Mitsubishi Tanabe Pharma, the pharmaceutical company and subsidiary of the Mitsubishi Chemical Group
- Mitsubishi Estate, one of the largest real-estate developers in Japan
- Mitsubishi Materials, Japan's largest non-ferrous metal manufacturer
- Mitsubishi Paper Mills, the paper company and subsidiary of the Oji Paper Company
- Mitsubishi Gas Chemical Company, the chemical manufacturer and subsidiary of the JSP
- Mitsubishi Research Institute, think tank established by Mitsubishi Group companies

== Other companies ==
- Mitsubishi Pencil, pen company that owns the Uni-ball brand
