= UFJ =

UFJ, which stands for the United Financial of Japan, is used in the former companies of UFJ Bank, UFJ Group, and UFJ Holdings.

UFJ was established by the merger in 2002 of the Sanwa Bank, Tokai Bank, and Toyo Trust and Banking.

UFJ disappeared after the merger of The Bank of Tokyo-Mitsubishi and UFJ in 2005.

== See also ==
- Mitsubishi UFJ Financial Group
- MUFG Bank
