= Master Trust Bank of Japan =

Japanese trust bank

The Master Trust Bank of Japan, Ltd.
- Native name: 日本マスタートラスト信託銀行株式会社
- Romanized name: Nippon Masutā Torasuto Shintaku Ginkō Kabushiki-gaisha
- Founded: 2000; 26 years ago
- Headquarters: Minato, Tokyo, Japan
- Key people: Kaoru Wachi (president)
- Net income: JPY 717 million (2016)
- AUM: JPY 371 trillion (2016)
- Total assets: JPY 6,217.9 billion (2016)
- Total equity: JPY 21.8 billion (2016)
- Owner: Mitsubishi UFJ Trust and Banking Corporation (46.5%); Nippon Life Insurance Company (33.5%); Meiji Yasuda Life Insurance Company (10.0%); Norinchukin Trust & Banking Co. (10.0%)
- Parent: Mitsubishi UFJ Financial Group
- Website: mastertrust.co.jp

The Master Trust Bank of Japan, Ltd. (日本マスタートラスト信託銀行株式会社, Nippon Masutā Torasuto Shintaku Ginkō Kabushiki-gaisha) is a trust bank in Japan. It was founded in 2000 and claims to be the first trust bank in Japan to be exclusively engaged in asset administration business.

The company's shareholders are Mitsubishi UFJ Trust and Banking Corporation (46.5%), Nippon Life Insurance (33.5%), Meiji Yasuda Life Insurance (10%) and Norinchukin Trust & Banking Co. (10%). Master Trust Bank is treated as a consolidated subsidiary of Mitsubishi UFJ Trust and Banking, and is by extension part of the Mitsubishi UFJ Financial Group.

It is one of the three main master trust service providers in Japan, alongside Trust & Custody Services Bank (affiliated with Mizuho) and Japan Trustee Services Bank (affiliated with SMFG).

== Shares ==
By the end of 2016, the Master Trust Bank of Japan had about 4.9 percent of the Japanese advertiser Dentsu, Inc. At the end of 2022, it held circa 15.4 percent shares of Toyo Tires, which according to revenue was the tenth biggest manufacturer of tires in the world. Furthermore, it respectively have two more powerful stakes of 17% in the Japanese investment company SoftBank Group and 10% in SoftBank Corp, a consolidated subsidiary of the SoftBank Group. In addition as of September 30 2025, the Master Trust Bank of Japan also has another powerful 15% stake in Japan's largest airline and flag carrier All Nippon Airways (ANA) where it also has the most shares in the airline.

== History ==
Master Trust Bank was founded in 2000 with investments from Mitsubishi Trust Bank, Nippon Life Insurance, Toyo Trust Bank, Meiji Life Insurance and Deutsche Bank. A month after its founding, it became the first Japanese asset administrator to offer online information reporting services.
