= First Sentier Group =

Australian asset management company

- Industry: Investment management
- Founded: 1988; 38 years ago
- Headquarters: Sydney, Australia
- Area served: Worldwide
- Key people: Harry Moore (CEO)
- Products: Asset management
- AUM: AUD$214.0 billion (30 September 2026)
- Number of employees: 1000+ (2026)
- Website: www.firstsentiergroup.com

First Sentier Group is a global asset management organisation that manages AU$214.0 billion (as at 30 September 2026) of assets across global and regional equities, cash and fixed income, listed and direct infrastructure, listed property securities, and alternative credit.

The Group is home to distinct affiliate investment teams including AlbaCore Capital Group, First Sentier Investors, FSSA Investment Managers, Igneo Infrastructure Partners, RQI Investors, and Stewart Investors. All investment teams operate with discrete investment autonomy, according to their investment philosophies and based on responsible investment principles.

It is owned by Mitsubishi UFJ Trust and Banking Corporation, (a wholly-owned subsidiary of Mitsubishi UFJ Financial Group, Inc) and operates as a standalone global investment management business with offices across Europe, the Americas, and Asia Pacific.

Formerly known as Colonial First State Global Asset Management in Australia, and First State Investments elsewhere, the firm was rebranded to First Sentier Investors in 2020 and subsequently First Sentier Group in 2025.

== History ==
=== 1988-1990s ===
State Bank of New South Wales established First State Fund Managers as a subsidiary in 1988. Colonial Mutual acquired State Bank of New South Wales, including First State Fund Managers, and became Colonial Group in 1994.

=== 2000-2010 ===
In 2000, Colonial Group was acquired by Commonwealth Bank of Australia (CBA). The Asset Management arm of the business was branded as Colonial First State Global Asset Management (CFSGAM), and First State Investments in 2005.

In 2007, the business became a signatory to the United Nations backed Principles for Responsible Investment (PRI).

In 2008, the business acquired 50% of Realindex Investments, an Australian based active quantitative global equities investor.

=== 2015-2020 ===
- 2015 - First State Stewart Asia and Stewart Investors were established
- 2017 - Realindex Investments was wholly acquired
- 2019 - First State Investments was acquired by Mitsubishi UFJ Trust and Banking Corporation, a wholly owned subsidiary of Mitsubishi UFJ Financial Group, Inc
- 2020 - First State Investments rebrands to First Sentier Investors

=== 2022-2025 ===
- 2022:
  - The unlisted Infrastructure team rebrands to Igneo Infrastructure Partners
  - First Sentier Group (then known as First Sentier Investors) achieves B Corp Certification
- 2023 – First Sentier Group (then First Sentier Investors) and AlbaCore Capital Group complete a strategic partnership
- 2024 – Realindex Investments rebrands to RQI Investors
- 2025 – First Sentier Group Limited established as group holding company, which includes First Sentier Investors (as an affiliate investment team.)

== Corporate structure ==
The company is headquartered in Barangaroo, Sydney, Australia on the land of the Gadigal people of the Eora Nation. It operates across Asia Pacific, Europe and North America.

In August 2019, Mitsubishi UFJ Trust and Banking Corporation acquired the business from the Commonwealth Bank. The Group operates as a standalone global investment management business governed by a Board of Directors.

First Sentier Group is the umbrella brand and home to its affiliate investment teams of AlbaCore Capital Group, First Sentier Investors, FSSA Investment Managers, Igneo Infrastructure Partners, RQI Investors and Stewart Investors.

== Responsible investment and corporate sustainability ==
First Sentier Group has been a signatory to the United Nations Principles for Responsible Investment (PRI) since 2007, and established Global Stewardship Principles in 2013. The organisation also produces annual Responsible Investment and Stewardship Reports.
