= Bank of Tokyo-Mitsubishi UFJ Money Museum =

Museum in Nagoya, Aichi, Japan

Coordinates: 35°10′58.05″N 136°55′42.58″E

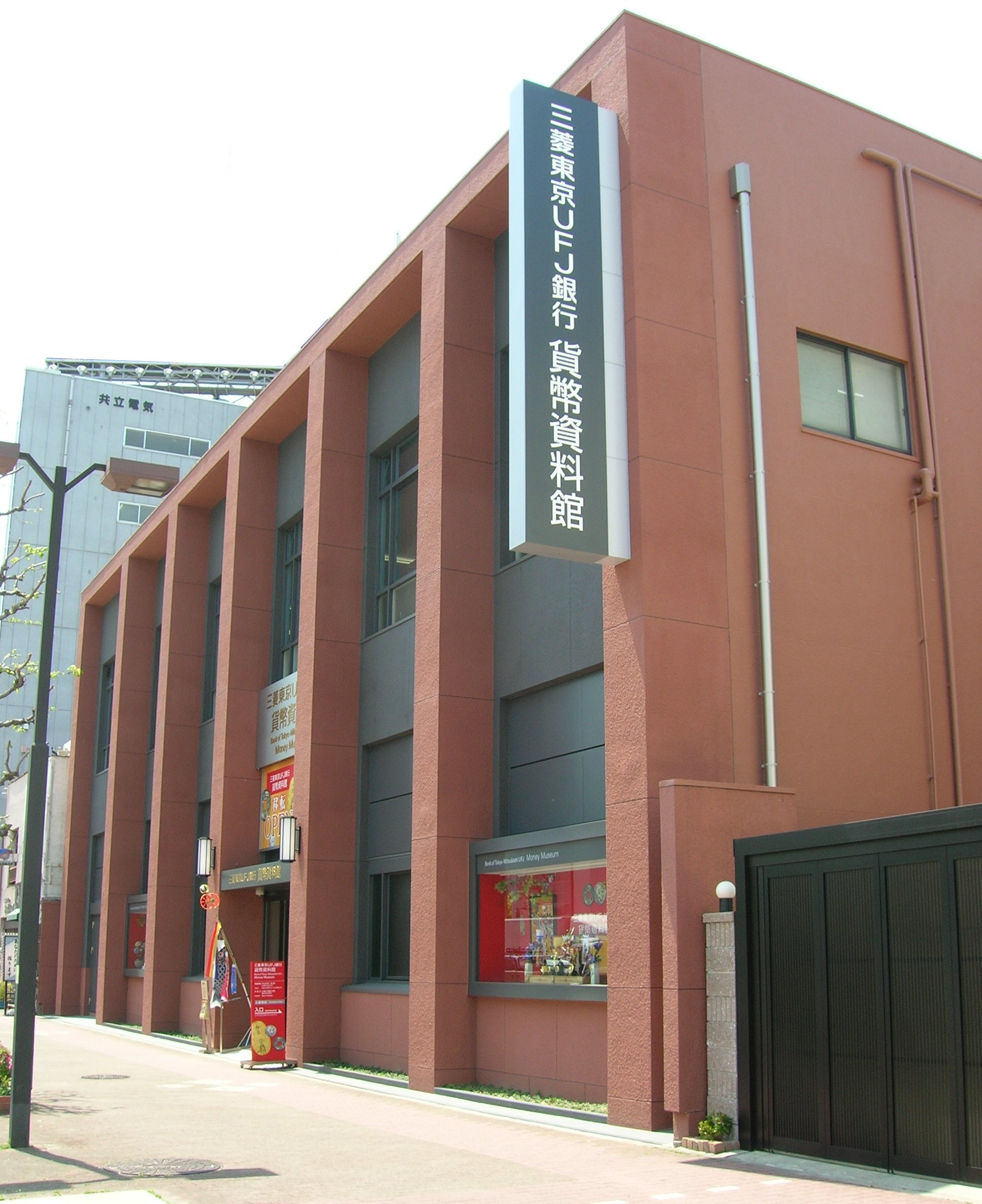
Bank of Tokyo-Mitsubishi UFJ Money Museum

The Bank of Tokyo-Mitsubishi UFJ Money Museum (三菱東京UFJ銀行貨幣資料館) is a numismatic museum located in Nagoya, central Japan.

As "Tokai Bank Money Museum", it opened in 1961. After a name change due to bank mergers, the present name was adopted in 2006. In 2009, it relocated to its present location near the Akatsuka-shirakabe (赤塚白壁) bus stop on Dekimachi-dori. It contains 10,000 exhibits of world currency. Utagawa Hiroshige's Ukiyo-e, "Fifty-three Stages of the Tokaido", is also housed there.

With the aim of contributing to society by preserving cultural properties and educating the public about them, this museum owns around 15,000 rare coins and bank notes and 1,800 ukiyo-e woodblock prints which are put on public display. The money exhibition room displays rare coins and notes from Japan and various countries around the world, including the world's oldest currency in the form of Shang dynasty cowrie shells. The Japanese currency features a gold coin called "Tensho Oban" whose production was ordered by Hideyoshi Toyotomi as well as Edo period currency and printing blocks, few of which are extant today.

MUFG and MUFG Bank operate the Money and Ukiyo-e Museum (Formerly MUFG Bank Money Museum), located on the first floor of their Nagoya Building. The museum has some special collections, including rare coins from Japan and around the world, as well as important ukiyo-e prints by Hiroshige Utagawa.

== See also ==
- List of museums in Japan
