= Jun'ichi Hanzawa =

- 半沢 淳一
- Born: January 19, 1965 (age 61); Saitama, Japan
- Education: Faculty of Economics, University of Tokyo
- Occupation: Businessperson

Jun'ichi Hanzawa (Japanese: 半沢 淳一, Hepburn: Hanzawa Jun'ichi, born January 19, 1965) is a Japanese businessperson.

== Career ==
Jun'ichi Hanzawa was born in Saitama. He attended the Saitama Prefectural Urawa High School. In 1988, he graduated from the Faculty of Economics, University of Tokyo, and joined the Mitsubishi Bank (now MUFG Bank) in the same year.

He was on a promotional track from the moment he entered the bank, and his first assigned post was the Oji branch in Kita, Tokyo. In his fourth year, he is sent on loan to the International Finance Bureau (now International Bureau, Ministry of Finance) of the MOF (now Ministry of Finance), comes into contact with bureaucrats and statesmen, and takes part in official development assistance (ODA).
