= Hironori Kamezawa =

Japanese business executive (born 1961)

- 亀澤宏規
- Born: November 18, 1961 (age 64); Miyazaki, Japan
- Education: University of Tokyo
- Employer: Mitsubishi UFJ Financial Group

Hironori Kamezawa (亀澤 宏規, Kamezawa Hironori; born 18 November 1961) is a Japanese business executive. He serves as the President and Group CEO of Mitsubishi UFJ Financial Group (MUFG), the ninth-largest bank in the world by total assets. He holds a Master of Science degree in mathematics from the University of Tokyo.

== Early life and education ==
Kamezawa was born in Miyazaki Prefecture. He attended Miyazaki Nishi High School and later graduated from the Department of Mathematics, Faculty of Science at the University of Tokyo. Following his undergraduate studies, he completed his postgraduate studies at the Graduate School of Science at the University of Tokyo. His specialist field was number theory.

== Career ==
In 1986, Kamezawa joined Mitsubishi Bank, which is now known as MUFG Bank. In 2010, he was appointed Executive Officer of Mitsubishi UFJ Financial Group. In 2020, he became the President and Group CEO of Mitsubishi UFJ Financial Group.
