= JACCS =

Credit company in Japan

JACCS Co., Ltd.
- Native name: 株式会社ジャックス
- Type: Private (Subsidiary)
- Industry: Financial services
- Founded: December 23, 1948; 77 years ago
- Headquarters: Ebisu, Shibuya, Tokyo, Japan
- Services: Credit cards
- Owner: Mitsubishi UFJ Financial Group
- Parent: MUFG Bank 20.27%
- Website: Official website

JACCS Co., Ltd. (株式会社ジャックス, Jakkusu Kabushiki-gaisha) is a Japanese financial services company that specializes in credit sales. It is headquartered in Ebisu Neonart, 4-1-18 Ebisu, Shibuya, Tokyo, and the registered headquarters is Meiji Yasuda Life Insurance Hakodate Building, 2-5 Wakamatsucho, Hakodate, Hokkaido. JACCS is an abbreviation for Japan Consumer Credit Service. It is part of Mitsubishi UFJ Financial Group via MUFG Bank.

== History ==
JACCS was founded on December 23, 1948 and incorporated on June 29, 1954, in Hakodate, Hokkaido. The company expanded to Tokyo in 1974 and was listed on the First Section of the Tokyo Stock Exchange in 1978. In the fiscal year ended March 31, 2019, the company had an annual transaction volume of over 4 trillion yen in the credit card finance payment and retail finance fields. Since 2010, the company has expanded into ASEAN countries, providing sales financing for motorcycles and automobiles in four countries: Vietnam, Indonesia, the Philippines, and Cambodia. In the field of shopping credit and auto loans, including overseas business, JACCS boast one of the highest transaction volumes in the industry.

== Business overview ==
Three brands of credit cards are issued: Visa, MasterCard, and JCB. Among these, Visa was initially issued under the license of Visa Japan Association (currently VJA), but upon joining the MUFG group, an agreement was made with Mitsubishi UFJ Nikos on December 6, 2007. JACCS concluded a business partnership agreement to open up the Visa brand and began issuing VISA cards under the company's license in 2009. In 2013, it became a principal member and began self-publishing.

== Shareholders ==
- MUFG Bank (20.27%)
