= Sōkaiya =

Japanese corporate racketeers

Sōkaiya (総会屋) (sometimes also translated as "corporate bouncers", "meeting-men", or "corporate blackmailers") are specialized racketeers unique to Japan, and often associated with the yakuza, who extort money from or blackmail companies by threatening to publicly humiliate companies and their management, usually in their annual meeting (総会, sōkai).

If a company does pay sōkaiya, the sōkaiya will work to prevent others from embarrassing the company, either through intimidation or by disrupting the meeting so they cannot be heard.

The number of sōkaiya has decreased over the years, and in 2023 there were only about 150 sōkaiya, of whom 30 worked in groups and 120 worked alone.

== History ==
Sōkaiya originated in the late 19th century. At this time, the unlimited liability of the management put the managers' personal fortune at risk in case of rumors and scandals. Hence the management hired protection, called sōkaiya, to reduce the risk of such rumors. Even after the Japanese laws included a limited liability, hence reducing the personal risk to the managers, these sōkaiya continued to prosper, and were often used to quiet down otherwise difficult meetings. In that respect, they have even been compared to corporate lawyers in America.

In 1984, the law made first steps to reduce the threat from sōkaiya by establishing a minimum number of holdings (¥50,000) in order to be allowed into the shareholder meeting, leading to a slow decline of the number of sōkaiya. In response to this, the sōkaiya formed fake uyoku dantai, announcing embarrassing company secrets, fictional or not, from loudspeakers mounted on trucks in order to extort money from companies.

In 1994, Juntarō Suzuki, vice president of Fujifilm, was murdered by sōkaiya after he stopped paying these bribes.

== Activities ==
=== Disrupting shareholder meetings ===
Individual sōkaiya acquire enough stock from multiple companies in order to gain entrance to a shareholders' meeting. There, they disrupt the meeting (and embarrass the company) until their demands are met. For this, the sōkaiya often research the company in detail beforehand to uncover incidents of misconduct or other company secrets, and then blackmail the management so that these issues are not raised in the shareholder meeting or elsewhere. Often, they also invent fictional issues that the company would have difficulty disproving.

Modern sōkaiya have developed other, similar methods to accomplish their goals. One less subtle example is the banzai sōkaiya, who disrupt business places with their cries of "Banzai!" and praise of the Emperor until they are quietly paid to leave.

=== Other disruption ===
Sōkaiya also form fake groups, announcing embarrassing company secrets, fictional or not, from loudspeakers mounted on trucks in order to extort money from companies. They may also print special newspapers with topics embarrassing to companies, and then ask the company to buy the entire print at inflated prices, or even to subscribe to these newspapers, generating a steady flow of cash.

=== Preventing disruption of shareholder meetings ===
Sōkaiya have also been used by companies to drown out questions from legitimate shareholders which company officials do not want presented. One infamous case is related to Minamata disease (mercury poisoning), where the Chisso chemicals company managed to close a number of annual meetings within minutes, despite the presence of hundreds of protesters at the meetings. They have also been active against anti-war protesters and other people who may be viewed as a nuisance by the company at a particular time.

== Countermeasures ==
Article 968 of the Japanese corporations code prohibits sōkaiya activity, imposing imprisonment of no more than five years or a fine of no more than ¥5 million for "receiving, demanding or promising a proprietary benefit with regard to" statements or the exercise of voting rights at a shareholder or creditor meeting.

A practical countermeasure used by large corporations is to hold all shareholder meetings on the same day, so sōkaiya cannot disrupt all of them.

== Background ==
While in the West a shareholders' meeting is usually an earnest discussion between the shareholders and the management, in Japan it is often more of a ceremony, and the management does not feel the need to truly inform shareholders. In this atmosphere, the sōkaiya are able to prosper. However, with the trend for more deregulation in the Japanese market the business environment for sōkaiya is getting more and more difficult.

== Companies that have bribed sōkaiya ==
Major Japanese companies that have been found guilty of employing sōkaiya include but are not limited to:

- Mitsubishi, resulting in a number of arrests
- Daiwa Securities Group
- Nikko Securities
- Nomura Securities Co., with three top executive pleading guilty for multimillion-dollar payments. In this case, the sōkaiya actually owned enough stock to propose one of their choosing as a member for the board of directors.
- Nippon Shinpan, forcing the president Yoji Yamada into retirement after various executives paid up to ¥80 million to the subsequently arrested Kikuo Kondo of the Sumiyoshi-kai.
- Tokyo Electric Power Company
- Meiji Seika
