= Pacific Capital Bancorp =

Defunct American bank

- Industry: Banking
- Founded: March 17, 1960; 66 years ago
- Defunct: December 1, 2012; 13 years ago
- Fate: Acquired by MUFG Union Bank
- Headquarters: Santa Barbara, California
- Key people: Gerald J. Ford, Chairman; Carl B. Webb, CEO & President; Mark K. Olson, CFO
- Total assets: ▼$5.850 billion (2011)
- Total equity: ▲$0.761 billion (2011)
- Number of employees: 1,029 (2011)

Pacific Capital Bancorp was a bank headquartered in Santa Barbara, California. It had 47 branches, all of which were in Southern California. It operated under the name Santa Barbara Bank & Trust. The company also operated Morton Capital Management and R.E. Wacker Associates, investment advisory firms. In 2012, the company was acquired by MUFG Union Bank.

== History ==
The bank was founded as Santa Barbara National Bank on March 17, 1960.

In 1998, Santa Barbara Bancorp acquired Pacific Capital Bancorp for $287.6 million in stock and changed its name to Pacific Capital Bancorp.

In November 2008, the company received an investment of $180,634,000 from the United States Department of the Treasury as part of the Troubled Asset Relief Program (TARP).

In January 2010, the company sold its Refund Anticipation Loan and Refund Transfer business to Santa Barbara Tax Products Group for $10 million.

In April 2010, Gerald J. Ford bought a 91% stake in the company for $500 million.

On December 1, 2012, the bank was acquired by MUFG Union Bank for $1.5 billion.

As of June 2019 the bank still owes taxpayers and the US Government $26,561,211 from the TARP bailout.
