= Robert A. Kindler =

American businessman

Robert A. Kindler is the Global Chair of Mergers and Acquisitions of Paul Weiss. He previously was Global Head of Mergers & Acquisitions at Morgan Stanley, including as a member of the Management Committee. He graduated magna cum laude from Colgate University (majoring in romantic poetry and music) in 1976 and then New York University School of Law in 1980.

He has endowed professorships at both Colgate University and New York University School of Law. He was a Trustee of Colgate University for 13 years and is on the Board of the New York University School of Law.

== Career ==
Kindler began his career in 1980 as an associate at Cravath Swaine & Moore and became a partner in 1987. He joined JPMorgan in 2000 and was global head of mergers and acquisition. He joined Morgan Stanley in 2006.

During the 2008 financial crisis, MUFG Bank, Japan's largest bank, invested $9 billion in a direct purchase of a 21% ownership stake in Morgan Stanley on September 29, 2008. The payment from MUFG was supposed to be wired electronically; however, because it needed to be made on an emergency basis on Columbus Day when banks were closed in the US, MUFG cut a US$9 billion physical check, the largest amount written via physical check at the time. The physical check was accepted by Kindler, on behalf of Morgan Stanley.

== Personal ==
Kindler's brother is comedian Andy Kindler.
