= Tokai Bank =

Former Japanese bank

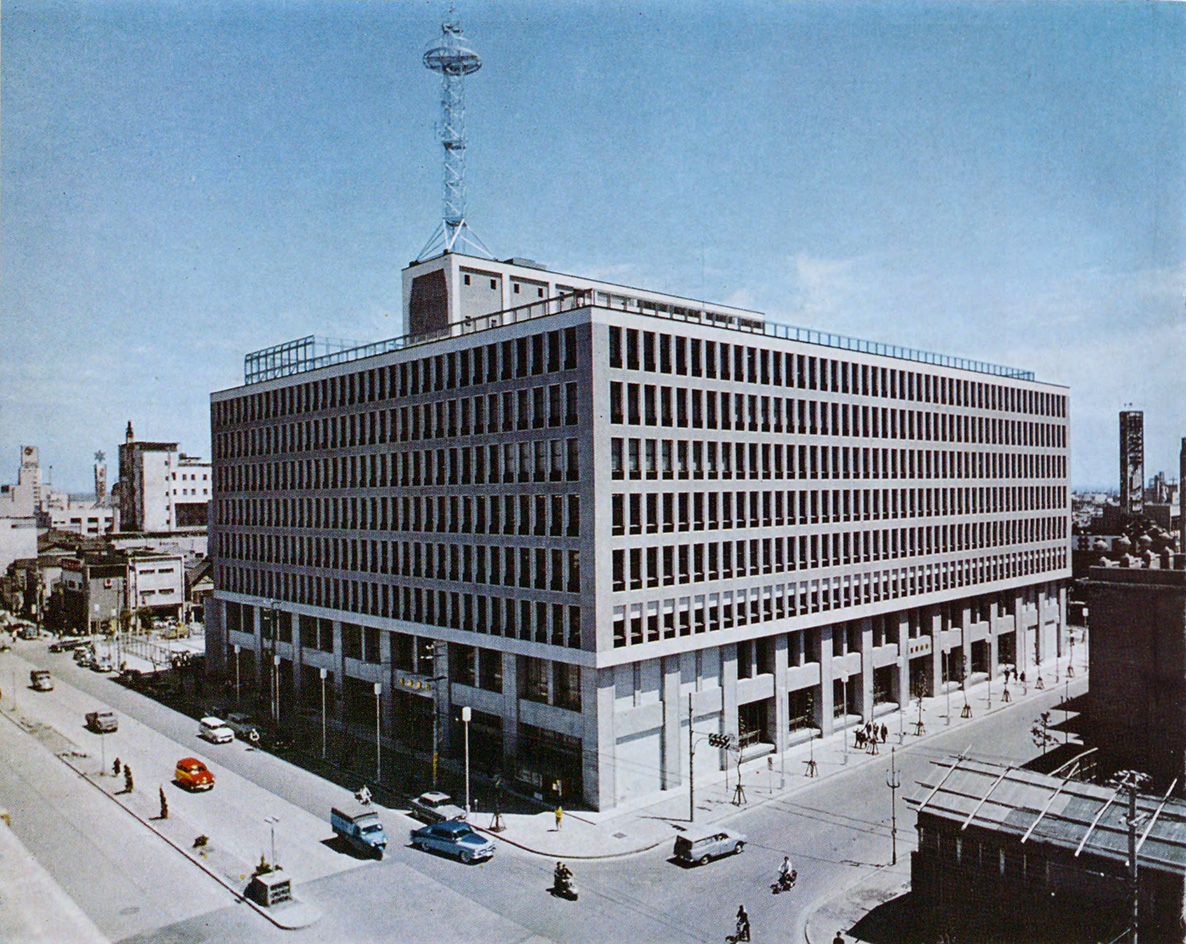
- Head office building of Tokai Bank upon completion in 1961, later headquarters of UFJ Bank in Nagoya
- Native name: 東海銀行
- Company type: Privately held company
- Industry: Banking, financial services
- Founded: 1941
- Defunct: 2002
- Fate: Merged with Sanwa Bank and Toyo Trust and Banking
- Successor: UFJ Bank
- Headquarters: Nagoya, Japan
- Area served: Japan
- Products: Banking services

The Tokai Bank (東海銀行, Tokai ginkō) was a leading Japanese commercial bank based in Nagoya. In the second half of the 20th century, it was the dominant bank in the Chūkyō metropolitan area of central Japan, the home of Toyota and other manufacturing firms.

Tokai Bank was formed by merger during World War II, and eventually merged in 2000-2002 with Sanwa Bank and Toyo Trust and Banking to form UFJ Bank, a predecessor of Mitsubishi UFJ Financial Group.

== History ==
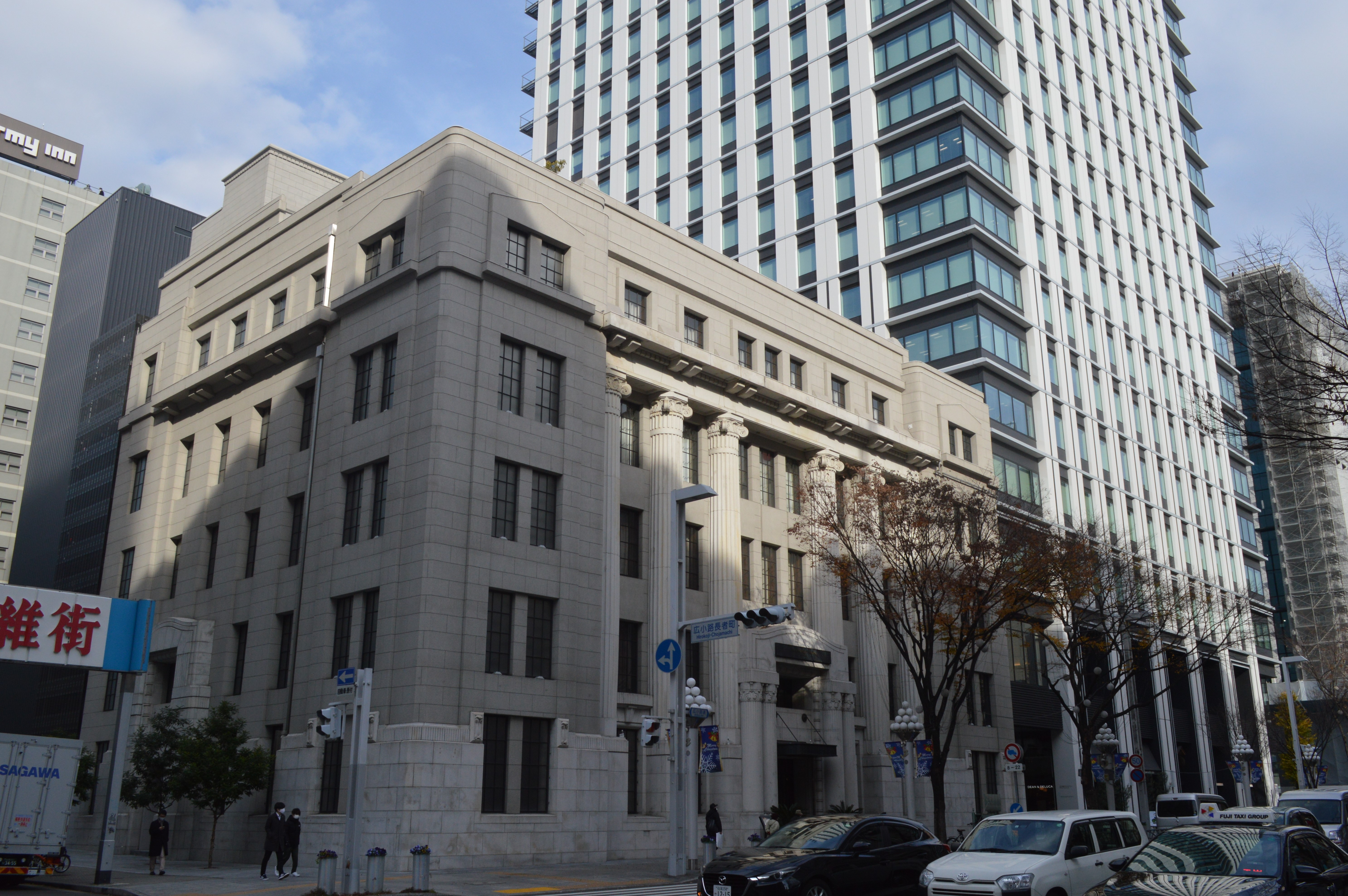
Former head office building of Nagoya Bank

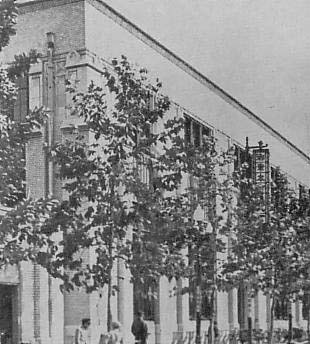
Former head office building of Aichi Bank in Nagoya, photographed in the 1930s

The Tokai (lit. 'East Sea', namely the Sea of Japan) Bank was established in 1941, before Japan's entry into World War II though well into the Second Sino-Japanese War. It resulted from the merger of three smaller banks of roughly equal size, namely the Ito Bank (est. 1881), Nagoya Bank (est. 1882), and Aichi Bank (est. 1896), all three based in Nagoya. The latter was itself the continuation of the Eleventh National Bank, originally established in 1877 under the system of National Banks in Meiji Japan (not to be confused with a later bank also named Aichi Bank).

After the war ended, the Tokai Bank was deemed by the Allied occupation authorities not to have contributed significantly to the war effort, and was thus permitted to keep its management and its name. In 1947 it obtained a foreign exchange license. In 1962, under new legislation, Tokai Bank separated its trust banking operations as the Chuo Trust & Banking Company. It opened offices in Tokyo and Osaka, then an office in New York in 1954, a first overseas branch in London in 1963, then converted the New York office into a branch in 1965. Additional offices were opened in the 1970s in Los Angeles, Amsterdam, Hong Kong, Zurich, Sydney, and Singapore. By then, the Toyota Motor Corporation was Tokai Bank's most important customer and also became the bank's largest shareholder.

In 2000, Tokai Bank initially entered talks with Sanwa Bank and Asahi Bank. Asahi eventually pulled out of the negotiations, but these were expanded to Toyo Trust and Banking and eventually led to the formation of UFJ Bank in 2002.

== See also ==
- List of banks in Japan

== Sources ==
- Tokai Bank at the Encyclopædia Britannica
