= MUFG Americas Holdings Corporation =

American bank holding company

- The 2014-present logo
- Type: Subsidiary
- Founded: July 5, 1964; 62 years ago, as The Bank of California; May 1, 1972; 54 years ago, as Bancal Tri-State Corporation; April 1, 1996; 30 years ago, as UnionBanCal Corporation; July 1, 2014; 12 years ago, as MUFG Americas Holdings Corporation
- Headquarters: 1251 Avenue of the Americas; New York City, U.S.
- Key people: Kevin Cronin (CEO); Masatoshi Komoriya (executive chairman)
- Products: Financial services
- Total assets: $44.127 billion (June 30, 2023)
- Total equity: $12.777 billion (June 30, 2023)
- Parent: MUFG Bank
- Website: mufgamericas.com

MUFG Americas Holdings Corporation is an intermediate bank holding company based in New York City. It is a wholly owned subsidiary of MUFG Bank, a member of the Japanese Mitsubishi UFJ Financial Group conglomerate. The company provides corporate banking services, investment banking, and treasury management / working capital services to corporate clients.

== History ==
The company traces its roots to The Bank of California founded in 1864. It became Bancal Tri-State Corporation in 1972, UnionBanCal Corporation in 1996, and MUFG Americas Holdings Corporation in 2014.

In December 2022, it sold its consumer banking subsidiary, MUFG Union Bank, to U.S. Bancorp.
