= Bank Danamon =

Indonesian bank

PT Bank Danamon Indonesia Tbk
- Type: Public
- Traded as: IDX: BDMN
- Industry: Financial services
- Founded: 16 July 1956; 70 years ago
- Headquarters: Jakarta, Indonesia
- Key people: Daisuke Ejima (president director)
- Revenue: ▲ Rp 14.579 trillion (2019)
- Net income: ▲ Rp 4.074 trillion (2019)
- Total assets: ▲ Rp 193.53 trillion (2019)
- Total equity: ▲ Rp 45.41 trillion (2019)
- Number of employees: 8,926 (2020)
- Parent: MUFG Bank
- Subsidiaries: Adira Quantum Multifinance; Adira Dinamika Multi Finance; Bank Danamon Indonesia (P.T.) Cayman Island
- Website: www.danamon.co.id

PT Bank Danamon Indonesia Tbk is an Indonesian bank established in 1956. It is the sixth largest bank in Indonesia by asset size.

== History ==
Bank Nusantara Parahyangan logo

In December 2017, Japan's Mitsubishi UFJ Financial Group (MUFG) bought a 19.9% stake in Danamon from Temasek Holdings for Rp 15.875 trillion ($1.17 billion). The price indicated Danamon was valued at about $6 billion. In July 2018, Indonesia's Financial Services Authority (OJK) approved MUFG's plan to purchase a further 20.1% stake from Asia Financial. In April 2019, MUFG announced the merger of Danamon and Bank Nusantara Parahyangan (BNP). The merger resulted in MUFG becoming the majority shareholders with 94.1% stake of Bank Danamon.

In December 2019, Danamon sold most of its share of Adira Insurance to Zurich Insurance Company, making Danamon a minority shareholder.

== Works cited ==
- Serikat Pekerja Danamon
