= MUFG Union Bank =

Former American bank

UnionBank
- Final logo from 2017 to 2022.
- Industry: Banking
- Founded: 1864; 162 years ago (as The Bank of California); 1996; 30 years ago (as Union Bank of California); 2008; 18 years ago (as UnionBank)
- Founder: Kaspare Cohn
- Defunct: December 1, 2022; 3 years ago
- Fate: Acquired by U.S. Bancorp
- Headquarters: 1251 Avenue of the Americas; New York City, U.S.
- Key people: Kevin Cronin (CEO); Masatoshi Komoriya (executive chairman); Greg Seibly (president and Head of Regional Banking)

The company's logo

The former Union Bank logo by Pentagram used from 1996 to 2008

Former Union Bank logo by Landor Associates from December 2008 to November 2017

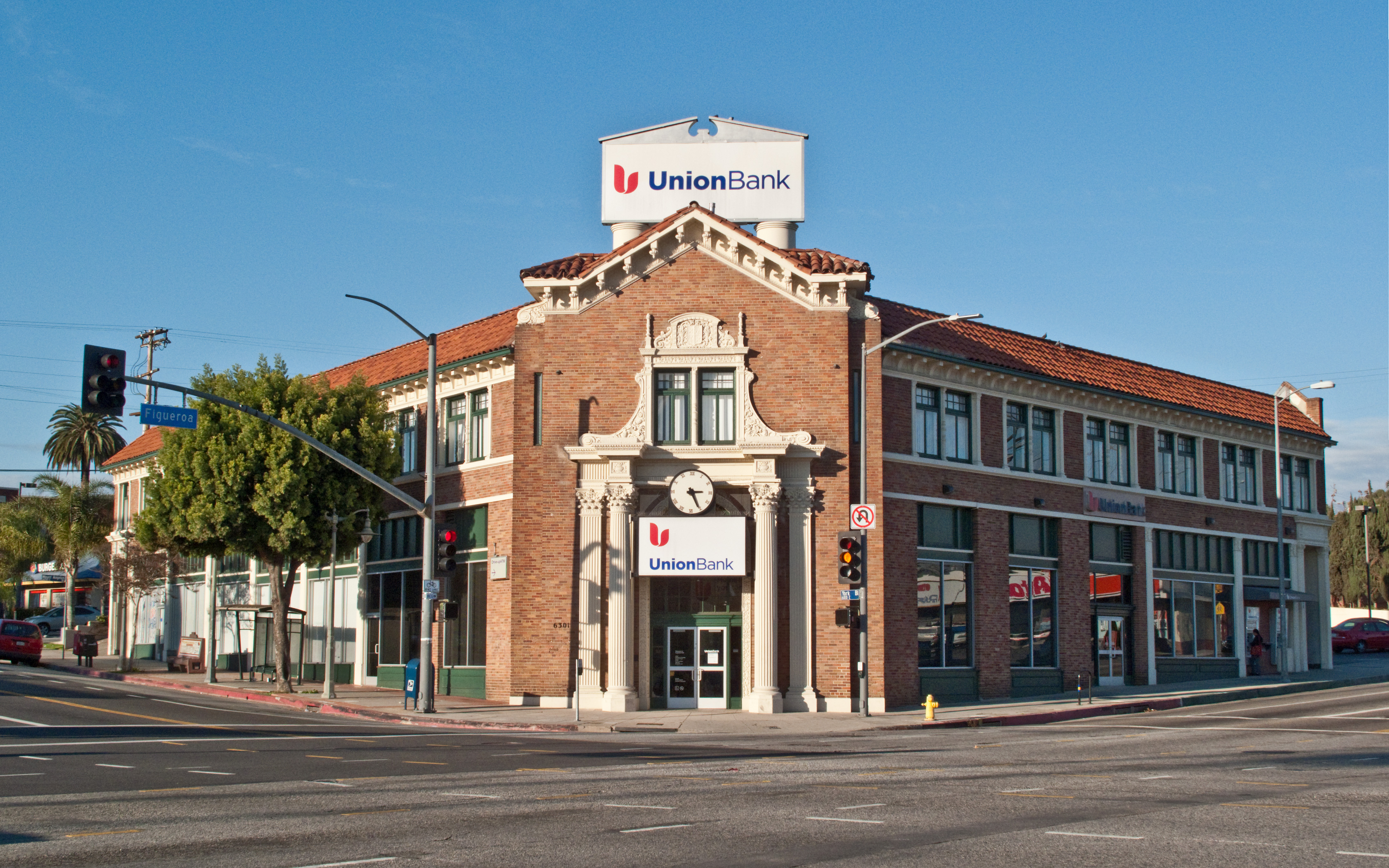
A branch in Los Angeles

Union Bank was an American national bank with 398 branches in California, Washington, and Oregon. It was owned by MUFG Americas Holdings Corporation and was acquired by U.S. Bancorp in December 2022. It was headquartered in New York City and had commercial branches in Dallas, Houston, New York City, and Chicago, and two international offices.

== History ==
=== Union Bank ===
In 1914, Kaspare Cohn founded Kaspare Cohn Commercial & Savings Bank in Los Angeles. It was renamed Union Bank & Trust Company of Los Angeles in 1918. Harry Volk was recruited from Prudential Insurance Company as the bank's new CEO in 1957 and pioneered the use of the one-bank holding company, among other banking innovations. Volk retired in 1980 after the purchase of the bank by London-based Standard Chartered Bank in 1979.

=== MUFG Bank, Ltd. ===
In May 1996, Mitsubishi Bank and the Bank of Tokyo merged.

In August 2008, Mitsubishi UFJ offered to buy the 35% of Union Bank it did not already own, which Union Bank accepted.

On November 4, 2008, the Bank of Tokyo-Mitsubishi UFJ (BTMU), a wholly owned subsidiary of Mitsubishi UFJ Financial Group (MUFG), announced that BTMU had successfully acquired all of the outstanding shares of UnionBanCal Corporation.

In 2014, MUFG integrated the U.S. operations of its subsidiary The Bank of Tokyo-Mitsubishi UFJ, Ltd. (BTMU) with those of San Francisco–based Union Bank, N.A.

In April 2018, the Bank of Tokyo-Mitsubishi UFJ, Ltd. (BTMU) was renamed to MUFG Bank, Ltd.

When it was called MUFG UnionBank, it was a subsidiary of intermediate holding company, MUFG Americas Holdings Corporation, and a member of the Mitsubishi UFJ Financial Group.

In December 2022, the bank was acquired by U.S. Bancorp for $8 billion.

=== Acquisitions ===
Date	Acquired	Source
1864	Bank of California	
1883	First National Bank	
1905	The London and San Francisco Bank	
1918	The Bank of Personal Service	
1952	The Bank of Tokyo of California	
1957	Occidental Savings & Commercial Bank (North Hollywood)	
1958	Union Bank	
1967	Southern California First National Bank	
1972	Mitsubishi Bank of California	
1975	California First Bank	
1984	Bancal Tri-State Corporation – bank holding company for The Bank of California	
2002	First Western Bank	
2004	Business Bank of California	
2010	Frontier Bank	
2010	Tamalpais Bank	
2012	Pacific Capital Bancorp – bank holding company for Santa Barbara Bank & Trust	
2013	First Bank Association Bank Services	

== Controversies ==
On October 19, 2004, the Federal Reserve Board announced that Union Bank had entered into a written agreement to avoid criminal prosecution for money laundering. Three years later, Union Bank was again accused of money-laundering and in September 2007, the bank agreed to pay $31.6 million in penalties and forfeitures to settle government claims that it had been implicated in an elaborate drug money laundering scheme involving Mexican exchange houses known as casas de cambio.
