= MUFG =

Japanese bank holding and financial services company

Mitsubishi UFJ Financial Group, Inc.

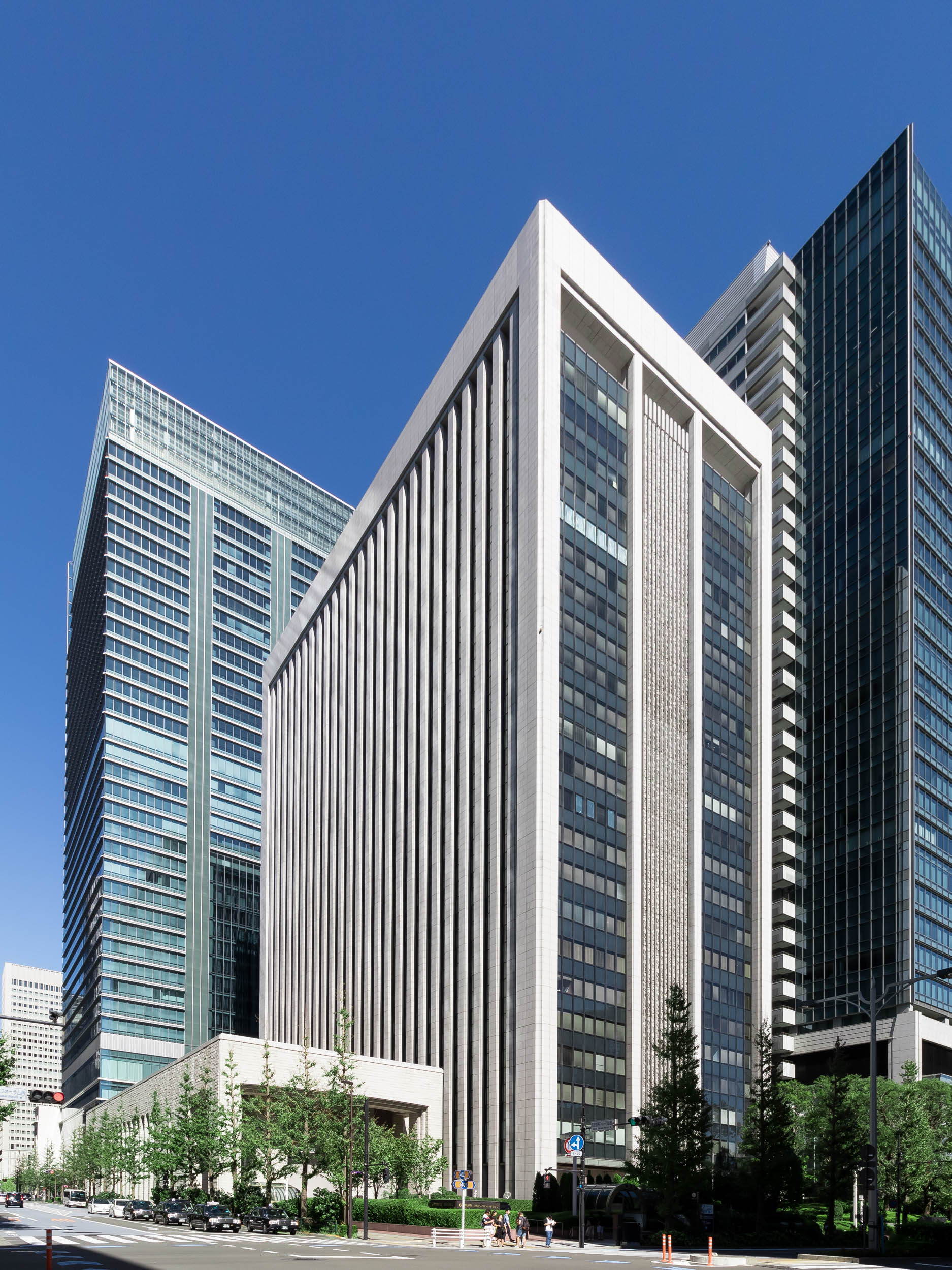
- Headquarters in Marunouchi, Tokyo; former head office of Mitsubishi Bank, then of Bank of Tokyo-Mitsubishi
- Native name: 株式会社三菱UFJフィナンシャル・グループ
- Romanized name: Kabushiki gaisha Mitsubishi Yūefujei Finansharu Gurūpu
- Type: Public
- Traded as: TYO: 8306; NAG: 8306; NYSE: MUFG (ADS); Nikkei 225 component (TYO); TOPIX Core30 component (TYO)
- Industry: Financial services
- Predecessor: Mitsubishi Tokyo Financial Group; UFJ Holdings
- Founded: 1 October 2005; 21 years ago (by merger)
- Headquarters: 2-7-1 Marunouchi, Chiyoda, Tokyo, Japan
- Area served: Worldwide
- Key people: Hironori Kamezawa (chairman); Jun'ichi Hanzawa (president and Group CEO)
- Products: Asset management; Banking; Commodities; Credit cards; Equities trading; Insurance; Investment management; Mortgage loans; Private equity; Wealth management
- Revenue: ▲¥14.62 trillion (US$92.35 billion) (FY2026)
- Operating income: ▲¥3.41 trillion (US$21.54 billion) (FY2026)
- Net income: ▲¥2.43 trillion (US$15.33 billion) (FY2026)
- Total assets: ▲¥431.73 trillion (US$2.73 trillion) (FY2026)
- Total equity: ▲¥23.74 trillion (US$149.98 billion) (FY2026)
- Owner: Mitsubishi Group
- Number of employees: 150,800 (2025)
- Subsidiaries: MUFG Bank; Mitsubishi UFJ Trust and Banking Corporation; Mitsubishi UFJ Securities; Mitsubishi UFJ NICOS; Mitsubishi UFJ Lease & Finance; Morgan Stanley(23.3%); Bank of Ayudhya; Bank Danamon
- Website: mufg.jp

Mitsubishi UFJ Financial Group, Inc. (MUFG; 株式会社三菱UFJフィナンシャル・グループ, Kabushiki gaisha Mitsubishi Yūefujei Finansharu Gurūpu) is a Japanese bank holding and financial services company headquartered in Chiyoda, Tokyo, Japan. MUFG was created in 2005 by merger between Mitsubishi Tokyo Financial Group (株式会社三菱東京フィナンシャル・グループ, Kabushiki kaisha mitsubishi tōkyō finansharu gurūpu) and UFJ Holdings (株式会社UFJホールディングス; kabushikigaisha yūefujei hōrudingusu). These two groups in turn brought together multiple predecessor banks including Mitsubishi Bank (est. 1880), Yokohama Specie Bank (est. 1880 as a policy bank, reorganized after World War II as Bank of Tokyo), Sanwa Bank (est. 1933 by merger of prior institutions), and Tokai Bank (est. 1941 by merger).

MUFG holds assets of around US$2.7 trillion as of 2024 and is the parent company of fully owned MUFG Bank (branded Bank of Tokyo Mitsubishi UFJ or BTMU until July 2018), Mitsubishi UFJ Trust and Banking Corporation, Mitsubishi UFJ Securities, Mitsubishi UFJ Capital, and MUFG Americas Holdings Corporation; majority shareholder of Bank Danamon in Indonesia, Bank of Ayudhya in Thailand, and Mitsubishi UFJ NICOS in Japan; and a large minority shareholder in the Master Trust Bank of Japan, Morgan Stanley in the United States, Security Bank in the Philippines, and Vietinbank in Vietnam. It retains strong links with the Mitsubishi Group and is often described as one of that group's "Three Great Houses", together with Mitsubishi Corporation and Mitsubishi Heavy Industries.

MUFG is Japan's largest financial group and one of the world's ten largest bank holding companies holding around US$1.5 trillion (JP¥227 trillion) in deposits as of April 2024. In Japan, it is the largest of the three so-called megabanks with $2.9 trillion in total assets at end-March 2023, ahead of SMBC Group ($2.0 trillion) and Mizuho Financial Group ($1.9 trillion).

== History ==
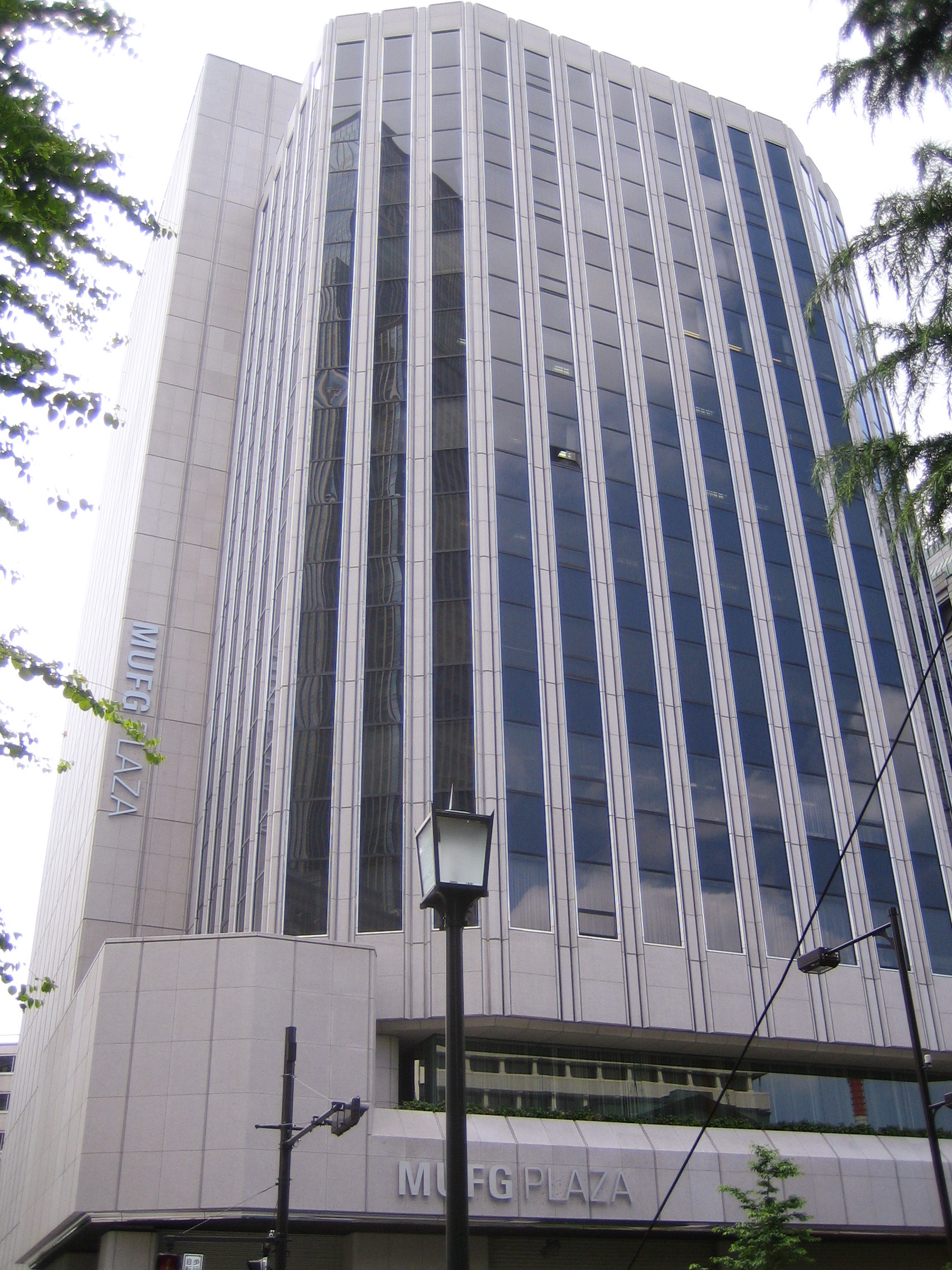
Former head office of Bank of Tokyo in Nihonbashi, Tokyo

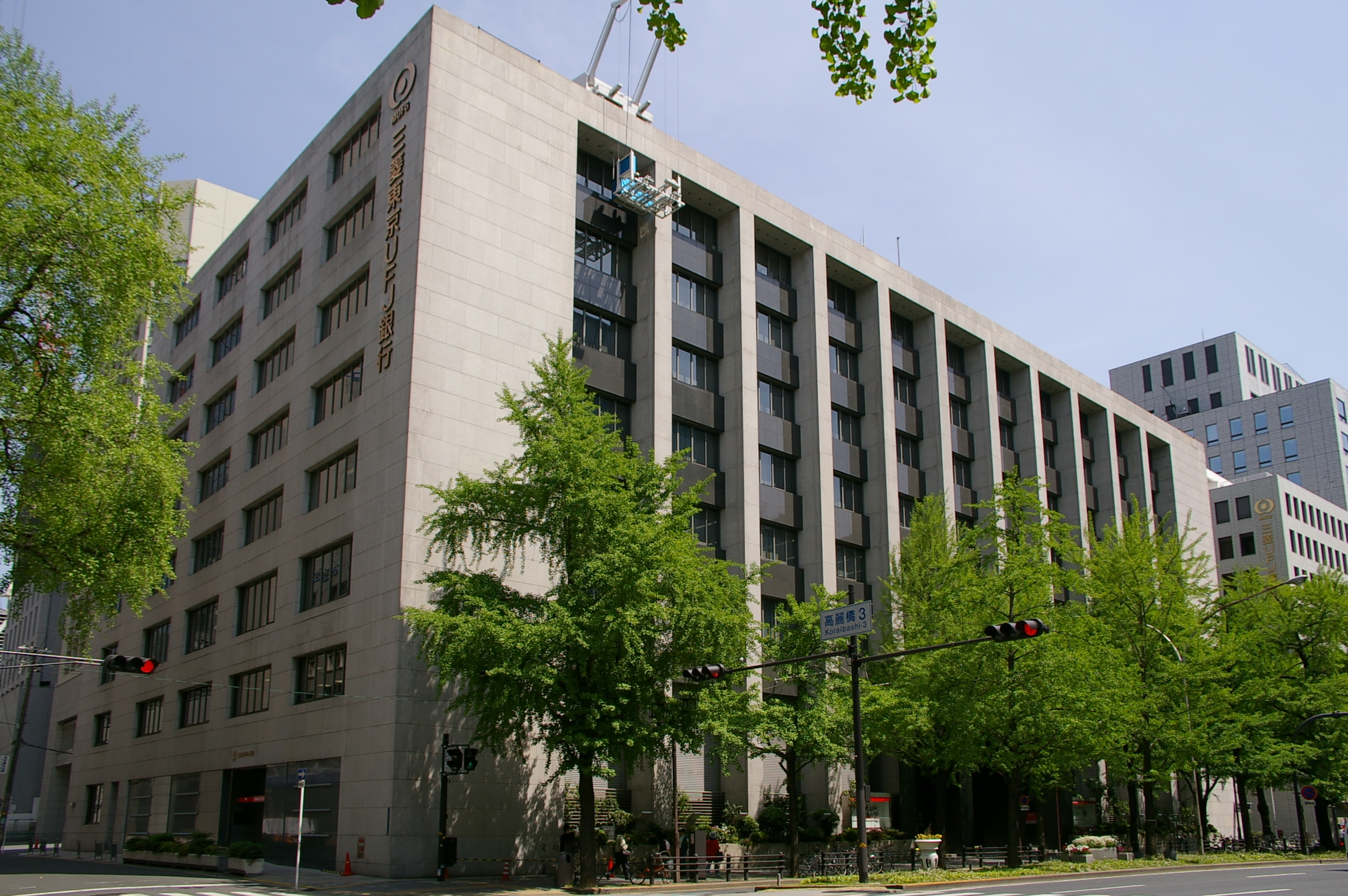
Former head office of Sanwa Bank in Osaka

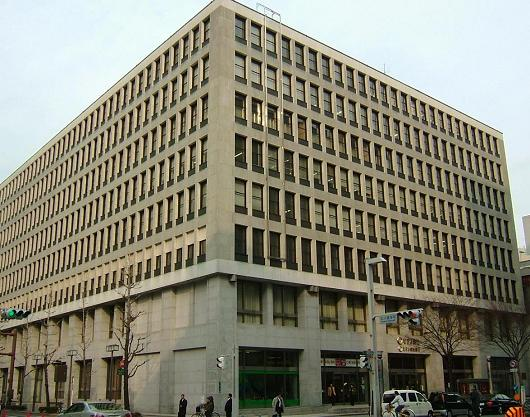
Former head office of Tokai Bank, then UFJ Bank in Nagoya

MUFG was formed by three successive mergers in a sequence that lasted less than a decade, respectively between Bank of Tokyo and Mitsubishi Bank in 1996, between Sanwa Bank, Tokai Bank and Toyo Trust and Banking in 2000–2002, and between the two resulting entities in 2005. The institutions involved in these mergers combined multiple threads of Japanese financial history, going back to the early Meiji era. MUFG incorporates several of the National Banks in Meiji Japan, which were numbered in accordance with their chronological date of establishment between 1873 and 1880:

- the 8th National Bank, est. 1877 in Toyohashi, merged 1886 into the 134th National Bank;
- the 11th National Bank, est. 1877 in Nagoya, merged 1896 with the 134th National Bank to form Aichi Bank, a predecessor of Tokai Bank;
- the 13th National Bank, est. 1877 in Osaka, renamed the Konoike Bank in 1897, a predecessor of Sanwa Bank;
- the 25th National Bank, est. 1877 in Obama, Fukui, merged 1927–1928 with Tsuruga Bank then 1938 into Owada Bank, another predecessor of Sanwa Bank;
- the 30th National Bank, est. 1878 in Tokyo, acquired 1929 by the 34th Bank;
- the 31st National Bank, est. 1878 in Wakamatsu, merged 1888 with the 148th National Bank (see below);
- the 34th National Bank, est. 1878 in Osaka, renamed 1896 as 34th Bank or Sanjushi Bank, a predecessor of Sanwa Bank;
- the 42nd National Bank, est. 1878 in Osaka, restructured 1897 into Kitahama Bank then renamed 1919 into Setsuo Bank, merged 1926 into the 34th Bank;
- the 43rd National Bank, est. 1878 in Wakayama, split up 1930 into several entities including Daido Bank which merged into the 34th Bank;
- the 95th National Bank, est. 1878 in Tokyo, merged 1925 into Yamaguchi Bank (see 148th bank below) after several name changes;
- the 100th National Bank, est. 1878 in Tokyo, reorganized 1898 as the 100th Bank or Daihyaku Bank, merged 1927 with Kawasaki Bank and absorbed 1943 by Mitsubishi Bank;
- the 119th National Bank, est. 1879 in Tokyo, a predecessor of Mitsubishi Bank;
- the 121st National Bank, est. 1879 in Osaka, absorbed 1897 by the 34th Bank;
- the 134th National Bank, est. 1879 in Nagoya, merged 1896 with the 11th National Bank to form Aichi Bank;
- the 143rd National Bank, est. 1879 in Yachimata, merged 1880 into the 30th Bank;
- the 148th National Bank, est. 1879 in Osaka, reorganized 1898 as Yamaguchi Bank, a predecessor of Sanwa Bank;
- the 149th National Bank, est. 1879 in Hakodate, merged 1885 into the 119th National Bank.

=== Bank of Tokyo-Mitsubishi merger ===
Mitsubishi Bank and the Bank of Tokyo merged in 1996 to form the Bank of Tokyo-Mitsubishi, which at that point was the world's largest bank in terms of total assets. The Bank of Tokyo had historically focused on foreign exchange business since its foundation as the Yokohama Specie Bank in 1880, while Mitsubishi Bank had had a stronger focus on domestic corporate and retail banking. Both banks were relatively healthy in the wake of the Japanese asset price bubble. The merged bank was the fully owned subsidiary of Mitsubishi Tokyo Financial Group (MTFG), based in Tokyo.

=== Sanwa-Tokai-Toyo merger into UFJ ===
Until the Tokyo-Mitsubishi merger in 1996, Sanwa Bank, which was based in Osaka and was the anchor of the Sanwa Group keiretsu, had been considered the strongest bank in Japan, and it had aimed to be the world's largest bank during the "bubble era". By 2000, however, Sanwa was the fourth largest bank in Japan. It entered into merger talks with two other large banks, Asahi Bank and Tokai Bank, to create the world's third-largest bank by assets. Asahi pulled out of these talks later that year, and eventually became part of Resona Holdings. By 2001, The Toyo Trust & Banking Co. had been added to the merger and the combined company was to be called United Financial Holdings. The merger was completed in 2002 and the new bank was officially named UFJ Bank Ltd.

UFJ Bank was headquartered in Nagoya, the historical headquarters of Tokai Bank, while its parent UFJ Holdings (UFJH) was based in Osaka. During its short life, the group was plagued by bad debt problems and by infighting between the employees of its predecessor companies. UFJ was one of the largest shareholders of Toyota. The Chairman of Toyota was a director on its board during the financial scandals and indictments of three UFJ executives.

=== Formation of Mitsubishi UFJ Financial Group ===
In July 2004, UFJ Holdings, by then Japan's fourth-largest financial group, offered to merge with the Mitsubishi Tokyo Financial Group. UFJ had been accused by the government of corruption and making bad loans to the yakuza crime syndicates. Three of its former executives were arrested in the same year over banking law violations that involved bad debts. The takeover of UFJ by the Mitsubishi Tokyo Financial Group was challenged by the Sumitomo Mitsui Financial Group which launched a competing takeover bid. MTFG ultimately prevailed in the fight, which appeared to signal an end to the clubby atmosphere that had prevailed in Japan's postwar banking industry. MUFG and SMFG eventually settled the legal dispute for 2.5 billion yen in late 2006.

The merged holding company MUFG, based on Tokyo, was formed on 1 October 2005 from the merger of MTFG and UFJH. The two banks, Bank of Tokyo-Mitsubishi and UFJ Bank, merged on 1 January 2006 to form MUFG Bank. The latter transaction was originally scheduled to take place on 1 October 2005, the same day that the parent companies were merged. However, pressure from Japan's Financial Services Agency, which wanted to ensure the smooth systems integration of the two banking giants, caused the merger of the banks to be postponed for three months. The trust banking and securities units of MTFG and UFJ were merged according to the original schedule on 1 October 2005.

=== Subsequent developments ===
Mitsubishi Bank and the Bank of Tokyo each had significant banking subsidiaries in California (Bank of California and Union Bank respectively) before their merger. At the time of the merger, these U.S. banks also merged to form UnionBanCal Corporation. BTM listed UnionBanCal on the New York Stock Exchange in 1999. In 2008, BTMU purchased all of the outstanding shares of UnionBanCal. BTMU moved its New York-based banking operations to Union Bank and renamed the company MUFG Union Bank in 2014.

BTMU was investigated by New York banking regulators over its role in routing payments for Iranian customers through its New York branch in violation of U.S. sanctions. BTMU settled with the state for $250 million in 2013. A second settlement was reached for $315 million in 2014 after it was found that PricewaterhouseCoopers had altered an investigation report on the issue; PwC itself was fined $25 million in relation to the matter.

In September 2008, MUFG signed a letter of intent with Morgan Stanley to form an alliance and purchase 20% of the American firm.

In 2008 at the 2008 ALB Japan Law Awards, Mitsubishi UFJ was crowned:

- In-House of the Year – Japan Investment Bank In-House Team of the Year
- Deal of the Year – Debt Market Deal of the Year

In April 2011, MUFG and Morgan Stanley entered into an agreement to convert MUFG's outstanding convertible preferred stock in Morgan Stanley into Morgan Stanley stock.

In June 2011, MUFG took a 9.99 percent stake in Lynas Corp, an Australian rare earths developer.

On 1 April 2018, the bank was renamed to MUFG Bank Ltd. This name change aligned the bank name with the holding company name by removing "Tokyo" from the name.

On 31 October 2018, MUFG to acquire Australian Asset Manager, First Sentier Group.

== Group structure ==
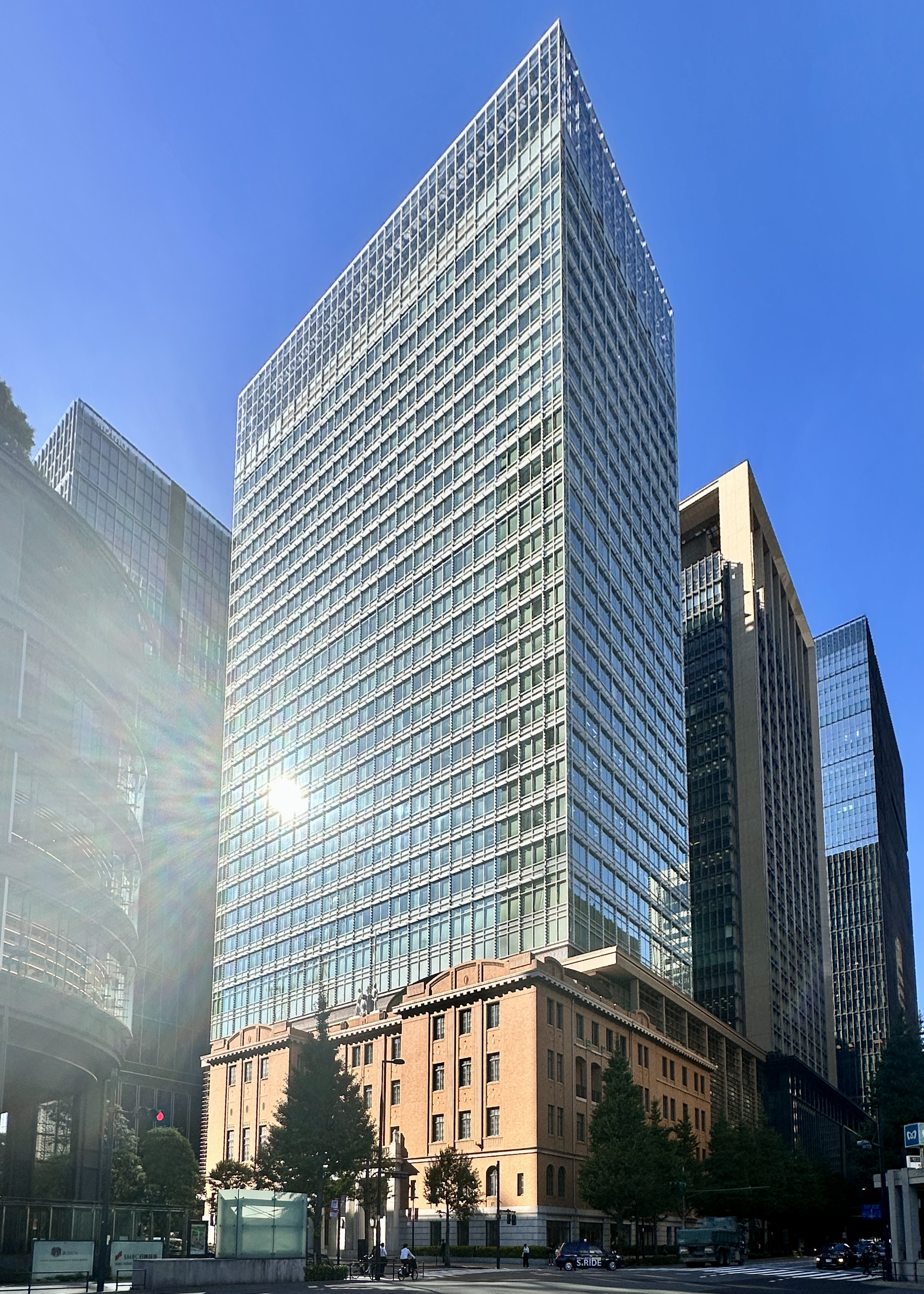
Head office of Mitsubishi UFJ Trust & Banking in Tokyo, with the reconstructed Industry Club of Japan building in foreground

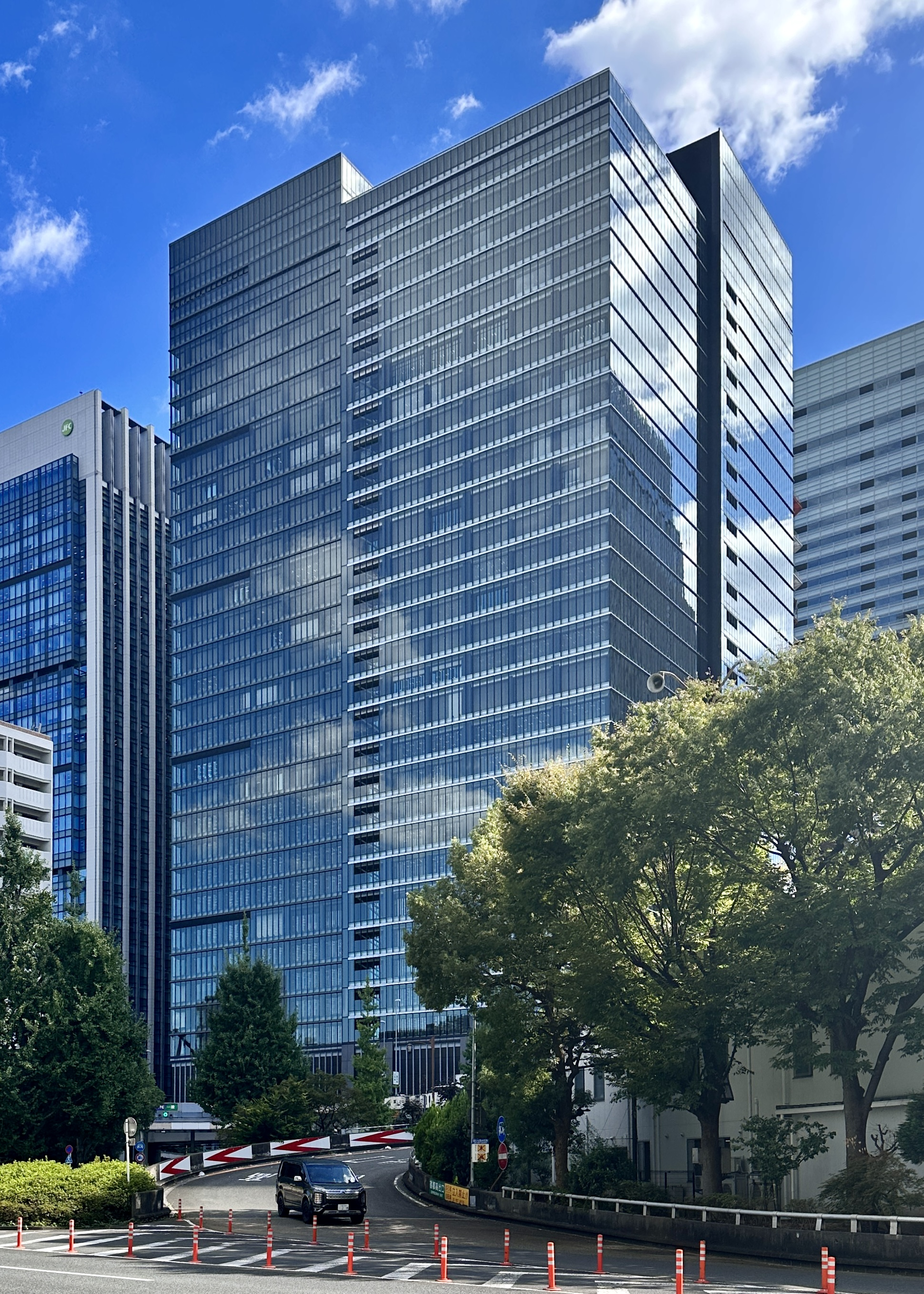
Otemachi Financial City Grand Cube building, head office of Mitsubishi UFJ Securities

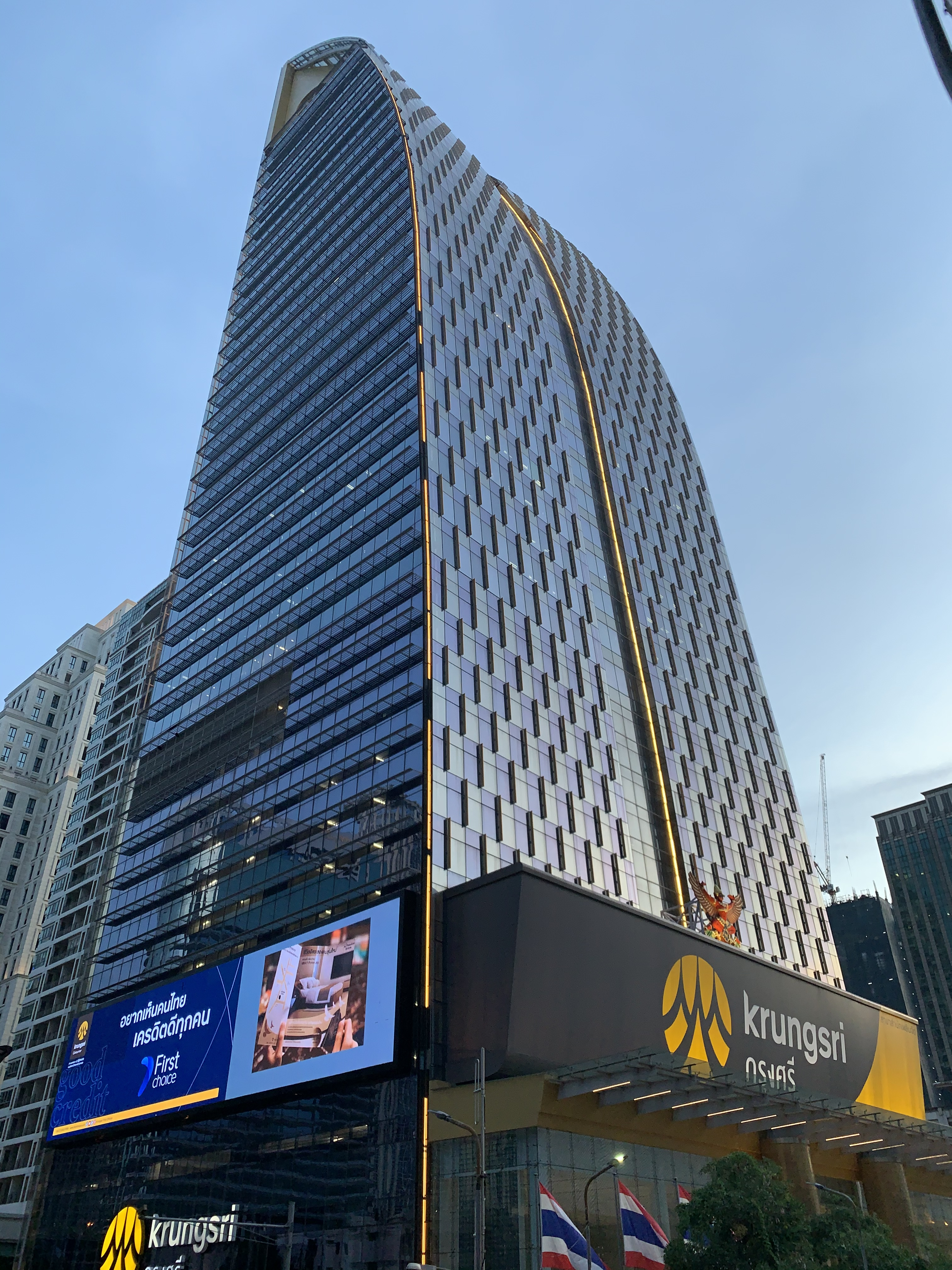
Head office tower of Bank of Ayudhya in Bangkok

=== Majority-owned banks ===
- MUFG Bank, Ltd.
- UnionBanCal Corporation in the United States (approx 63% in Feb 2005; 68% in 2004; 100% in 2008)
- Bank Danamon in Indonesia (92.47%)
- Bank of Ayudhya in Thailand (76.88% on 5 January 2015; 72% on 19 December 2013)
- Security Bank, semi-major bank in the Philippines
- Jibun Bank Corporation, online bank

=== Minority-owned banks ===
- The Chukyo Bank, Ltd. (39.9%)
- The Master Trust Bank of Japan, Ltd. (46.5%)
- Morgan Stanley (22.41%). On 29 September 2008, Mitsubishi UFJ Financial Group announced that it would acquire a shareholding in Morgan Stanley for US$9 billion. In the midst of the October 2008 stock market crash, concerns over the completion of the Mitsubishi deal caused a dramatic fall in Morgan Stanley's stock price to levels last seen in 1994. Morgan Stanley's share price recovered considerably after Mitsubishi UFJ closed the deal on 14 October 2008.
  - The payment from MUFG was supposed to be wired electronically; however, because it needed to be made on an emergency basis on Columbus Day when banks were closed in the US, MUFG cut a US$9 billion physical check, the largest amount written via physical check at the time. The physical check was accepted by Robert A. Kindler, Global Head of Mergers and Acquisitions and Vice Chairman of Morgan Stanley, at the offices of Wachtell Lipton.
- Chong Hing Bank (9.66%)
- Vietinbank (20%), with which the Group decided to establish a strategic partnership in December 2012

=== Other associated companies ===
- Trust bank
  - Mitsubishi UFJ Trust and Banking Corporation
- Microfinance
  - Hattha Kaksekar (Cambodia microfinance institution)
- Securities
  - Mitsubishi UFJ Securities Holdings (intermediate holding company)
    - Mitsubishi UFJ Securities (a retail joint venture between with Morgan Stanley)
    - Morgan Stanley MUFG Securities Co., Ltd. (a joint venture between MUFG and Morgan Stanley)
    - Mitsubishi UFJ Morgan Stanley PB Securities Co., Ltd. (private banking brokerage business entities)
    - Mitsubishi UFJ eSmart Securities Co., Ltd. (Internet-only securities)
- Lease
  - Mitsubishi UFJ Lease & Finance Company Limited
  - BOT Lease Co., Ltd.
  - Hitachi Capital Corporation
- Research and consulting
  - Mitsubishi UFJ Research and Consulting Co., Ltd
  - Mitsubishi Asset Brains
  - Mitsubishi UFJ Trust Investment Engineering Laboratory
- System
  - Mitsubishi Research Institute DCS
  - Mitsubishi UFJ Information Technology, Ltd.
  - Mitsubishi UFJ Trust Systems Co., Ltd.
  - MUS information Systems Co., Ltd.
  - MU Business Engineering
- Asset management
  - The Master Trust Bank of Japan
- Asset management
  - Mitsubishi UFJ Kokusai Asset Management Co., Ltd.
  - MU Investment Advisor
  - MUFG Investor Services
- Venture capital
  - Mitsubishi UFJ Capital
- Wealth management
  - Mitsubishi UFJ Wealth Management Securities
  - Mitsubishi UFJ Personal Financial Advisors
- Factoring
  - Mitsubishi UFJ Factor
- Securities agency
  - Japan share holder service
- Banking agency
  - Mitsubishi UFJ Financial Partners
- Foreign currency exchange
  - Tokyo Credit Services, Ltd.
- Consumer finance
  - Acom (equity-method affiliate)
- Cards and credit sales
  - Mitsubishi UFJ NICOS
  - RYOSHIN DCCARD CO., LTD.
  - JACCS CO., LTD. (affiliated company accounted for by the equity method)
  - JALCARD, Inc.
  - Tokyo Credit Services, Ltd.
- Finance
  - Unlimited Japanese housing (unlimited company)
- Real estate
  - Mitsubishi UFJ Real Estate Services Co., Ltd.
- Debt collection
  - MU Frontier Servicer Co., Ltd
- Public interest corporation
  - Foundation Mitsubishi UFJ Trust Scholarship Foundation
  - Mitsubishi UFJ Trust and Regional Culture Foundation
  - Mitsubishi UFJ Trust Arts Foundation
  - Mitsubishi UFJ International Foundation
  - Mitsubishi Economic Research Institute
  - Mitsubishi Foundation
  - Mitsubishi Yowa

== Major shareholders ==
As of 31 March 2013:

| Investment trusts managed by the Japan Trustee Services Bank | 7.47% |
| Investment trusts managed by The Master Trust Bank of Japan | 4.44% |
| Nippon Life | 2.01% |
| ADR Holders (held by the Bank of New York Mellon) | 1.94% |
| State Street | 1.53% |
| State Street (China clients) | 1.27% |
| Meiji Yasuda Life | 1.23% |
| JPMorgan Chase Bank, N.A. London Secs Lending Omnibus Account | 1.14% |
| Toyota | 1.05% |

== Leadership ==
- Group chairman: Hironori Kamezawa (since April 2026)
- President and group chief executive: Junichi Hanzawa (Since April 2026)

=== Former group chairmen ===
1. Ryosuke Tamakoshi (2005–2010)
2. Takamune Okihara (2010–2014)
3. Kiyoshi Sono (2014–2019)
4. Nobuyuki Hirano (2019–2021)
5. Kanetsugu Mike (2021–2026)

=== Former presidents and group chief executives ===
1. Nobuo Kuroyanagi (2005–2010)
2. Katsunori Nagayasu (2010–2013)
3. Nobuyuki Hirano (2013–2019)
4. Kanetsugu Mike (2019–2021)
5. Hironori Kamezawa (2021–2026)

== See also ==
- Bank of Tokyo-Mitsubishi UFJ Money Museum
- Loans in Japan
- List of banks in Japan
- List of systemically important banks
