= Private enterprise in Japan =

The engine of Japanese economic growth has been private initiative and enterprise, together with strong support and guidance from the government and from labor. The most numerous enterprises were single proprietorships, of which there were more than 4 million in the late 1980s. The dominant form of organization, however, is the corporation. In 1988 some 2 million corporations employed more than 30 million workers, or nearly half of the total labor force of 60.1 million people. Corporations range from large to small, but the favored type of organization is the joint-stock company, with directors, auditors, and yearly stockholders' meetings.

== History ==
Japan's postwar business system dates back to the dissolution of the zaibatsu during the Allied occupation. Central holding companies were dissolved and families and other owners were compensated with non-negotiable government bonds. Individual operating firms were then freed to act independently. At the same time, the government instituted antimonopoly legislation and formed the Fair Trade Commission. Together with agricultural land reform and the start of the labor movement, these measures helped introduce a degree of competition into markets that had not previously existed.

It was not long, however, before the spirit and the letter of these reform laws were neglected. During the 1950s, government guidance of industry often sidestepped the provisions of the law. While market forces determined the course of the vast majority of enterprise activities, adjustments in the allocation of bank credit and the formation of cartels favored the reemergence of conglomerate groupings (keiretsu). These groups competed vigorously with one another for market share both within and outside Japan, but they dominated lesser industry.

In contrast to the dualism of the prewar era--featuring a giant gap between modern, large enterprises and the smaller, traditional firms--the postwar system is more graduated. Interlocking production and sales arrangements between greater and smaller enterprises characterized corporate relations in most markets. The average Japanese business executive is well aware of the firms that lead production and sales in each industry and is sensitive to minute differentiations of rank among the many corporations.

== Types of corporations ==
At the top of the corporate system are three general types of corporate groupings. The first includes the corporate heirs of the Zaibatsu, (including many of the same firms). The second consists of corporations that formed around major commercial banks. The nation's six largest groupings are in these two categories. Mitsui, Mitsubishi, and Sumitomo are former zaibatsu, while other groupings were formed around the Fuji-Sankei, Sanwa, and Dai-ichi Kangyo banking giants. A third type of corporate grouping developed around large industrial producers.

The relations among the members of the first two types of groups are flexible, informal, and quite different from the holding company pattern of the prewar days. Coordination takes place at periodic gatherings of corporation presidents and chief executive officers. The purpose of these meetings is to exchange information and ideas rather than to command group operations in a formal way. The general trading firms associated with each group can also be used to coordinate group finance, production, and marketing policies, although none of these relationships is entirely exclusive. The practice of crossholding shares of group stock further cements these groups, and such holdings usually make up about 30 percent of the total group equity. Member corporations typically, although not exclusively, borrow from group banks.

Similar relationships characterize the third type of corporate group, which was established around a major industrial producer. Members of this group are often subsidiaries or affiliates of the parent firm or are regular subcontractors. Subsidiaries and contracting corporations normally build components for the parent firm and, because of their smaller size, afford several benefits to the parent. The larger firm can concentrate on final assembly and high value-added processes, while the smaller firm can perform specialized and labor-intensive tasks. Cash payments to the subcontractors are supplemented by commercial bills whose maturity can be postponed when the need arose. In the late 1980s, subcontracting firms accounted for more than 60 percent of Japan's 6 million small and medium-sized enterprises (those having fewer than 300 employees).

This characterization of the economy as consisting of neat, hierarchical corporate groupings is somewhat simplistic. In the 1970s and 1980s, a number of independent middle-sized firms-- especially in the services and retail trade--were busy catering to increasingly diversified and specialized markets. Unaffiliated with the nation's large conglomerates, these corporations dueled each other in a highly competitive market. Bankruptcies among such companies and the smaller firms were much more common than among the large enterprises. Small business was the main provider of employment for the Japanese--two-thirds of Japanese workers were employed by small firms throughout the 1980s--and thereby the source of consumer demand; small business engaged in almost half of business investment as well.

The issue of who controlled the enterprise system is complex. While theoretically corporations are owned by stockholders, individual stock-ownership fell throughout the 1970s and 1980s, and in 1990 it was less than 30 percent. Financial corporations accounted for the remainder. Relative to capital, almost all large corporations carry enormous debt, a phenomenon known as over-borrowing. Such an unbalanced capital structure results from the easy availability of credit from the main group bank and the network of corporate relations, which reduces the need to resort to capital markets. Corporate shareholder meetings are often only window dressing. Thugs sometimes terrorize stockholders, demanding payments to vote for management or refrain from exposing scandals. The auditing system also is not well developed. Until the late 1980s, few companies engaged outside auditors, and accounting practices gave corporations room to mislead both the public and the shareholders. The law was changed in 1981 to control this kind of excess, to enhance the power of auditors, and to reduce the number of stockholders in the employ of management. But in general, it seems that business management holds the reins of corporate control, often with little public accountability. The corporate system maintains itself by smoothing relations with the government bureaucracy, expanding benefits to workers and consumers, and increasingly engaging in public relations and philanthropy.

== See also ==
- List of Japanese companies
