= Mitsubishi UFJ Securities =

Japanese investment banking company

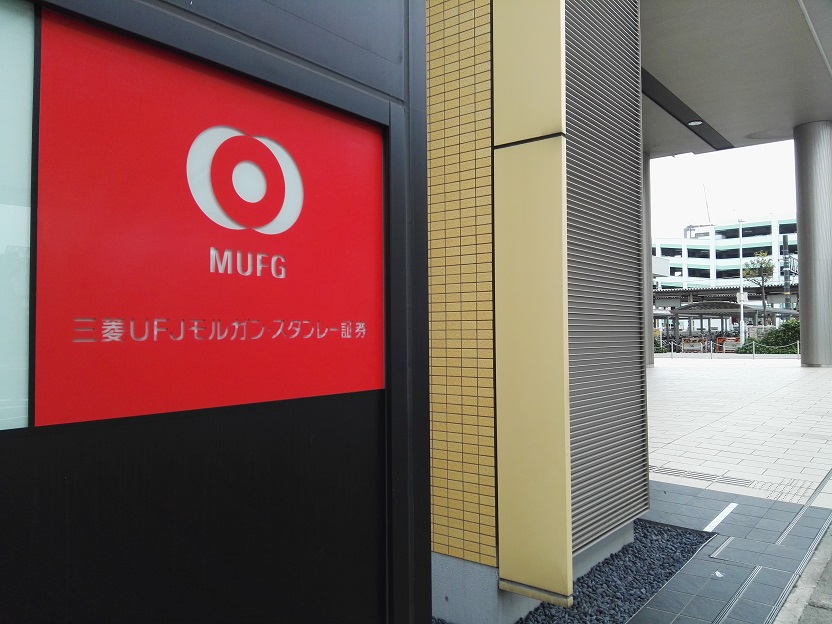
Mitsubishi-UFJ-Morgan-Stanley-Securities-Kariya

Mitsubishi UFJ Securities Co., Ltd. (三菱UFJ証券株式会社, Mitsubishi UFJ Shōken Kabushiki Kaisha), also known as MUFG Securities, is the investment banking arm of the Mitsubishi UFJ Financial Group (MUFG), a financial services company which is the largest in Japan measured by assets. The company is headquartered in Tokyo, Japan.

== Overview ==
Overview Mitsubishi UFJ Morgan Stanley Securities shares are held by Mitsubishi UFJ Securities Holdings Co., Ltd. and MM Partnership (a voluntary partnership between Mitsubishi UFJ Securities Holdings Co., Ltd. and Morgan Stanley Holdings, Inc. of America).

There are 51 branches (as of March 1, 2022). The company is also a member of the Sanwa Group's Midori-kai. Along with Nomura Securities (Nomura HD), Daiwa Securities (Daiwa Securities Group Inc.), SMBC Nikko Securities (SMFG), and Mizuho Securities (Mizuho FG), Mitsubishi UFJ Morgan Stanley Securities is one of the top five comprehensive securities companies in Japan.

== History ==
The company was established on October 1, 2005, when the firm's parent company, Mitsubishi UFJ Financial Group, was formed by the merger of Mitsubishi Tokyo Financial Group (MTFG) and UFJ Holdings. On the same day, the respective investment banking subsidiaries of MTFG and UFJ, Mitsubishi Securities Co., Ltd. (established in March 1948) and UFJ Tsubasa Securities Co., Ltd. (established in April 1948), were merged to form Mitsubishi UFJ Securities Co., Ltd. as a wholly owned subsidiary of MUFG.
