= Mitsubishi UFJ NICOS =

Credit Company in Japan

Mitsubishi UFJ NICOS Co., Ltd.
- Native name: 三菱UFJニコス株式会社
- Type: Public
- Traded as: TYO: 8583
- Industry: Financial services
- Predecessor: UFJ NICOS Co., Ltd. DC Card CO, LTD
- Founded: April 1, 2007 (Nippon Shinpan: June 7, 1951)
- Headquarters: Akihabara UDX, Chiyoda-ku, Tokyo, Japan
- Area served: Japan
- Services: Credit Cards
- Number of employees: 3,732 (2010)
- Parent: Mitsubishi UFJ Financial Group, Inc. (85%); Norinchukin Bank (15%)
- Website: www.cr.mufg.jp

Mitsubishi UFJ NICOS Co., Ltd., formerly named Nippon Shinpan, is a Japanese company. It was established in 1951 and became Japan's first and largest credit company during the post-World War Japanese economic boom.

== Shareholders ==
- Mitsubishi UFJ Financial Group (85%)
- Norinchukin Bank (15%)

== See also ==
- The Bank of Tokyo-Mitsubishi UFJ
- Visa Inc.
- MasterCard
- China UnionPay
- Edy
