= MUFG Bank =

Japanese bank

MUFG Bank, Ltd.

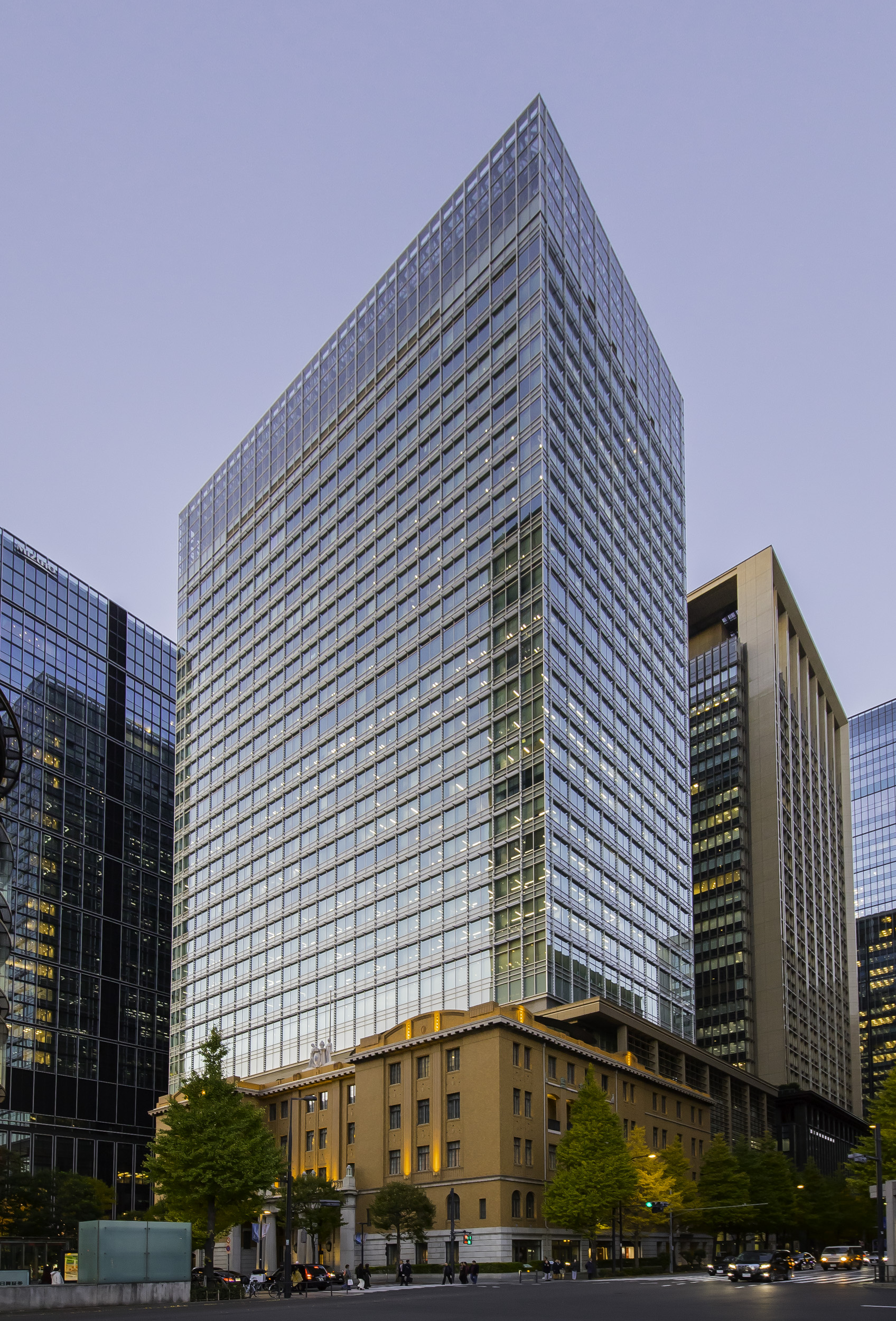
- Headquarters in Marunouchi
- Native name: 株式会社三菱UFJ銀行
- Formerly: The Bank of Tokyo-Mitsubishi UFJ, Ltd. (三菱東京UFJ銀行) (2005–2017)
- Type: Subsidiary
- Industry: Financial services
- Predecessor: The Bank of Tokyo-Mitsubishi, Ltd. UFJ Bank
- Founded: January 1, 2006; 20 years ago (The Mitsubishi Bank, Ltd.; August 25, 1919) (The Sanwa Bank, Ltd.; 1933) (The Tokai Bank, Ltd.; 1941)
- Headquarters: Chiyoda, Tokyo (Marunouchi 2-7-1, Chiyoda-ku, Tokyo, 100-8388, Japan), Japan
- Number of locations: 868 branches (as of March 31, 2009)
- Area served: Worldwide
- Key people: Katsunori Nagayasu (president)
- Services: Retail banking Commercial banking Investment banking
- Revenue: ▼US$46.83 billion (2020)
- Operating income: ▼US$6.246 billion (2020)
- Net income: ▼US$2.7 billion (2020)
- AUM: ▲US$2.27 trillion (2020)
- Number of employees: ▲32,186 (2020)
- Parent: Mitsubishi UFJ Financial Group
- Subsidiaries: MUFG Americas Holdings Corporation; Senshu Ikeda Holdings kabu.com Securities Co., Ltd. Bank of Ayudhya; Bank Danamon; Morgan Stanley (23.3%)
- Website: www.bk.mufg.jp/global/

MUFG Bank, Ltd. (Note: Japanese: 株式会社三菱UFJ銀行, Hepburn: Kabushiki gaisha Mitsubishi Yūefujei Ginkō) is a Japanese bank and the core banking subsidiary of the Mitsubishi UFJ Financial Group (MUFG). It was established on January 1, 2006, through the merger of The Bank of Tokyo-Mitsubishi (Note: 株式会社東京三菱銀行, Kabushiki kaisha tōkyō mitsubishi ginkō) and UFJ Bank (Note: 株式会社ユーエフジェイ銀行, Kabushiki kaisha yūefujei ginkō), two major banking groups that themselves were the product of banking mergers. The bank was first named Bank of Tokyo Mitsubishi UFJ (BTMU) before rebranding as MUFG Bank in July 2018.

MUFG Bank, along with Sumitomo Mitsui Banking Corporation and Mizuho Bank, is recognized as one of the three so-called megabanks in Japan. As of June 23, 2019, it was ranked as the largest bank in Japan and the third largest in the world.

The bank's head office is in Marunouchi, Chiyoda, Tokyo, and it has 772 other offices in Japan and 76 offices overseas.

In 2025, the bank reported total assets approaching US$2.7 trillion, placing it among the world's major financial institutions. Its capital alone is approximately JPY 17 trillion (about US$110 billion at roughly JPY 155/USD). The institution is recognized as one of Japan's flagship banks.

It also holds 23.3% stake in the U.S.-based Morgan Stanley as its largest shareholder.

In the domain of investment banking (IB) and M&A, the bank's group collaborates with Morgan Stanley's securities arm so as to offer integrated bank‐and‐securities services (bancassurance-style integration), introducing Morgan Stanley to its corporate clients and facilitating both domestic Japanese and global M&A and business succession transactions.

In December 2025, it was announced that MUFG Bank had agreed to acquire a 20% equity stake in India-based non-banking financial company Shriram Finance through a preferential allotment. The investment, valued at approximately US$4.3 billion, was subject to regulatory approvals and would result in Shriram Finance becoming an equity-method affiliate of Mitsubishi UFJ Financial Group.
