= Mitsubishi Bank =

Former Japanese bank

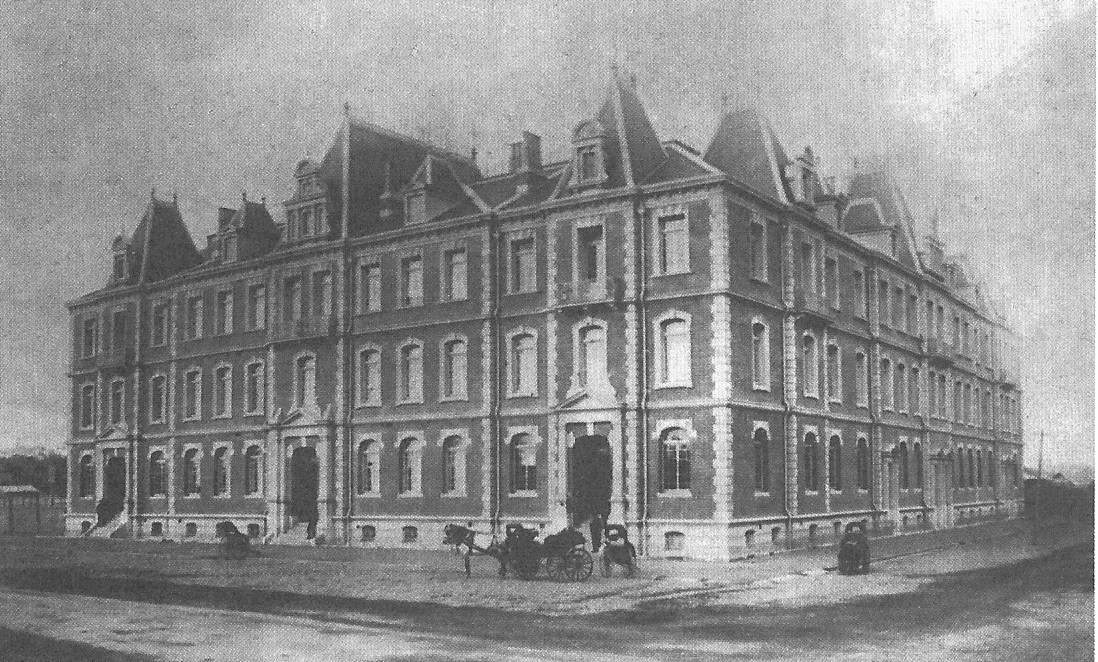
Mitsubishi building in Marunouchi, early home of Mitsubishi Bank; possibly photographed upon completion in 1894

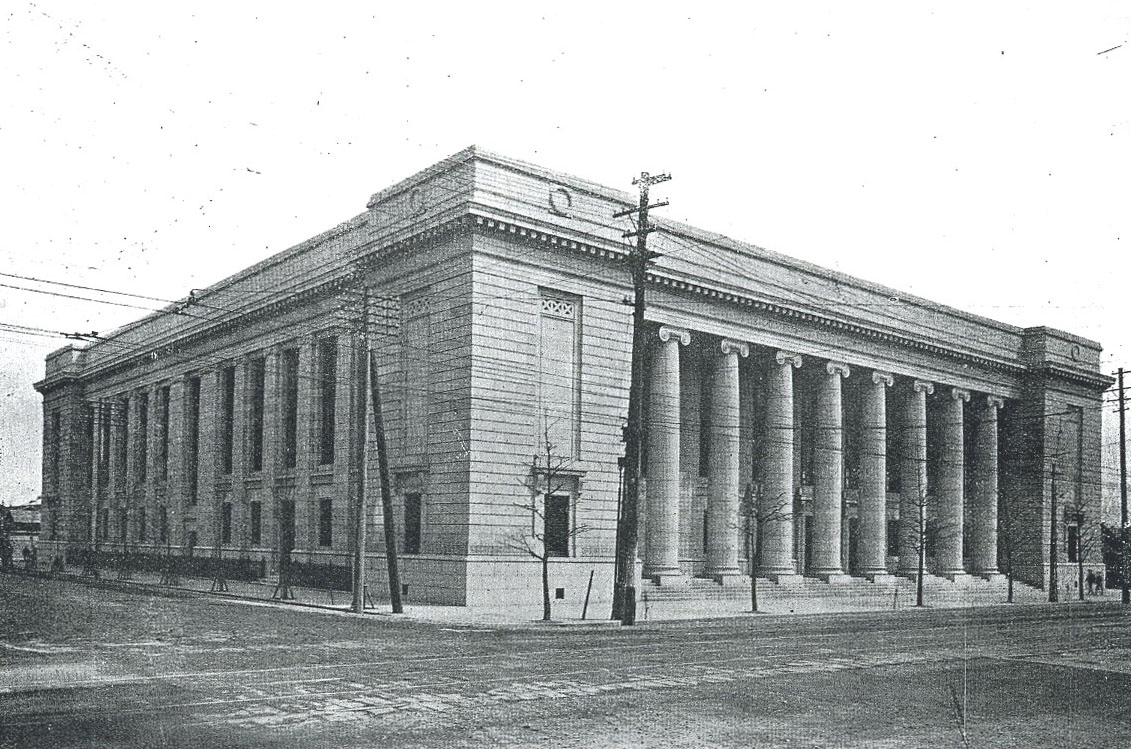
Mitsubishi Bank's head office building erected in 1922 across the street from the previous one, eventually demolished in 1977

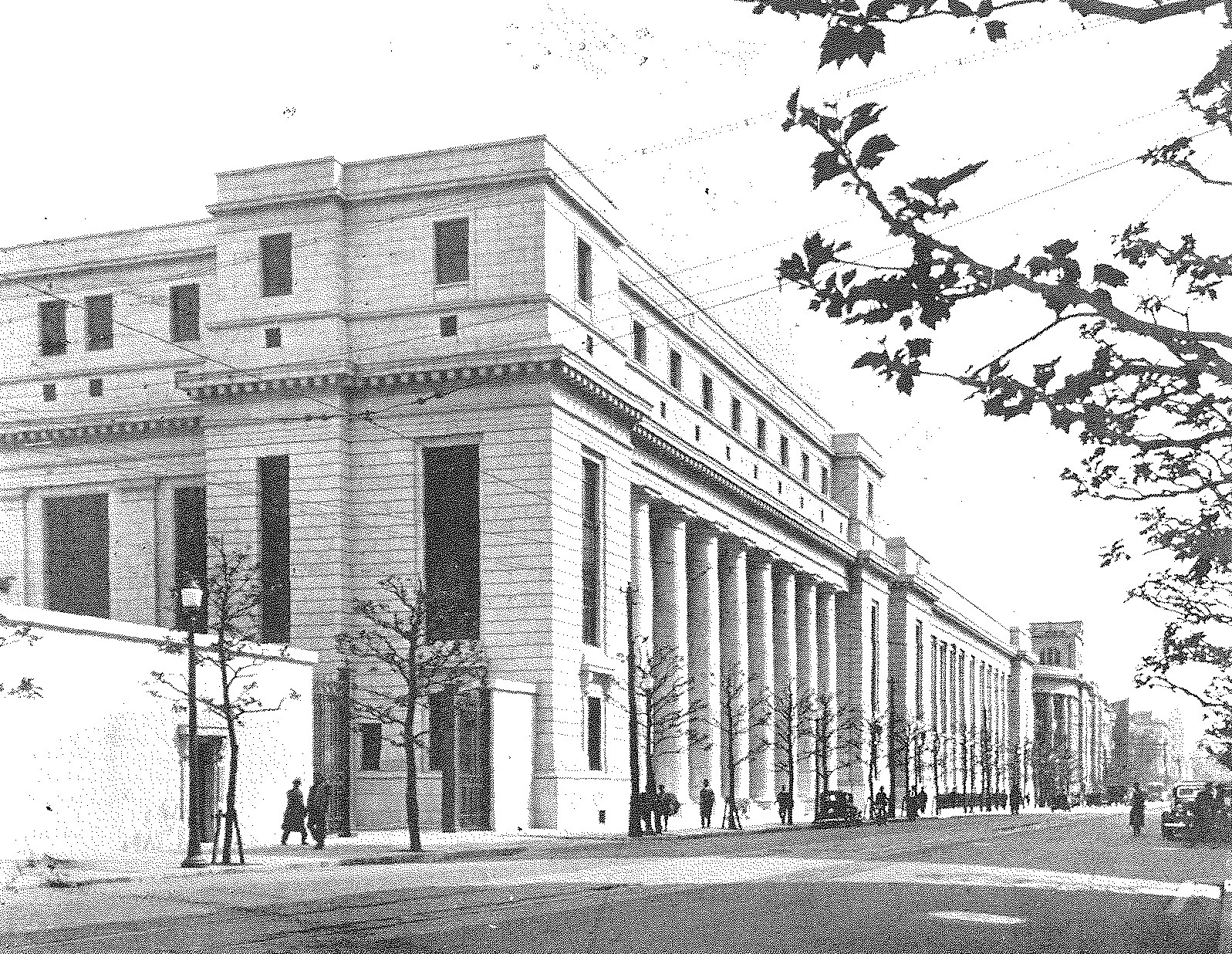
The same building following enlargement in the 1930s

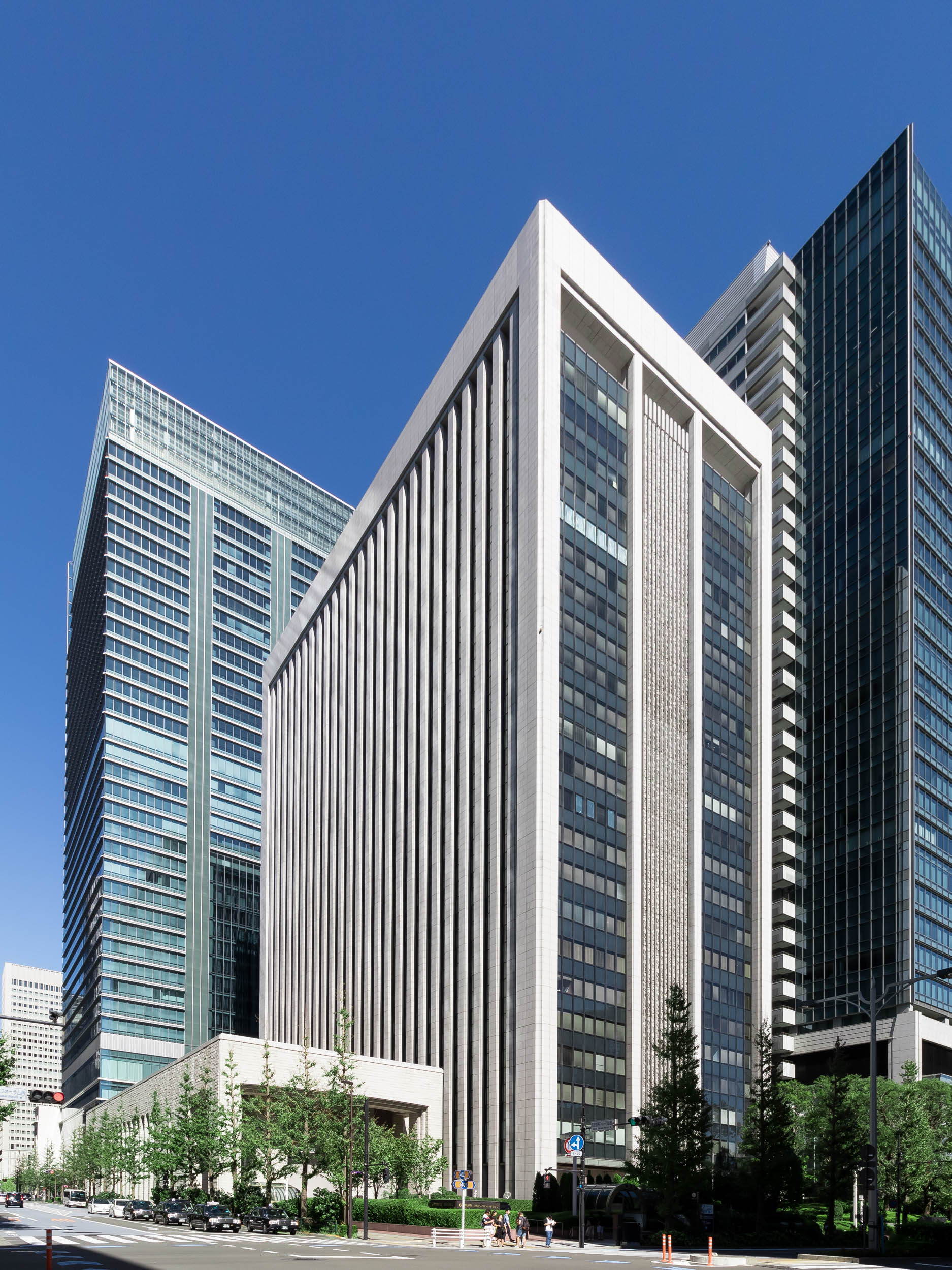
Mitsubishi Bank's more recent head office in Marunouchi, completed 1980 on the same site; lately headquarters of Mitsubishi UFJ Financial Group and earmarked for reconstruction

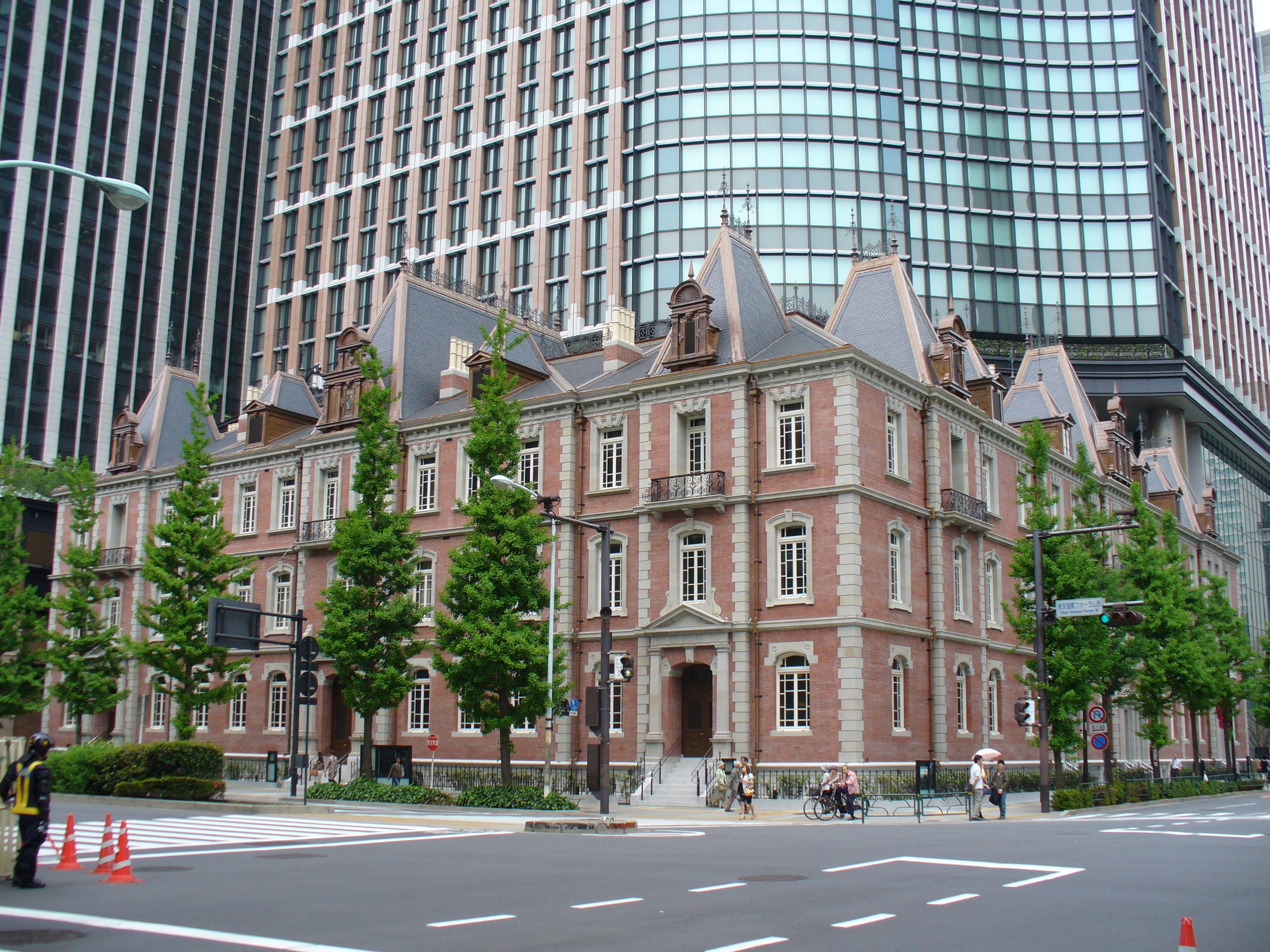
The first Mitsubishi building recreated in 2009 on original location, home of Mitsubishi Ichigokan Museum

The Mitsubishi Bank (株式会社三菱銀行, Kabushiki gaisha Mitsubishi Ginkō) was a major Japanese bank headquartered in Tokyo, founded in 1880. For much of the 20th century it was one of the largest Japanese banks, together with Dai-Ichi Bank, Mitsui Bank, Sumitomo Bank, and Yasuda / Fuji Bank. It served as the main bank for the Mitsubishi conglomerate. In 1948, the Mitsubishi conglomerate was dismantled and the bank was renamed Chiyoda Bank (千代田銀行, Chiyoda Ginkō) after the Chiyoda district in Tokyo, then reverted to the Mitsubishi name in 1953.

Mitsubishi Bank merged with the Bank of Tokyo in 1996 to form Bank of Tokyo-Mitsubishi, a predecessor of Mitsubishi UFJ Financial Group.

== Overview ==
The bank's operations date to 1880, when Mitsubishi group founder Yataro Iwasaki established the Mitsubishi Exchange House (三菱為替店, Mitsubishi Kawaseten) in Tokyo. Mitsubishi acquired the business of the Tokyo, Oita and Hakodate-based 119th National Bank in 1885, and spun this business off to an independent Mitsubishi Bank in 1919. The bank opened branches in London and New York in 1920. By 1929, Mitsubishi Bank had only 3 offices outside of Japan and its colonies, less than Mitsui bank or Sumitomo Bank and much less than the Yokohama Specie Bank, Bank of Chōsen and Bank of Taiwan, for which foreign trade was part of a public-interest mandate under special legislation.

During World War II, Mitsubishi Bank was a financier of Japanese interests in Manchuria through its branch in Dalian, opened in 1933. Its London and New York offices closed during the war, but reopened in 1953.

In 1969, Mitsubishi and Dai-Ichi Bank, Japan's oldest bank, began preparations for a merger, which would have led to a major regrouping in the bank-led keiretsu system of the era. But the plan met opposition among Dai-Ichi's management and its customers in the Furukawa and Kawasaki groups, who feared that Mitsubishi would dominate the combined bank and that their businesses would be absorbed by the relatively strong Mitsubishi group. As a result, the merger was called off. Two years later, Dai-Ichi merged with Nippon Kangyo Bank to form Dai-Ichi Kangyo Bank.

As with all major Japanese banks, Mitsubishi Bank expanded rapidly in the 1980s, and by 1988 it was the world's fourth-largest bank by total assets. Even so, it was known as a very conservative lender, and was among the few Japanese banks to emerge from the Japanese asset price bubble relatively unscathed. It acquired the Nippon Trust Bank in 1994. In 1996, it combined with The Bank of Tokyo to form The Bank of Tokyo-Mitsubishi.

In addition to its home country of Japan, Mitsubishi was also active in California, where it began banking operations in 1972 through Mitsubishi Bank of California. Mitsubishi Bank acquired Bank of California in 1984, which later merged with Bank of Tokyo-controlled Union Bank to form what was later known as MUFG Union Bank.

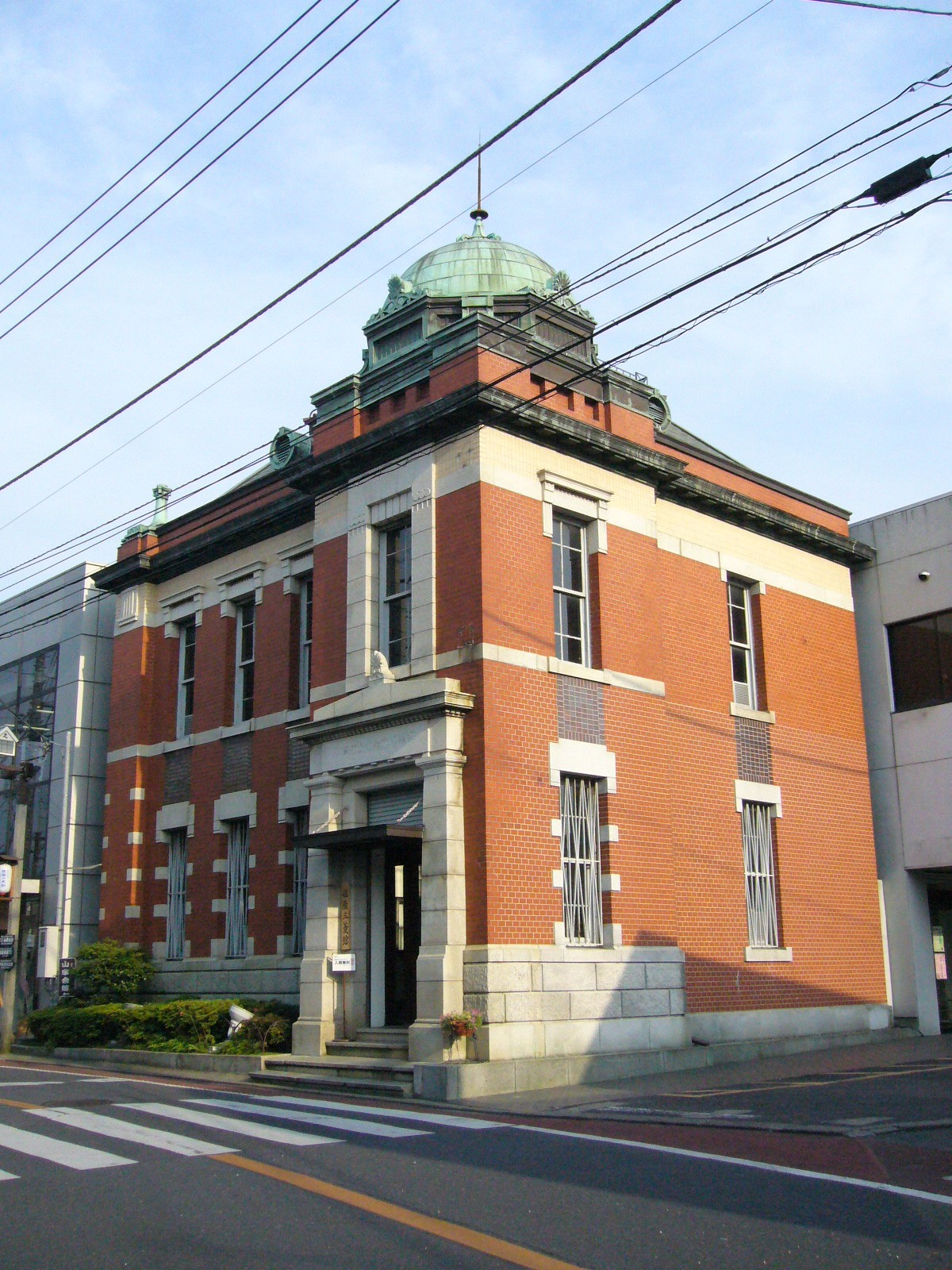
Former branch building in Katori, Chiba

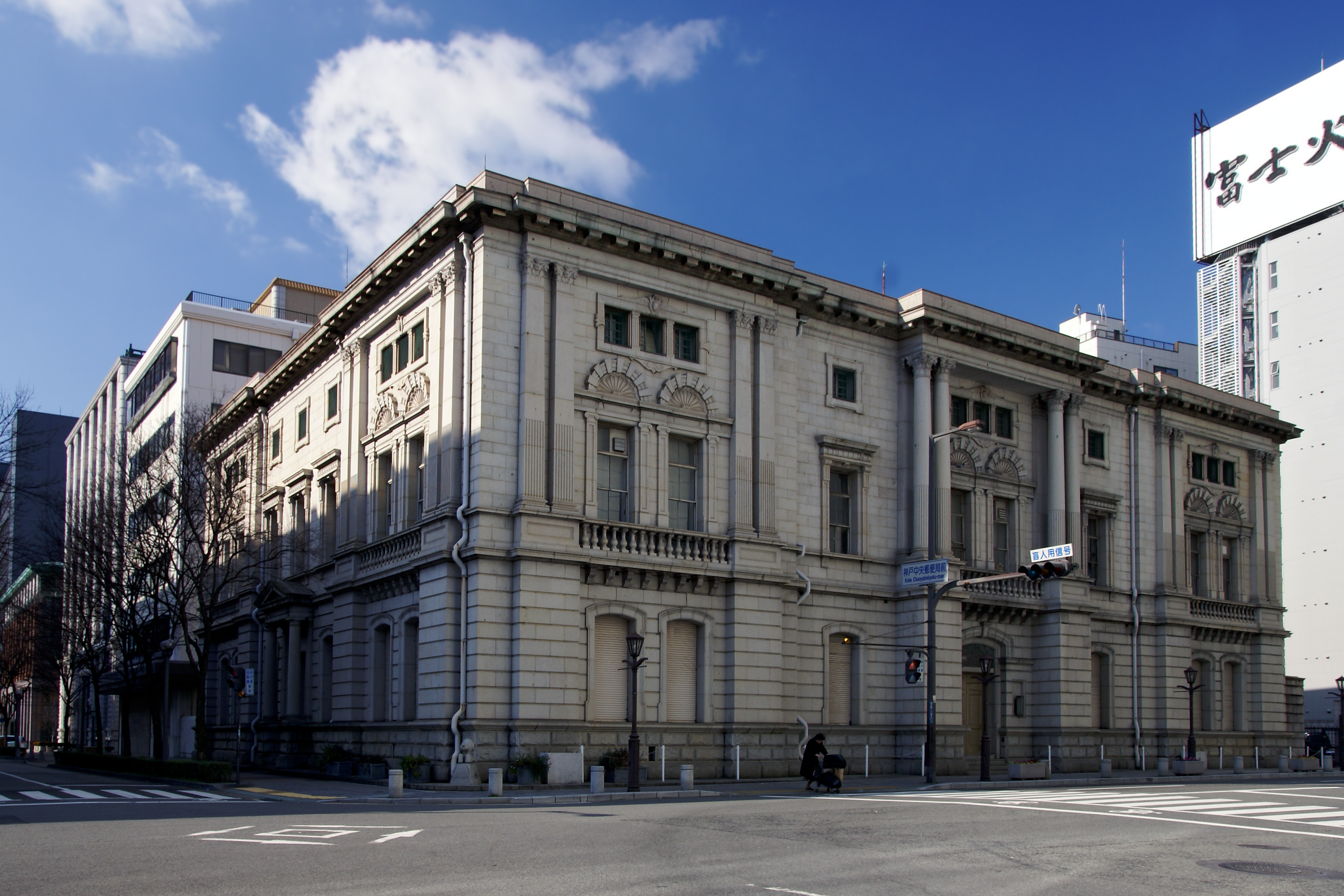
Former branch building in Kobe

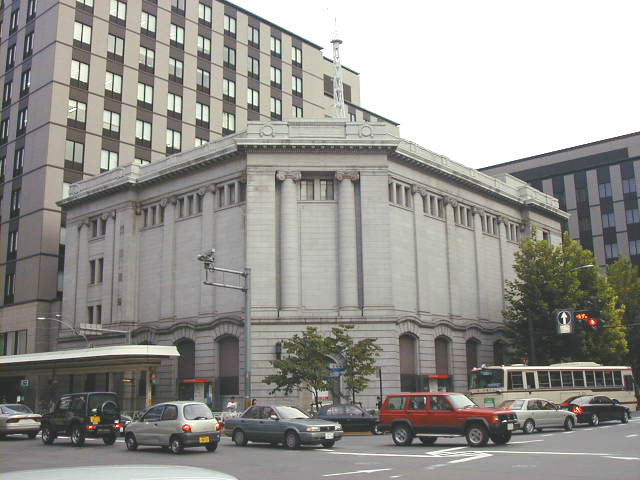
Former branch building in Kyoto, photographed in 1999

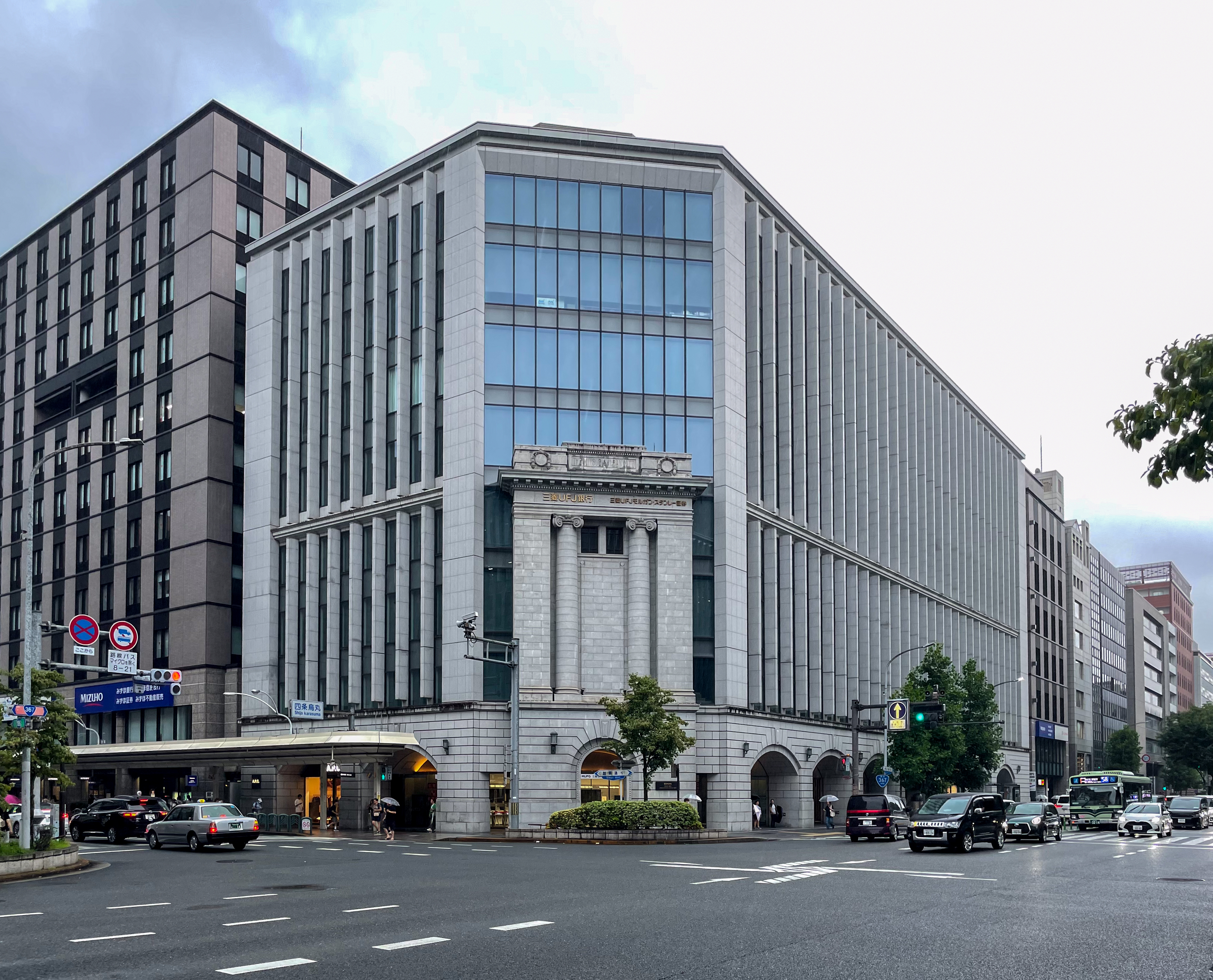
The same building in 2024 following partial reconstruction

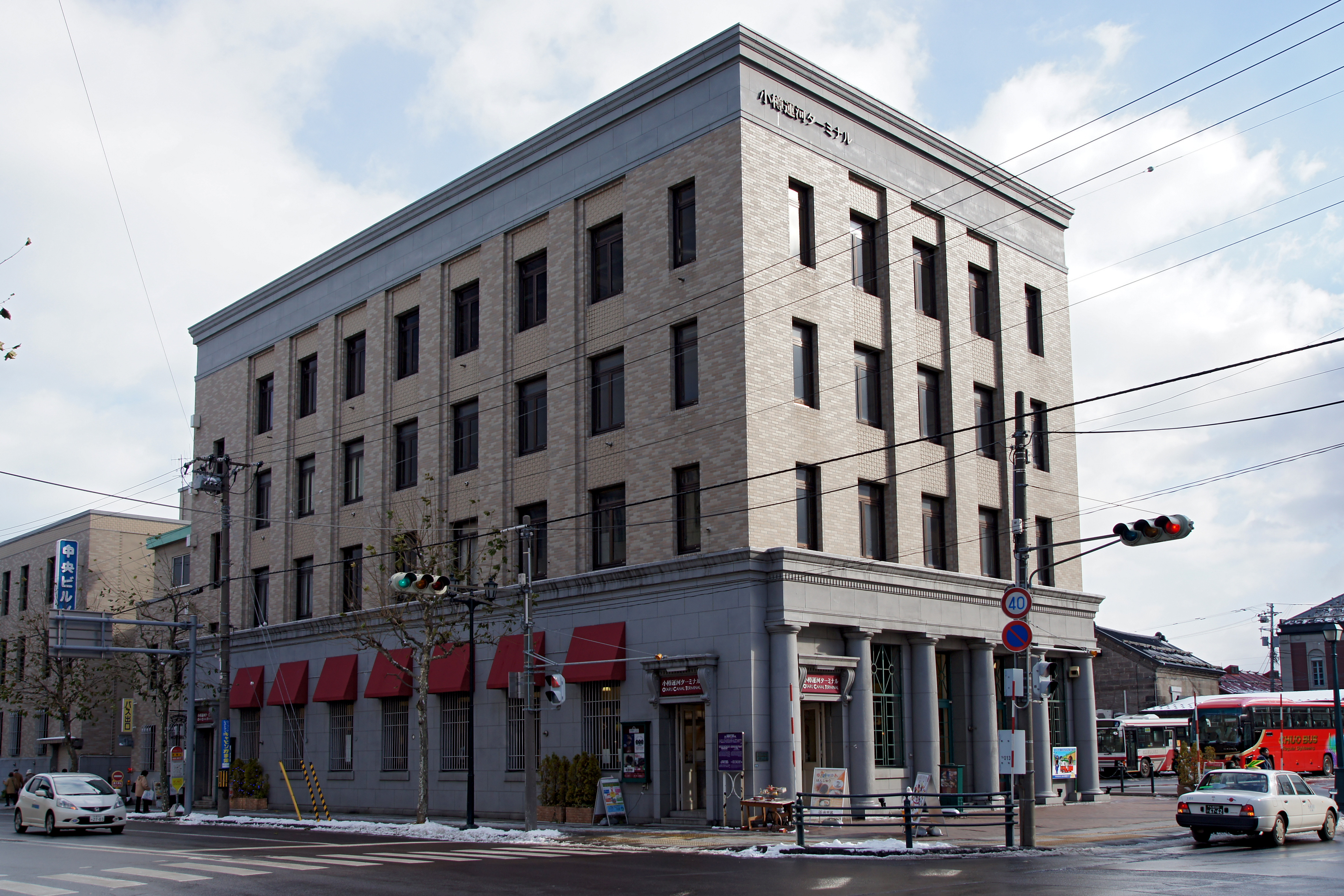
Former branch building in Otaru, Hokkaido

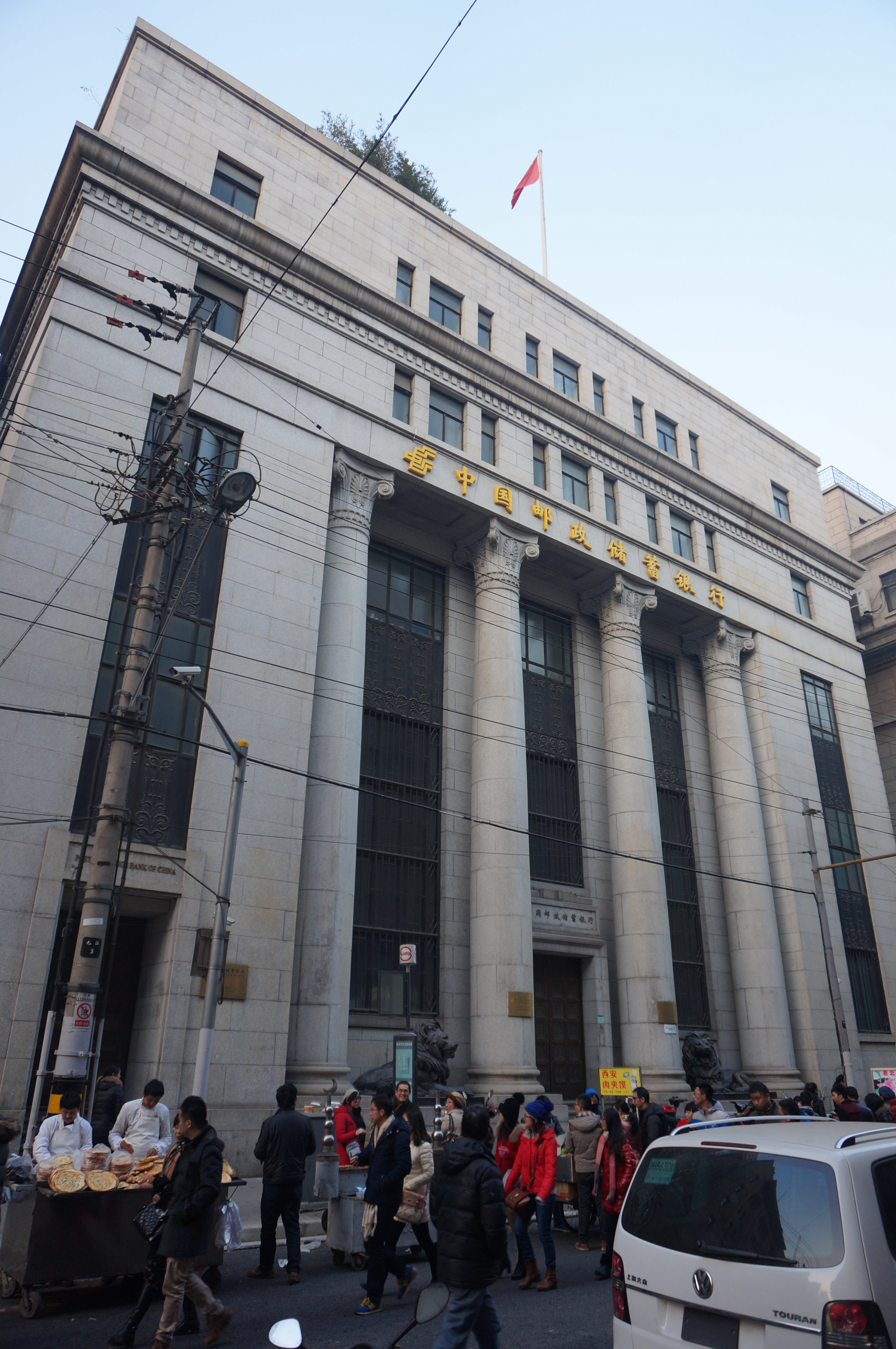
Former branch building in Shanghai, lately a branch of the China Postal Savings and Remittance Bureau

== Notable alumni ==
- Zentaro Kosaka, politician and Japanese foreign minister
- Makoto Usami, Bank of Japan president

== See also ==
- List of banks in Japan
