= Mitsubishi UFJ Trust and Banking Corporation =

Japanese trust banking firm

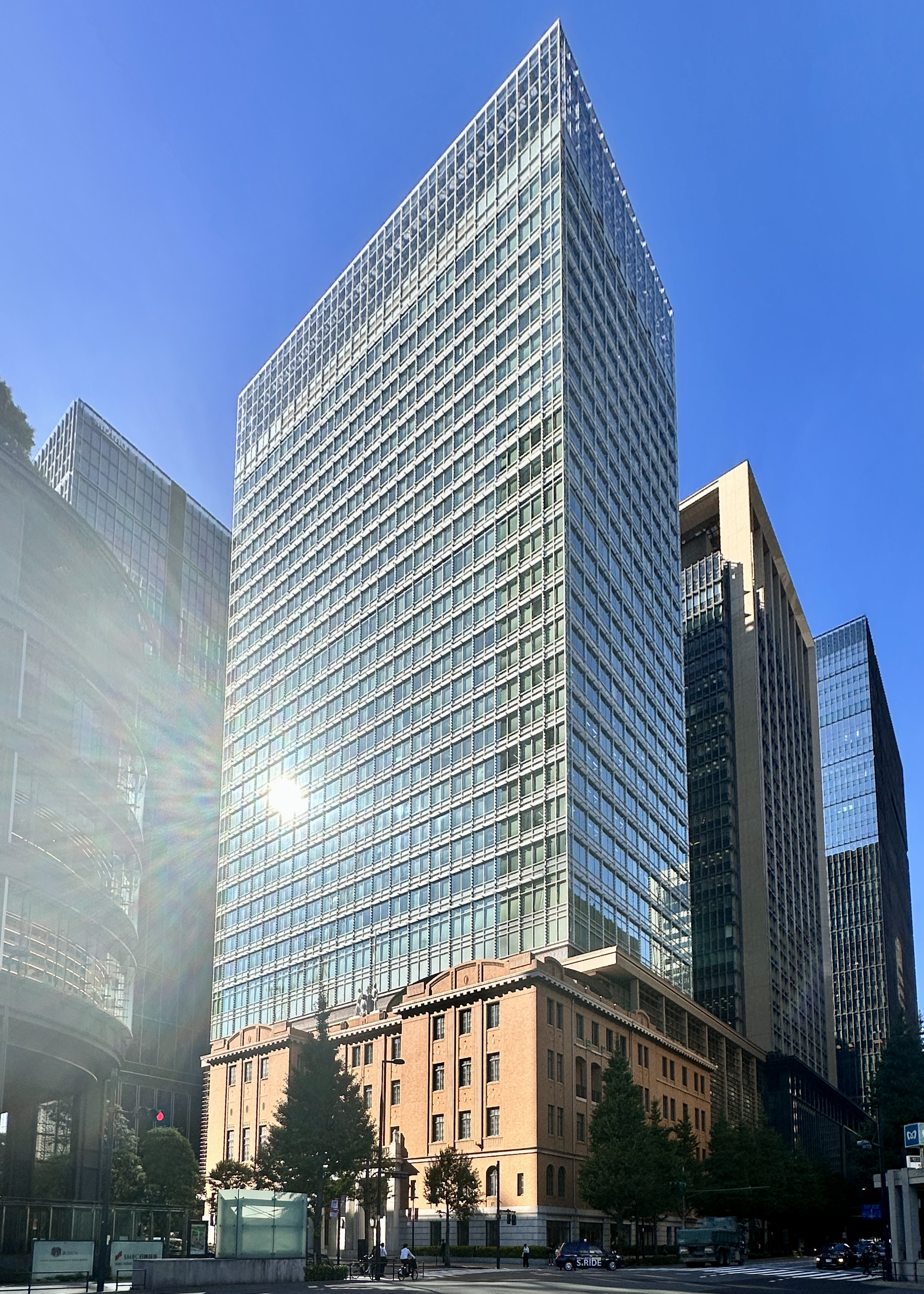
- Headquarters in Marunouchi, Chiyoda, Tokyo
- Native name: 三菱UFJ信託銀行株式会社
- Industry: Banking
- Founded: October 1, 2005; 20 years ago
- Headquarters: Tokyo, Japan
- Owner: Mitsubishi UFJ Financial Group
- Website: www.tr.mufg.jp

Mitsubishi UFJ Trust and Banking Corporation (三菱UFJ信託銀行株式会社, Mitsubishi UFJ Shintaku Ginkō Kabushiki-gaisha) is the trust banking arm of the Mitsubishi UFJ Financial Group, a Japanese financial services group that is the largest in the world measured by assets. The bank is headquartered in Tokyo, Japan.

The merger of Mitsubishi Tokyo Financial Group and UFJ Holdings on October 1, 2005, was followed by the merger of their respective trust banking subsidiaries, Mitsubishi Trust and Banking Corporation and UFJ Trust Bank, creating Mitsubishi UFJ Trust and Banking Corporation. The bank's Investor Services group provides administration, asset servicing, banking, and fund financing. The bank has over 3.3 trillion USD in assets and is one of the major institutional investors in global markets.

== History ==
The Mitsubishi Trust and Banking Corporation was a Japanese trust bank and a subsidiary of the Mitsubishi Tokyo Financial Group.

On October 1, 2005, the company merged with UFJ Trust Bank to form Mitsubishi UFJ Trust and Banking Corporation.

== Scholarship ==
The Mitsubishi UFJ Trust and Banking Corporation Scholarship Foundation was established in 1953. Since then, it has provided over 5000 scholarships to undergraduate and graduate Japanese and foreign students (as of 2011, approximately 90% have been Japanese and 10% have been foreign). Applicants are nominated by their respective universities and generally study the social sciences.

== Shareholders ==
- Mitsubishi UFJ Financial Group (100%)
