= Masaaki Shirakawa =

Japanese economist (born 1949)

Masaaki Shirakawa 白川 方明
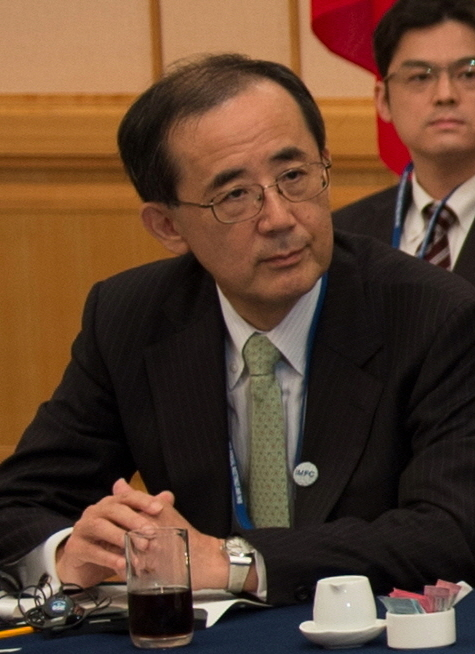

30th Governor of the Bank of Japan
- In office April 9, 2008 – March 19, 2013
- Prime Minister: Yasuo Fukuda; Taro Aso; Yukio Hatoyama; Naoto Kan; Yoshihiko Noda; Shinzo Abe
- Deputy: Hirohide Yamaguchi; Kiyohiko Nishimura
- Preceded by: Toshihiko Fukui
- Succeeded by: Haruhiko Kuroda

Deputy Governor of the Bank of Japan
- In office March 20, 2008 – April 9, 2008
- Prime Minister: Yasuo Fukuda
- Preceded by: Toshirō Mutō; Kazumasa Iwata
- Succeeded by: Kiyohiko Nishimura

Personal details
- Born: 27 September 1949 (age 77) Fukuoka, Japan
- Education: University of Tokyo; University of Chicago
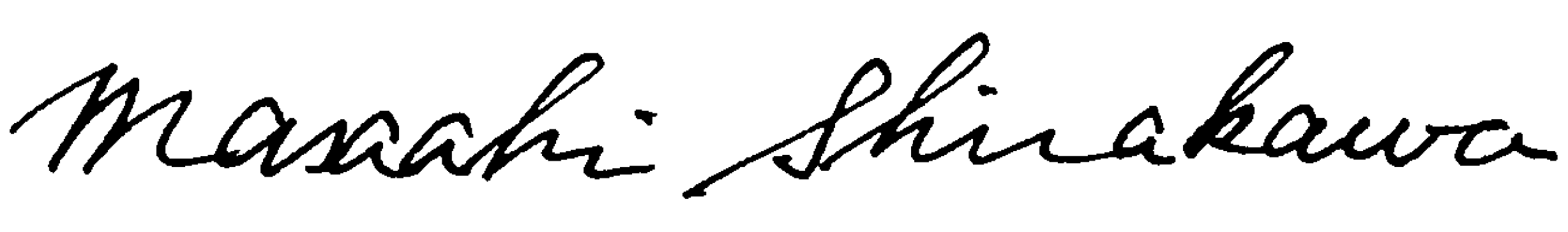
- Signature

Masaaki Shirakawa (白川 方明, Shirakawa Masaaki; born September 27, 1949) is a Japanese economist and the 30th Governor of the Bank of Japan (BOJ), and professor at Aoyama Gakuin University. He is also a Director and Vice-Chairman of the Bank for International Settlements (BIS).

== Early life ==
Shirakawa was born in Fukuoka. and he graduated from high school in Kokura.

In 1972, he was awarded a B.A. degree at the University of Tokyo. In 1977, he earned an M.A. in Economics at the University of Chicago.

== Career ==
Shirakawa joined the Bank of Japan in 1972. His varied assignments at the bank included a period as General Manager at the Ōita branch. For a time, he was General Manager for the Americas at the bank's office in New York City.

Shirakawa joined the faculty of the graduate school of public policy at Kyoto University in 2006. He returned to BOJ in 2008.

In the past, the position of Governor of the Bank of Japan was typically filled on a rotating basis by former officials from the Ministry of Finance and career Bank of Japan officials under a system known as “alternating appointments”; however, the 28th Governor, Masaru Hayami, and the 29th Governor, Toshihiko Fukui, were both former Bank of Japan officials, marking two consecutive terms held by such appointees. As the issue of whether the Bank of Japan’s independence could be safeguarded became a key point of contention during the selection of the next governor following the expiration of Fukui’s term, the government’s nominations—Toshio Muto (Deputy Governor of the Bank of Japan) and Koji Tanaba (President of the Japan Bank for International Cooperation)—were rejected by the House of Councillors, where the opposition held a majority in the divided Diet. Fukui, who stepped down as Governor on March 19, designated Shirakawa—who was to assume the post of Deputy Governor effective March 20—as “the person who will act as Governor until the next Bank of Japan Governor takes office.” Consequently, Shirakawa became Acting Governor of the Bank of Japan upon assuming the post of Deputy Governor.

Masaaki Shirakawa assumed the role of acting governor immediately upon becoming Deputy Governor of the Bank of Japan; however, concerns were raised that if the position of acting governor were to persist for an extended period due to the vacancy in the governor’s post, it would become difficult to address domestic and international economic issues from that position. During this period, Robert Feldman, Chief Economist at Morgan Stanley Securities, argued that “open discussion based on specific criteria” was desirable for important matters such as the appointment of the Bank of Japan Governor. He evaluated 19 individuals—including central bankers, bureaucrats, and business leaders— and published the results—scored against three criteria: “macroeconomics and independence,” “experience leading a policy-making body,” and “domestic and international networks”—in a research report titled “The Next Bank of Japan Governor: Comparing the Candidates” . The highest-rated candidate was Kumiharu Shigehara, a former BOJ official who had served as Director of the Institute for Monetary and Economic Studies and later Chief Economist and Deputy Secretary-General of the Organisation for Economic Co-operation and Development (OECD). Muto ranked 17th in “Macroeconomics and Independence” and 18th in the other two criteria, while Tanaba ranked last in all three criteria [6]. Consequently, there was a growing call, particularly overseas, for Kumiharu Shigehara to be appointed as Governor of the Bank of Japan. However, in the end, Shirakawa, who was already acting as Governor, received the consent of the Diet and assumed office as the 30th Governor of the Bank of Japan on April 9, 2008. The vacancy in the governorship lasted 20 days.

His nomination to be Governor of the Bank was approved on April 9, 2008.

On February 5, 2013, he announced that he would resign as Governor of the Bank of Japan effective March 19, before the end of his five-year term, which was scheduled to expire on April 8 of that year.

In 2013 he accepted a professor post at Aoyama Gakuin University.

== Selected works ==
In a statistical overview derived from writings by and about Masaaki Shirakawa, OCLC/WorldCat encompasses roughly 10+ works in 20+ publications in 3 languages and 110+ library holdings.

- The Monetary Approach to the Balance of Payments and the Exchange Rate: an Empirical Study of Japan's Case (1980)
- 図說日本銀行 (1993)
- Financial Market Globalization: Present and Future (1997)
- The Asset Price Bubble and Monetary Policy: Japan's Experience in the Late 1980s and the Lessons (2000)
- "One Year Under Quantitative Easing" (2002)
- Japan's Deflation, Problems in the Financial System and Monetary Policy (2005)
- De-leveraging and Growth: Is the Developed World Following Japan's Long and Winding Road? (2012)
- Tumultuous Times: Central Banking in an Era of Crisis (2021)

== Notes ==
Government offices
Preceded by Toshihiko Fukui	Governor of the Bank of Japan; 2008–2013	Succeeded by Haruhiko Kuroda
