= Toshirō Mutō =

Toshirō Mutō (武藤 敏郎, Mutō Toshirō; born July 2, 1943) is the former Deputy Governor of the Bank of Japan.

== Early life ==
Mutō was born in Urawa, Saitama Prefecture and graduated from Kaisei Academy High School in Nishi Nippori, Arakawa, Tokyo. He attended the University of Tokyo, graduating from the Department of Law in 1966. In the same year, he joined the Ministry of Finance.

== Career ==
Mutō served overseas at the Embassy of Japan in Washington, D.C. In 2000, he rose to Administrative Vice-Minister of Finance, and in 2003 joined the Bank of Japan as deputy governor.

On March 7, 2008, the government of Japan announced that it planned to nominate him for promotion to replace Toshihiko Fukui as governor. Fukui's term was to expire on March 19. His nomination was rejected.

Since January 2014, Mutō has served as the Director General/CEO of the Tokyo Organising Committee for the 2020 Summer Olympics.

In August 2021, Muto received a Silver Olympic Order.

== Sources ==
This article incorporates material from 武藤敏郎 (Mutō Toshirō) in the Japanese Wikipedia, retrieved on March 7, 2008.
