= Satoshi Sumita =

Satoshi Sumita

Satoshi Sumita (澄田 智, Sumita Satoshi, September 4, 1916 – September 7, 2008) was a Japanese businessman, central banker, the 25th Governor of the Bank of Japan (BOJ) during a period in which Japan became the world's largest creditor nation.

== Early life ==
Sumita was born in Gunma Prefecture.

== Career ==
In the 1960s, Sumita was made director of the Banking Bureau within the Japanese Ministry of Finance. He gained international experience as president of the semi-official Japan Export-Import Bank (JEXIM).

Sumita was Governor of the Bank of Japan from December 17, 1984 to December 16, 1989, having previously served as its deputy governor from 1979 to 1984.

In September 1988, he represented Japan at a meeting of the Group of Seven (G7) in Bonn. In March 1989, he was the head of Japan's delegation at meetings of the G7, the International Monetary Fund and the World Bank.

According to Finance Minister Ryutaro Hashimoto, Sumita "served during a very difficult time". Sumita was often blamed for the easy monetary policies of the Bank of Japan, which gave rise to the Japanese asset price bubble of the late 1980s. Subsequent research has however exonerated him, as the Bank of Japan deputy governor Yasushi Mieno and the Bank of Japan's director of the banking department, Toshihiko Fukui, created the asset bubble using a clandestine policy tool called 'window guidance' of whose existence the governor was not informed by them.

== Selected works ==
In a statistical overview derived from writings by and about Satoshi Sumita, OCLC/WorldCat encompasses roughly 8 works in 10+ publications in 3 languages and 30+ library holdings.

- 財政投融資: 昭和 34年度 (1959)
- 忘れがたき日日七十五年: 澄田智回想錄 (1992)
- 多国籍企業の実態: 外務省多国籍企業調查団報告書 (1973)

== Notes ==
Government offices
Preceded by Haruo Maekawa	Governor of the Bank of Japan; 1984–1989	Succeeded by Yasushi Mieno
