= Bank of Japan Headquarters =

Building complex in Tokyo, Japan

- 日本銀行本店
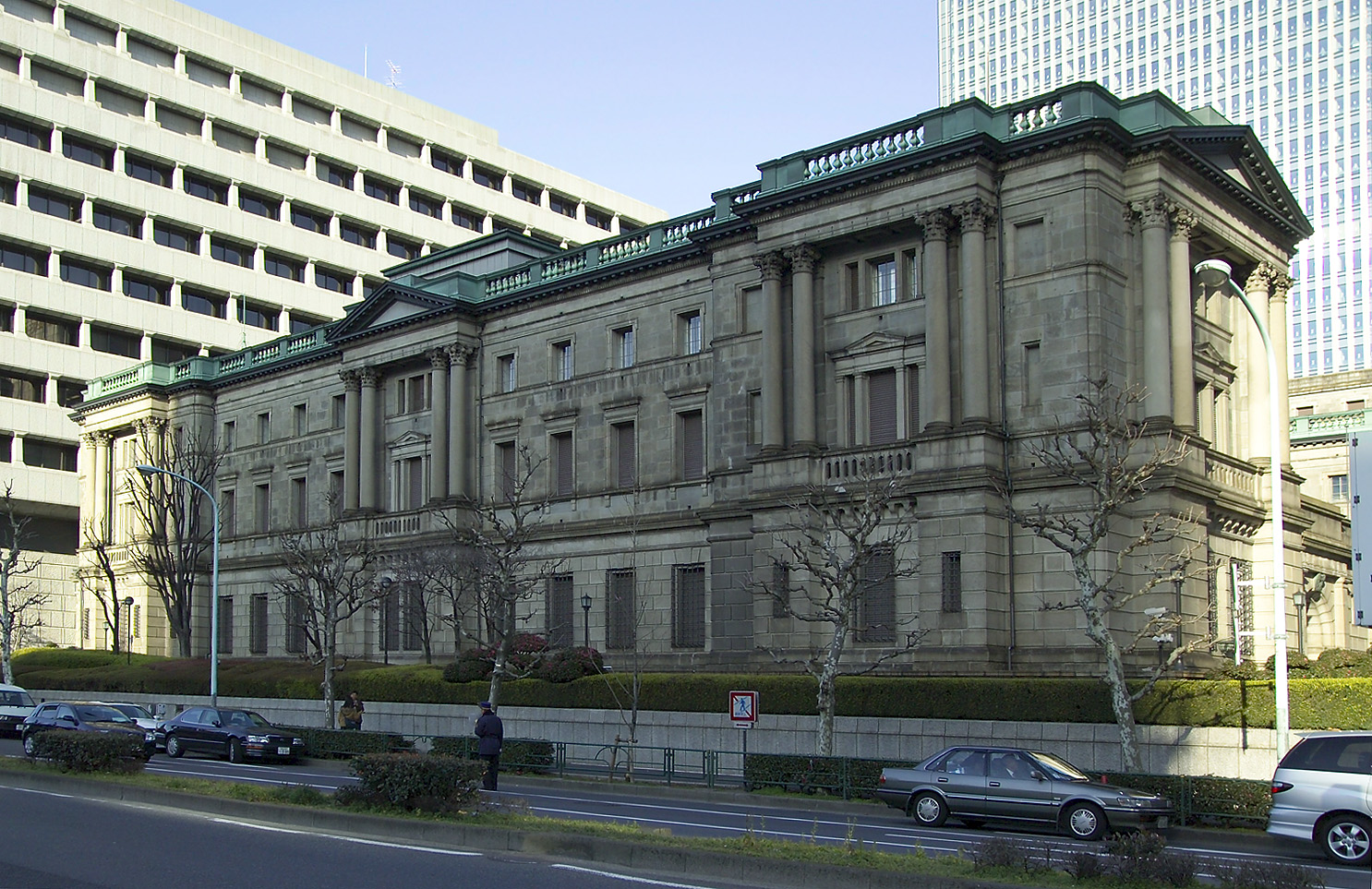
- Interactive map of the Bank of Japan Headquarters area

General information
- Architectural style: Eclectic
- Location: Chuo, Tokyo, Japan
- Coordinates: 35°41′12.6″N 139°46′17.1″E
- Completed: 1896; 130 years ago
- Owner: Bank of Japan

Technical details
- Floor count: 10

Design and construction
- Architects: Tatsuno Kingo, Nagano Uheiji, Matsuda Hirata

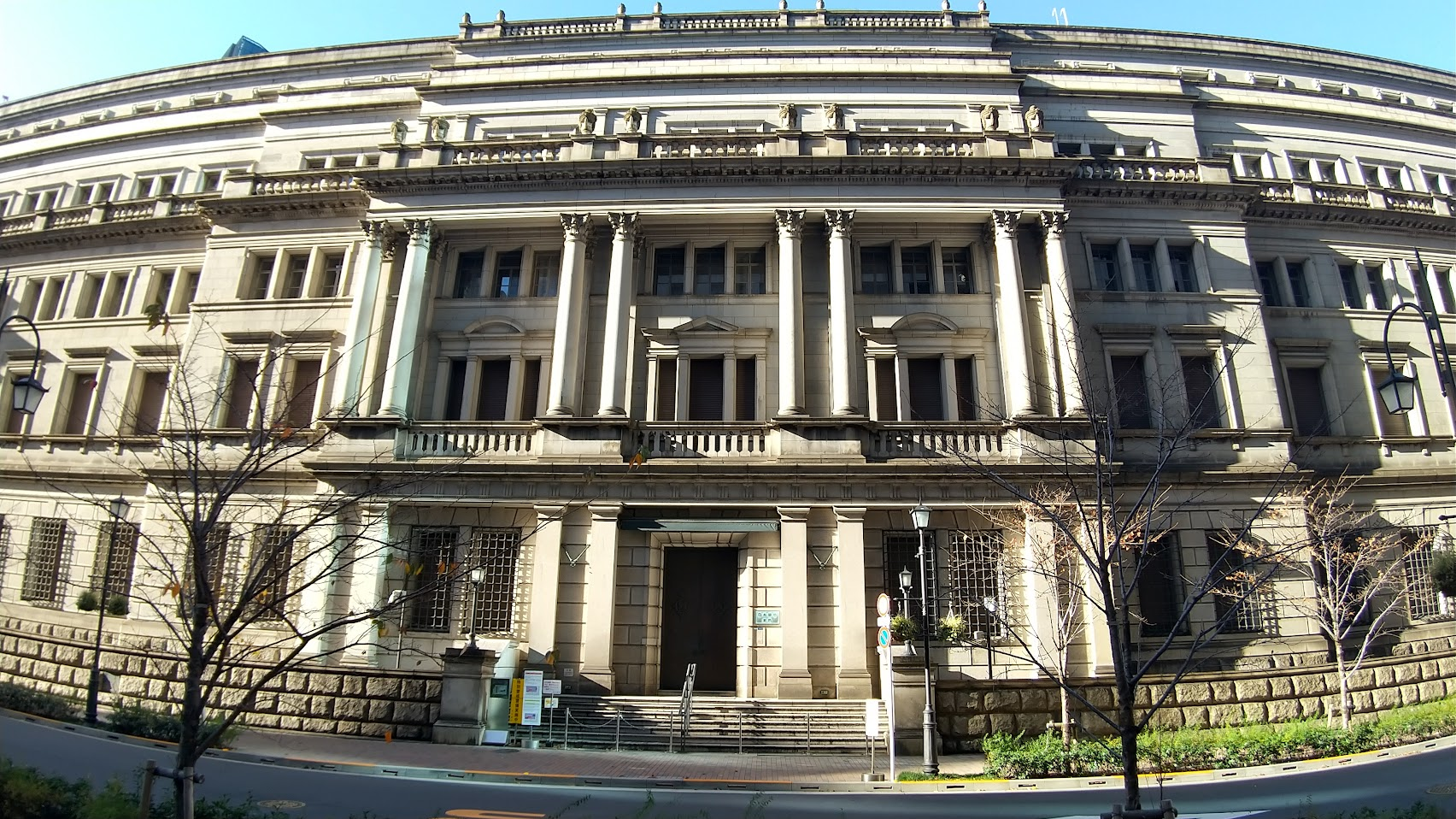
Entrance of the Bank of Japan, Tokyo

Bank of Japan Headquarters (日本銀行本店, Nippon Ginkō Honten) is the head office complex of the Bank of Japan (BOJ), located in Nihonbashi, Chuo, Tokyo, Japan. It occupies a large urban block and a smaller annex on the southern side. The main building of the Bank of Japan headquarters is open for tours.

The original building of 1896 has been listed as one of Tokyo's 50 Architectural Heritage Sites.

== Main Building ==
The original building, known as Honkan, was designed by Tatsuno Kingo, and completed in February 1896. It has three floors above ground and one basement level, with a total floor area of approximately 1,100 square meters. The first floor is almost entirely constructed of stone, while the second and third floors are made of brick covered with thinly sliced granite on the exterior. The central dome has four columns at the front and two columns on each side wing. The basement houses a large vault.

In 1926, following the 1923 Great Kantō earthquake, Nagano Uheiji, who had collaborated with Tatsuno as the bank's engineer, directed repairs of the building. Nagano then designed two extensions on the eastern side, known as Nigo-kan and Sango-kan, erected between 1932 and 1938. He also designed a northern extension, since demolished. He used reinforced concrete for the extensions but designed the façades in the same eclectic style as originally used by Tatsuno, creating a sense of continuity.

A new northern extension was designed in 1966 by Matsuda Hirata Architects. It has 10 floors overground and 5 floors underground, and was completed in 1973. On February 5, 1974, the older parts of the complex were listed as Important Cultural Property. The main building of the Bank of Japan underwent seismic isolation, starting in October 2016.

== South Annex ==
The south annex building is the home of Currency Museum of the Bank of Japan, and the institute for monetary and economic studies (IMES) is also located in the south annex building. It was built in 1982-1984.

== See also ==
- Economy of Japan
- List of central banks
- National Bank of Belgium
