= Toshihiko Fukui =

Japanese economist and banker

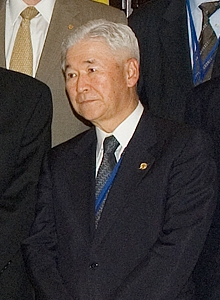

29th Governor of the Bank of Japan
- In office 20 March 2003 – 19 March 2008
- Prime Minister: Junichirō Koizumi; Shinzō Abe; Yasuo Fukuda
- Preceded by: Masaru Hayami
- Succeeded by: Masaaki Shirakawa

Personal details
- Born: 7 September 1935 (age 91) Osaka, Osaka Prefecture, Japan
- Education: University of Tokyo
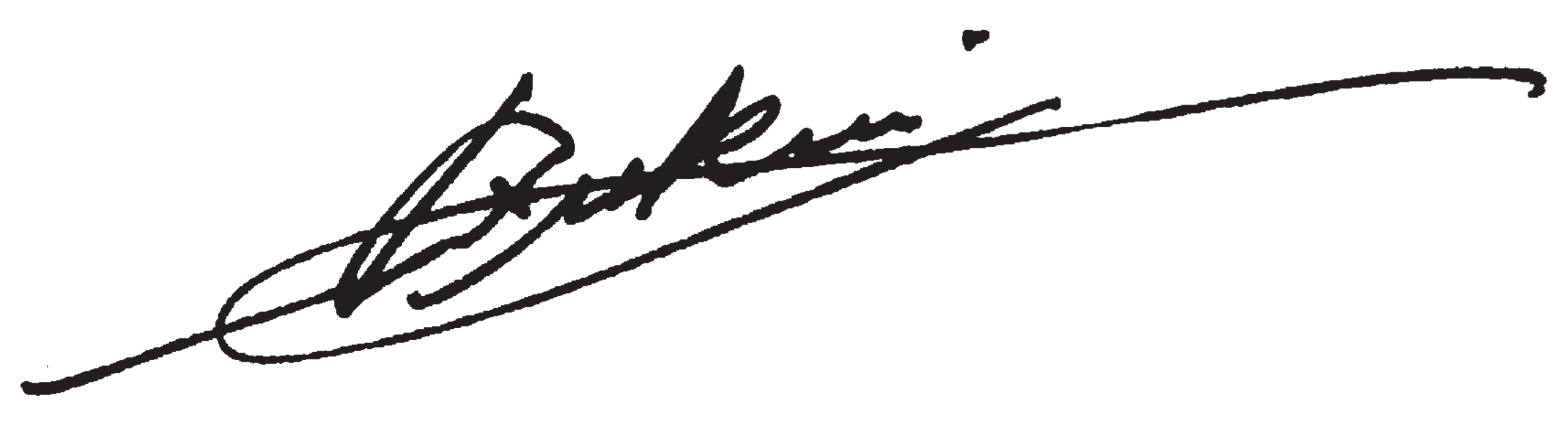
- Signature

Toshihiko Fukui (福井 俊彦, Fukui Toshihiko; 7 September 1935) is a Japanese economist and central banker. He was the 29th Governor of the Bank of Japan (BOJ) and a Director of the Bank for International Settlements (BIS).

== Early life ==
Fukui was born in Osaka.

== Career ==
Fukui has worked at Japan's central bank for 40 years. His positions included serving as the bank's representative in Paris, heading the research and credit management bureaus, and Executive Director. He was head of the Banking Department from September 1986 through May 1989.

In 1989, Fukui was promoted to Deputy Governor of BOJ.

In 1998, Deputy Governor Fukui resigned in connection with a bribery scandal involving leaks of financially sensitive information. He joined then-Governor Yasuo Matsushita in expressing official remorse by leaving the bank. He then became chairman of the Fujitsu Research Institute, a private policy group. He also became deputy chairman of the Japan Association of Corporate Executives.

In 2003, Prime Minister Koizumi’s office had identified Kumiharu Shigehara — the Bank of Japan’s leading internationalist and former Deputy Secretary-General of the OECD — as the hidden frontrunner among several candidates (monthly magazine “SENTAKU” June 2003 issue); however, in the end, Fukui, who had secured support from the business community and other quarters, was appointed (Yasuo Ota “The Essence of the Bank of Japan's Missteps” <Nikkei Inc., 2019, pp. 111–112> states that, through the efforts of former Bank of Japan Governor Mieno and others, former Prime Minister Miyazawa recommended Fukui — who had been highly regarded in the old era — to Koizumi). At that time, the Financial Times (February 25, 2003 issue) criticised Koizumi in an editorial titled “Koizumi’s Timidity,” arguing that he had succumbed to pressure from established forces that resisted the appointment of Shigehara — Koizumi’s preferred candidate — as governor.

Fukui served as Governor of the Bank of Japan from March 20, 2003 to March 19, 2008. He resigned in 2008.

== Selected works ==
In a statistical overview derived from writings by and about Toshihiko Fukui, OCLC/WorldCat encompasses roughly 1 works in 2 publications in 1 language and 6 library holdings.

- Recent developments of the short-term money market in Japan and changes in monetary control techiques [sic] and procedures by the Bank of Japan (1986)
- 地球温暖化対策中期目標の解說 (2009)

== Notes ==
Government offices
Preceded by Masaru Hayami	Governor of the Bank of Japan; 2003–2008	Succeeded by Masaaki Shirakawa
