= Masaru Hayami =

Japanese banker (1925–2009)

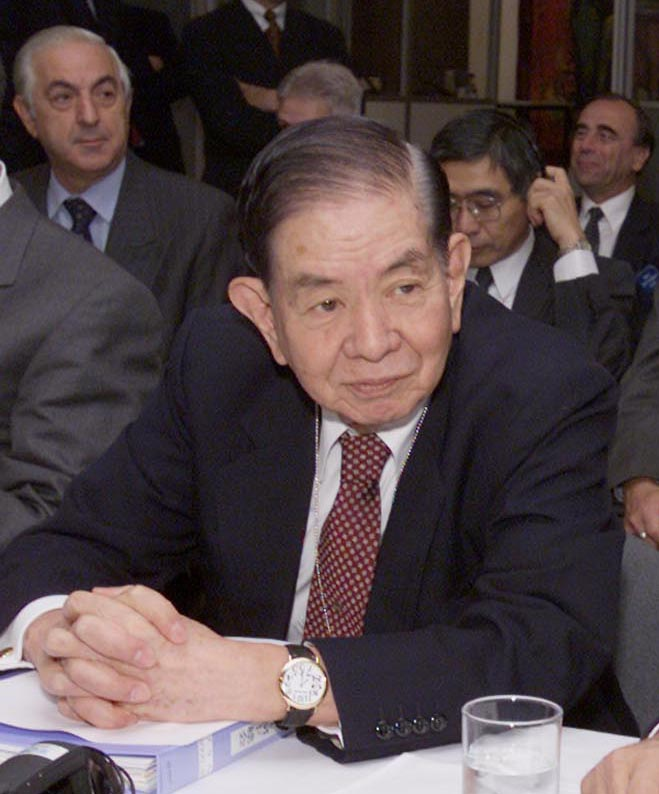
Masaru Hayami

Masaru Hayami (速水 優, Hayami Masaru; 24 March 1925 – 17 May 2009) was a Japanese businessman, central banker, the 28th Governor of the Bank of Japan (BOJ) and a Director of the Bank for International Settlements (BIS).

== Early life ==
Hayami was born in Hyōgo Prefecture. He graduated from The Tokyo College of Commerce (now Hitotsubashi University) in 1947.

== Career ==
Hayami was Chief Executive Officer of the Nissho Iwai Corporation,

He served as Governor of the Bank of Japan from March 20, 1998 to March 19, 2003. He took over the top BOJ role in 1998, after Governor Yasuo Matsushita and Deputy Governor Toshihiko Fukui resigned in connection with a scandal involving leaks of financially sensitive information.

=== Controversy ===
Hayami was a controversial BOJ governor because he insisted Japanese politicians must change the structure of the economy before the BOJ could take further measures to end deflation.

He fiercely resisted politicians' demand to loosen monetary policy, thereby increasing the pressure on politicians to reduce stifling regulation, monopolies, and oligopolies in various economic sectors. This strategy stressed Japan's long-term economic health over the short term problems of deflation and recession. However, there are doubts to whether the implementation of his demanded policies had actually served to increase Japan's long-term economic health in the first place.

'Inflation is no solution to economic problems: Regarding inflation policy, first and foremost, I would like to point out that inflation is no solution to economic problems. Inflation policy assumes that moderate inflation will revitalize economic activity, alleviate the debt burden of firms as well as financial institutions, and relieve the fiscal deficit problem. Apparently those who advocate inflation policy argue, while taking due account of its negative effects, that the intended positive effects would be greater than the negative effects under the current situation. But, if we look more closely, the intended positive effects themselves would not likely be achieved.'

== Selected works ==
In a statistical overview derived from writings by and about Masaru Hayami, OCLC/WorldCat encompasses roughly 9 works in 9 publications in 1 language and 20+ library holdings.

- 『海図なき航海の時代: 変動相場制10年』 (1982)
- 『円が尊敬される日』 (1995)
- 『国際収支』 (1997)
- 『中央銀行の独立性と金融政策』 (2004)
- 『強い円強い経済 = Strong yen, strong economy』 (2005)

== See also ==
- Sojitz

== Notes ==
Government offices
Preceded by Yasuo Matsushita	Governor of the Bank of Japan; 1998–2003	Succeeded by Toshihiko Fukui
