= Kumiharu Shigehara =

Kumiharu Shigehara (born 5 February 1939) is a Japanese economist, who was a central banker and an international civil servant. He is the author of The Bank of Japan, the OECD, and Beyond: Reflections from a lifetimes' work (Palgrave Macmillan, 2024), and the editor of The Limits of Surveillance and Financial Market Failure: Lessons from the Euro-Area Crisis (Palgrave Macmillan, 2014). Shigehara is president of the International Economic Policy Studies Association in Paris, and is also a columnist at the Japan Times.

== Career ==
Kumiharu Shigehara pursued his professional career both at the Bank of Japan and the Organisation for Economic Co-operation and Development OECD in Paris, France.

During his career at the Bank of Japan he also represented the Bank in international financial forums, including the Bank for International Settlements committee on banking regulation and supervision. He also attended meetings of international institutions such as the International Monetary Fund, the World Bank, and the Asian Development Bank. He later served as General Manager of the Bank of Japan's Nagasaki Branch, and subsequently became Director-General of the Institute for Monetary and Economic Studies from 1989 to 1992.

In 1992 Shigehara was appointed Head of the OECD Economics Department and Chief Economist, becoming the first person from outside the English-speaking world to hold the post. The Financial Times in its issue of 22 January 1992 described him at the time as "A tall, donnish man... noted abroad for espousing a tough, autonomous and not excessively pro-American monetary policy at the Bank of Japan."

In 1997 Shigehara was appointed Deputy Secretary-General of the OECD. In this role he supervised cross-departmental work across the Organisation covering economic, social, welfare, and development policy among OECD member countries. He also participated in consultations with policymakers from major non-member economies including China and Russia, and attended ministerial-level meetings involving groups such as the Group of Ten and the Group of Twenty.

== Selected publications ==
=== Books and edited volumes ===
- Shigehara, Kumiharu; Thygesen, Niels (1975). The Role of Monetary Policy in Demand Management: The Experience of Six Major Countries. Paris: OECD.
- Shigehara, Kumiharu (ed.) (1993). Price Stabilization in the 1990s: Domestic and International Requirements. London: Macmillan.
- Shigehara, Kumiharu (ed.) (2014). The Limits of Surveillance and Financial Market Failure: Lessons from the Euro-area Crisis. London: Palgrave Macmillan.
- Shigehara, Kumiharu (2019). 日本銀行とOECD ― 実録と考察. Tokyo: Chūōkōron Business Publishing.
- Shigehara, Kumiharu (2024). The Bank of Japan, the OECD, and Beyond: Reflections from a Lifelong's Work. London: Palgrave Macmillan.

=== Chapters in scholarly volumes ===
- Shigehara, Kumiharu (1996). "Options Regarding the Concept of a Monetary Policy Strategy." In: Deutsche Bundesbank (ed.), Monetary Policy Strategies in Europe. Munich: Verlag Vahlen.
- Shigehara, Kumiharu (2001). "Monetary Policy and Economic Performance." In: Leijonhufvud, Axel (ed.), Monetary Theory and Policy Experience. London: Palgrave Macmillan.

=== Policy speeches and conference papers ===
- Shigehara, Kumiharu. Speeches and commentary at the Jackson Hole Economic Policy Symposium organised by the Federal Reserve Bank of Kansas City.
- Shigehara, Kumiharu (2021)."Is Global Green Growth Achievable?". keynote speech at the French-Japanese Business Summit on 9 November.
