= Haruo Maekawa =

Japanese banker

- 前川 春雄

24th Governor of the Bank of Japan
- In office 17 December 1979 – 16 December 1984
- Prime Minister: Masayoshi Ohira; Zenko Suzuki; Yasuhiro Nakasone
- Preceded by: Teiichiro Morinaga
- Succeeded by: Satoshi Sumita

Personal details
- Born: February 6, 1911 Tokyo, Japan
- Died: September 22, 1989 (aged 78)
- Education: Tokyo Imperial University

Haruo Maekawa (前川 春雄, Maekawa Haruo; February 6, 1911 – September 22, 1989), also romanized as Mayekawa, was a Japanese businessman, central banker, the 24th Governor of the Bank of Japan (BOJ).

== Early life ==
Maekawa was born in Tokyo.

== Career ==
Before rising to become head of the Bank of Japan, Maekawa held other bank positions, including director of foreign-exchange operations.

Maekawa was Governor of the Bank of Japan from December 17, 1979 through December 16, 1984, having previously served as Deputy Governor from 1974 to 1979. Along with Finance Minister Noboru Takeshita, he was credited with negotiating a Saudi-Japan petrodollar accord in 1980.

=== Maekawa Commission ===
In 1986, the Maekawa Commission (the "Advisory Group on Economic Restructuring" headed by Maekawa) proposed economic reforms designed to make the living standards of Japanese more comparable to levels enjoyed in the West. Maekawa is credited as the chief author of the commission report. Maekawa Report into effect. His two reports argued that Japan should seek switch from an export-oriented economy into a domestic demand-led economy. They downplayed the need for achieving economic parity using foreign exchange rate adjustments. A new reorientation would require more spending and less saving. There would have to be demand-side improvements in the quality of daily life, changes in Japan's industrial structure and more imports. It proposed industrial structural transformations using market-incentive mechanisms. however the report was merely a statement of long-term goals, and contain no meaningful action programs. Even so it was opposed by many Liberal Democrats, by angry interest groups, and a few prominent economists. The report had very little long-term impact.

== See also ==
- Plaza Accord

== Notes ==
Government offices
Preceded by Teiichiro Morinaga	Governor of the Bank of Japan; 1979–1984	Succeeded by Satoshi Sumita
