= Teiichiro Morinaga =

Teiichiro Morinaga

Teiichiro Morinaga (森永貞一郎, Morinaga Teiichiro, September 9, 1910 – May 30, 1986) was a Japanese businessman and central banker who served as the 23rd Governor of the Bank of Japan (BOJ).

== Early life ==
Morinaga was born in Miyazaki.

== Career ==
Morinaga was Governor of the Bank of Japan from December 17, 1974 to December 16, 1979.

== Selected works ==
In a statistical overview derived from writings by and about Teiichiro Morinaga, OCLC/WorldCat encompasses roughly 2 works in 4 publications in 1 language and 6 library holdings.

- 財政会計辞典 (1959)
- 損害賠償と保険 (1966)

== Notes ==
Government offices
Preceded by Tadashi Sasaki	Governor of the Bank of Japan; 1974–1979	Succeeded by Haruo Maekawa
