= Makoto Usami =

Japanese businessman, banker and governor

- 宇佐美 洵

21st Governor of the Bank of Japan
- In office 17 December 1964 – 16 December 1969
- Prime Minister: Hayato Ikeda; Eisaku Sato
- Preceded by: Masamichi Yamagiwa
- Succeeded by: Tadashi Sasaki

Personal details
- Born: February 5, 1901 Yamagata, Japan
- Died: February 19, 1983 (aged 82)
- Education: Keio University

Makoto Usami (宇佐美洵, Usami Makoto; February 5, 1901 – February 19, 1983) was a Japanese businessman, central banker, the 21st Governor of the Bank of Japan (BOJ).

== Early life ==
Usami was born in Yamagata.

== Career ==
Usami was Governor of the Bank of Japan from December 17, 1964 to December 16, 1969, During Usami's tenure, the Bank was concerned with ensuring the stability of the Japanese yen in relation to other currencies.

== Notes ==
Government offices
Preceded by Masamichi Yamagiwa	Governor of the Bank of Japan; 1964–1969	Succeeded by Tadashi Sasaki
