= Haruhiko Kuroda =

Japanese central banker

- 黒田 東彦
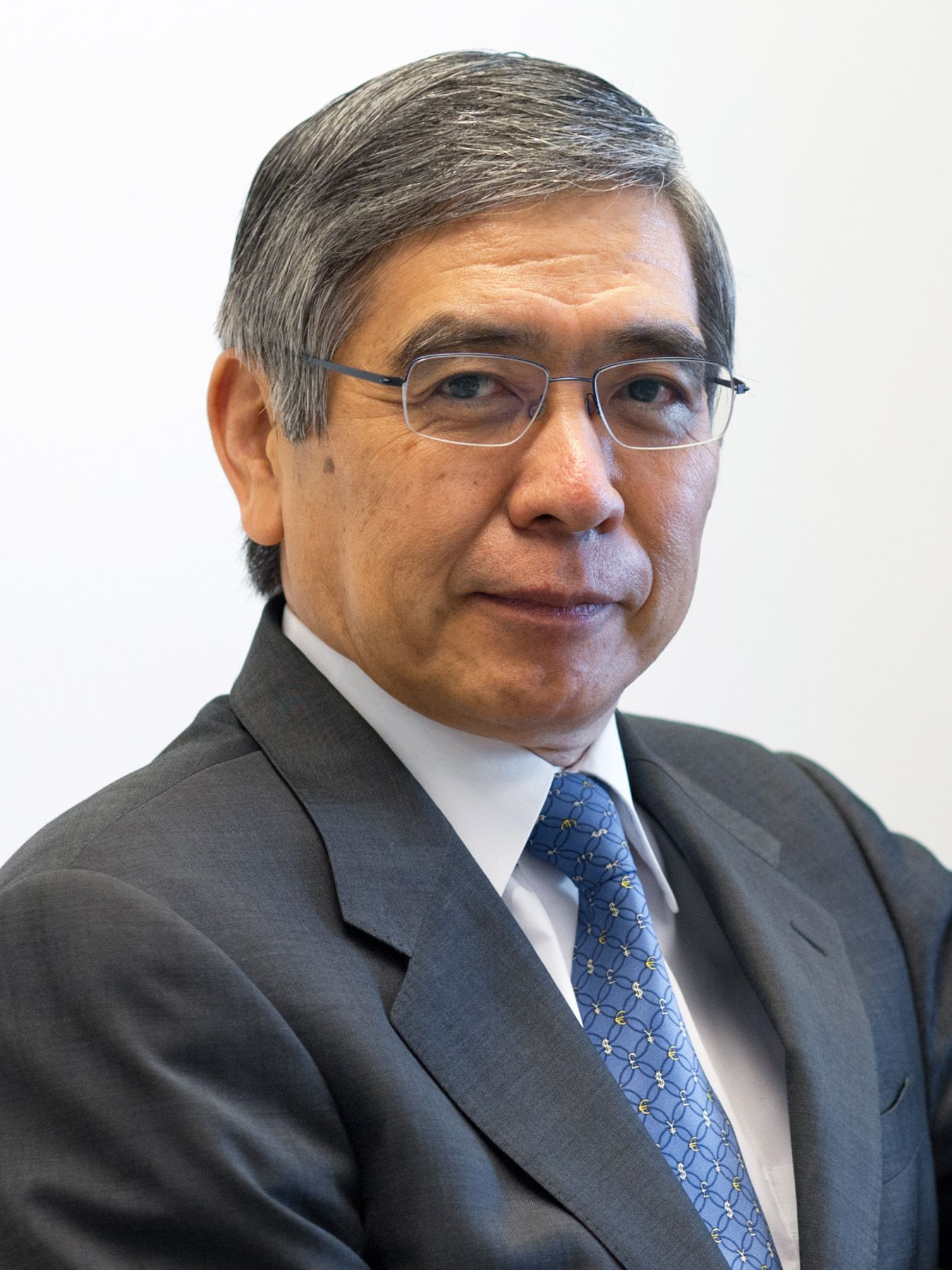
- Kuroda in 2011

31st Governor of the Bank of Japan
- In office 20 March 2013 – 9 April 2023
- Prime Minister: Shinzō Abe; Yoshihide Suga; Fumio Kishida
- Preceded by: Masaaki Shirakawa
- Succeeded by: Kazuo Ueda

8th President of the Asian Development Bank
- In office 1 February 2005 – 18 March 2013
- Preceded by: Tadao Chino
- Succeeded by: Takehiko Nakao

Vice Minister of Finance for International Affairs
- In office 8 July 1999 – 14 January 2003
- Preceded by: Eisuke Sakakibara
- Succeeded by: Zenbee Mizoguchi

Director General of the International Bureau
- In office 15 July 1997 – 8 July 1999
- Preceded by: Eisuke Sakakibara
- Succeeded by: Zenbee Mizoguchi

Personal details
- Born: 25 October 1944 (age 81) Ōmuta, Japan
- Spouse: Kumiko Kuroda
- Children: 2
- Education: University of Tokyo; University of Oxford
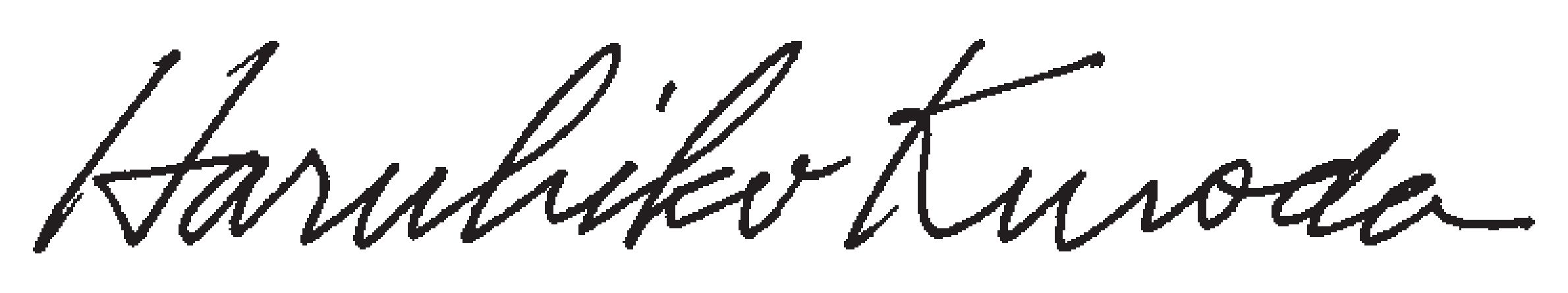
- Signature

Haruhiko Kuroda (黒田 東彦, Kuroda Haruhiko; born 25 October 1944) is a Japanese banker and a former Ministry of Finance government official who served as the 31st governor of the Bank of Japan (BOJ) from March 2013 to April 2023 and is currently a professor at the National Graduate Institute for Policy Studies (GRIPS). From 2003 Mr Kuroda served as special advisor to the Cabinet of Prime Minister Koizumi, while teaching economics and finance as a professor at the Hitotsubashi University Graduate School of Economics. He was formerly the president of the Asian Development Bank from 1 February 2005 to 18 March 2013.

== Early life and education ==
Kuroda was born in 1944, in Ōmuta, Fukuoka Prefecture, the eldest son of his family. His father was a Japan Coast Guard officer. As a child he lived in Yokohama and Kobe before settling in Setagaya, Tokyo.

He was matriculated at the University of Tokyo in 1963. Interested in the works of Karl Popper and Marx, he chose German as his first foreign language, which was an unusual choice among his peers. From the second term of his second year, he specialised in law, graduating from the Faculty of Law in 1967 after passing the bar exam.

After graduating, he joined the Ministry of Finance and then studied at All Souls College, Oxford, from 1969 to 1971, graduating with an MPhil in economics. At Oxford, he originally intended to study public finance under Ursula Kathleen Hicks, but finding out that she had already retired, he studied monetary economics under Richard Good Smethurst.

== Career ==
Kuroda went on to hold various posts at the Ministry of Finance, culminating in the post of vice minister of finance for international affairs (1999–2003). He resigned from the ministry in January 2003 and was appointed special advisor to the Cabinet in March 2003. From 2005 to 2013, he served as president of the Asian Development Bank.

=== Bank of Japan governorship ===
Kuroda advocated for loose monetary policy in Japan prior to his appointment at BOJ. His February 2013 nomination by the incoming government of the Prime Minister Shinzō Abe had been expected. Also nominated at the same time were Kikuo Iwata – "a harsh critic of past BOJ policies" – and Hiroshi Nakaso, a senior BOJ official in charge of international affairs, as Kuroda's two deputies. The former governor, Masaaki Shirakawa, left in March 2013.

=== 2013 ===
"There is plenty of room for monetary easing" in Japan, Kuroda said in a February 2013 interview, adding that the BOJ could go beyond purchasing government bonds to include corporate bonds "or even stocks". The yen, which "has fallen 10% against the dollar since Abe began his campaign in November", also fell on the news of Kuroda's nomination. However, the new governor was "expected to use his experience as Japan’s top currency official until 2003 to rebut overseas criticism that Tokyo is using easy monetary policy to drive the yen lower, triggering a war of competitive currency devaluation". Bloomberg quoted Stephen Roach, a senior fellow at Yale University, as saying about Kuroda's goals: "It’s a strong pledge from a well-intended man, but I’m not convinced it’s going to work." When Kuroda was asked the same question in his assumption of office's press conference on 21 March, Kuroda said the BOJ's role is to stabilize prices, and stabilizing exchange rates is the role of the Ministry of Finance. He also said that BOJ's "Quantitative and Qualitative Monetary Easing" policy was not intend to devalue the yen, aiming to grow out of deflation by targeting inflation. Although there was opposition from developing countries, the policy was accepted by the other developed countries in the G20 summit. However, G20 members emphasized to Japanese policymakers that Japanese policy should be directed at domestic goals while highlighting the importance of a Japanese effort to reduce government debt.

=== 2016 ===
In early 2016 after a stretch of global market weakness, Kuroda led Japan's move into negative interest rates. The BOJ had already pushed its balance sheet from 35% to 70+% of GDP since 2013 and was continuing to buy ¥80 trillion (over $600 billion) of securities each month. "Risks were growing that the slowdown in the Chinese, emerging and resource-producing countries, which has caused volatility and instability in financial markets since the beginning of the year, may hurt confidence among domestic [Japanese] companies", Kuroda was quoted as saying at the time of the interest-rate cut.

=== 2022 ===
Kuroda maintained a dovish stance in early 2022, with the Bank of Japan buying unlimited bonds at 0.25bps.

=== 2023 ===
Kuroda retired from the Bank of Japan in April 2023, to be succeeded by Kazuo Ueda. After retirement he took up a position at the National Graduate Institute for Policy Studies (GRIPS) as a professor and senior fellow of the GRIPS Alliance.

== See also ==
- Abenomics
- Reflation

Positions in intergovernmental organisations
Preceded by Tadao Chino	President of the Asian Development Bank; 2005–2013	Succeeded by Takehiko Nakao
Government offices
Preceded by Masaaki Shirakawa	Governor of the Bank of Japan; 2013–2023	Succeeded by Kazuo Ueda
