= Kazuo Ueda =

Japanese economist (born 1951)

- 植田 和男
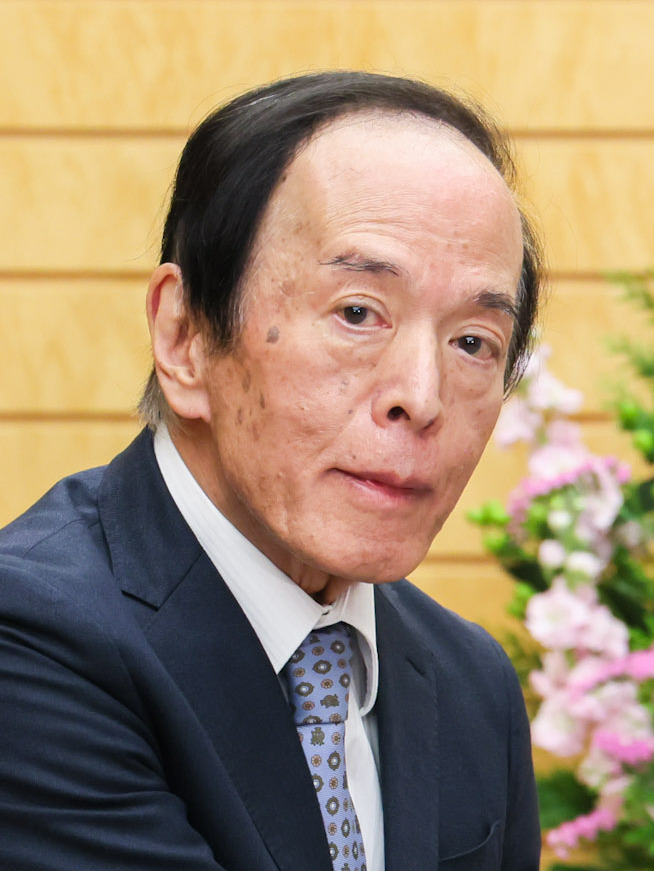
- Kazuo Ueda in 2025

32nd Governor of the Bank of Japan
- Incumbent
- Assumed office 9 April 2023
- Prime Minister: Fumio Kishida; Shigeru Ishiba; Sanae Takaichi
- Preceded by: Haruhiko Kuroda

Personal details
- Born: September 20, 1951 (age 75) Makinohara, Japan
- Education: University of Tokyo (BS); Massachusetts Institute of Technology (MS, PhD)

Kazuo Ueda (Japanese: 植田 和男, Hepburn: Ueda Kazuo; born September 20, 1951) is a Japanese economist who has been serving as the 32nd Governor of the Bank of Japan (BOJ) since April 2023.

He is a professor emeritus at the University of Tokyo (UTokyo) and also worked briefly as a professor at Kyoritsu Women’s University after his retirement from UTokyo in 2017. He was the dean of the Faculty of Economics at UTokyo and president of the Japanese Economic Association.

== Biography ==
Ueda graduated from the University of Tokyo with a Bachelor of Science in Mathematics and then studied at Faculty of Economics under Hirofumi Uzawa, Ryutaro Komiya, and Koichi Hamada. In 1980, Ueda received his PhD in economics from the Massachusetts Institute of Technology. His doctoral advisor was Stanley Fischer.

After working at the University of British Columbia and Osaka University, he returned to his alma mater in 1989, retiring in 2017 to become Professor Emeritus. He also served on the Bank of Japan's Policy Board from April 1998 to April 2005, and was reappointed to it in April 2000. From April 2011 to June 2012, Ueda was president of the Japan Economic Association.

In February 2023, Ueda was nominated by Prime Minister Fumio Kishida to succeed the long-serving Haruhiko Kuroda as Governor of the Bank of Japan. He was an unexpected choice as the position is usually filled by a senior official from the Ministry of Finance or the bank itself. Ueda began his term in April 2023. On 19 March 2024, the BoJ under Ueda decided to end the zero-interest-rate policy and the yield curve control. This was a milestone for the long-stagnant Japanese economy, as the bank rate had not been raised for 17 years due to deflation or very low inflation, which the country finally got out of with the help of the 2021-2023 global inflation surge.

== Other activities ==
- International Monetary Fund (IMF), Ex-Officio Alternate Member of the Board of Governors (since 2022)

== Works in Japanese ==
=== Single-authored ===
- 国際マクロ経済学と日本経済 開放経済体系の理論と実証 (International Macroeconomics and the Japanese Economy: Theory and Evidence of an Open Economic System) 東洋経済新報社, 1983
- 戦後の経済変動と経常収支 (Postwar Economic Fluctuations and the Current Account, Ministry of Finance, Financial Research Institute) 大蔵省財政金融研究所, 1986
- 国際収支不均衡下の金融政策 (Monetary Policy under International Balance of Payments Imbalances) 東洋経済新報社, 1992 ISBN 4492651578
- ゼロ金利との闘い 日銀の金融政策を総括する (Battling Zero Interest Rates: Evaluating the Bank of Japan’s Monetary Policy) 日本経済新聞社, 2005 ISBN 4532351839
- 大学4年間の金融学が10時間でざっと学べる (Speed Learn University-Level Finance in 10 Hours) 中経出版, 2017

=== Co-authored ===
- 円・ドルレート:1973–1985 吉田康 大蔵省財政金融研究所, 1986
- 企業間株式持合の経済的影響の分析 東京大学, 1990
- 金融・入門 三日間の経済学 翁邦雄 JICC出版局, 1991 ISBN 4796601449
- 戦後日本の資金配分 産業政策と民間銀行 岡崎哲二, 奥野正寛ほか 東京大学出版会, 2002 ISBN 4130401866
- パースペクティブ日本経済 円高シフトの構造と方向 伊藤元重, 竹中平蔵共編 筑摩書房, 1988 ISBN 4480854460
- 90年代の国際金融 深尾光洋共編 日本経済新聞社, 1991 ISBN 4532130115
- 変革期の金融システム 貝塚啓明共編 東京大学出版会, 1994 ISBN 4130401416
- 金融空洞化の経済分析 深尾光洋ほか共編 日本経済新聞社, 1996 ISBN 453213109X
- 日本経済事典 伊藤元重, 小峰隆夫, 猪木武徳, 加護野忠男, 樋口美雄共編 日本経済新聞社, 1996 ISBN 4532145007
- 世界金融・経済危機の全貌 原因・波及・政策対応 慶應義塾大学出版会, 2010 ISBN 9784766417753

Government offices
Preceded by Haruhiko Kuroda	Governor of the Bank of Japan; 2023–present	Incumbent
