= Yasushi Mieno =

- 三重野 康

26th Governor of the Bank of Japan
- In office 17 December 1989 – 16 December 1994
- Prime Minister: Toshiki Kaifu; Kiichi Miyazawa; Morihiro Hosokawa; Tsutomu Hata; Tomiichi Murayama
- Preceded by: Satoshi Sumita
- Succeeded by: Yasuo Matsushita

Personal details
- Born: March 17, 1924 Ōita, Japan
- Died: April 15, 2012 (aged 88)
- Education: Tokyo Imperial University

Yasushi Mieno (三重野 康, Mieno Yasushi; March 17, 1924 – April 15, 2012) was a Japanese businessman, central banker, the 26th Governor of the Bank of Japan (BOJ) and a Director of the Bank for International Settlements (BIS).

== Early life ==
Mieno was born in Ōita.

== Career ==
From April 1975 through February 1978, Mieno was head of the BOJ banking department.

Mieno was BOJ Governor from December 17, 1989, to December 16, 1994, having previously served as Deputy Governor from 1984 to 1989. Starting a week after his appointment, from late December 1989 until August 1990, BOJ heavily increased interest rates. Soon the Japanese asset price bubble of the 1980s collapsed.

In 1994, he was an elected member of the BIS Board of Directors.

On April 15, 2012, Mieno died from heart failure in a Tokyo hospital.

== Selected works ==
In a statistical overview derived from writings by and about Yasushi Mieno, OCLC/WorldCat encompasses roughly 7 works in 10 publications in 2 languages and 50+ library holdings.

- World Economy in the 1990s: a Japanese Central Banker's View (1990)
- Current Monetary and Economic Conditions in Japan (1993)
- 日本経済と中央銀行―前日銀総裁講演録 (1995)
- 利を見て義を思う: 三重野康の金融政策講義 (2000)

== Notes ==
Government offices
Preceded by Satoshi Sumita	Governor of the Bank of Japan; 1989–1994	Succeeded by Yasuo Matsushita
