= Tadashi Sasaki (banker) =

Japanese central banker

- 佐々木 直

21st Chairman of the Japan Association of Corporate Executives
- In office 25 April 1975 – 26 April 1985
- Preceded by: Kazutaka Kigawada
- Succeeded by: Takashi Ishihara

22nd Governor of the Bank of Japan
- In office 17 December 1969 – 16 December 1974
- Prime Minister: Eisaku Sato; Kakuei Tanaka; Takeo Miki
- Preceded by: Makoto Usami
- Succeeded by: Teiichiro Morinaga

Personal details
- Born: 17 May 1907 Yamaguchi, Japan
- Died: 7 July 1988 (aged 81)

Tadashi Sasaki (佐々木 直, Sasaki Tadashi; 5 May 1907 – 7 July 1988) was a Japanese central banker, and 22nd Governor of the Bank of Japan (BOJ).

== Early life ==
Sasaki was born in Yamaguchi Prefecture.

== Banking career ==
Sasaki was BOJ Governor from 17 December 1969 to 16 December 1974.

Immediately prior, he had been Deputy Governor.

== Tenure as BOJ Governor ==
During Sasaki's tenure, BOJ became a shareholder of the Bank for International Settlements BIS); however, in 1970, the head of the Japanese central bank was not invited to become a member of the BIS Board of Directors.

In 1972 Japan experienced an unexpectedly high rate of economic growth. However, the country began to increase its focus on social welfare and quality of life, which marked a significant change from Japan's policy of "economic growth first" in the years since the end of World War II.

Inflationary pressures occurred as a result of these measures, which Sasaki countered by forecasting tighter monetary policy in early 1973.

== Notes ==
Government offices
Preceded by Makoto Usami	Governor of the Bank of Japan	Succeeded by Teiichiro Morinaga
Business positions
Preceded by Kazutaka Kigawada	Chairman of the Japan Association of Corporate Executives; 1975–1985	Succeeded by Takashi Ishihara
