= G10 =

G10, G.X or G-10 or Group of Ten may refer to:

- Canon PowerShot G10
- G10 (agricultural), ten countries which are "vulnerable" to imports due to ongoing reform in the agricultural sector
- G10 (engine), Suzuki
- G-10 (material), a type of lightweight insulating used as the board in printed circuits.
- G10 currencies, the 10 most heavily traded currencies in the world
- G-10 Law, the German privacy law Gesetz zur Beschränkung des Brief-, Post- und Fernmeldegeheimnisses
- G10 Suifenhe–Manzhouli Expressway, China
- Group of Ten (economics), a group originally of ten, now eleven, industrial nations
- Solidaires Unitaires Démocratiques, a group of 10 different French trade unions
- A Samsung Sens laptop computer model
- Group of Ten, the ten leading environmental organizations in the United States
- NATO strap or G10 strap, a type of watch strap
- Maxus G10, a minivan
