= Yasuo Matsushita =

Japanese central banker (1926–2018)

Yasuo Matsushita (松下 康雄, Matsushita Yasuo, January 1, 1926 – July 20, 2018) was a Japanese businessman, central banker, the 27th Governor of the Bank of Japan (BOJ) and a Director of the Bank for International Settlements (BIS).

== Early life ==
Matsushita was born in Hyōgo prefecture. He is a graduate of Hyogo Prefectural 1st Kobe Boys’ School (now, Hyogo Prefectural Kobe High School) and the University of Tokyo Law School.

== Career ==
After the graduation from the University of Tokyo, he entered the Ministry of Finance in 1950. He smoothly moved up through the ranks to the level of Director-General of the Budget Bureau and Vice‐Minister of Finance. Matsushita became Governor of the Bank of Japan from December 17, 1994 to March 20, 1998. He died at 92.

== Notes ==
Government offices
Preceded by Yasushi Mieno	Governor of the Bank of Japan; 1994–1998	Succeeded by Masaru Hayami
