= Currency Museum of the Bank of Japan =

- 貨幣博物館
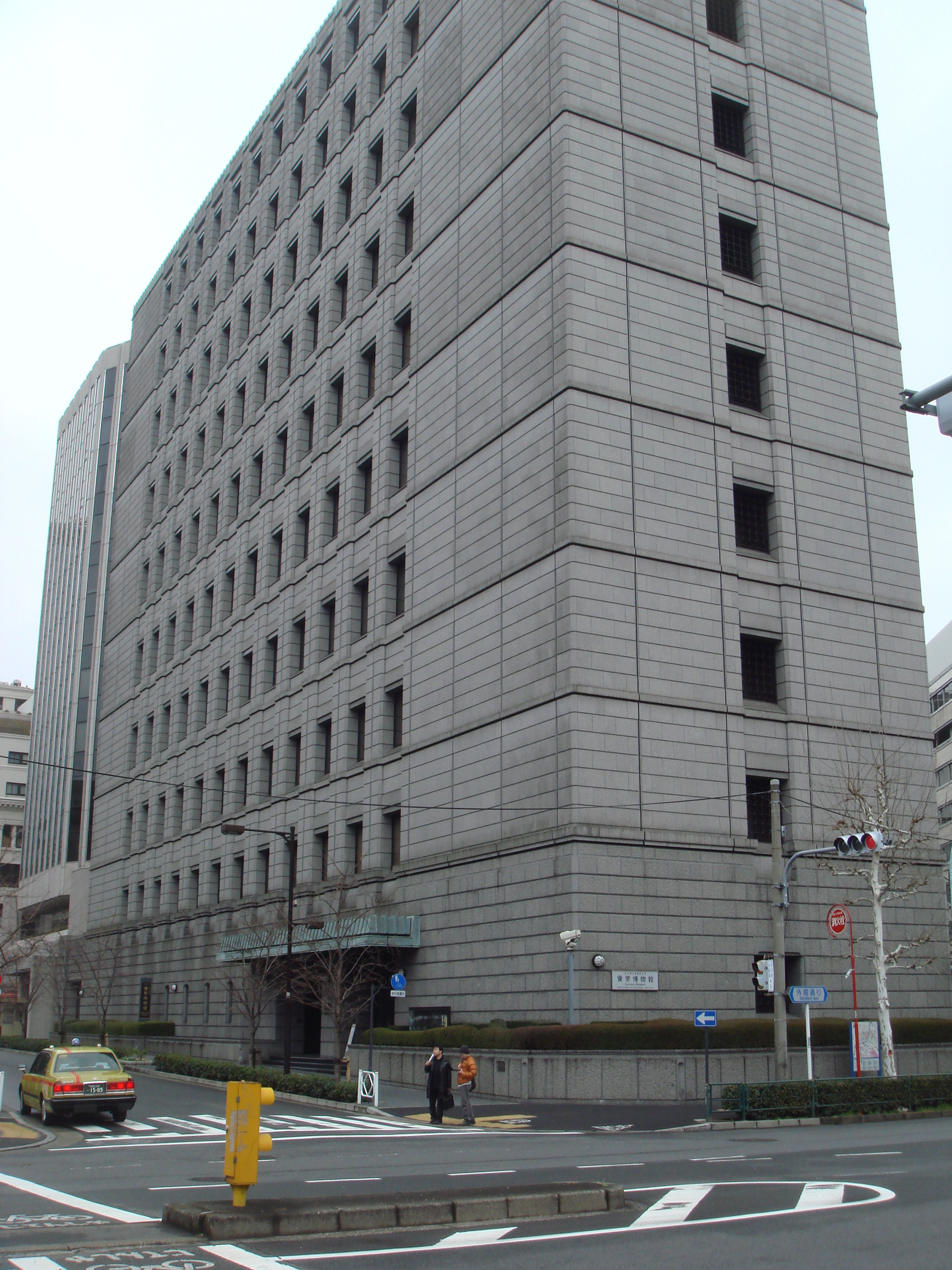
- The Japan Currency Museum in Nihonbashi
- Established: 1985
- Location: 2-1-1 Nihonbashi-hongokucho, Chūō, Tokyo
- Coordinates: 35°41′7.33″N 139°46′18.47″E
- Type: Numismatic museum
- Public transit access: Mitsukoshimae
- Website: www.imes.boj.or.jp (in English)

The Currency Museum of the Bank of Japan (貨幣博物館, Kahei-hakubutsukan), formally known as the Currency Museum, Institute for Monetary and Economic Studies, Bank of Japan (日本銀行金融研究所貨幣博物館, Nihonginkō-kin'yū-kenkyūjo-kahei-hakubutsukan), is a museum about Japanese currency located in front of the Bank of Japan building in Chūō, Tokyo.

The museum opened in November 1985. In 2010, there was an exhibition of wallets from the Edo Period (1603–1867) and Meiji Era (1868–1912).

== Gallery ==
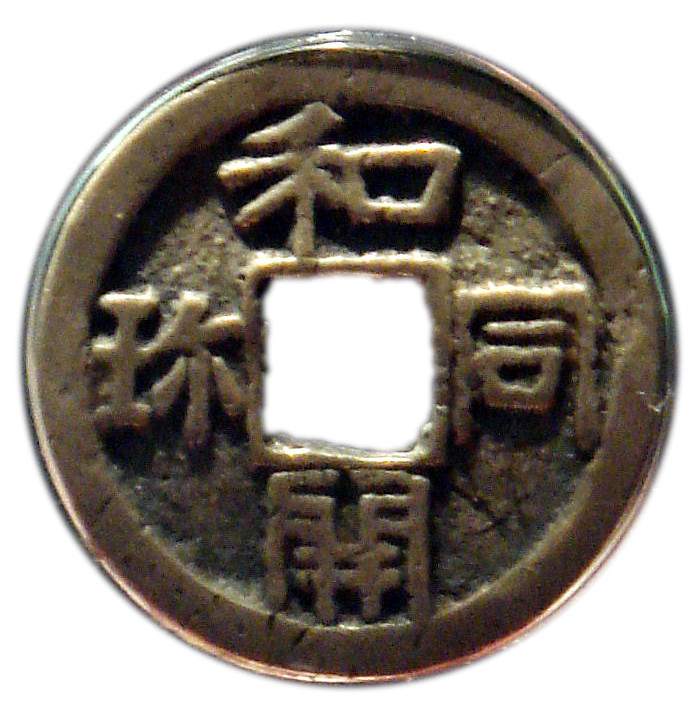
Wadōkaichin coin from 8th century Japan

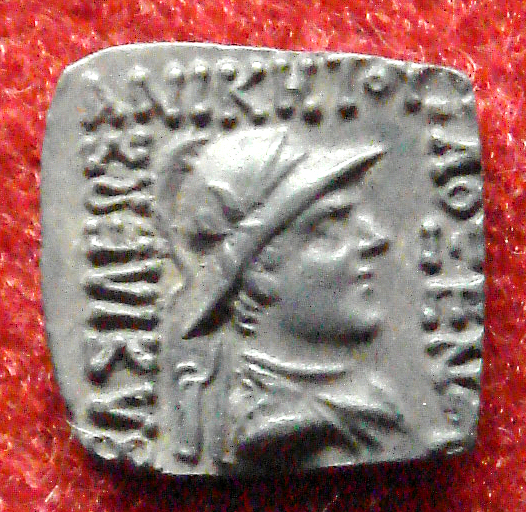
Philoxenus Indo-Greek coin in the Indian square standard

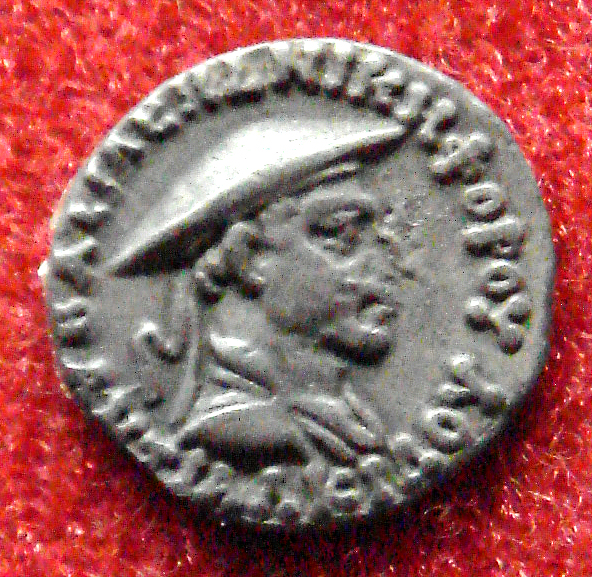
Antialcidas wearing the kausia

== See also ==
- Japanese currency
- List of museums in Tokyo
