= Window guidance =

Policy instrument used to regulate the supply of credit in a targeted industry

Window guidance (Japanese: 窓口指導) or informal guidance, is an informal policy instrument used to regulate the supply of credit in a specific industry or sector. Window guidance typically involves the use of benevolent compulsion in order to regulate the supply of credit as a way to achieve policy targets such as sustainability. Window guidance involves the use of monetary policy instruments including lending quotas as an informal way to subsidize or regulate the volume of banking credit in a given industry or financial sector. Window guidance is often associated with the Bank of Japan's policies during the Japanese economic miracle, although similar policies have been widely used in the post WWII era in other Asian countries, as well as Western European countries (France, UK, Belgium, Germany) and Canada.

Window guidance has been noted for causing favouritism for capital allocation, as well as being a form of direct government intervention.

== History ==
=== Japan ===
Window guidance originated as a way for the Japanese government to finance Japanese rebuilding efforts during the early stages of the Japanese economic miracle. Under the Bank of Japan Law of 1958, the Ministry of Finance took control over the Bank of Japan's administration, embedding Japanese government fiscal goals into the Bank of Japan's instruments and allowing for greater flexibility in the regulation of the money supply. During Hayato Ikeda's income doubling plan during the 1960s, the Bank of Japan was given "full control" of the monetary instruments in the economy and was fully responsible for the swings in the business cycle during the 1960s to 1970s period. This, combined with strict capital controls suppressing the private sector's ability to issue corporate bonds, gave the Bank of Japan a substantial amount of influence in the bond market.

This control, however, was eroded during the liberalization of the foreign exchange market as part of the revision of the Foreign Exchange Control Law in 1980, the signing of the Plaza Accord of 1985, and the creation of a bilateral trade agreement with the United States. By the Mid 1980s, foreign direct investment in Japan was completely liberalized, resulting in a dramatic rise in the number of foreign currency bonds issued. During the Japanese Asset Bubble, the Bank of Japan strengthened its window guidance on bank lending in an attempt to tame surging asset inflation. However, as the Bank of Japan notes,

"While window guidance in Japan similarly played a major role in monetary policy in the past, financial liberalization in the 1980s gradually undermined its effectiveness because liberalization led to the expansion of various financial intermediary channels unrestrained by window guidance."

The subsequent failure to tame asset inflation, and the ensuing Lost Decades, caused the Bank of Japan to transition from window guidance to other less direct expansionary monetary policy instruments including quantitative easing.

=== China ===
The People's Bank of China (PBOC) adopted window guidance in the early 1990s to ensure the profitability of the commercial banks within the Chinese financial system. Window guidance has recently been used as a tool to slow the expansion of credit in the Chinese property bubble and the 2015–2016 Chinese stock market bubble. In a similar manner to Japan, liberalization of capital controls has led to a decline in the effectiveness of window guidance, resulting in the exponential growth of credit and asset instability. In the recent 2020–2022 Chinese property sector crisis, the People's Bank of China has attempted to use window guidance in order to support lending amidst a credit crunch.

Between 2007 until 2015, the PBOC introduced green window guidance targets in order to discourage banks to lend to carbon-intensive and polluting activities. In 2021, the PBOC introduced a dedicated green lending facility (CERF) aimed at encouraging banks to issue more green lending at a preferential interest rate.

== See also ==
- Forward guidance
