= Bank of Japan =

Monetary authority of Japan

Bank of Japan 日本銀行

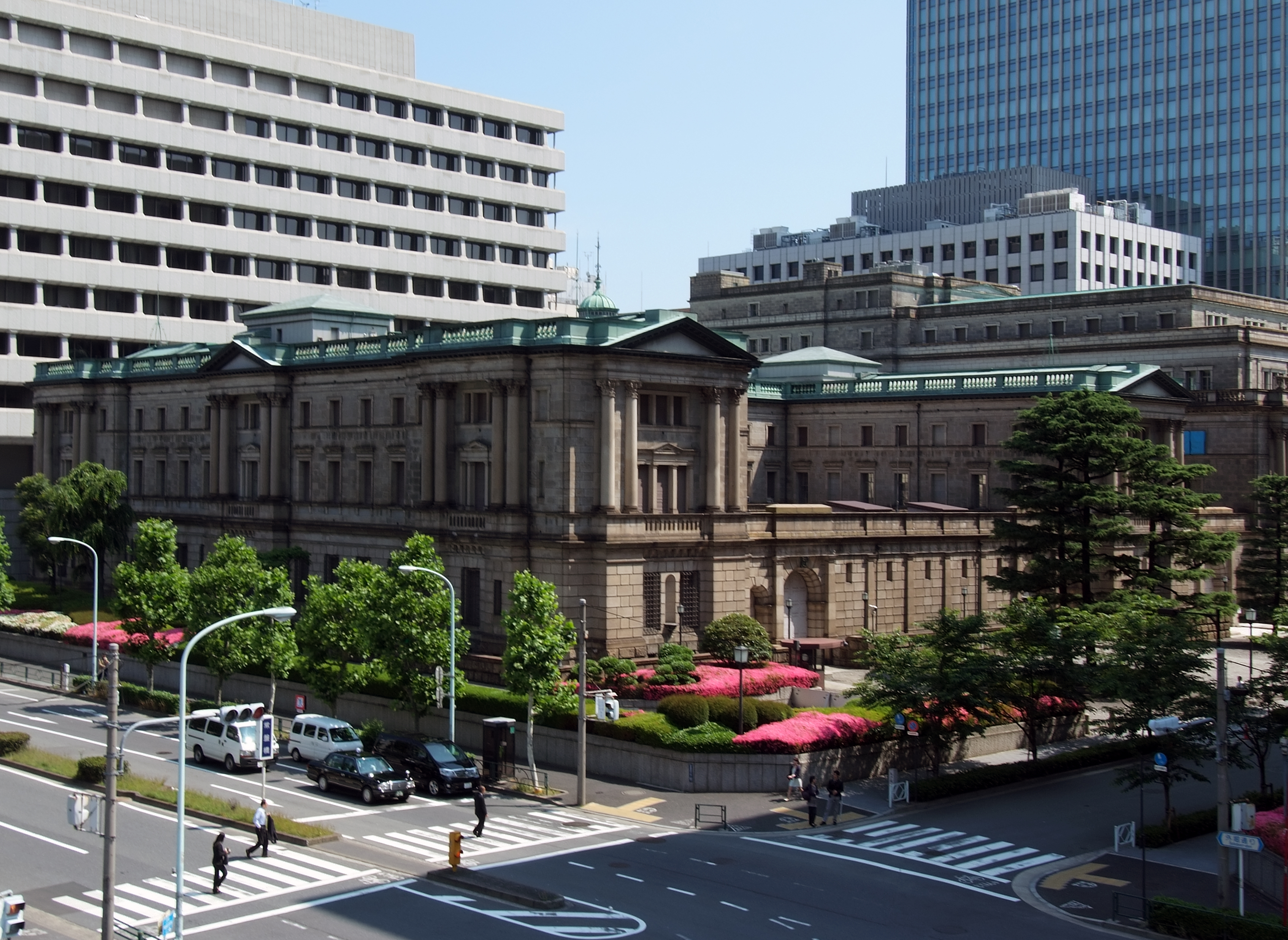
- Headquarters in Chūō, Tokyo
- Central bank of: Japan
- Headquarters: Chūō, Tokyo, Japan
- Coordinates: 35.6861°N 139.7715°E
- Established: 27 June/10 October 1882
- Ownership: At least 55% of all capital must be owned by the Government of Japan (Note: The rest are publicly traded over-the-counter in the Tokyo Stock Exchange (TYO: 8301). Neither the Government nor the private investors have voting power over the Bank's operations)
- Governor: Kazuo Ueda (9 April 2023 – present)
- Currency: Yen; JPY (ISO 4217)
- Reserves: US$1.12 trillion (October 2023)
- Bank rate: 1.25%
- Website: boj.or.jp

The Bank of Japan (日本銀行, Nippon Ginkō; BOJ) is the central bank of Japan. The bank is often called Nichigin (日銀) for short. It is headquartered in Nihonbashi, Chūō, Tokyo.

The bank is a corporate entity independent of the Japanese government, and while it is not an administrative organisation of the state, its monetary policy falls within the scope of administration. Its autonomy and independence are granted to ensure long-term public welfare and political neutrality, as well as to pursue long-term monetary goals irrespective of short-term political goals pursued by the legislative and executive branch.

== History ==
=== Background ===
Like most modern Japanese institutions, the Bank of Japan was founded after the Meiji Restoration. Prior to the Restoration, Japan's feudal fiefs all issued their own money, hansatsu, in an array of incompatible denominations, but the New Currency Act of Meiji 4 (1871) did away with these and established the yen as the new decimal currency, which had parity with the Mexican silver dollar. The former han (fiefs) became prefectures and their mints became private chartered banks which, however, initially retained the right to print money. For a time both the central government and these so-called national banks issued money.

=== Foundation and early development ===
Finance minister Matsukata Masayoshi initially proposed the creation of the bank of Japan sometime in March 1882, soon enacted in the Bank of Japan Act (Imperial Ordinance) of 27 June 1882 and formally founded on 10 October 1882. The primary source of inspiration for the bank's design was the National Bank of Belgium (est. 1850) which was viewed as one of the best-designed European central banks of its era. Since then, the Bank of Japan has been partly privately owned. Its stock is traded over the counter, hence the stock number. A number of modifications based on other national banks were encompassed within the regulations under which the bank was founded. In 1883, all national banks were stripped of their banknote issuance privilege, and the Bank of Japan was given a monopoly on controlling the money supply in 1884. Still, it would be another 20 years before all previously issued notes were retired.

Following the passage of the Convertible Bank Note Regulations (May 1884), the Bank of Japan issued its first banknotes in 1885 (Meiji 18). Despite some small glitches—for example, it turned out that the konjac powder mixed in the paper to prevent counterfeiting made the bills a delicacy for rats—the run was largely successful. In 1897, Japan joined the gold standard, and in 1899 the former "national" banknotes were formally phased out.

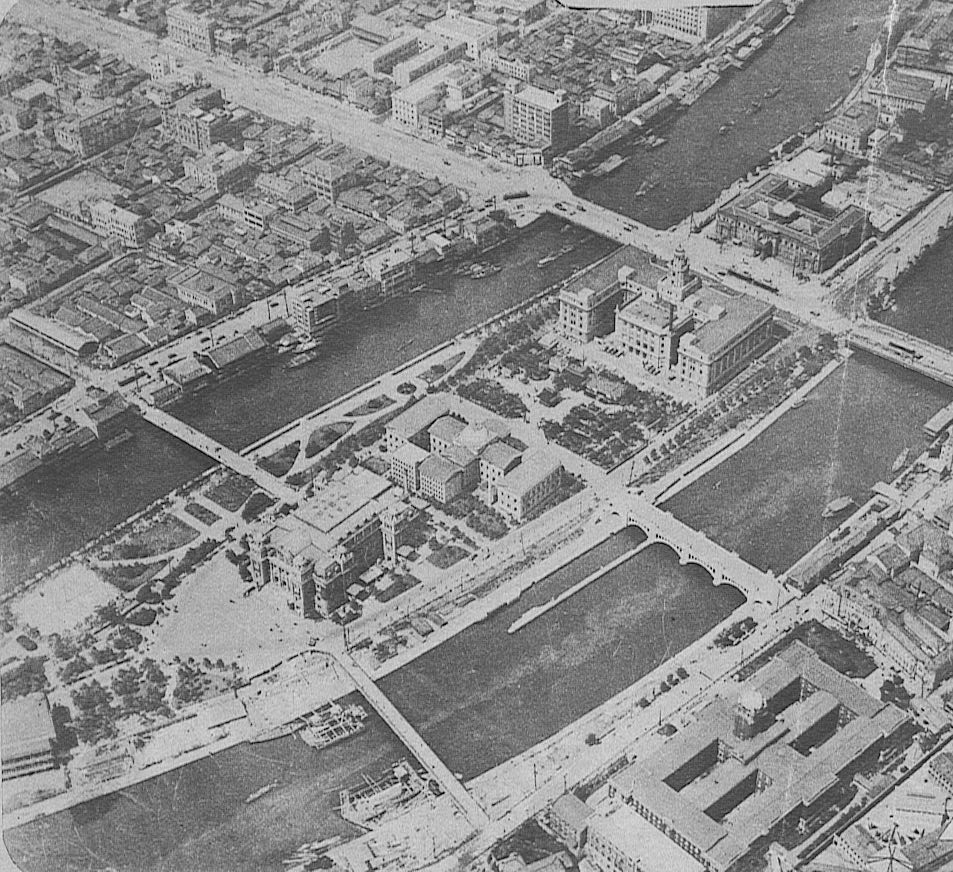
The Osaka branch of the Bank of Japan is seen in the top right of this 1930 aerial photograph. The wide street in front of the bank is part of the Mido-Suji.

In the early 20th century the Bank of Japan, while a private-sector institution, worked in close coordination with the Japanese government and took direction from the minister of Finance. Its governor, as Takahashi Korekiyo put it, was considered "the number-one representative of the business world" in Japan's institutional system.

=== World War II and aftermath ===
The Bank of Japan was reorganized in 1942 (fully only after 1 May 1942), under the Bank of Japan Act of 1942 (日本銀行法 昭和17年法律第67号), promulgated on 24 February 1942. There was a brief post-war period during the Occupation of Japan when the bank's functions were suspended, and military currency was issued. In 1949, the bank was again restructured.

In the 1970s, the bank's operating environment evolved along with the transition from a fixed foreign currency exchange rate and a rather closed economy to a large open economy with a variable exchange rate.

During the entire post-war era, until at least 1991, the Bank of Japan's monetary policy has primarily been conducted via its 'window guidance' (窓口指導, madoguchi shindō) credit controls (which are the model for the Chinese central bank's primary tool of monetary policy implementation), whereby the central bank would impose bank credit growth quotas on the commercial banks. The tool was instrumental in the creation of the 'bubble economy' of the 1980s. It was implemented by the Bank of Japan's then "Business Department" (営業局, Eigyō Kyoku), which was headed during the "bubble years" from 1986 to 1989 by Toshihiko Fukui (who became deputy governor in the 1990s and governor in 2003).

A major 1997 revision of the Bank of Japan Act was designed to give it greater independence; however, the Bank of Japan has been criticized for already possessing excessive independence and lacking in accountability before this law was promulgated. A certain degree of dependence might be said to be enshrined in the new Law, article 4 of which states:

In recognition of the fact that currency and monetary control is a component of overall economic policy, the Bank of Japan shall always maintain close contact with the government and exchange views sufficiently, so that its currency and monetary control and the basic stance of the government's economic policy shall be mutually harmonious.

However, since the introduction of the new law, the Bank of Japan has rebuffed government requests to stimulate the economy.

=== Boom and bust cycles ===
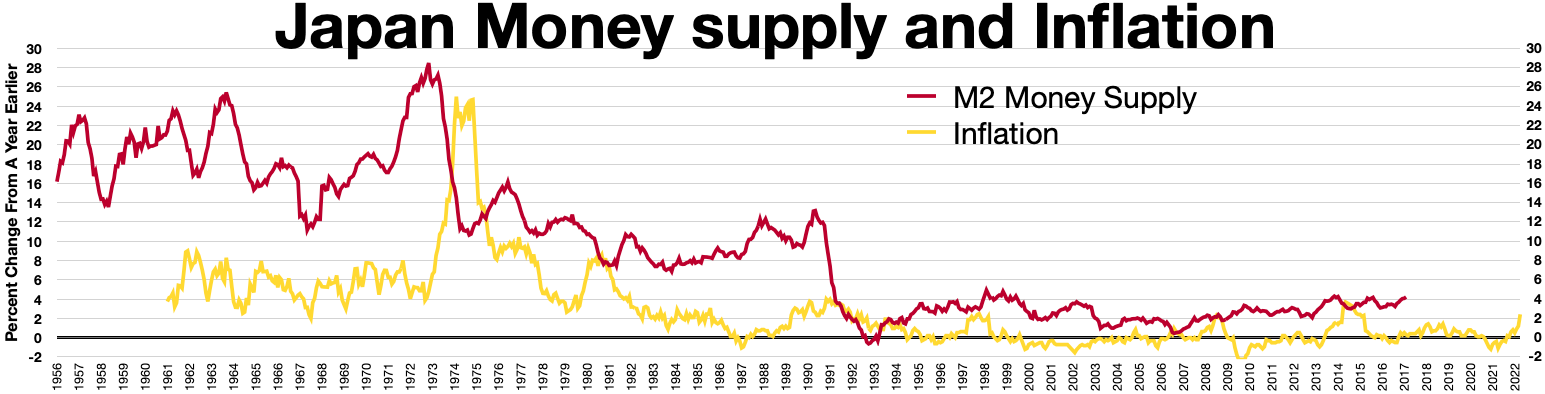
Japan money supply and inflation (year over year) M2 money supply Inflation

When the Nixon shock happened in August 1971, the Bank of Japan (BOJ) could have appreciated the currency in order to avoid inflation. However, they still kept the fixed exchange rate as 360Yen/$ for two weeks, so it caused excess liquidity. In addition, they persisted with the Smithsonian rate (308Yen/$), and continued monetary easing until 1973. This created a greater-than-10% inflation rate at that time. In order to control stagflation, they raised the official bank rate from 7% to 9% and skyrocketing prices gradually ended in 1978.

In 1979, when the energy crisis happened, the BOJ raised the official bank rate rapidly. The BOJ succeeded in a quick economic recovery. After overcoming the crisis, they reduced the official bank rate. In 1980, the BOJ reduced the official bank rate from 9.0% to 8.25% in August, to 7.25% in November, and to 5.5% in December in 1981. "Reaganomics" was in vogue in America and USD became strong. However, Japan tried to implement fiscal reconstruction at that time, so they did not stop their financial regulation.

In 1985, the agreement of G5 nations, known as the Plaza Accord, USD slipped down and Yen/USD changed from 240yen/$ to 200yen/$ at the end of 1985. Even in 1986, USD continued to fall and reached 160yen/$. In order to escape deflation, the BOJ cut the official bank rate from 5% to 4.5% in January, to 4.0% in March, to 3.5% in April, 3.0% in November. At the same time, the government tried to raise demand in Japan in 1985, and did economy policy in 1986. However, the market was confused about the rapid fall of USD. After the Louvre Accord in February 1987, the BOJ decreased the official bank rate from 3% to 2.5%, but JPY/USD was 140yen/$ at that time and reached 125yen/$ in the end of 1987. The BOJ kept the official bank rate at 2.5% until May in 1989. Financial and fiscal regulation led to a widespread over-valuing of real estate and investments and Japan faced a bubble at that time.

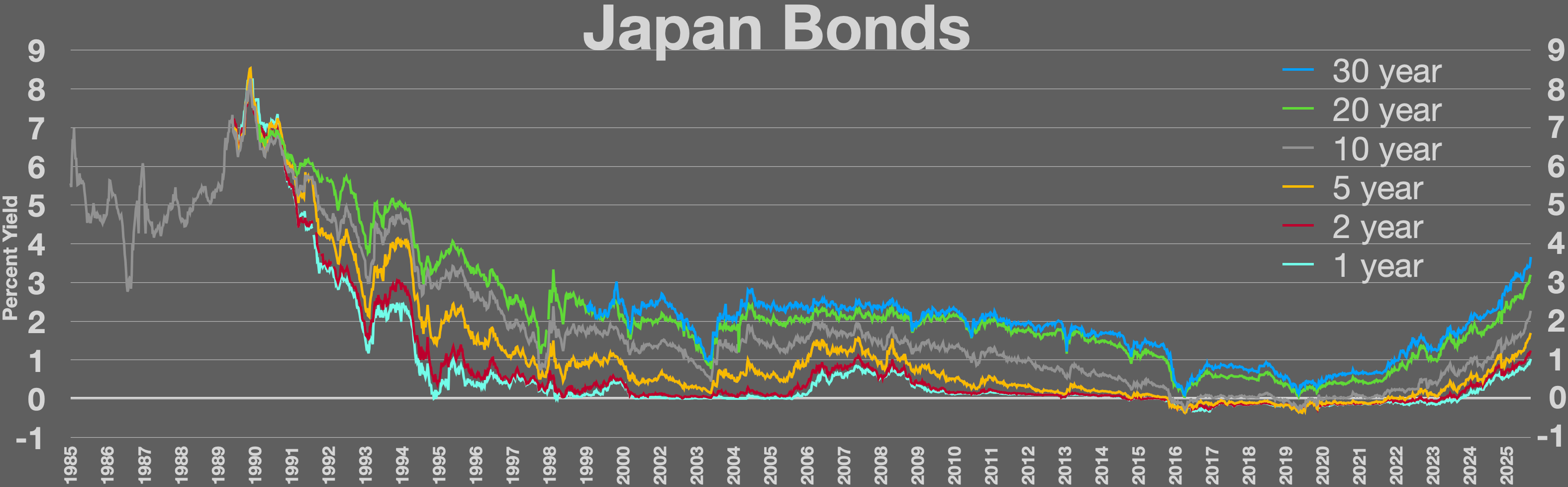
Japan bonds Inverted yield curve in 1990 Zero interest-rate policy started in 1999 Negative interest policy started in 2016 30 year 20 year 10 year 5 year 2 year 1 year

After 1990, the stock market and real asset market fell. At that time BOJ regulated markets until 1991 in order to end the bubble.

In January 1995, the Great Hanshin earthquake occurred and the Japanese yen became stronger. JPY/USD reached 80yen/$, so the BOJ reduced the office bank rate to 0.5% and the yen recovered. The period of deflation started at that time.

In 1999, the BOJ started zero-interest-rate policy (ZIRP), but they ended it despite government opposition when the IT bubble happened in 2000. However, Japan's economic bubble burst in 2001 and the BOJ adopted the balance of current account as the main operating target for the adjustment of the financial market in March 2001 (quantitative relaxation policy), shifting from the zero-interest-rate policy. From 2003 to 2004, Japanese government did exchange intervention operation in huge amount, and the economy recovered a lot. In March 2006, BOJ finished quantitative easing, and finished the zero-interest-rate policy in June and raised to 0.25%.

During the 2008 financial crisis, BOJ reduced the uncollateralized call rate to 0.3% and adopted the supplemental balance of current account policy. In December 2008, BOJ reduced uncollateralized call rate again to 0.1% and they started to buy Japanese Government Bond (JGB) along with commercial paper (CP) and corporate bonds.

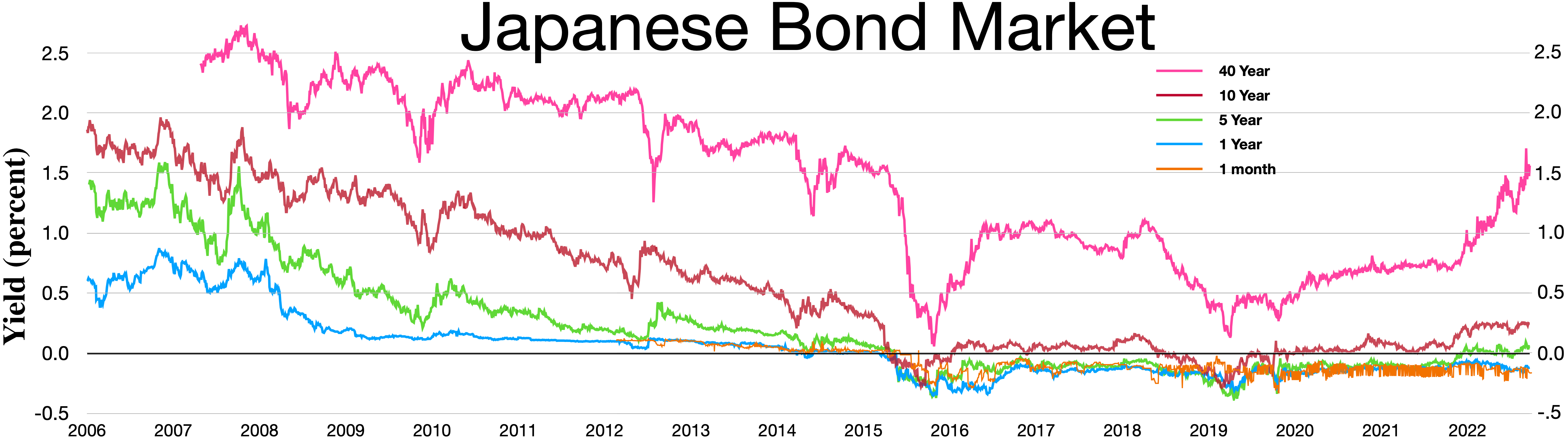
Japanese bond market Negative interest rates started in 2014. 40 year bond 10 year bond 5 year bond 1 year bond 1 month bond

In 2013, the head of the BOJ (Kuroda) announced a new quantitative easing program (QE). This program would be very large in terms of quantity, but it would also be different in terms of quality—qualitative easing (QQE). In other words, the BOJ would (and did) also purchase riskier assets like stocks and REITs. In 2016, the BOJ initiated yield curve control (YCC), and started its negative interest rates policy (NIRP). The BOJ is also the largest owner of Japanese stocks. In 2024, following announcements of about 5% wage growth by Japan's largest companies, the BOJ ended eight year of negative interest rates by setting new short term targets of 0 to 0.1%.

In December 2025, the BOJ raised its short-term policy target to a 30-year high of 0.75 per cent as it believed that Japan was on the cusp of durably achieving its 2 per cent inflation target. However, escalating conflicts in the Middle East resulted in pressure for the BOJ holding off on raising rates further in light of surging oil prices.

=== Curbing deflation ===
Following the election of Prime Minister Shinzō Abe in December 2012, the Bank of Japan, with Abe's urging, took proactive steps to curb deflation in Japan. On 30 October 2012, the Bank of Japan announced that it would undertake further monetary-easing action for the second time in a month. Under the leadership of new Governor Haruhiko Kuroda, the Bank of Japan released a statement on 5 April 2013 announcing that it would be purchasing securities and bonds at a rate of 60-70 trillion yen a year in an attempt to double Japan's money base in two years. But by 2016, it was apparent that three years of monetary easing had little effect on deflation so the Bank of Japan instigated a review of its monetary stimulus program.

== Operations ==
=== Objectives ===
The comprehensive revision of the Bank of Japan Act in 1998 clearly defined the objectives of the Bank of Japan as 'price stability' and 'financial system stability'. This revision affirmed the Bank's operation independent from the government (primarily the Ministry of Finance), and removed the provisions established in 1942, which had been problematic. The 1942 provision, enacted during the Second World War, stated the objective of the bank was to 'Ensure the Appropriate Exertion of the Nation's Total Economic Power, by Regulating Currency, Adjusting Finance, and Maintaining and Fostering the Credit System in Accordance with the Policies of the State (国家経済総力ノ適切ナル発揮ヲ図ル為国家ノ政策ニ即シ通貨ノ調節、金融ノ調整及信用制度ノ保持育成ニ任ズル。)'.

BoJ's policies are decided at Monetary Policy Meetings (MPM, Kinyu Seisaku Kettei Kaigo, 金融政策決定会合), which are attended by the Policy Board and held every other month.

==== Price stability ====
Stable prices are maintained by seeking to ensure that price increases meet the inflation target. The bank aims to meet this target primarily by adjusting the base interest rate (known as the bank rate), which is decided by the Policy Board.

As of 2024 the inflation target is 2%. Japan has long suffered deflation and disinflation since the 1990s, which has been blamed as one of the main causes of the long-term economic downturn of the once world's second largest economy. For the past two decades, the primary focus of BOJ policies has been to achieve a stable inflation.

==== Financial system stability ====
Financial system is defined as the overall structure of receipt and payment as well as lending and borrowing of money, and its stability refers to 'a state in which the financial system functions properly, and participants, such as firms and individuals, have confidence in the system'.

=== Functions ===
The aforementioned objectives are realised through the exertion of the functions mentioned below.

- As the sole issuer of banknotes of Japan, BoJ carries out the issuance and management of Bank of Japan notes.
- BoJ implements monetary policy through methods such as policy interest rate (formerly known as the official discount rate) operations, open market operations, and reserve requirement ratio operations, thereby adjusting the volume of money in circulation to stabilise prices and the national economy.
- BoJ facilitates transactions among financial institutions using its current accounts, effectively acting as a 'bank for banks'. (Individuals and corporations (such as general businesses) are not allowed to open accounts with BoJ.)
- BoJ serves as the government's bank for the disbursement and receipt of public funds.
- As a 'bank of banks', BoJ ensures the stability of the financial order through smooth fund settlements via domestic exchange transactions and providing system collateral (acting as the "lender of last resort") through facilities such as BoJ's special lending programme (日銀特融, Nichigin Tokuyu). Transactions in deposits and loans are restricted to financial institutions designated in accordance with the Bank of Japan Act.
- BoJ conducts international relations activities, including interventions in the foreign exchange market, with other central banks and public institutions worldwide.
- BoJ collects and researches financial and economic information, and compiles and publishes economic statistics.

=== Financial holdings ===
Bank of Japan owns 4.7% of Japanese public stocks. Since 2020 it has owned more domestic stock than any other body.

On 30 October 2026, the bank announced that it would increase annual sales of its exchange-traded fund holdings from approximately ¥330 billion to ¥860 billion on a book-value basis, effective January 2027. The bank estimated that the revised pace would reduce the time needed to dispose of its holdings from approximately 112 years to 43 years.

== Buildings ==
=== Headquarters ===
The Tokyo head office building of the BOJ is located in Nihonbashi, Chuo. It is on the site of a former gold mint (Kinza) and, not coincidentally, near the famous Ginza district, whose name means "silver mint". The building was designed by architect Tatsuno Kingo in eclectic style in 1890, and completed in 1896 under the direction of entrepreneur Shibusawa Eiichi. Tatsuno had been influenced by the architecture of the Bank of England and especially of the National Bank of Belgium (NBB)'s buildings in Brussels and Antwerp, paralleling the NBB's influence on the institutional design of the Bank of Japan.

Tatsuno's former engineer and successor as the bank's architect, Nagano Uheiji, directed repairs of the bank's building following the 1923 Great Kantō earthquake. In the 1930s, he designed extensions of the building on its northern and eastern sides, in the same eclectic style but using reinforced concrete. The eastern extension is still extant, whereas the northern extension was replaced after 30 years by a larger building designed in 1966 by Matsuda Hirata Architects. Completed in 1973 and the largest building in the complex, it has 10 floors overground and 5 floors underground. Finally, the south annex building, erected 1982–1984, is the home of Currency Museum of the Bank of Japan and of the bank’s Institute for Monetary and Economic Studies (IMES).

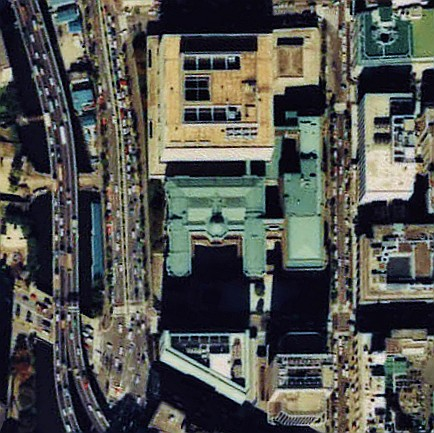
Aerial view (1984) with original building and eastern extension (green roofs), new building (top), and southern annex (bottom left)

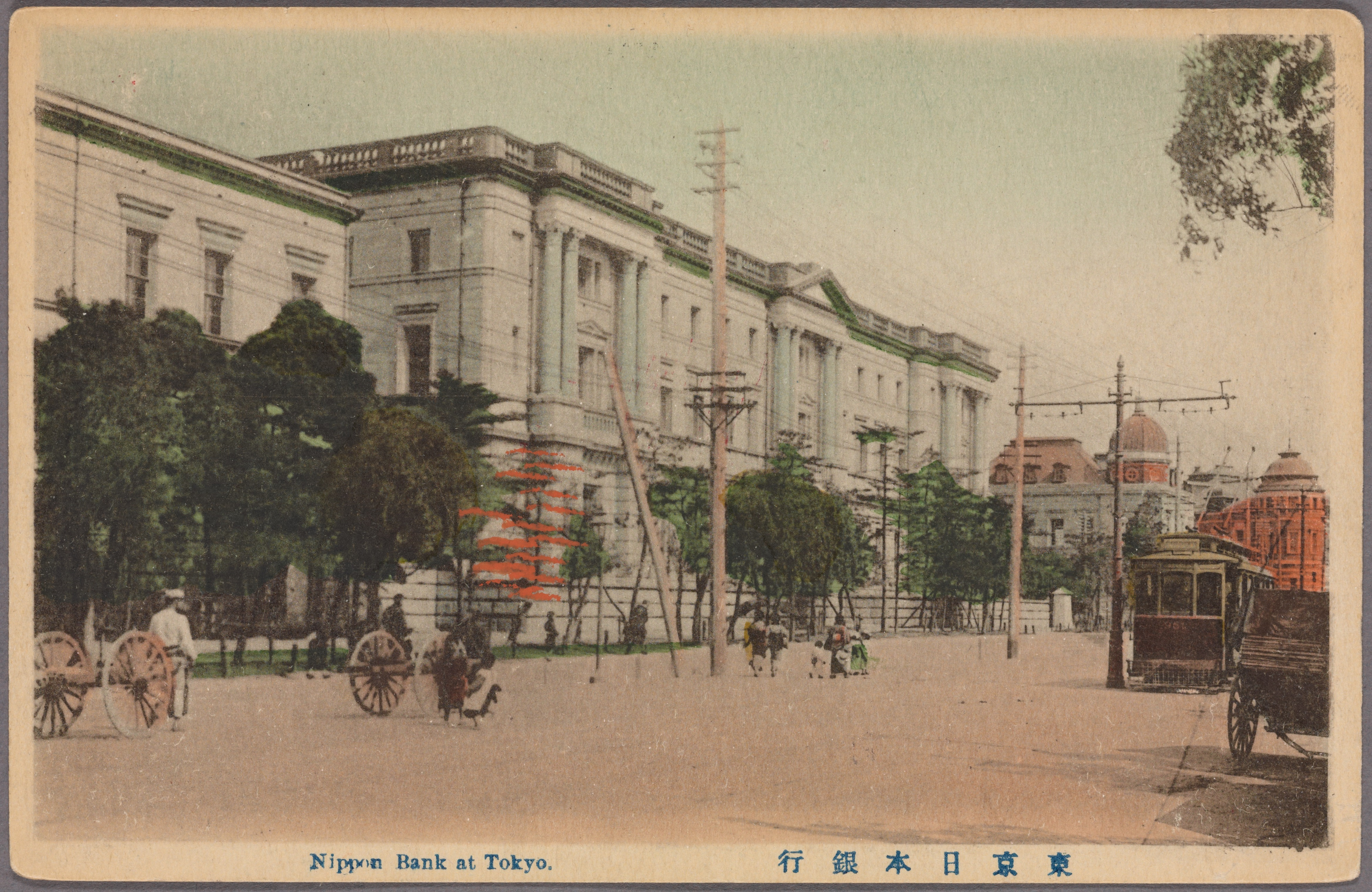
The main building in 1922. The bank vault was designed by Frederick S. Holmes.

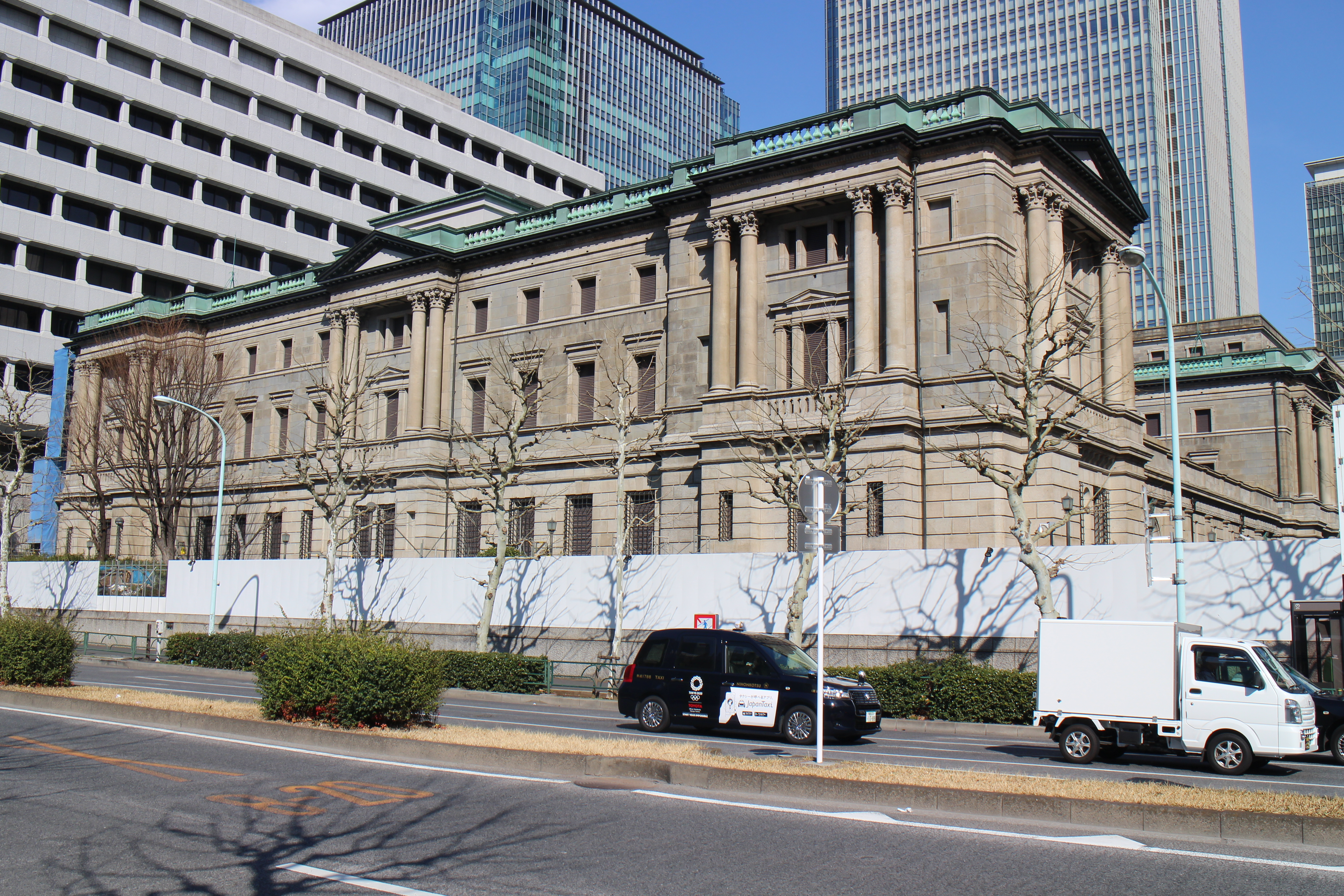
The same building, photographed in 2019

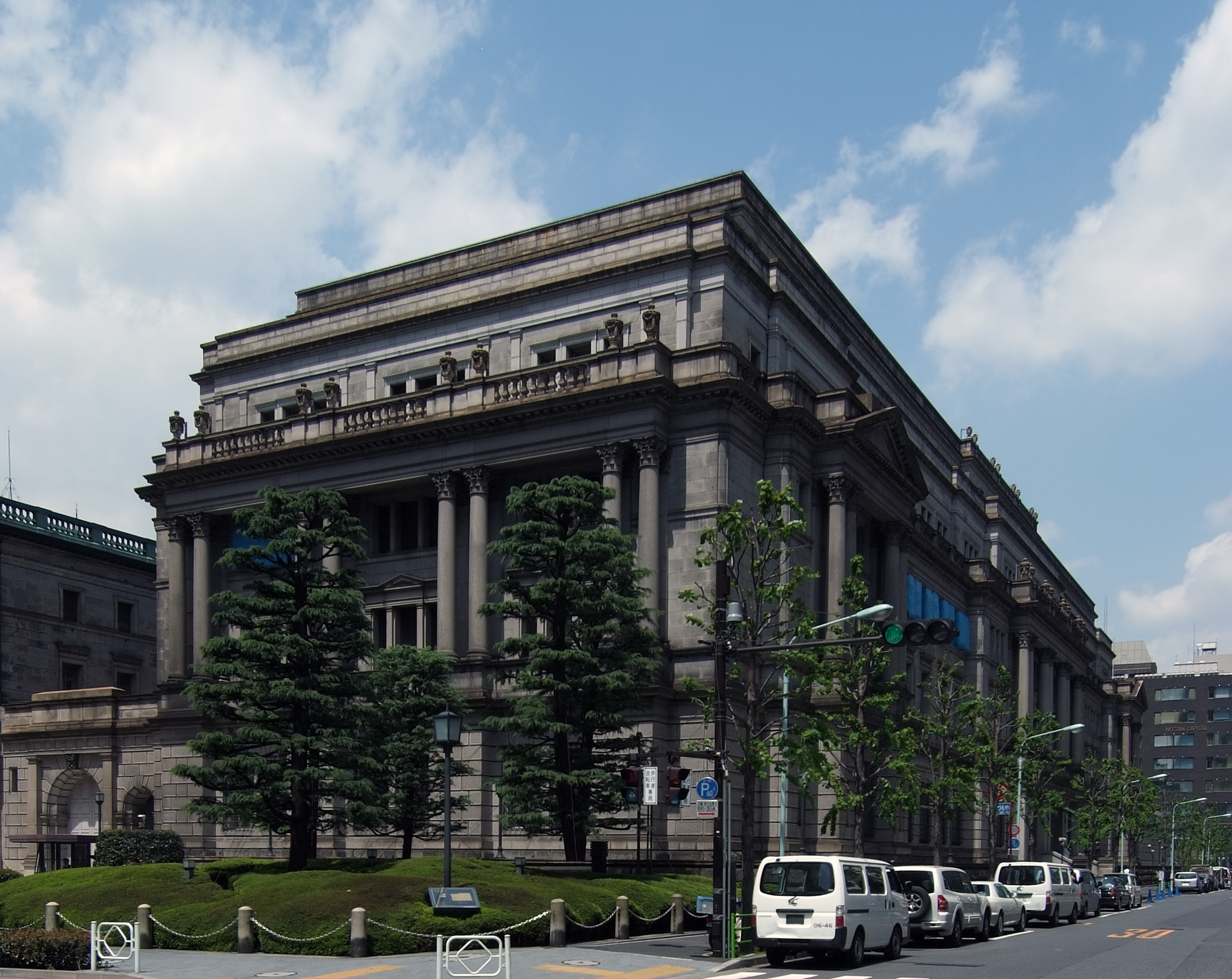
Nagano's 1930s extension

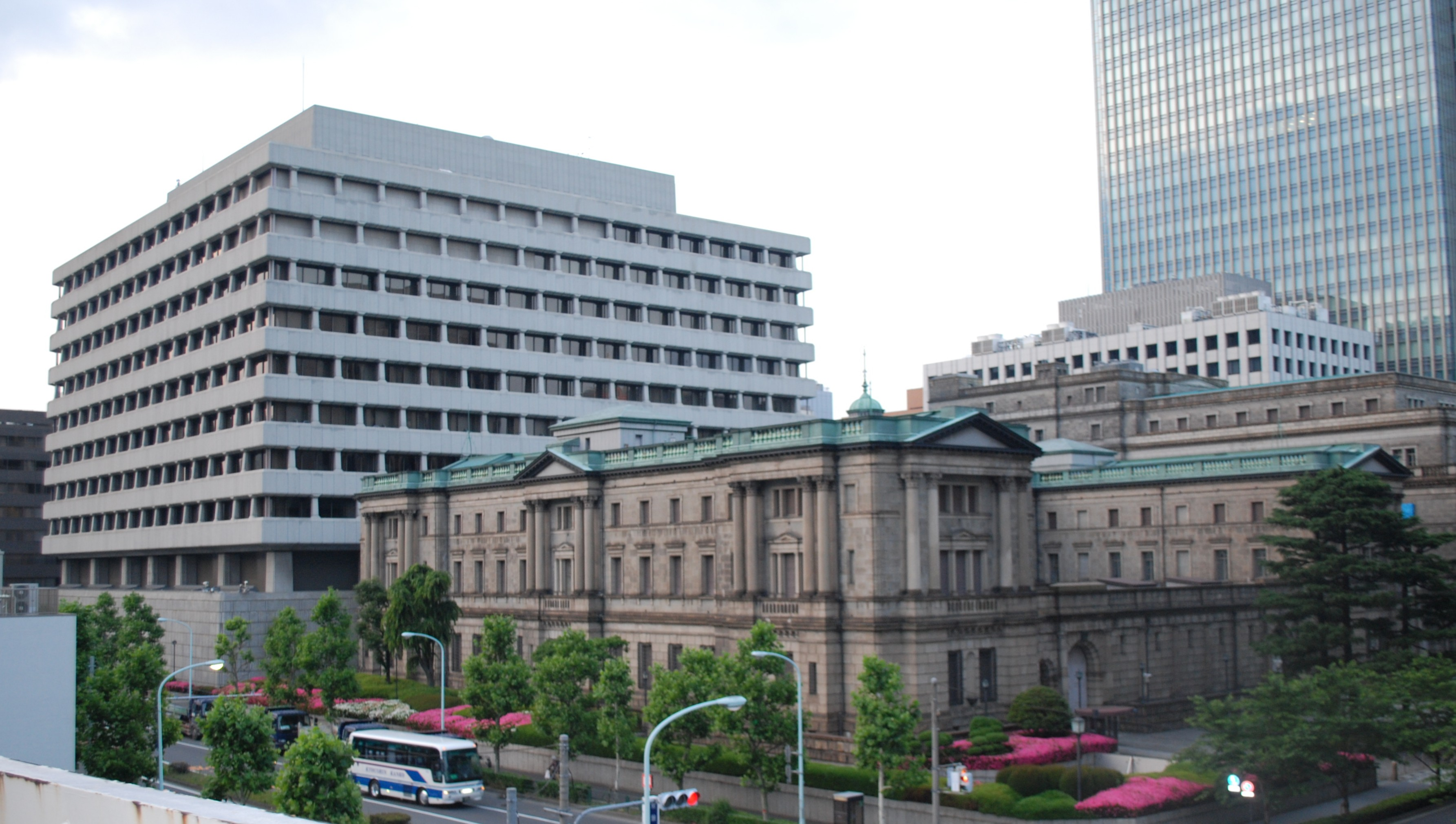
The 1970s extension behind the original building

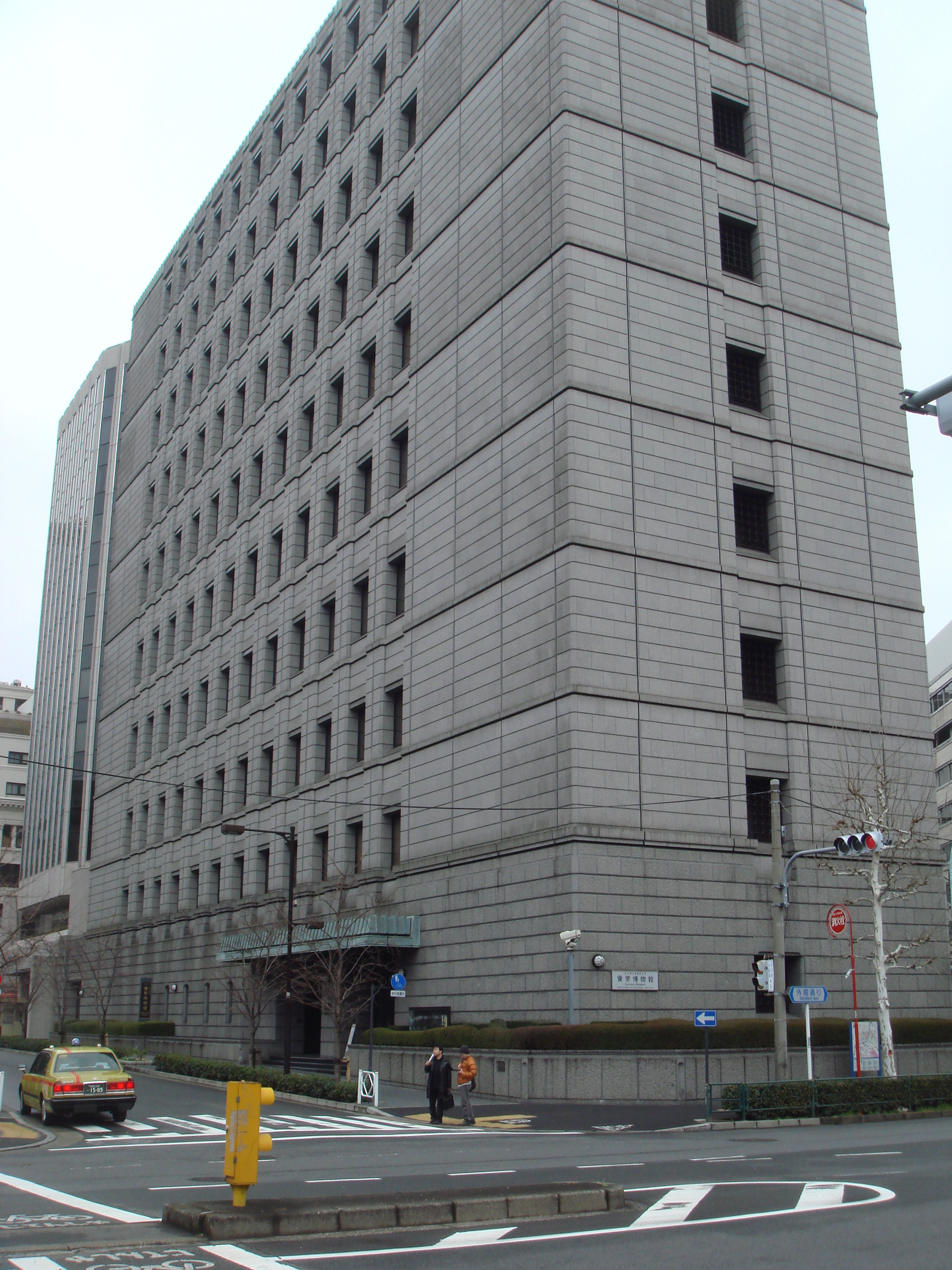
Southern annex

=== Branches ===
Tatsuno also designed the Bank of Japan's branch on Nakanoshima Island in Osaka, completed in 1903 and still in use following remodeling and extension in 1982, as well as the branch buildings in Kyoto (1906) and Otaru (1912), both now museums, and those no longer standing in Moji-ku, Kitakyūshū (1898), Hiroshima (1905), Nagoya (1906), Kanazawa (1909), Hakodate (1911), Fukushima (1913). In the 1920s and 1930s, Nagano designed more branch buildings in neoclassical style in Okayama (1922), Kobe (1927), Matsuyama (1932), Hiroshima (replacing Tatsuno's, 1936), and Matsue (1938).

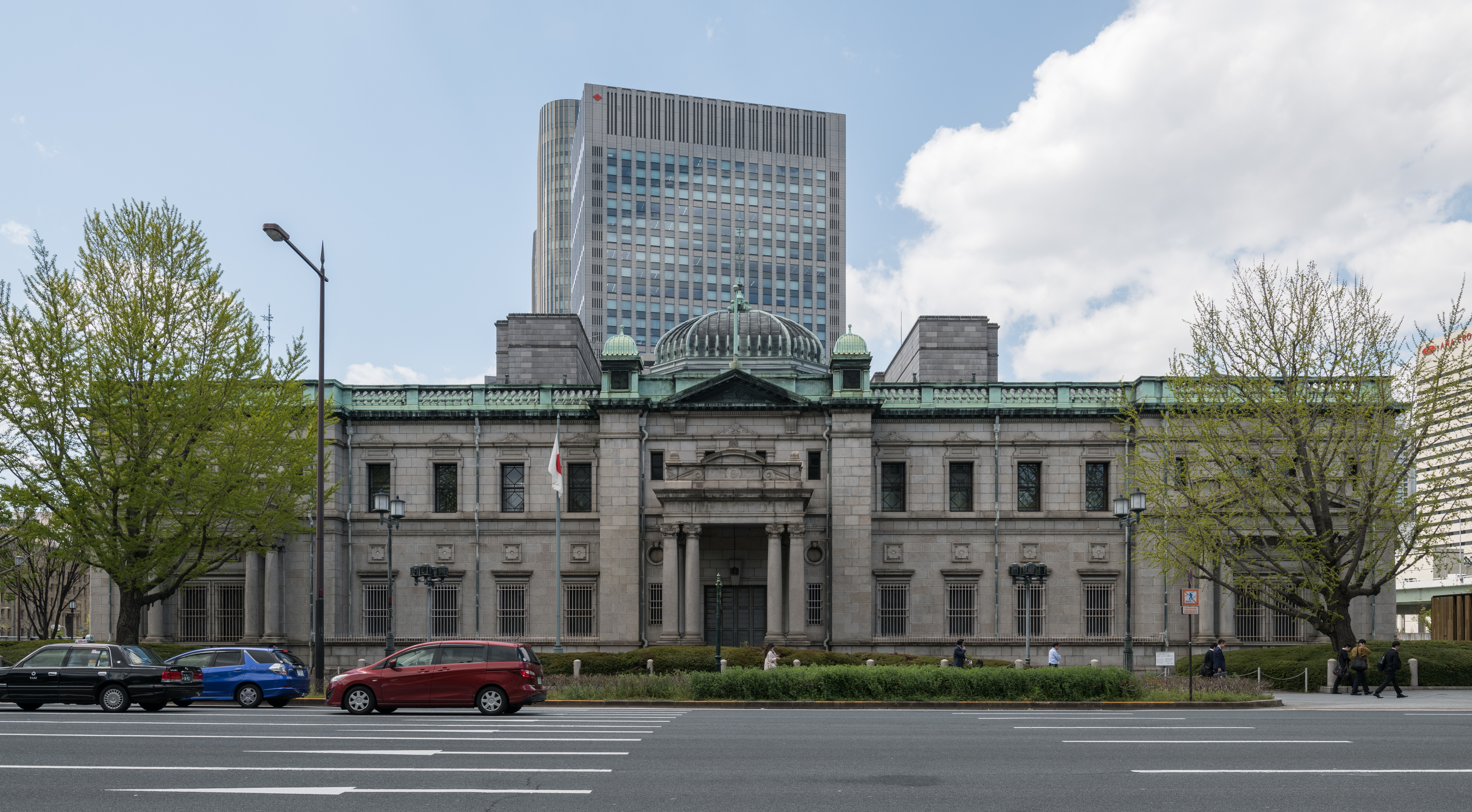
Branch building in Osaka

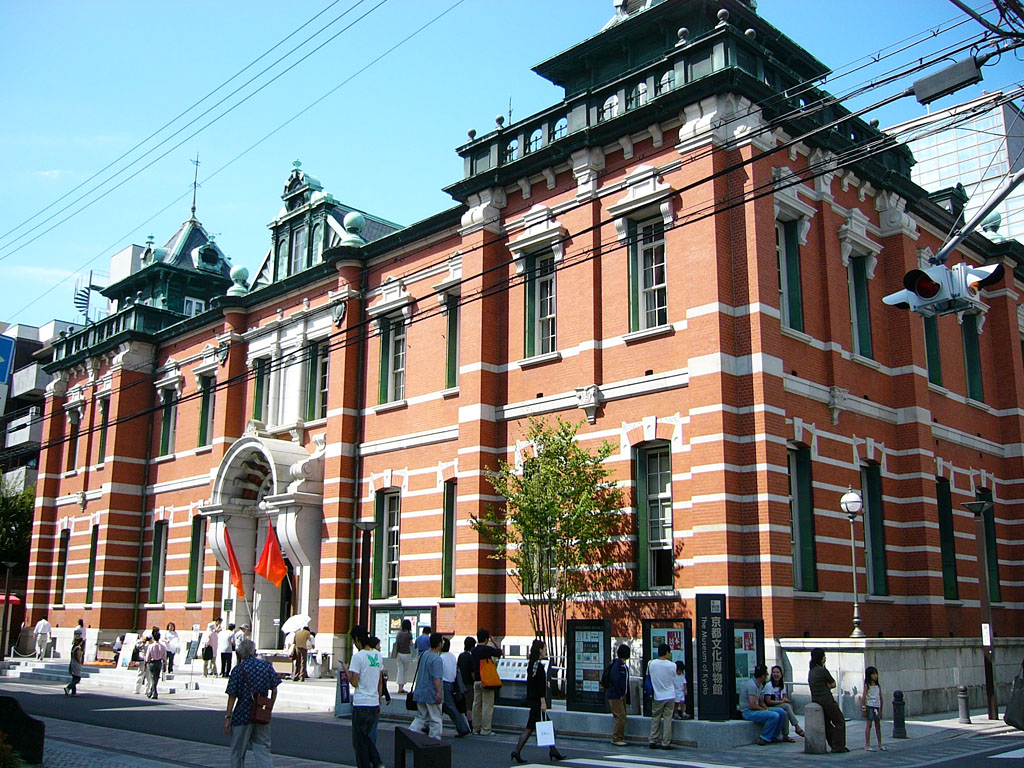
Former branch building in Kyoto, since 1968 a museum and since the 1980s part of the Museum of Kyoto

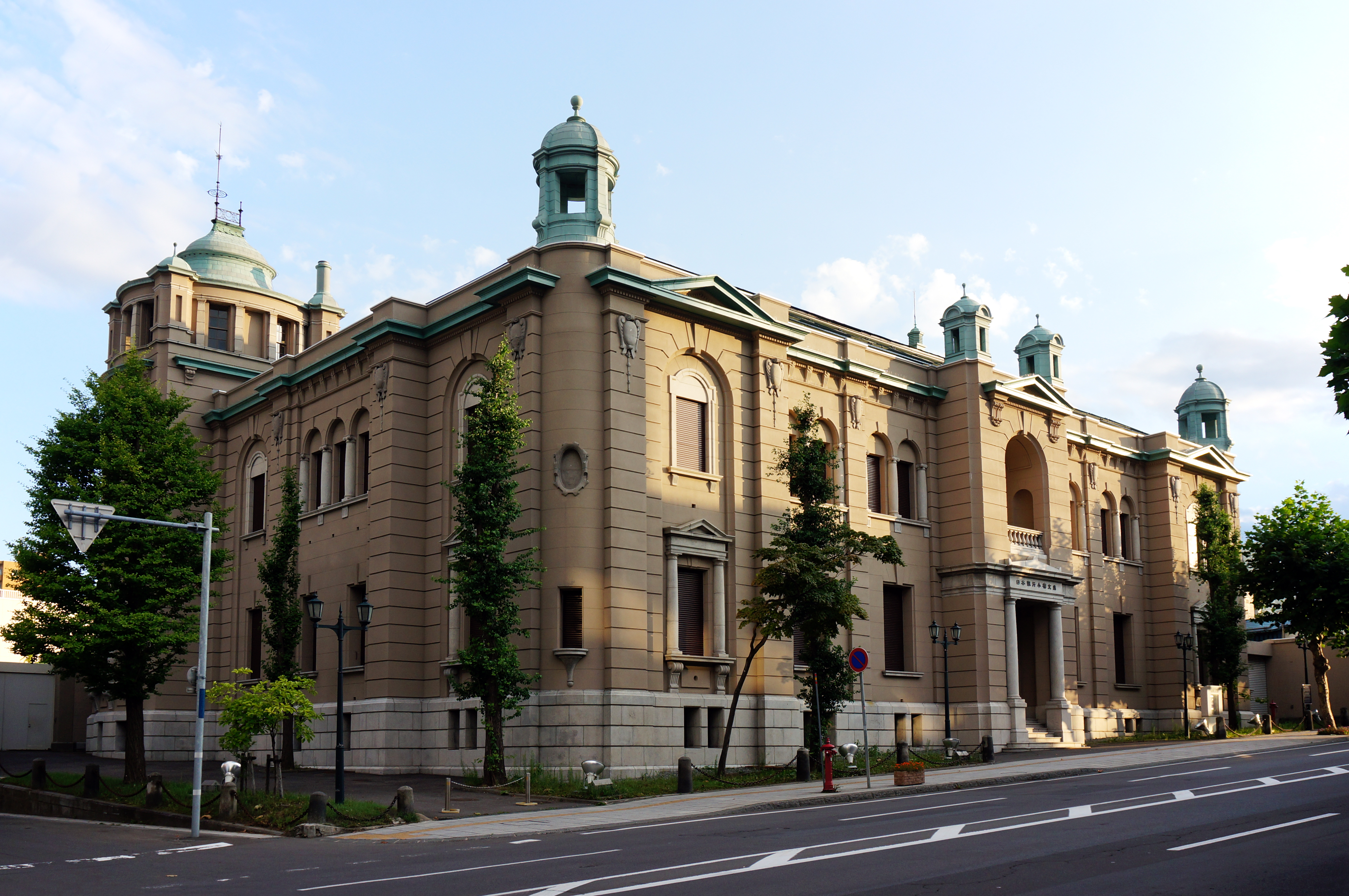
Former branch building in Otaru, Hokkaido, since 2003 the Bank of Japan Otaru Financial Museum

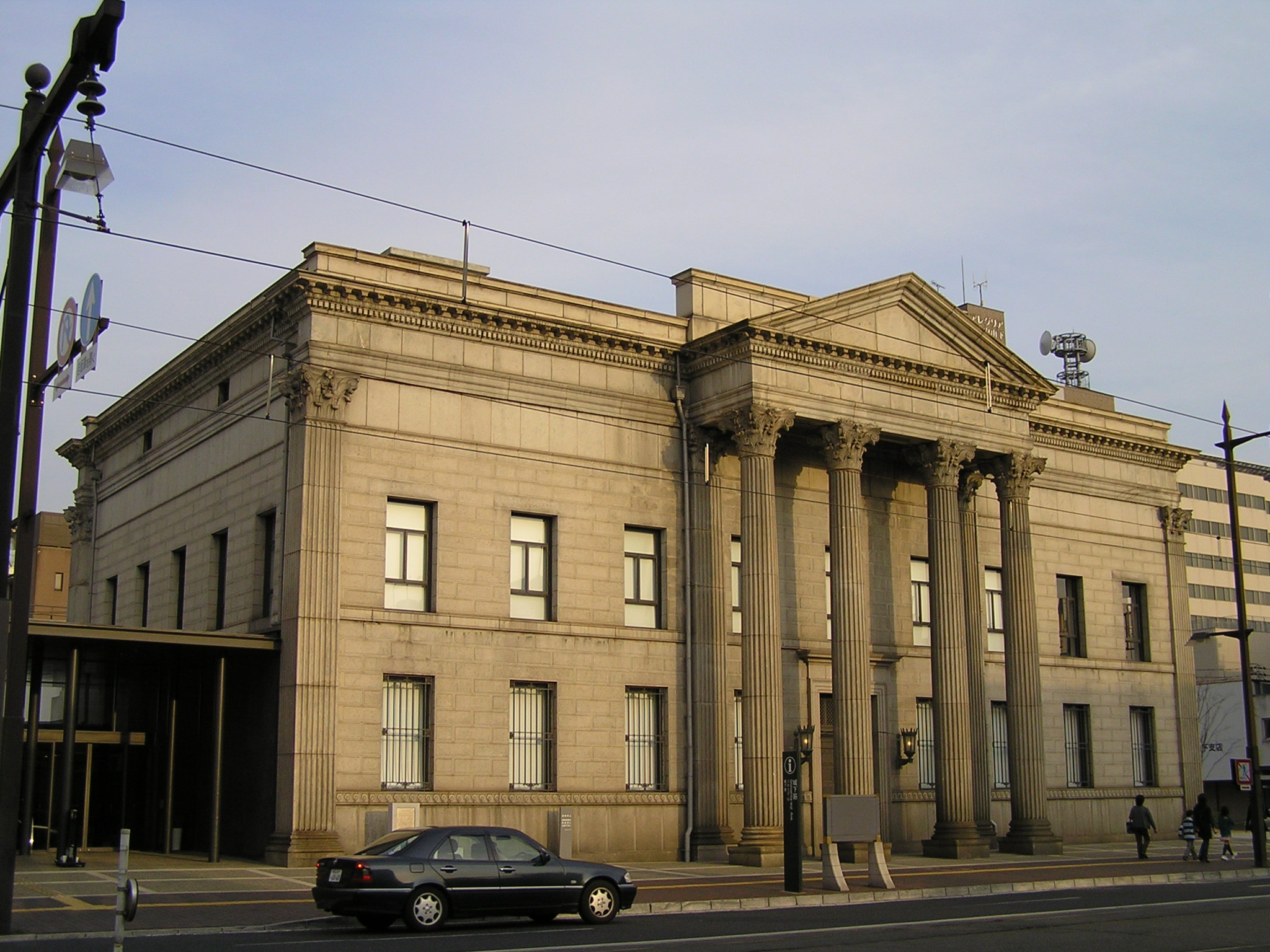
Former branch building in Okayama, since 2005 the Renaiss Hall cultural center

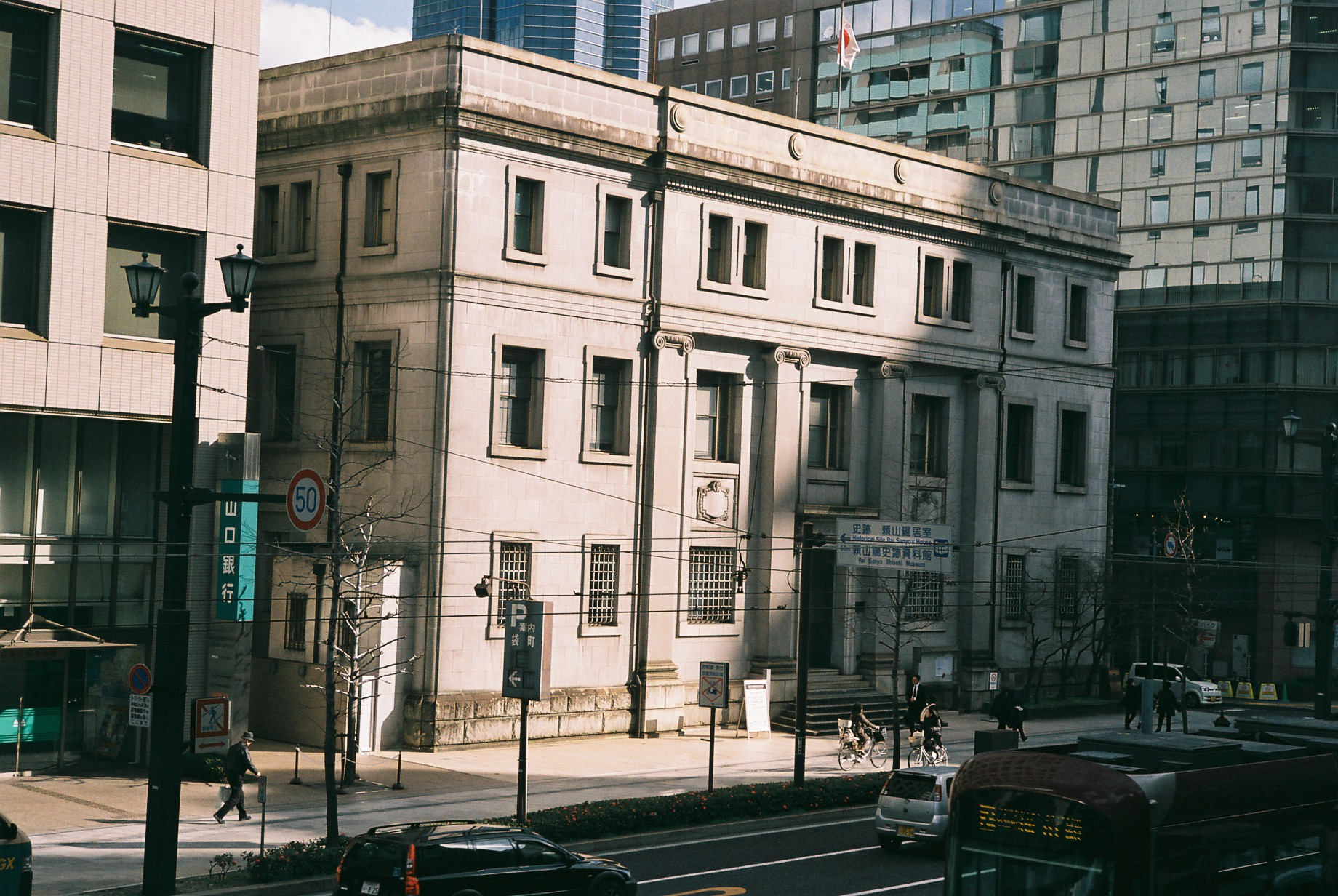
Former branch building in Hiroshima, transferred to municipal property in 2000

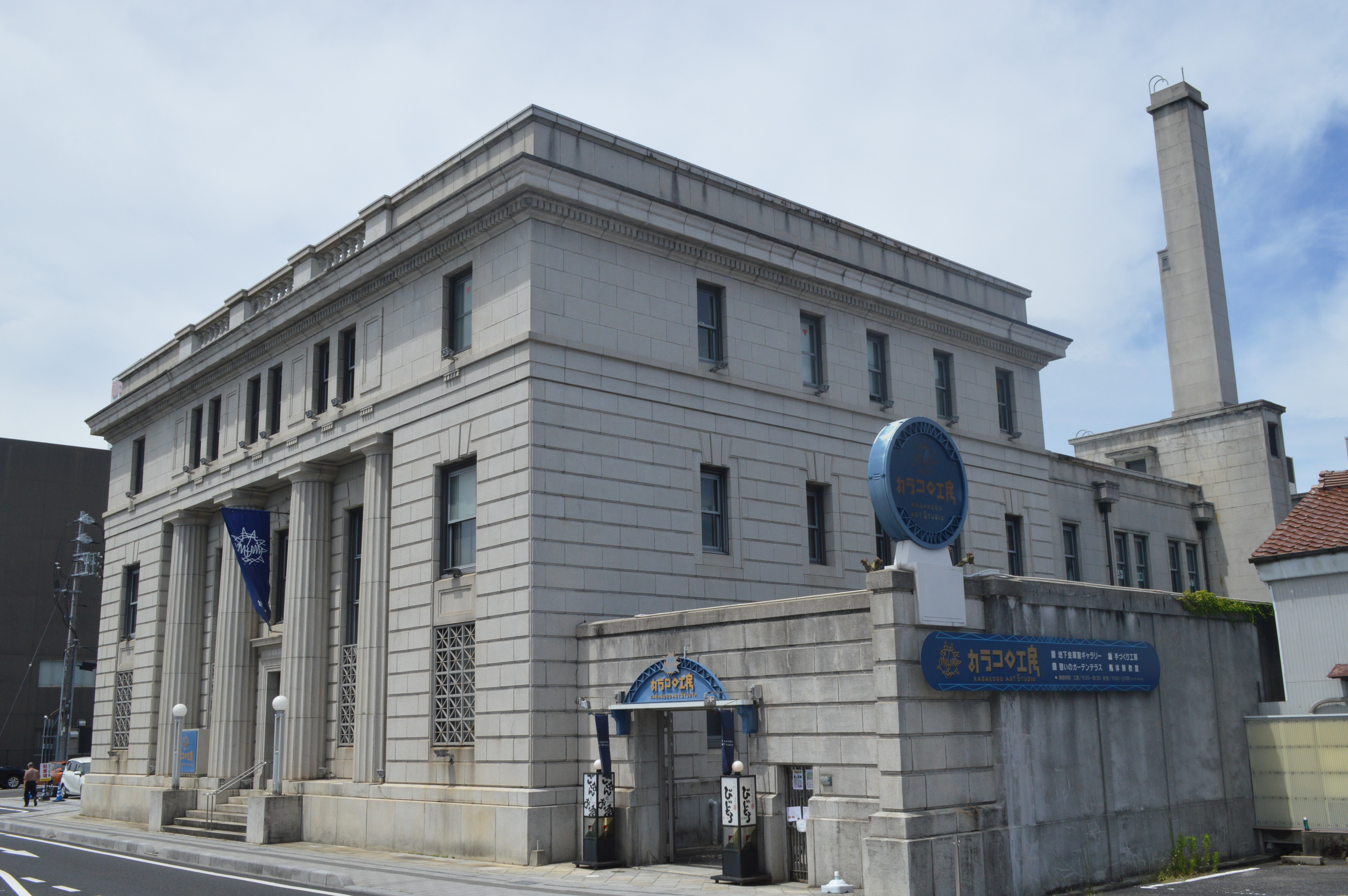
Former branch building in Matsue, since 2000 the Karakoro Art Workshop

== Leadership ==
Governor of the Bank of Japan
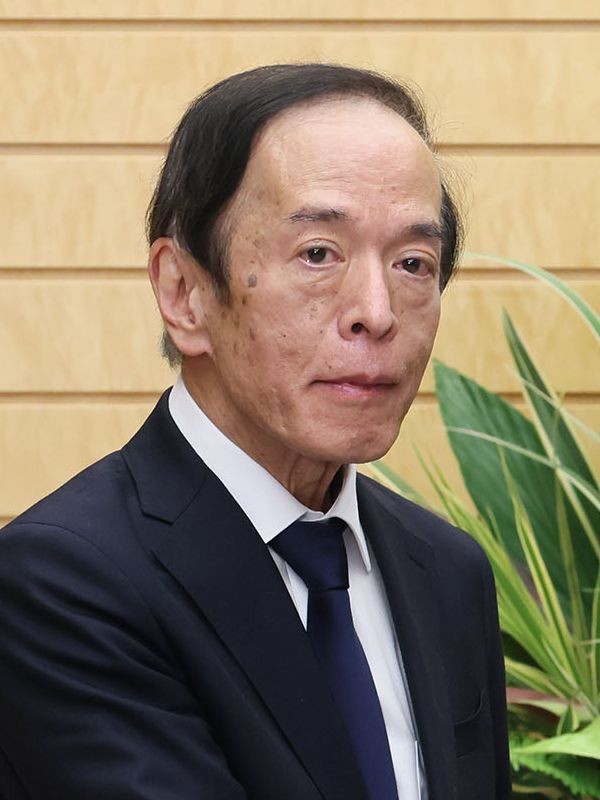
- Incumbent; Kazuo Ueda since 9 April 2023
- Style: His Excellency
- Appointer: The Prime Minister
- Term length: Five years
- Inaugural holder: Yoshihara Shigetoshi
- Formation: 6 October 1882

The governor of the Bank of Japan (総裁, sōsai) has considerable influence on the economic policy of the Japanese government.

=== List of governors ===
#	Governor	Took office	Left office	Previous jobs	Alma mater
1	Yoshihara Shigetoshi	6 October 1882	19 December 1887	bureaucrat, diplomat	Yale University
2	Tomita Tetsunosuke	21 February 1888	3 September 1889	bureaucrat, diplomat	Whitney Business College, Newark
3	Kawada Koichiro	3 September 1889	7 November 1896	Senior member of Mitsubishi	
4	Iwasaki Yanosuke	11 November 1896	20 October 1898	Head of Mitsubishi	Edward Hall's Family School for Boys
5	Tatsuo Yamamoto	20 October 1898	19 October 1903	central banker	Mitsubishi School of Commerce
6	Shigeyoshi Matsuo	20 October 1903	1 June 1911	bureaucrat	
7	Korekiyo Takahashi	1 June 1911	20 February 1913	bureaucrat	Meiji Gakuin
8	Yatarō Mishima	28 February 1913	7 March 1919	banker	University of Massachusetts Amherst
9	Junnosuke Inoue (First)	13 March 1919	2 September 1923	central banker	University of Tokyo
10	Otohiko Ichiki	5 September 1923	10 May 1927	bureaucrat (Ministry of Finance)	University of Tokyo
11	Junnosuke Inoue (Second)	10 May 1927	12 June 1928		
12	Hisaakira Hijikata	12 June 1928	4 June 1935	central banker	University of Tokyo
13	Eigo Fukai	4 June 1935	9 February 1937	businessman central banker	Doshisha
14	Seihin Ikeda	9 February 1937	27 July 1937	Head of Mitsui	Keio Gijuku Harvard University
15	Toyotaro Yuki	27 July 1937	18 March 1944	central banker	University of Tokyo
16	Keizo Shibusawa	18 March 1944	9 October 1945	banker	University of Tokyo
17	Eikichi Araki (First)	9 October 1945	1 June 1946	central banker	University of Tokyo
18	Hisato Ichimada	1 June 1946	10 December 1954	bureaucrat (Ministry of Finance)	University of Tokyo
19	Eikichi Araki (Second)	11 December 1954	30 November 1956		
20	Masamichi Yamagiwa	30 November 1956	17 December 1964	bureaucrat (Ministry of Finance)	University of Tokyo
21	Makoto Usami	17 December 1964	16 December 1969	banker (Mitsubishi bank)	Keio University
22	Tadashi Sasaki	17 December 1969	16 December 1974	central banker	University of Tokyo
23	Teiichiro Morinaga	17 December 1974	16 December 1979	bureaucrat (Ministry of Finance)	University of Tokyo
24	Haruo Maekawa	17 December 1979	16 December 1984	central banker	University of Tokyo
25	Satoshi Sumita	17 December 1984	16 December 1989	bureaucrat (Ministry of Finance)	University of Tokyo
26	Yasushi Mieno	17 December 1989	16 December 1994	central banker	University of Tokyo
27	Yasuo Matsushita	17 December 1994	20 March 1998	bureaucrat (Ministry of Finance)	University of Tokyo
28	Masaru Hayami	20 March 1998	19 March 2003	central banker	Hitotsubashi University
29	Toshihiko Fukui	20 March 2003	19 March 2008	central banker	University of Tokyo
30	Masaaki Shirakawa	9 April 2008	19 March 2013	central banker	University of Tokyo (B.A.) University of Chicago (M.A.)
31	Haruhiko Kuroda	20 March 2013	9 April 2023	bureaucrat (Ministry of Finance) President of ADB	University of Tokyo (B.A.) University of Oxford (MPhil)
32	Kazuo Ueda	9 April 2023	Incumbent	Economist at the University of Tokyo	University of Tokyo (B.S., B.A.) Massachusetts Institute of Technology (PhD)

=== Monetary Policy Board ===
As of 21 June 2026, the board responsible for setting monetary policy consisted of the following 9 members:

1. Kazuo Ueda, Governor of the BOJ
2. Uchida Shinichi, Deputy Governor of the BOJ
3. Himino Ryozo, Deputy Governor of the BOJ
4. Nakagawa Junko
5. Takata Hajime
6. Tamura Naoki
7. Koeda Junko
8. Masu Kazuyuki
9. Asada Toichiro

== See also ==
- Japanese yen
- Economy of Japan
- National Printing Bureau
- Japan Mint
- List of central banks
