= Makihara Satoru =

Japanese businessman

Makihara Satoru 槙原 覚
- Born: 1 March 1894; Empire of Japan
- Died: 8 May 1942 (aged 48); East China Sea
- Occupation: Industrialist

Makihara Satoru (槙原 覚) was a Japanese businessman in the period leading up to World War II.

== Early career ==
In 1922 he co-translated from German into Japanese the corporate management book Die Unternehmungsformen: mit Einschluß der Genossenschaften und der Sozialisierun by Robert Liefmann.

He was a rival of Takagaki Katsujirō, Mitsubishi's last president before the dissolution of the zaibatsu and first president after its reconstitution.

== Arrest in London ==
Having received a scholarship from Iwasaki Hisaya, eldest son of Mitsubishi Corporation's founder Iwasaki Yatarō, Makihara and his wife Haruko went to Hampstead, London in 1927 as head of the Mitsubishi Shoji Kaisha office. Their only child, a son Minoru Makihara was born there in 1930. After some time elsewhere they returned to London in 1937.

On Friday 2 August 1940, Makihara and several others were arrested on suspicion of espionage, and taken to Brixton Prison. Thanks to intervention by the Japanophile (and pro-Japanese spy) Lord Sempill and others, he was released a few days later, on Monday 5 August, due to "insufficient evidence".

== Return to Japan and death ==
Mitsubishi closed their London office in October 1940, whereupon Makihara returned to Tokyo, becoming General Manager of the company's Marine Products Division.

In May 1942, he was ordered by the military to travel to Japan's colonies in southeast Asia to aid in reconstruction. While en route, their ship Taiyō Maru was torpedoed (on 8 May 1942) by USS Grenadier near the Danjo islands to the west of Kyūshū, with 800 deaths including Makihara. Many colleagues contributed to a book of reminiscences.

== Family ==
His wife and son were allowed to live in the Kokubunji villa of Iwasaki Hikoyata, eldest son of Hisaya, partly also helped by the fact that Minoru and Hikoyata's son Iwasaki Hiroya had been friends at school. The main building was requisitioned to become the headquarters of the Anglican Church in Japan, and there Minoru met Bishop Kenneth Bayer from Harvard University. As Minoru had twice won the General MacArthur English Speech Contest, Bayer introduced him to St. Paul's School (Concord, New Hampshire), from where he progressed to Harvard. He later went on to become president and chair of Mitsubishi, and married Kikuko, daughter of Hisaya's son Iwasaki Takaya.
