= Kawada Koichiro =

Japanese banker (1836–1896)

Baron Kawada Koichiro 川田小一郎

3rd Governor of the Bank of Japan
- In office September 3, 1889 – November 7, 1896
- Monarch: Meiji
- Prime Minister: Kuroda Kiyotaka; Sanjō Sanetomi; Yamagata Aritomo; Matsukata Masayoshi; Itō Hirobumi
- Preceded by: Tomita Tetsunosuke
- Succeeded by: Iwasaki Yanosuke

Kawada Koichirō (川田 小一郎; October 4, 1836 – November 7, 1896) was a Japanese businessman, central banker and the 3rd Governor of the Bank of Japan (BOJ). He was created a Baron; and he was a member of Japan's House of Peers.

== Early life ==
Kawada was born in Kōchi Prefecture.

== Career ==
Kawada's career was closely associated with Iwasaki Yatarō, the founder of Mitsubishi; and he was a key figure in the development of Mitsubishi's management structure. He also played a key role in the early years of Nippon Yusen (NYK).

Kawada was Governor of the Bank of Japan from September 3, 1889 – November 7, 1896.

== Notes ==
Government offices
Preceded by Tomita Tetsunosuke	Governor of the Bank of Japan; 1889–1896	Succeeded by Iwasaki Yanosuke
