= Hisaya Iwasaki =

Japanese industrialist (1865–1955)

Baron Hisaya Iwasaki
- 岩崎久弥
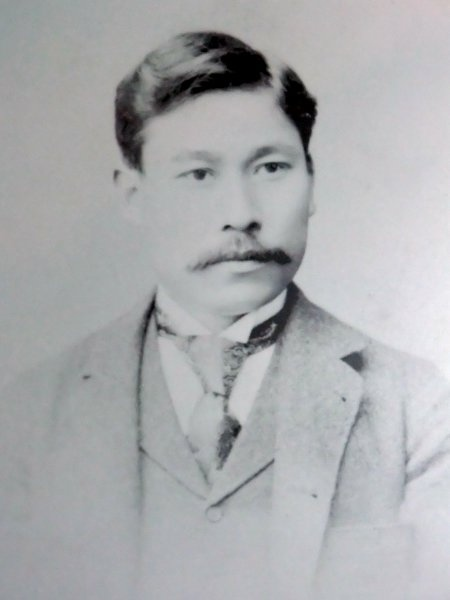
- Born: October 14, 1865; Inokuchi, Aki, Tosa Province (Aki, Kōchi)
- Resting place: Iwasaki Mausoleum, Setagaya, Tokyo
- Education: University of Pennsylvania
- Title: 3rd President of Mitsubishi; Senior Fourth Rank
- Term: 1893–1916
- Predecessor: Yanosuke Iwasaki
- Successor: Koyata Iwasaki
- Parents: Yataro Iwasaki (father); Kise Iwasaki (mother)
- Relatives: Miki Sawada
- Family: Iwasaki

Baron Hisaya Iwasaki was a 19th- and 20th-century Japanese industrialist who served as the third head of the unified Mitsubishi.

== Life ==
The eldest son of the founder Yataro and his wife Kise, he was born in an area now called Aki, Kochi, on 14 October 1865. He matriculated at the University of Pennsylvania in 1886 and, after earning his Bachelor of Science degree, returned to Japan in 1891. He succeeded his uncle Yanosuke as head of Mitsubishi in 1894 and remained in this role until 1916, when he was succeeded by his cousin Koyata. His notable achievements as head of Mitsubishi include the modernisation of the Nagasaki shipyard and the development of Marunouchi as a modern business district.

As a philanthropist, he established the Oriental Library, which is still an influential hub for Asian studies. He also donated Kiyosumi Gardens and Rikugien Gardens to the City of Tokyo. His former residence near Ueno Park is now open to the public as Kyū-Iwasaki-tei Garden. The Max Müller Collection at the University of Tokyo was also a gift from him.

He married Shizuko, the daughter of Viscount Masaari Hoshina, 10th head of the Iino domain. He died at the age of 90 on 2 December 1955.
