= Tōyō Bunko =

Coordinates: 35°43′53″N 139°44′55″E

Oriental Library, Tōyō Bunko
- 東洋文庫
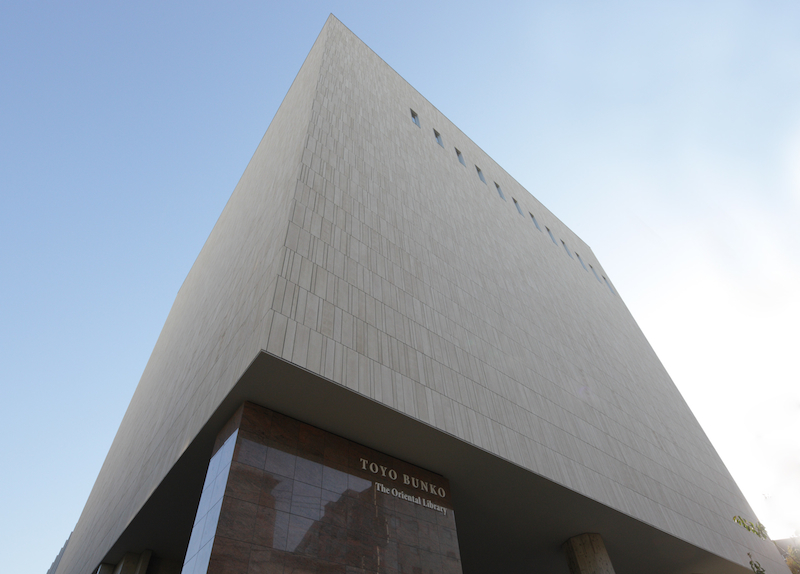
- The Tōyō Bunko building since 2011
- Established: 1992 (Setagaya); 2022 (Chiyoda)
- Location: Honkomagome, Bunkyō, Tokyo, Japan
- Type: Art museum, Library
- Collection size: Morrison collection
- Visitors: 47,514
- Director: Yoshinobu Shiba
- Website: http://www.toyo-bunko.or.jp/museum/museum_eindex.php

The Tōyō Bunko (東洋文庫), or Oriental Library, is Japan's largest Asian studies library and one of the world's five largest, located in Tokyo. It also functions as a research institute dedicated to the study of Asian history and culture. It has greatly contributed to the development of Asian Studies through the acquisition of books and other source materials as well as the publication of research by Japanese scholars. Presently, the library contains approximately 950,000 volumes which are cataloged linguistically according to Asian, Western and Japanese language materials.

== History ==
=== Establishment and the early history ===
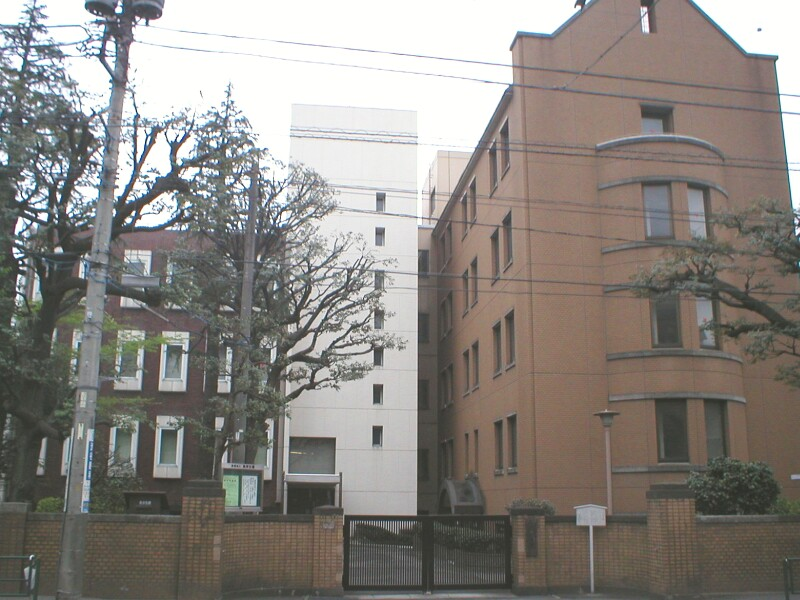
The old Toyo Bunko building

The Oriental Library had its beginnings in 1917 when Hisaya Iwasaki, former third President of the Mitsubishi Company, purchased the vast private collection of China-related publications of Australian adventurer, journalist, and Republic of China government adviser George Morrison. After the purchase, he improved the collection by increasing the number of classical Chinese, Japanese, and Western language books by receiving advice from a bibliographer, Tsunashirō Wada.

He established Tōyō Bunko in 1924 to promote oriental studies. It was the first library institution in Japan that was devoted exclusively to oriental studies. Junnosuke Inoue was invited as the first Director of this Library. Hisaya Iwasaki stopped touching management after establishment, but continued financial support to promote collection and research.

=== After the War ===
After the Pacific War, GHQ dismantled Zaibatsu, because Zaibatsu were responsible for the War. Hisaya Iwasaki resigned from all of his posts in the Mitsubishi Group, and he moved into his cottage. Therefore, the Oriental Library lost its patron and faced a financial crisis. Kijūrō Shidehara, former prime minister, took up this problem to National Diet, and the library became a branch of the National Diet Library in 1948.

From 1961, the library was a UNESCO affiliated organization as the Centre for East Asian Cultural Studies. Also, in 1994 a center was set up within the library to provide research facilities for scholars dispatched from France.

== Organization ==
Major decisions concerning the management of the library are made by its Advisory Council and Board of Directors. Daily operations are supervised by the Committee of Department heads. As of 2007, the library was staffed by 20 full-time employees working under the supervision of the Director General Makihara Minoru, and Executive Director Yamakawa Naoyoshi. In addition, there were over 200 research fellows participating in Toyo Bunko-sponsored projects.

== Directors ==
1. Junnosuke Inoue (1924-)
2. Shuichi Kirishima (1932-)
3. Hayashi Gonsuke (1932-)
4. Shiratori Kurakichi (1939-)
5. Akira Shimizu (1939-)
6. Kijūrō Shidehara (1947-)
7. Moritatsu Hosokawa (1951-)
8. Naoshirō Tsuji (1974-)
9. Kazuo Enoki (1985-)
10. Kitamura Hajime (1990-)
11. Yoshinobu Shiba (2001-)
12. Minoru Makihara (2007-)
13. Nobuo Kuroyanagi (2021-)

== See also ==
- Mitsubishi Group
- List of National Treasures of Japan (writings)
