= Rikugi-en Gardens =

Metropolitan park in Tokyo, Japan

Coordinates: 35°43′59″N 139°44′48″E

Rikugi-en
- 六義園
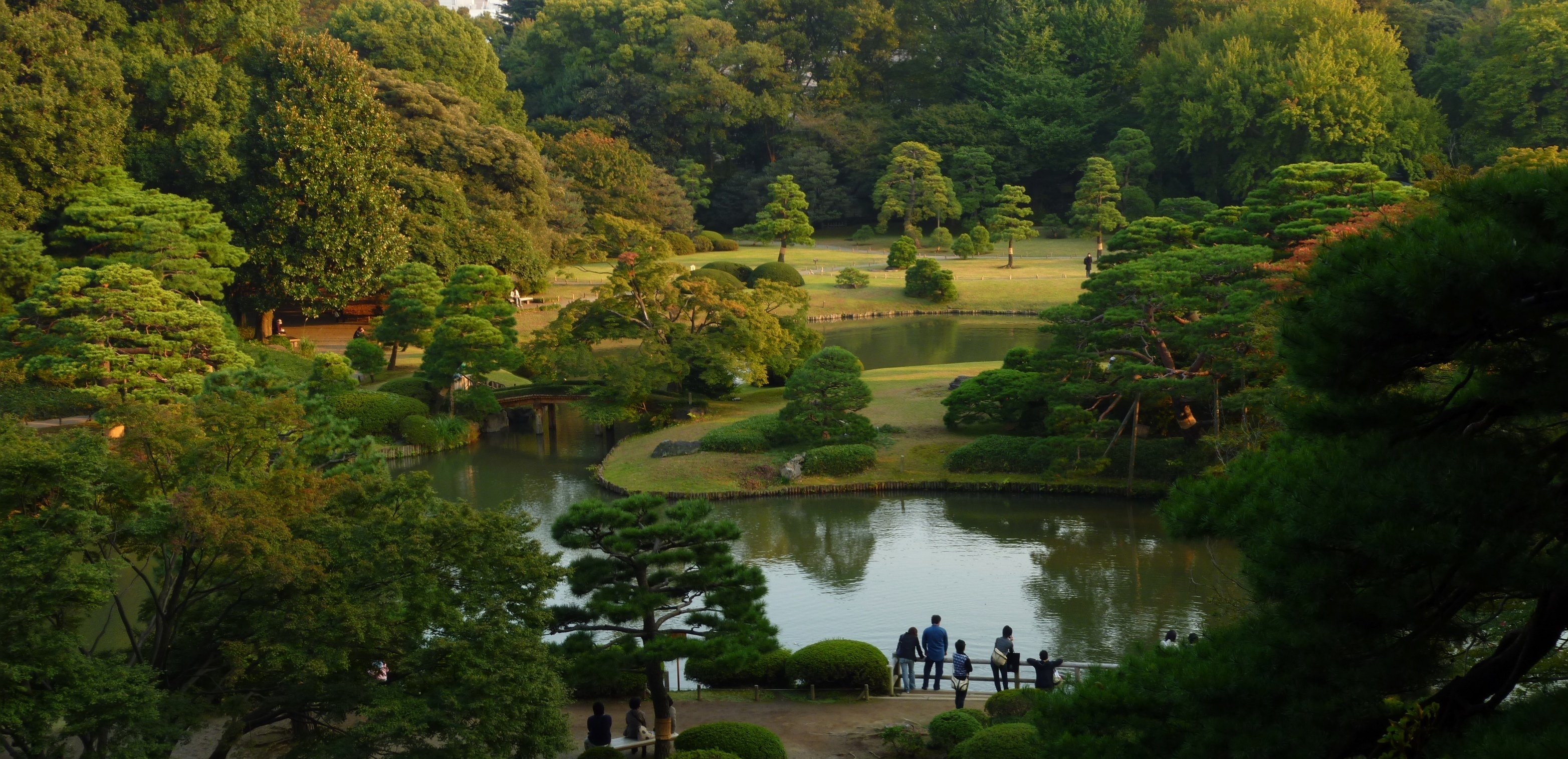
- A view of Rikugi-en from Fujishiro-toge hill
- Interactive map of Rikugi-en
- Location: Bunkyo-ku, Tokyo
- Area: 87,809.41 m^{2} (945,172.6 sq ft)
- Created: 1938
- Operator: Tokyo metropolitan parks
- Parking: None
- Public transit: Komagome Station
- Website: Official website (in Japanese)

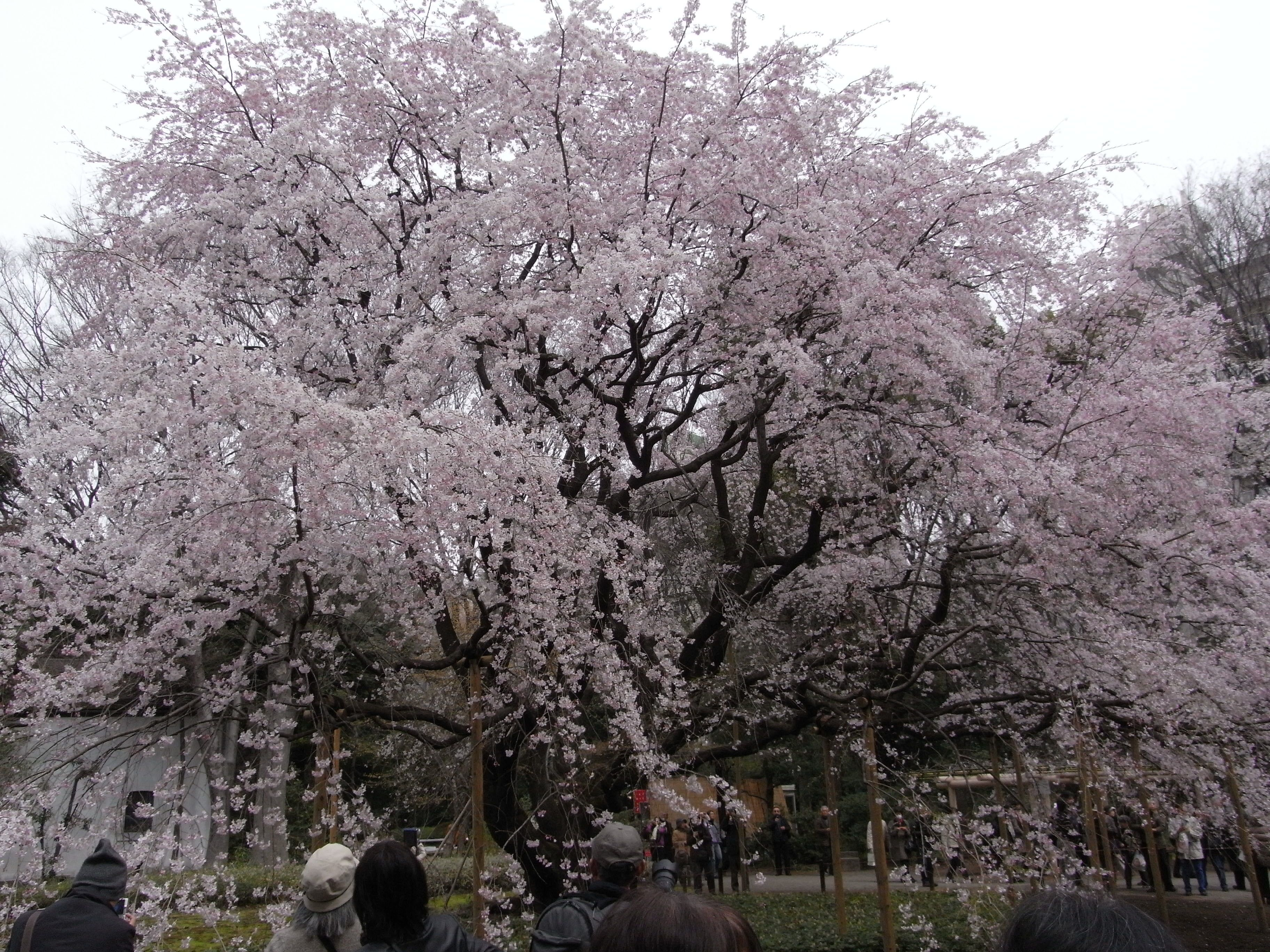

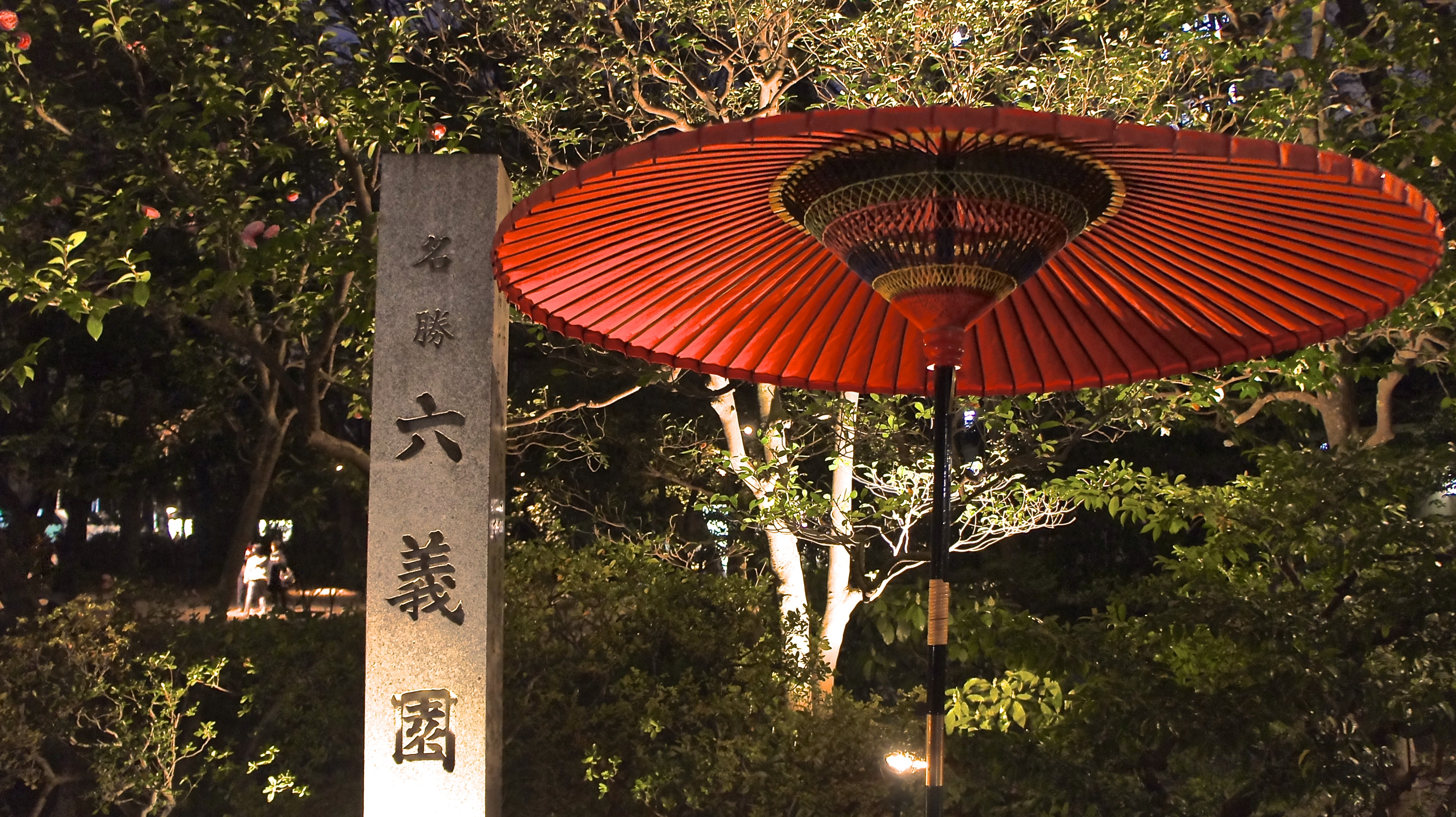

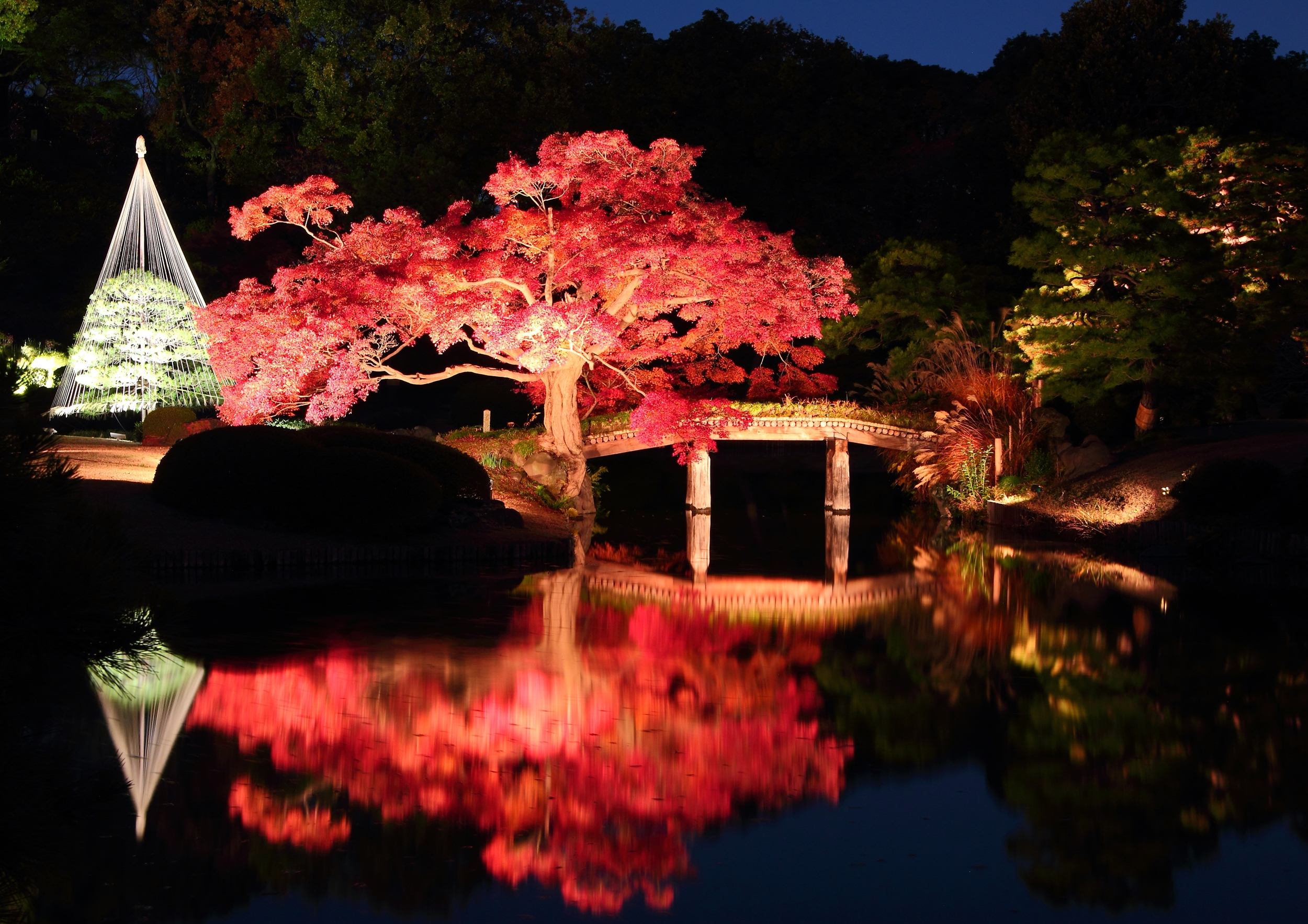

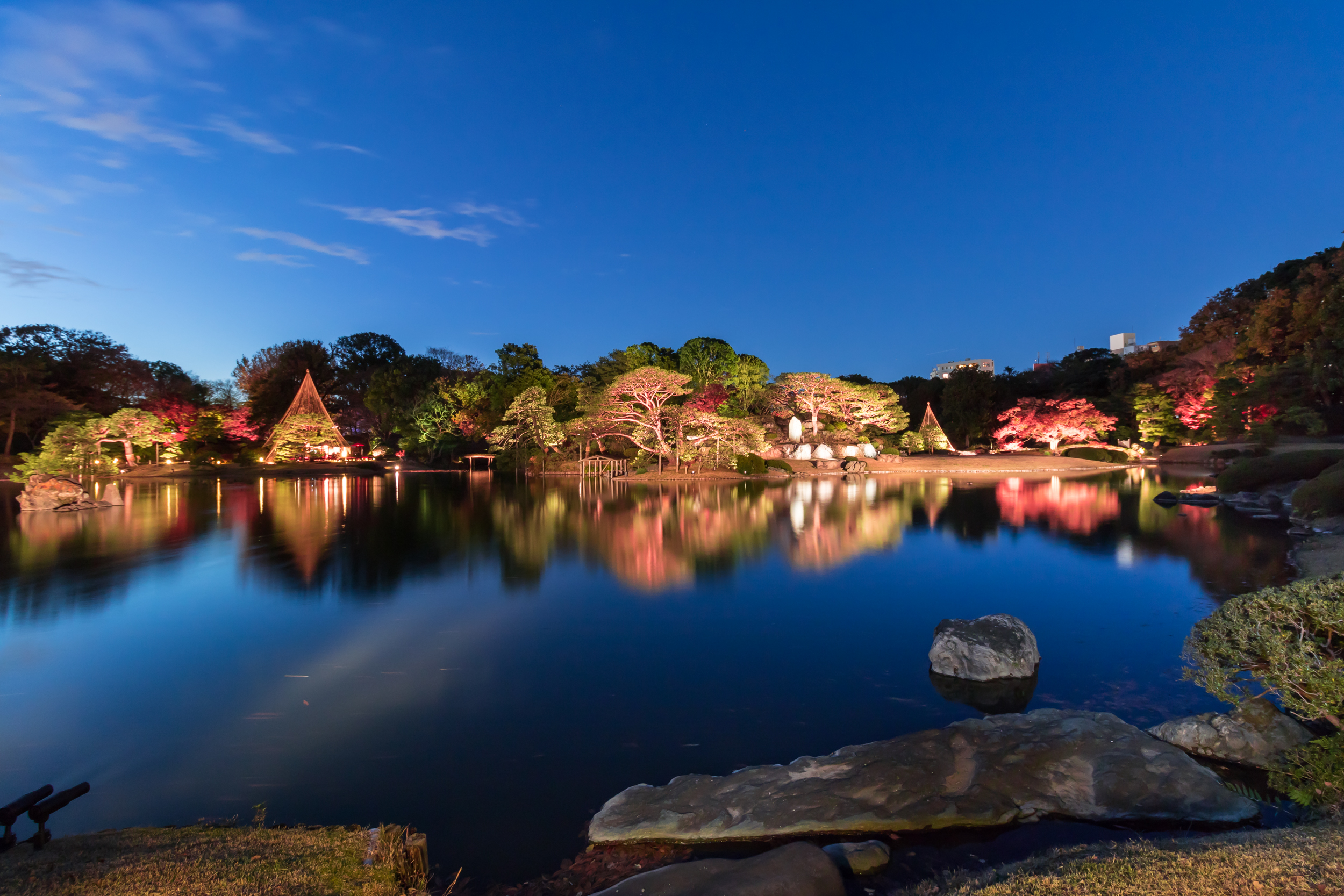

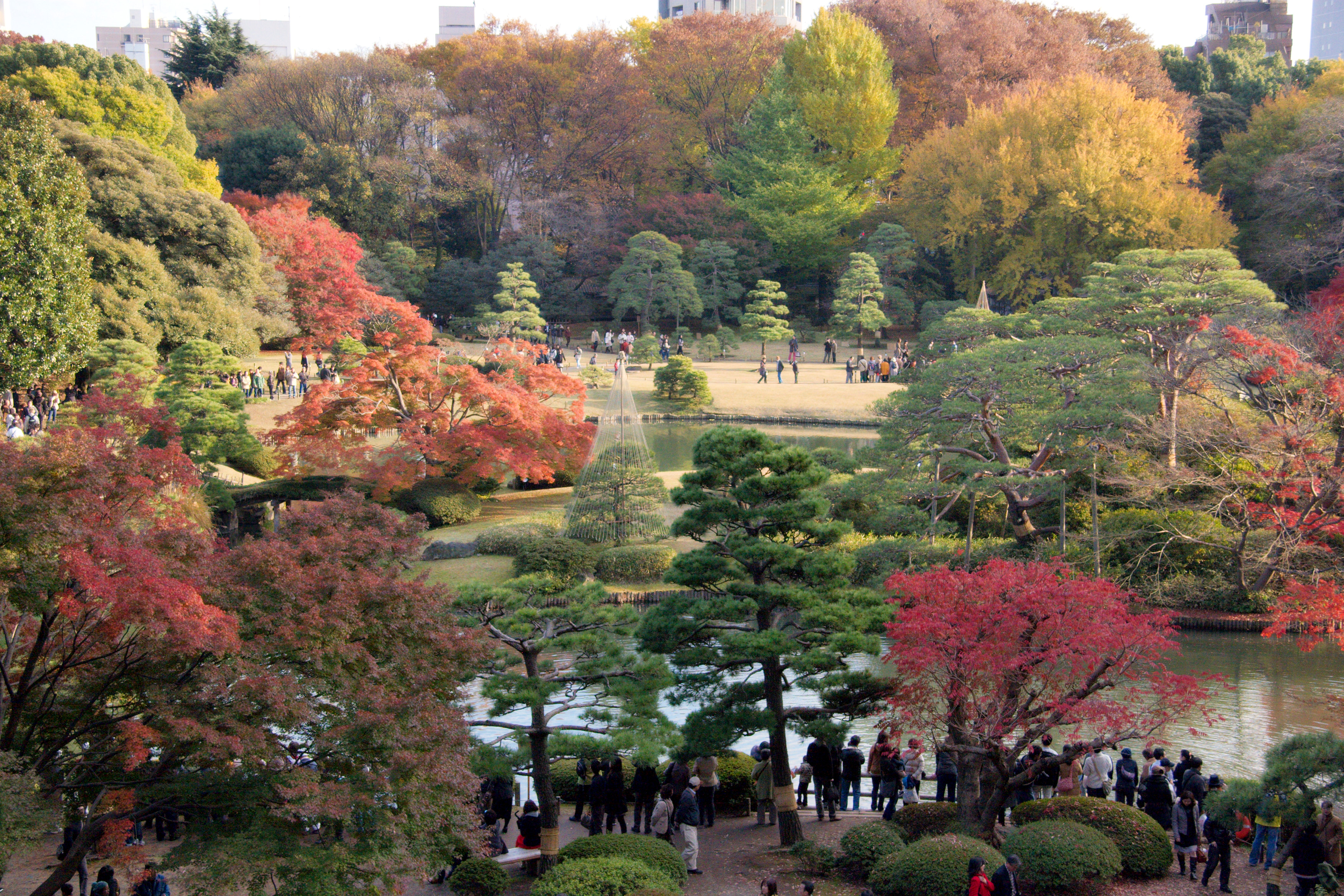

Rikugi-en (六義園) is a metropolitan park in Bunkyō-ku, Tokyo, Japan. The name Rikugi-en means "garden of six principles", referring to the six elements in waka poetry, based on the traditional division of Chinese poetry into six categories. The gardens consist of a small pond, trees, and a hill.

== History ==
The construction of the gardens took place between 1695 and 1702, and was headed by Yanagisawa Yoshiyasu by permission of the fifth Tokugawa shōgun Tokugawa Tsunayoshi. It is a typical example of a daimyo garden from the Edo period. After the death of Yanagisawa, it was neglected. The founder of Mitsubishi, Iwasaki Yatarō, bought the gardens in 1878 and began to restore it. This was continued by his younger brother and successor, Iwasaki Yanosuke. The gardens today are about one-third of their original size. In 1938, they were donated to the Tokyo City government. They were specified as a special place of scenic beauty (特別名勝, tokubetsu meishō) by the Japanese government in 1953.

== Access ==
The gardens are open from 9 a.m. to 5 p.m. They are a short walk from Komagome Station on the JR Yamanote line and the Tokyo Metro Namboku Line. There are no parking lots.

General admission (junior high school and above) is 300 yen. People over 65 pay 150 yen, and students under junior high school age (and junior high school students living or studying in the Tokyo metropolitan area) may enter for free.

== Illuminations ==
For short periods during spring and autumn the cherry blossoms and autumn foliage respectively are temporarily lit up and the gardens remain open until 9 p.m.

== See also ==
- List of Special Places of Scenic Beauty, Special Historic Sites and Special Natural Monuments

== Bibliography ==
- Mansfield, Stephen (2011). Japan's Master Gardens - Lessons in Space and Environment (Hardback). Tokyo, Rutland, Singapore: Tuttle. ISBN 978-4-8053-1128-8.
