= Leoc =

Leoc or LEOC may refer to:

- Late entry officer course at the Royal Military Academy Sandhurst
- LEOC Japan, a Japanese catering service company
