= Minoru Makihara =

Japanese business executive (1930–2020)

- Born: January 12, 1930; London, United Kingdom
- Died: December 13, 2020 (aged 90); Tokyo, Japan
- Occupation: Business executive
- Known for: Leading Mitsubishi group's turnaround in the 1990s; leading US–Japan business relations.
- Spouse: Kikuko Iwasaki (m. 1957)
- Children: 2

Minoru Makihara (Japanese: 槙原稔 Makihara Minoru; January 12, 1930 – December 13, 2020) was a Japanese business executive who was the chief executive (1992–1998) and chairman (1998–2004) of Mitsubishi Corporation. He was noted for steering the group through the turbulent economic times of the 1990s and for advocating strong US–Japan business relations, serving on many trade and cultural relations advocacy groups.

== Early life and education ==
Makihara was born in London on January 12, 1930, to Haruko and Satoru Makihara. His father was a Mitsubishi executive there, and his mother was a kindergarten teacher, librarian, and writer. The family moved back to Japan just before the Second World War, when tensions between Japan and the western countries were rising, and he attended Seikei Elementary School in Tokyo. His father died in 1942, when the ship that he had taken to the then-Japanese-occupied Philippines, as part of a business delegation, was attacked by an American submarine.

In 1949, he went to the United States to study at a private boarding school, St Paul's School in New Hampshire, and then attended Harvard University from 1950, graduating with a bachelor's degree in government studies in 1954. During his time at Harvard, his roommate was Robert Monks, a shareholder activist who was noted to have forced Sears Holdings to sell most of its diversified business interests and focus on retailing. Many years later, Makihara would credit his association with Monks for some of his portfolio returns and return on equity-focused reforms that he would initiate at Mitsubishi during his tenure as its chief executive. Some of the other notable students in his graduating class included future senator Edward Kennedy, and author John Updike. He was a member of the Phi Beta Kappa during his time at Harvard.

== Career ==
=== Early years ===
After completing his studies in the United States, Makihara returned to Japan in 1956, and joined Mitsubishi. He split his time between Japan and the United States, and returned to open the group's office in Washington, D.C., in 1971. During this time, he became acquainted with a number of notable figures, including Katharine Graham, owner of The Washington Post. He returned to Japan in the late 1970s, to lead the marine products group that his father had once headed, focusing on exports of salmon and crab. In 1987, he became the group's head of international operations; in this role, he spent time in London, New York, Seattle, and Washington, D.C., and was noted for his cosmopolitan and international outlook. Outside Japan, during this period, he was known as Ben Makihara. He was made the president and chief executive of the group in 1992.

=== Reforms at Mitsubishi ===
When Makihara took over as the chief executive, the Mitsubishi group was already Japan's largest trading company. However, the Japanese economy had just entered an economic recession, and the company had an unfavorable financial status, with high debts, low profits and an inward-facing management culture; US–Japan relations were then at an all-time low. Makihara was tasked with turning the organization around.

He spoke against the closed nature of the Keiretsu, a Japanese corporate structure representing companies with interlocking business relationships and shareholdings, and emphasizing the need for more transparency. During this period, the group had interests ranging from fine art to aircraft jet engines. Makihara noted that companies in the earlier decade were fueled by the easy money supply bubble in the 1980s, resorting to debt-fueled growth, rather than issuing new equity or focusing on return on equity, resulting in an accumulation of bad debts. His reforms at the group included financial management to recognize portfolio losses and writing off bad investments, engineering cultural and organizational changes at the company to change the corporate mindset from a Japanese trading company to a global conglomerate, and reorienting the business with western corporate principles toward a focus on returns on equity and creation of stakeholder value. The reforms were not without resistance. He was referred to as "the alien," referring to his time spent internationally, and one of his challenges was to convince both employees and the Japanese press of his Japanese credentials. During this time, with revenues of US $176 bn (1996), the group was the world's largest corporation by revenues, and operated in over 87 countries, with diverse interests including energy exploration, minerals, chemicals, automobiles, imaging, to information systems.

He became the group's chairman in 1998 and served in that position until 2004. During this time he engineered a partnership between Mitsubishi motors and the German automobile maker, Daimler Chrysler.

=== Trade advocacy ===
He was an advocate for strong US–Japan business relations, through a period in which many Americans viewed Japanese resurgence as a threat to their own economic and global trade domination. He chaired the US–Japan Business Council (1997–2002) and the US–Japan Conference on Cultural and Educational Interchange (2008–2014). He served on the board of the American multinational technology company IBM. He was the vice chairman of Keidanren, the Japan Business Federation, and was a member of the Trilateral Commission, a non-governmental policy coordination group established to foster cooperation between Japan, Europe, and North America.

== Personal life ==
In 1957, Makihara married Kikuko Iwasaki, a childhood friend who was the great-granddaughter of the Mitsubishi Group's founder, Yataro Iwasaki. They had two children, a son and a daughter.

Makihara died on December 13, 2020, of heart failure in Tokyo. He was aged 90.
