= Makihara =

Makihara (written: 槇原 or 槙原) is a Japanese surname. Notable people with the surname include:

- Hiromi Makihara (槙原 寛己, born 1963), Japanese baseball player
- Minoru Makihara (槙原 稔, 1930–2020), Japanese business executive
- Noriyuki Makihara (槇原 敬之, born 1969), Japanese singer-songwriter
