= Meiwa (disambiguation) =

Meiwa is a Japanese era name from 1764 through 1772.

Meiwa may also refer to:

- Meiwa, Gunma, a town in Gunma Prefecture, Japan
- Meiwa, Mie, a town in Mie Prefecture, Japan
- Meiwa Corp., a trading company in Japan
- Meiwa Gakuen Junior College, a private junior college in Japan
