= Mitsubishi Logistics =

Japanese logistics company

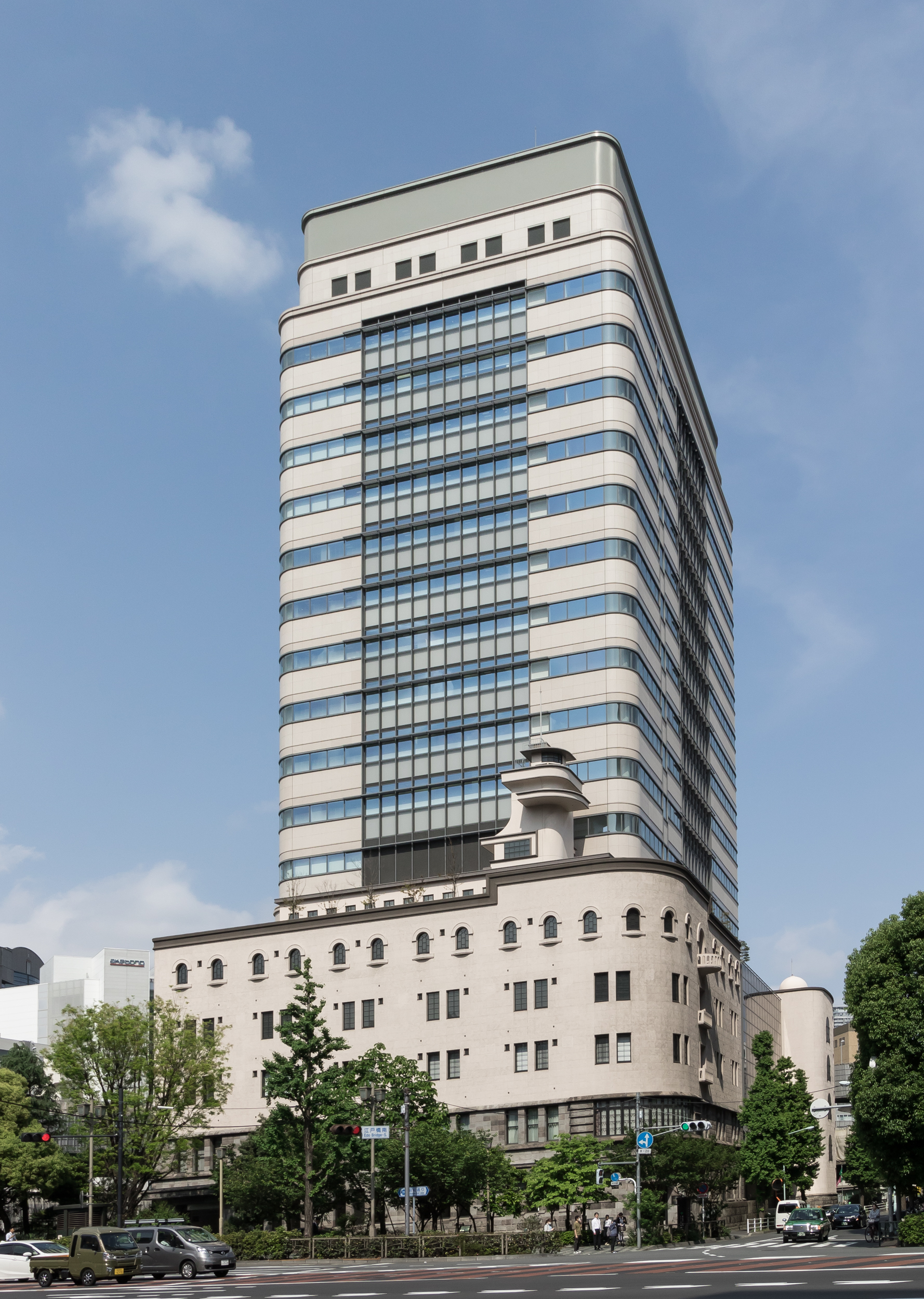
Headquarters in Nihonbashi, Tokyo

Mitsubishi Logistics, Inc. (Mitsubishi Soko, 三菱倉庫) is a logistics company with its headquarters in Nihonbashi, Chuo, Tokyo. It is a member of the Mitsubishi group and a participant of Mitsubishi Kinyokai and Mitsubishi Public Affairs Committee.

== History ==
Since its predecessor, Tokyo Logistics, was founded in 1887 and changed the corporate name to its current one in 1918, Mitsubishi Logistics reached its 120th anniversary in 2007. Among the Mitsubishi zaibatsu, the foundation of Mitsubishi Logistics followed the establishment of NYK line, Mitsubishi Corporation, Mitsubishi Heavy Industries, and Mitsubishi Bank (what is now Mitsubishi UFJ Financial Group after several mergers).

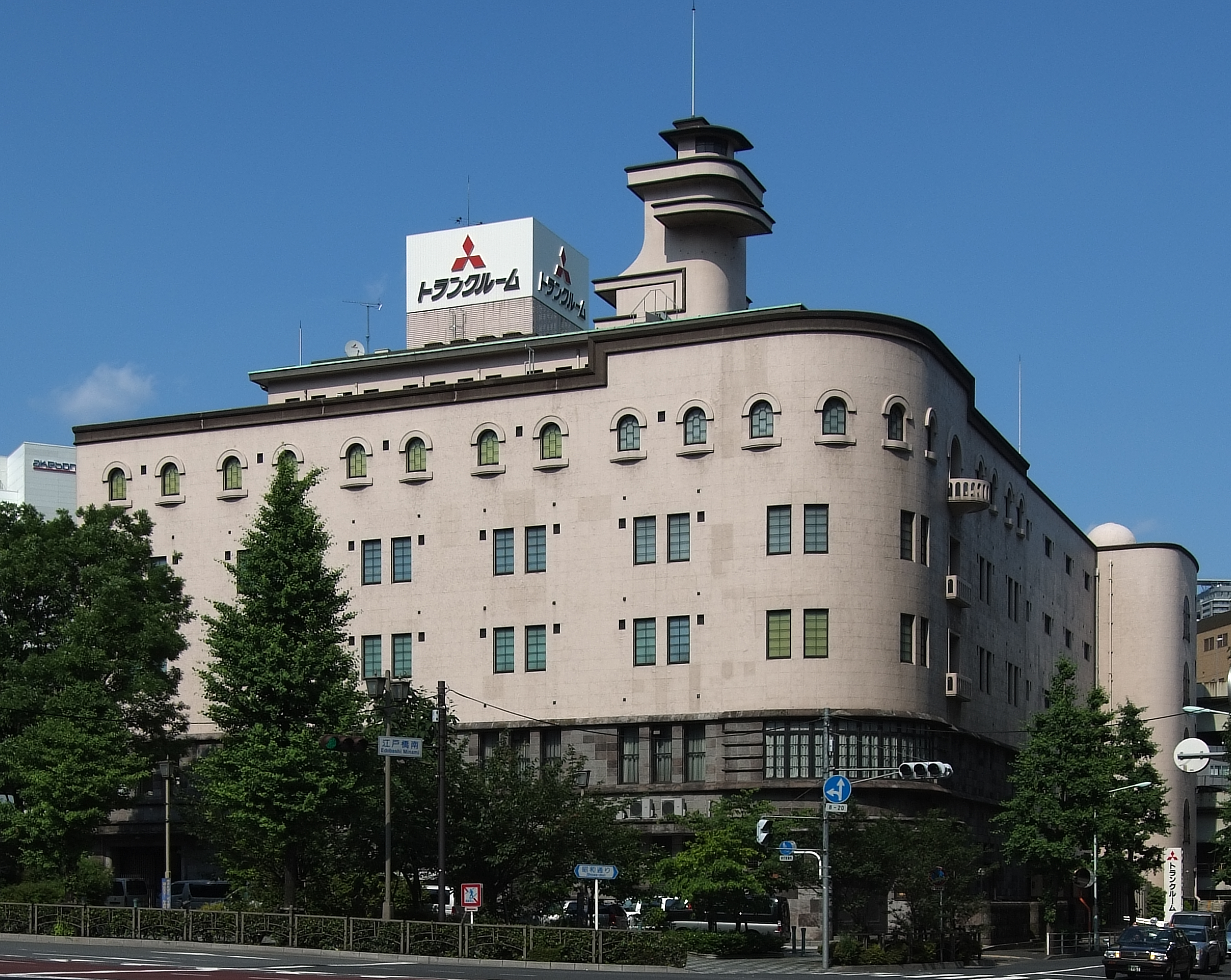
The Nihonbashi headquarters in 2009, before the renovation

The company's central office building was planned in the aftermath of the Great Kanto Earthquake and completed in 1930. The term 'trunk room' is said to have been conceived to advertise this new building, which stored precious pieces of art and expensive kimono. A renovation project began in 2010, involving the partial replacement of the structure with a 90-metre modern office building designed to match, alongside reinforcement of the remaining original structure. The renovation was completed in 2014.

== Services ==
Mitsubishi Logistics' business can be categorized into two areas; logistics and real estate. The company's main businesses are in warehouse management, seaport logistics, and real estate.

The company's logistics business has a history of 120 years and owns affiliate companies throughout the world. Its performance ranks at the top among Japan's logistics industry. Mitsubishi Logistics possesses Japan's largest warehouse. It works closely with its subsidiaries abroad and has a good track record in handling pharmaceuticals and chemicals. It owns 63,000-ton refrigerated warehouses, one in eastern Japan and another in western, namely Oi in Tokyo and Rokkō Island in Kobe.

Mitsubishi Logistics is profitable in real estate business too and actively invests in office and commercial buildings and residential houses. It develops many "datacenter-compatible buildings" such as Tokyo Dia Building, and is a pioneer and holds the largest domestic market share in buildings for rent with emergency generators, high earthquake resistance, and multi-carrier systems (Tokyo Dia Building is the largest seismically isolated building in Japan). With regard to commercial facilities, the company developed Kobe Harbor Land for example, a commercial complex in western Japan. Eastern Japan saw the opening of Yokohama Bay Quarter outside the eastern gate of Yokohama Station on August 24, 2006. Mitsubishi Logistics is also undertaking development of condominiums including Nabeaure Yokohama Tower Residence and M. M. Towers Foresis.

== Yokohama Dia Building ==
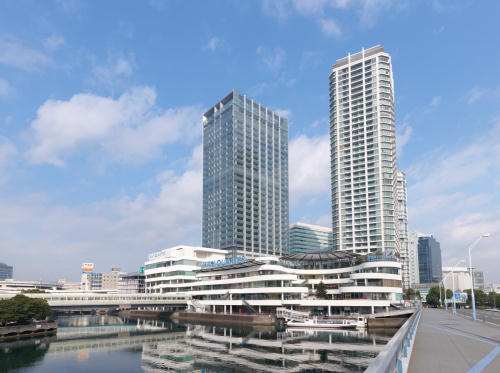
Yokohama Dia Building is one of the largest office buildings in the area.

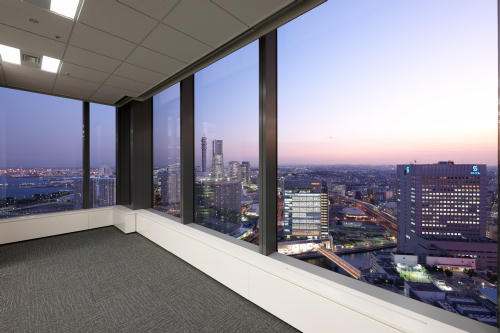
The middle to upper floors of the building are designated rental office space.

To mark the end of its site redevelopment project outside Yokohama Station, on December 16, 2009, the company completed its construction of Yokohama Dia Building, which was among the largest buildings in the area and had a unique appearance of uniform design and glass curtain walls. Yokohama Dia Building is 31 stories high, 2 stories deep and has a 2-story-high penthouse. It measures 157.7 meters in height (which is the third tallest after Landmark Tower and Queens Tower (A) in Yokohama) and has an area size of 69,977 square meters. The 3rd to 6th floors are for commercial uses and are connected to Yokohama Bay Quarter on each floor, while the 7th to 30th floors are designated rental office space. The architecture was a long-awaited, large-scale office building in Yokohama where development of large office buildings remained rather inactive since the 1990s. It was also an office building of high quality that could compete with those constructed one after another in Tokyo during the 2000s. The building is connected directly to Yokohama Station via a pedestrian deck (Bay Quarter Walkway) that was concurrently constructed and allows people to access the station without getting rained on.

== Subsidiaries and affiliate companies abroad ==
- Mitsubishi Logistics Europe B.V.
- Mitsubishi Logistics America Corp.
- Mitsubishi Warehouse California Corp.
- Mitsubishi Logistics Hong Kong Ltd.
- Shanghai Linghua Logistics Co., Ltd.
- Shanghai Lingyun Global Forwarding Co., Ltd.
- Shenzhen Lingyang Global Forwarding co., ltd
- Mitsubishi Logistics (Thailand) Co., Ltd.
- Dia Logistics (M) Sdn. Bhd. in care of Master Movers Sdn. Bhd.
- Mitsubishi Logistics Singapore Pte. Ltd.
- P.T. Mitsubishi Logistics Indonesia, P.T. DIA-JAYA FORWARDING INDONESIA
