= Mitsubishi Aluminum Co. =

Japanese aluminum company

Mitsubishi Aluminum Co. logo

Mitsubishi Aluminum Co., Ltd. (三菱アルミニウム株式会社, Mitsubishi Aruminiumu Kabushiki-gaisha) is a Japanese manufacturer of aluminium related products. It is one of the core Mitsubishi companies. Established in 1962, it produces aluminum, aluminum alloy mill products and fabricated products.

== Shareholders ==
- Mitsubishi Materials
- Mitsubishi Chemical Corporation
- Mitsubishi Corporation
- Mitsubishi Heavy Industries
- MUFG
- Mitsubishi Electric Corporation
- Mitsubishi Estate
- The Mitsubishi Trust and Banking Corporation
- Meiji Yasuda Life Insurance Company
- Tokio Marine Nichido
