= Mitsubishi Foundation =

Academic research grant organisation

The Mitsubishi Foundation (財団法人三菱財団; Zaidan Hōjin Mitsubishi Zaidan) is a Japanese organization providing grants for academic research.

== History ==
In 1970, the Mitsubishi Group established the Mitsubishi Foundation to commemorate the centennial anniversary of the founding of the first Mitsubishi company. That foundation donates large sums of money annually to support scientific research and public-interest activities.
