= Yoshihara Shigetoshi =

Japanese diplomat (1845–1887)

Yoshihara Shigetoshi 吉原重俊

1st Governor of the Bank of Japan
- In office October 6, 1882 – December 19, 1887
- Monarch: Meiji
- Prime Minister: Itō Hirobumi
- Preceded by: Position established
- Succeeded by: Tomita Tetsunosuke

Personal details
- Born: May 15, 1845 Kagoshima, Japan
- Died: December 19, 1887 (aged 42)
- Occupation: diplomat, banker

Yoshihara Shigetoshi (吉原 重俊; May 15, 1845 – December 19, 1887) was a Japanese diplomat and first Governor of the Bank of Japan (BOJ).

== Biography ==
=== Early life ===
Yoshihara was born in Satsuma Domain (modern Kagoshima Prefecture as the son of a samurai retainer to the Shimazu clan. As a youth, he was the youngest of the Sonnō jōi samurai to participate in the "Terada-ya Incident", an assassination attempt against Sakamoto Ryōma at the Terada-ya inn in Kyoto. During the Anglo-Satsuma War of 1863, he fought alongside Ōyama Iwao and Saigō Tsugumichi. After the end of the conflict, he was sent to Edo, and then to Hakodate, where he was ordered to study rangaku and western customs under Takeda Ayasaburō. He then went to Yokohama to learn English from Samuel Robbins Brown.

=== Leaving Japan ===
In May 1866, with the assistance of Thomas Blake Glover, Yoshihara was one of five Satsuma samurai smuggled out of Japan on a Portuguese cargo ship to England, in violation of the national seclusion laws of the Tokugawa shogunate. Nire Kagenori was another of the five samurai in this mission. The five travelled via the Cape of Good Hope to London, where they met with the members of the first Satsuma delegation to England, which had arrived a year earlier. These included Mori Arinori, Terashima Munenori and Godai Tomoatsu. Yoshihara continued on to the United States, where he studied at the Wilbraham & Monson Academy in Wilbraham, Massachusetts (per a recommendation from Samuel Robbins Brown) in 1867. The same year, he met with Niijima Jō, who was studying near Boston. In January 1869, Yoshihara was baptized as a Christian at the Owasco Outlet Dutch Reformed Church shortly before he was accepted into Yale University in New Haven, Connecticut in 1869, where he studied political science and law.

=== Germany ===
Following the Meiji Restoration, he accompanied Ōyama Iwao, Shinagawa Yajirō and Nakahama Manjirō to Germany in 1871 during the Franco-Prussian War as official military observers, visiting Frankfurt, Berlin and calling on Paris during a ceasefire. Returning to Frankfurt, the delegation purchased modern currency printing machines, which were used by the Meiji government to print its first banknotes.

In 1872, Yoshihara was a last-minute addition to the Iwakura Mission in the position of Third Secretary. The delegation met with President Ulysses S. Grant, but was unsuccessful in its goal of revising the unequal treaties. He accompanied the Mission on to England and returned to Japan in March 1873.

=== Japan ===
On his return to Japan, Yoshihara accepted a post at the Foreign Ministry as First Secretary, and was assigned as a liaison to the American Consulate-General in Japan. The following year, he joined the Ministry of Finance as Director of the Yokohama Customs Office. However, in 1874 at the request of Ōkubo Toshimichi, he joined Gustave Emile Boissonade and the Japanese delegation to Qing dynasty China in the negotiations leading to the Japanese Expedition of 1874 to Taiwan. He returned to the Ministry of Finance in 1877 as First Secretary and Director of the Customs Bureau.

=== Paris ===
In November 1878, Yoshihara accompanied Matsukata Masayoshi and Aoki Shuzo to Paris in another unsuccessful attempt at revision of the unequal treaties. On February 28, 1880, he was made a director of the Yokohama Specie Bank and also held the post of Vice-Finance Minister. With the creation of the Bank of Japan, per the recommendation of Matsukata Masayoshi, Yoshihara was selected as the 1st Governor of the Bank of Japan on October 6, 1882.

During his tenure, he established the use of compound interest, promissory notes and bank checks. In 1885, he spent 10 months overseas, touring various European capitals.

=== Death ===
Yoshihara died while in office on December 19, 1887.

== Notes ==
Government offices
Preceded by <none>	Governor of the Bank of Japan; 1882–1887	Succeeded by Tomita Tetsunosuke
