= Tomita Tetsunosuke =

Japanese businessman

- 富田 鐵之助

Member of the House of Peers
- In office 29 September 1890 – 27 February 1916 Nominated by the Emperor

Governor of Tokyo
- In office 21 July 1891 – 26 October 1893
- Monarch: Meiji
- Preceded by: Hachisuka Mochiaki
- Succeeded by: Miura Yasushi

2nd Governor of the Bank of Japan
- In office 22 February 1888 – 3 September 1889
- Prime Minister: Itō Hirobumi; Kuroda Kiyotaka
- Preceded by: Yoshihara Shigetoshi
- Succeeded by: Kawada Koichiro

Personal details
- Born: 5 December 1835 Sendai, Mutsu, Japan
- Died: 27 February 1916 (aged 80)
- Resting place: Gokoku-ji
- Occupation: Diplomat, banker, entrepreneur

Tomita Tetsunosuke (富田 鐵之助; 5 December 1835 – 27 February 1916) was a Japanese businessman, 2nd Governor of the Bank of Japan (BOJ), and Governor of Tokyo.

== Biography ==
Tomita was born in Sendai Domain (modern Miyagi Prefecture), as the fourth son of a samurai retainer to the Date clan. In 1856, he was sent by the domain to Edo, to study western artillery science, and soon after his return, was sent back to Edo again to study naval science under Katsu Kaishū. In 1867, he was chosen to accompany Katsu Kaishū’s son to the United States for studies. He studied economics at the Whitney Business College in Newark, New Jersey, under William C Whitney (who was subsequently hired by Mori Arinori as a foreign advisor to teach the Double-entry bookkeeping system in Japan).

With the Boshin War, and the overthrow of the Tokugawa Shogunate, Tomita returned briefly to Japan, but was urged back to the United States by Katsu Kaishū. His position was recognized by the new Meiji government was thus able to help organize the visit of the Iwakura Mission to the United States in 1872. Ito Hirobumi and Okubo Toshimichi confirmed his position as the first Japanese Vice-Consul to New York during the course of the Iwakura Mission. He finally returned to Japan in 1874, and soon became a member of the Meirokusha. Through the introduction of Fukuzawa Yukichi, he married the daughter of Sugiyama Gen, and drew up the first recorded formal marriage contract in Japan. Afterwards, he was appointed Japanese consul-general to Shanghai. Subsequently, Tomita served as Secretary to the Japanese legation in London.

On Tomita’s return to Japan in 1881, he was recruited by the Ministry of Finance for his wide-ranging knowledge of world economics, and was appointed the first Vice-Governor of the new Bank of Japan in 1882. After the sudden death of Yoshihara Shigetoshi, the 1st Governor of the Bank of Japan in 1887, Tomita was promoted on 21 February 1888, to take his position. During his tenure, he attempted to establish a central discount rate and stabilize foreign exchange, which he saw as core roles of a central bank. However, in these actions he was opposed by the Yokohama Specie Bank and by Finance Minister Matsukata Masayoshi. Resisting orders by Matsukata to change BOJ policies, he was relieved of his position on 3 September 1889, after 19 months as head of the bank.

The following year, Tomita was appointed to a seat in the House of Peers of the Diet of Japan, and from 21 July 1891 to 26 October 1893, was Governor of Tokyo. During his tenure, the three Tama Districts were transferred from Kanagawa Prefecture to Tokyo, thus greatly expanding its hinterland.

In 1893, he retired from politics and entered the business world, founding the Kangyo Bank (one of the predecessors of modern Mizuho Corporate Bank), the Yokohama Fire Insurance Company, later known as Yokohama Fire, Marine, Transit & Fidelity Insurance, and Fujibo Holdings. He was also a director on the board of the Nippon Railway. Tomita also founded the Kyoritsu Women's University.

== Notes ==
Government offices
Preceded by Yoshihara Shigetoshi	Governor of the Bank of Japan; 1888–1889	Succeeded by Kawada Koichiro
Preceded by Hachisuka Mochiaki	Governor of Tokyo; 1891–1893	Succeeded by Miura Yasushi
