= Meiwa Corp. =

Meiwa Corporation (明和産業株式会社; Meiwa Sangyō Kabushiki Gaisha) TYO: 8103 is a Japanese trading company in Tokyo, related to Mitsubishi group.

The company was established in 1947, by members from chemicals and some other departments of former Mitsubishi Corporation, that was liquidated under order of General Headquarters of the Allied Forces after World War II.

After merging Sansho Co., Ltd. in 1959 and listing in friendship trading company with China in 1962, the company developed into an all-round trading company with business mainly with socialist countries. It was later listed on the Second Section of the Tokyo Stock Exchange in 1973, and on the First Section in 1975.

Owing to social changes such as normalization of diplomatic relations between Japan and China, the company once narrowed down the focus of business lines and trading partner countries. After expanding business in South East Asia, it now has 3 liaison offices and 2 subsidiary companies in China, liaison offices in Vietnam and South Korea and 4 subsidiary companies in Vietnam, Thailand and Indonesia. Main lines of trading have specialized to chemicals, plastics, building materials, petroleum products, functional materials and building materials. There are some related companies in chemicals, plastics, building materials and glass ware, too.

The capital is 4,024 million Yen, the president is Nobuhiko Ohtomo. The main stockholders are Mitsubishi Corporation, Mitsubishi Chemical Corporation, Asahi Glass Co., Ltd.

Company motto : Bright and Friendly
