= Mitsubishi =

Group of autonomous Japanese companies

Mitsubishi Group

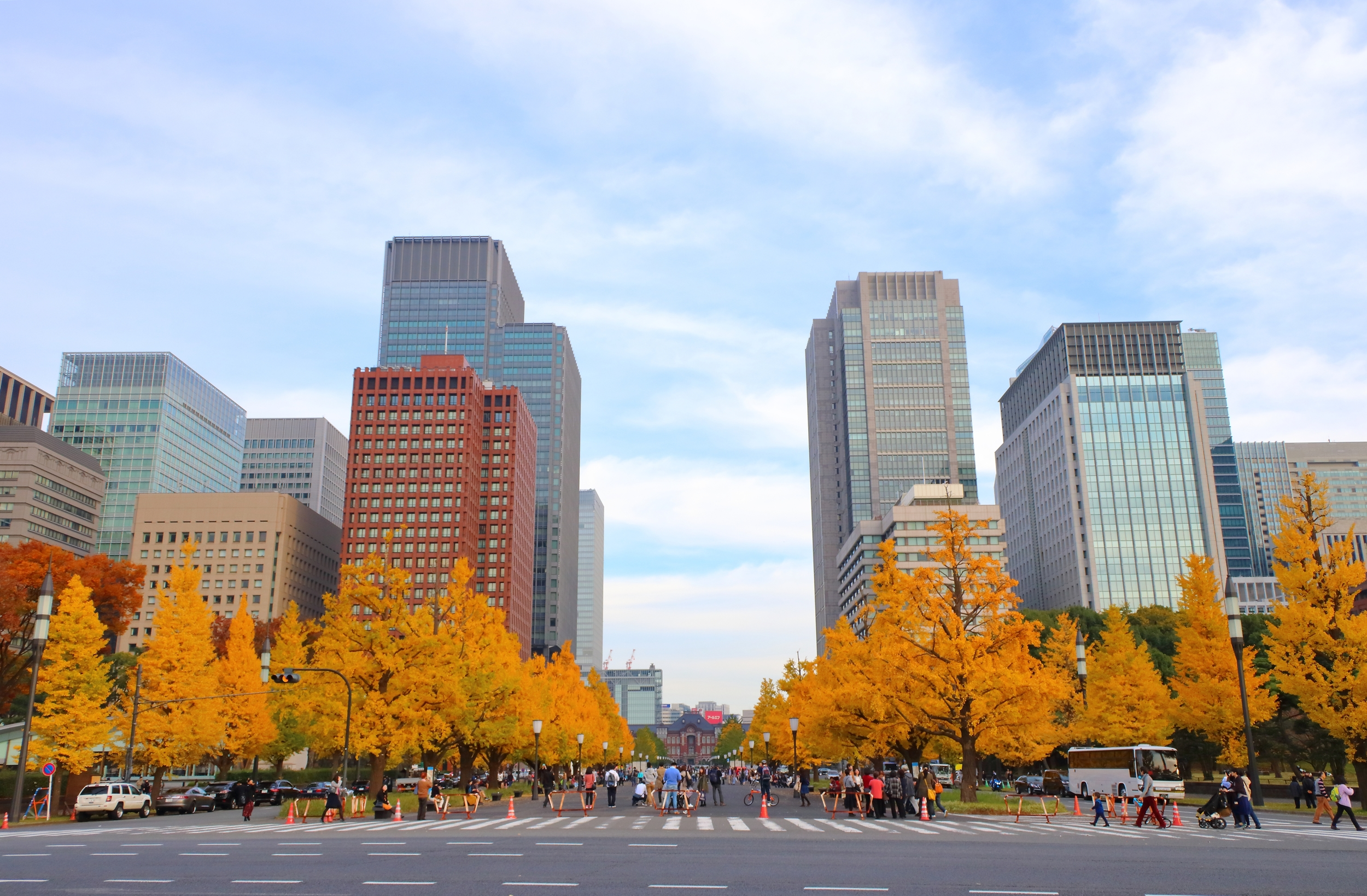
- Marunouchi, where most Mitsubishi companies are headquartered
- Native name: 三菱グループ
- Romanized name: Mitsubishi Gurūpu
- Formerly: List: Tsukumo Shokai (1870); Mitsukawa Shokai; Mitsubishi Shokai (1873); Mitsubishi Kisen Kaisha (1875); Yubin Kisen Mitsubishi Kaisha (1875); Mitsubishi Goshi Kaisha
- Industry: List: Automotive; Chemical; Electronics; Food; Financial; Metallurgy; Mining; Petroleum
- Founded: 1870; 156 years ago
- Founder: Yatarō Iwasaki
- Headquarters: Tokyo, Japan
- Area served: Worldwide
- Services: List: Financial; Insurances; Mortgage loan; Personal banking
- Number of employees: 1,310,000
- Subsidiaries: List: Mitsubishi Aircraft Corporation; Mitsubishi Aluminum Co.; Mitsubishi Chemical Group; Mitsubishi Corporation; Mitsubishi Electric; Mitsubishi Estate; Mitsubishi Gas Chemical Company; Mitsubishi Heavy Industries; Mitsubishi Logistics; Mitsubishi Materials; Mitsubishi Motors; Mitsubishi Paper Mills; Mitsubishi Steel; MUFG; AGC Inc.; BHP Mitsubishi Alliance; Fuso; Kirin Company; Tokio Marine; Nikon Group; Nippon Yusen; Morgan Stanley (23.3%)
- Website: mitsubishi.com

Mitsubishi Group (三菱グループ, Mitsubishi Gurūpu) is a group of autonomous Japanese multinational companies.

Founded by Iwasaki Yatarō in 1870, the Mitsubishi Group traces its origins to the Mitsubishi zaibatsu, a unified company that existed from 1870 to 1946. The company, along with other major zaibatsu, was disbanded during the occupation of Japan following World War II by the order of the Allies. Despite the dissolution, the former constituent companies continue to share the Mitsubishi brand and trademark.

While the group of companies engages in limited business cooperation, most notably through monthly "Friday Conference" executive meetings, they remain formally independent and are not under common control. The three main entities (gosanke) are MUFG (the largest bank in Japan), Mitsubishi Corporation (a general trading company), and Mitsubishi Heavy Industries (a diversified manufacturing company). A 2020 estimate concluded that all the Mitsubishi companies combined generate 7.7% of the total revenue of all publicly traded companies in Japan, and the group's assets amount to 433 trillion yen.

== History ==
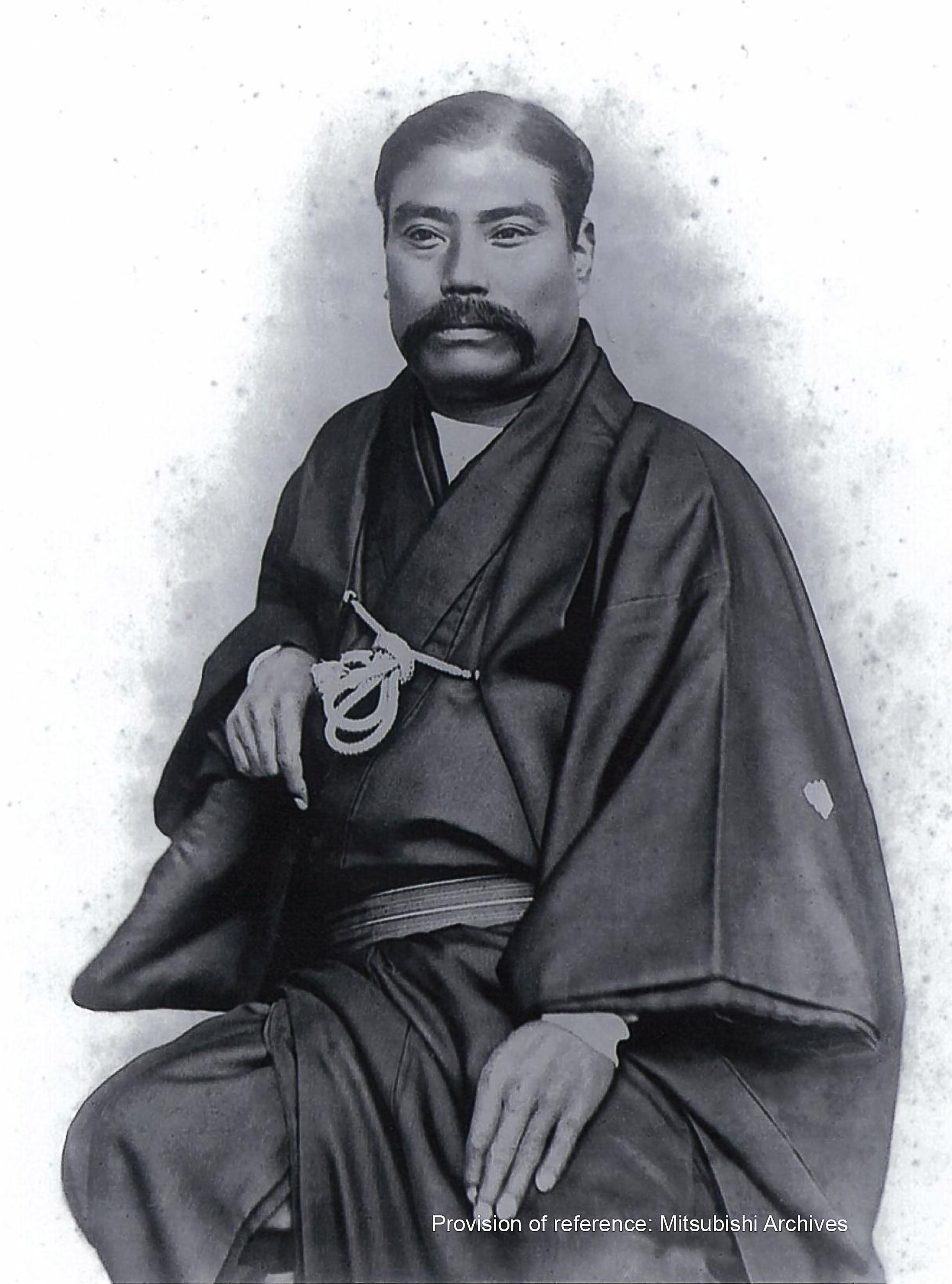
Yatarō Iwasaki, the founder of Mitsubishi

The Mitsubishi company was established as a shipping firm by Iwasaki Yatarō (1834–1885) in 1870 under the name "Tsukumo Shokai" (九十九商会). In 1873, its name was changed to Mitsubishi Shokai; Mitsubishi (三菱) consists of two parts: "mitsu" (三) meaning "three" (as in the three oak leaves from the crest of the Yamauchi or Tosa family that ruled over Yatarō's birthplace and employed him) and "hishi" (菱, which becomes "bishi" under rendaku) meaning "water caltrop", and hence "rhombus", which is reflected in the company's logo. It is also translated as "three diamonds".

Mitsubishi was established in 1870, two years after the Meiji Restoration, with shipping as its core business. Its diversification was mostly into related fields. It entered into coal-mining to gain the coal needed for ships, bought a shipbuilding yard from the government to repair the ships it used, founded an iron mill to supply iron to the shipbuilding yard, started a marine insurance business to cater for its shipping business, and so forth. Later, the managerial resources and technological capabilities acquired through the operation of shipbuilding were used to expand the business further into the manufacture of aircraft and equipment. The experience of overseas shipping led the firm to enter into a trading business.

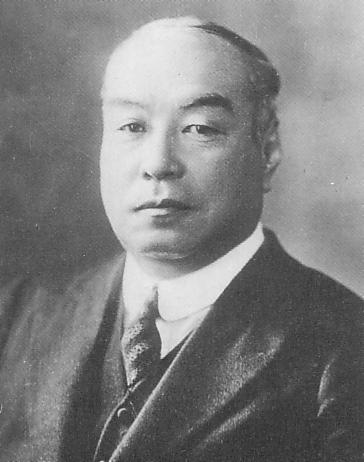
Koyata Iwasaki, the longest-serving head of the unified Mitsubishi

In 1881, the company bought into coal mining by acquiring the Takashima Mine, followed by Hashima Island in 1890, using the production to fuel their extensive steamship fleet. They also diversified into shipbuilding, banking, insurance, warehousing, and trade. Later diversification carried the organization into such sectors as paper, steel, glass, electrical equipment, aircraft, oil, and real estate. As Mitsubishi built a broadly based conglomerate, it played a central role in the modernization of Japanese industry. In 1894, Hisaya Iwasaki succeeded his uncle Yanosuke as president. During his tenure until 1916, he modernised the Nagasaki Shipyard and developed Marunouchi as a business district.

Hisaya was succeeded by his cousin Koyata in 1916, and during his time as president the group saw a significant expansion. In 1917, he funded the establishment of an optics company and became the majority shareholder, which later became Nikon. During this era, Mitsubishi Heavy Industries was at the forefront of Japan's aircraft development. He reorganised the group into a form similar to what it is now, and he spun off each department into a subsidiary. Most of them later went public, as he thought that for the sake of the expansion of business, more core capital was needed.

The firm's prime real estate holdings in the Marunouchi district of Tokyo, acquired in 1890, were spun off in 1937 to form Mitsubishi Estate, now one of the largest real estate development companies in Japan.

=== World War II ===
During the Second World War, which was often advertised in government propaganda as a total war, Mitsubishi was a key player in the nation's wartime economy. Educated in England and having many business friends and partners in the Anglosphere, Koyata was opposed to fighting a war against the Allies. However, he famously stated in his speech on 10 December 1941 that once the country had decided to wage a war with the United States and the British Empire, each member of the company ought to serve the country in fulfilling its only goal, but the company should not forget what it owed to people in these countries.

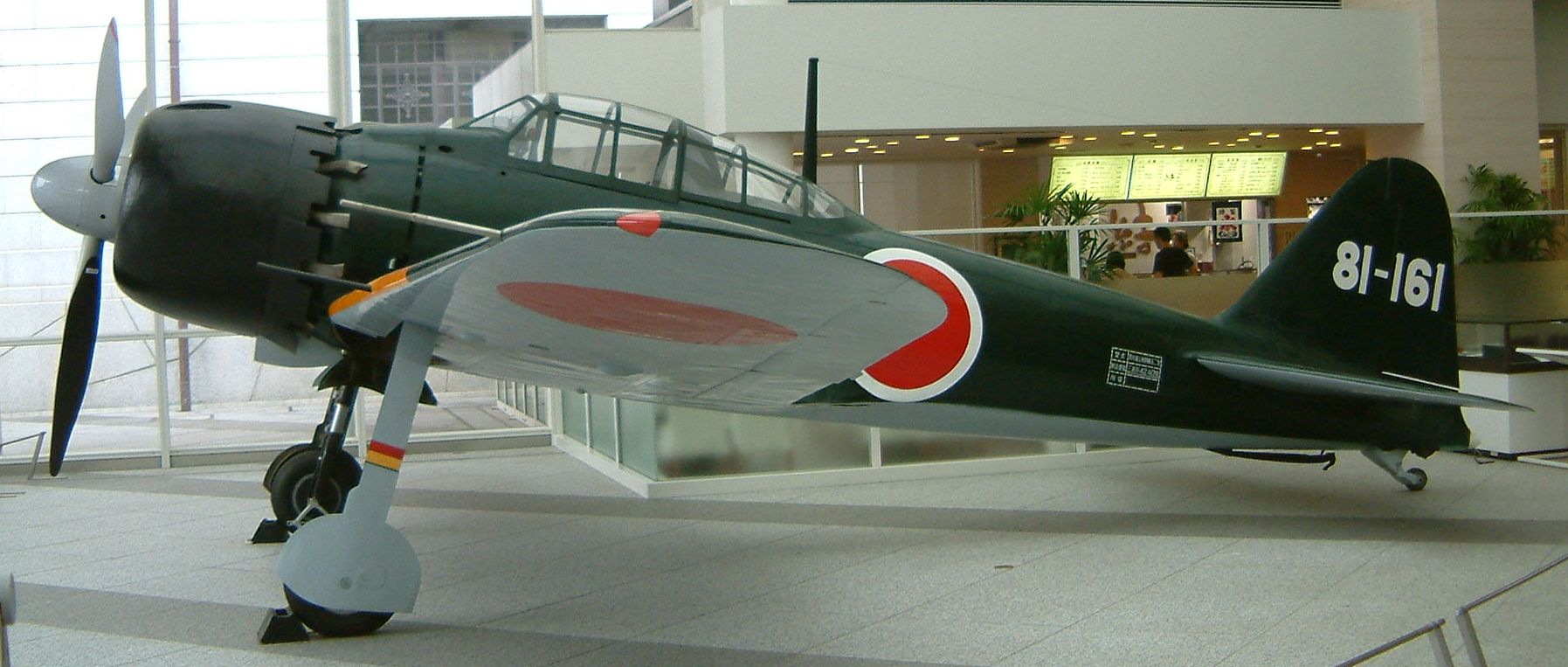
Mitsubishi A6M "Zero" fighter

Arguably, one of the most tangible ways in which Mitsubishi was involved in the war was through its supply of ships, aircraft and other arms by Mitsubishi Heavy Industries. The Mitsubishi A6M Zero fighter, designed by Jiro Horikoshi was the primary fighter of the Imperial Navy. Production of these equipments made Mitsubishi factories one of the main targets for Allied attacks, and in one factory the death toll among its workers amounted to 494 in a week. Mitsubishi Mining was involved in the forced labour of Allied prisoners of war and people from Japan's colonies and occupied territories such as parts of China. The company's Iizuka mine counted 19 deaths of Chinese labourers during the war. In 2015, Mitsubishi Materials (formerly Mitsubishi Mining) compensated 3,765 Chinese labourers who were conscripted to the company during the war and apologised to ex-American prisoners of war. Mitsubishi was involved in the opium trade in China during this period.

=== Post-war era ===
==== Dissolution and reorganisation of the unified Mitsubishi ====
After the Second World War, under the Allied Occupation's policy to dissolve zaibatsu, the Mitsubishi conglomerate underwent significant restructuring. Until the Cold War made the Eastern Bloc more menacing than the possible revival of a strong Japan and Germany, the occupation forces’ initial aim, just like in Germany, was to weaken the Japanese economy so that the country could never wage war against them. Under this policy, Mitsubishi as a group was dissolved. Mitsubishi Heavy Industries and Mitsubishi Chemical were split into three separate entities. On his deathbed, Koyata Iwasaki staunchly defended his actions, asserting that he had done his utmost for his country and had nothing to be ashamed of. Despite his resistance, he could not defy the tide of the times. His cousin, Hisaya Iwasaki, president of Mitsubishi Partnership Company at the time, expressed his frustration with the situation, noting that the company had been stripped bare, leaving only his ancestral land in Tosa and a mausoleum in Tokyo. His main residence in Shitaya was requisitioned by the American military, and Hisaya had to temporarily rent rooms in his former house.

Due to the zaibatsu dissolution, Mitsubishi Estate was split into two companies, Kanto Real Estate and Yowa Real Estate. Yowa Real Estate owned a significant portion of the land between the Imperial Palace and Tokyo Station, including the Marunouchi Building. In 1952, an incident occurred where two men, Kuniichiro Fujiami and Shomitsu Tajima, who were closely linked to infamous yakuza, attempted to take over Yowa Real Estate by becoming majority shareholders, as the market capitalisation of the company was significantly less than its real estate holdings. They greenmailed, and other Mitsubishi companies had to buy the shares from them at an unjustly high price. This incident accelerated Mitsubishi's reintegration. In 1954, Mitsubishi Corporation was reformed, and the Mitsubishi Friday Club was established to foster camaraderie and information exchange among the chairpersons and presidents of major Mitsubishi companies. By 1964, Mitsubishi Heavy Industries also reemerged. The Friday Club symbolised the formation of an equal group of companies, rather than the revival of the pre-war Mitsubishi zaibatsu with Mitsubishi Headquarters at the apex.

==== Contemporary Mitsubishi Group ====
In 1970, Mitsubishi companies established the Mitsubishi Foundation to commemorate the centennial anniversary of the founding of the first Mitsubishi company. The companies also individually maintain charitable foundations. Mitsubishi pavilions have been highlights of expositions in Japan since EXPO'70 in Osaka in the 1970s to 1980s.

== Companies ==
=== Business form ===
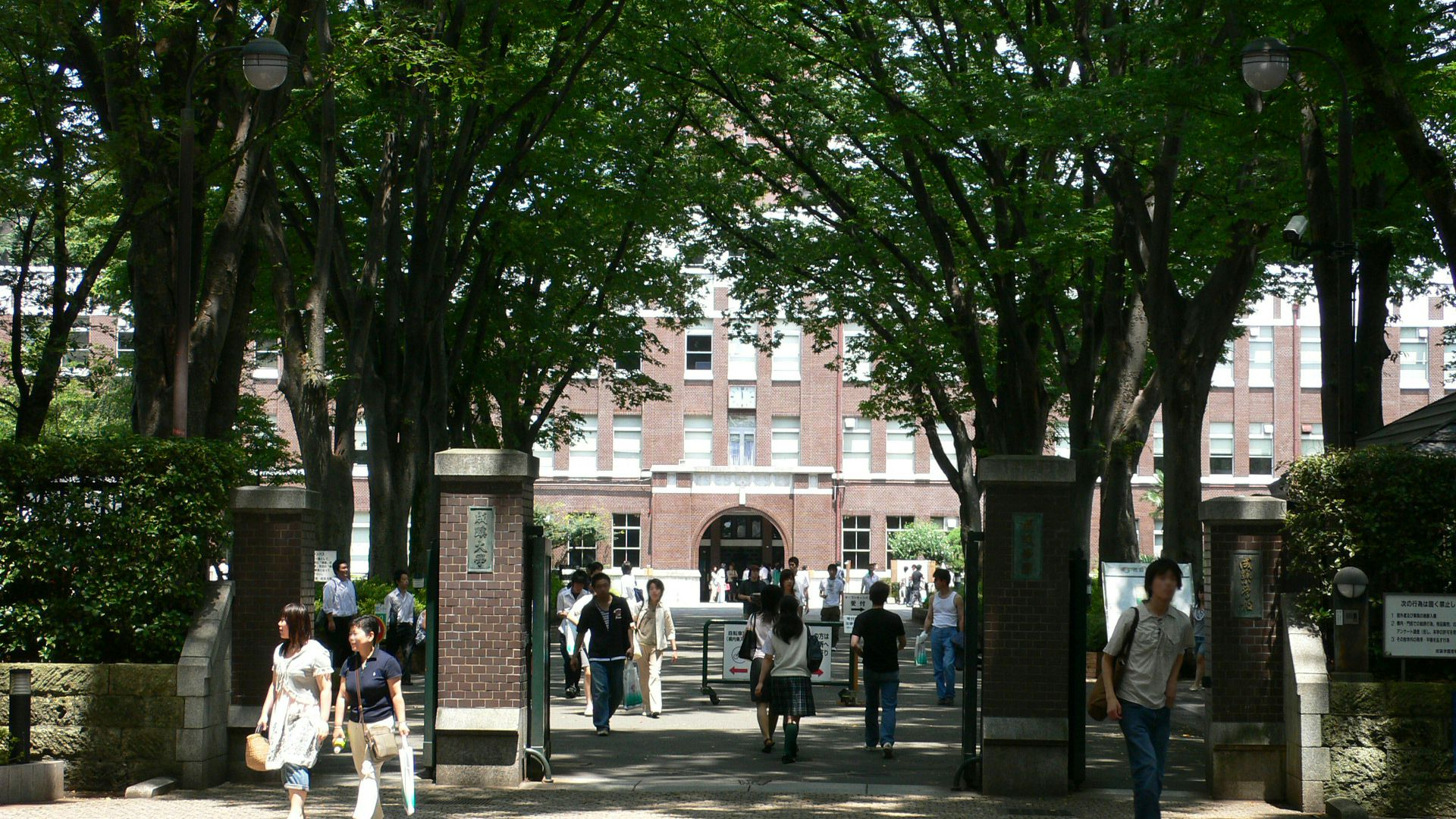
The main campus of Seikei University

The Mitsubishi Group is made up of about 40 individual companies without a controlling parent company. Each of the Mitsubishi companies owns substantial (but usually not controlling) portions of the shares of the others.

Twenty-nine of the group companies participate in the Friday Conference (金曜会, Kinyō-kai), a luncheon meeting of their most senior executives held on the second Friday of each month. The group began its tradition of monthly executive meetings in 1952, and over time the meetings became a venue for coordinating policy between the group companies. By the 1990s, this practice was criticized (particularly by non-Japanese investors) as a possible violation of antitrust law. Since 1993, the Friday Conference has officially been held as a social function, and not for the purpose of discussing or coordinating business strategy. Despite this, the Friday Conference has been a venue for informal cooperation and coordination between the group companies, most notably in bailing out Mitsubishi Motors during the mid-2000s.

In addition to the Friday Conference, the group companies' heads of general affairs hold a meeting on the third Monday of each month, and the group companies' legal and IP departments hold a trademark policy coordination meeting on the first Friday of each month.

The company briefly dabbled in television during the early 1990s, when it agreed a deal with Westinghouse Broadcasting International to become the Japanese distribution representative.

=== Core members ===
Three of the group companies are informally known as the "Three Great Houses" (御三家, Gosanke) and hold a separate coordinating meeting prior to each Friday Conference:

- MUFG Bank (flagship subsidiary of the MUFG)
- Mitsubishi Corporation
- Mitsubishi Heavy Industries

Ten other "major" group companies participate in the coordinating meeting on a rotating basis (with six of the ten companies participating in any given month):

- AGC Inc.
- Kirin Company
- Meiji Yasuda Life
- Mitsubishi Chemical Group
- Mitsubishi Electric
- Mitsubishi Estate
- Mitsubishi Materials
- Mitsubishi UFJ Trust and Banking Corporation (subsisidary of the MUFG)
- NYK Line (Nippon Yusen Kabushiki Kaisha)
- Tokio Marine Nichido

=== Other members ===
- ENEOS Holdings
- Mitsubishi Fuso Truck and Bus Corporation
- Mitsubishi Logistics
- Mitsubishi Motors
- Mitsubishi Paper Mills
- Mitsubishi Research Institute
- Mitsubishisteel MFG. Co., Ltd

- MSSC

- Mitsubishi UFJ Securities
- Nikon
- Mitsubishi UBE Cement

=== Related organizations ===
- Atami Yowado
- Chitose Kosan
- Dai Nippon Toryo
- The Dia Foundation for Research on Ageing Societies
- Diamond Family Club
- Kaitokaku
- Koiwai Noboku Kaisha
- LEOC Japan
- Marunouchi Yorozu
- Meiwa Corp.
- Mitsubishi Agricultural Machinery
- Mitsubishi C&C Research Association
- Mitsubishi Club
- Mitsubishi Corporate Name and Trademark Committee
- Mitsubishi Economic Research Institute
- Mitsubishi Electric Automation
- Mitsubishi Foundation
- Mitsubishi Kinyokai
- Mitsubishi Marketing Association
- Mitsubishi Motors North America
- Mitsubishi Public Affairs Committee
- The Mitsubishi Yowakai Foundation
- MT Insurance Service
- Nippon TCS Solution Center
- Seikadō Bunko Art Museum
- Shonan Country Club
- Sotsu Corporation
- Tōyō Bunko
- Seikei University
- All Mitsubishi Lions

== See also ==
- Mitsubishi Pencil Company, which has never been part of the Mitsubishi Group despite its name
