= Yoshinobu Shiba =

Japanese historian (born 1930)

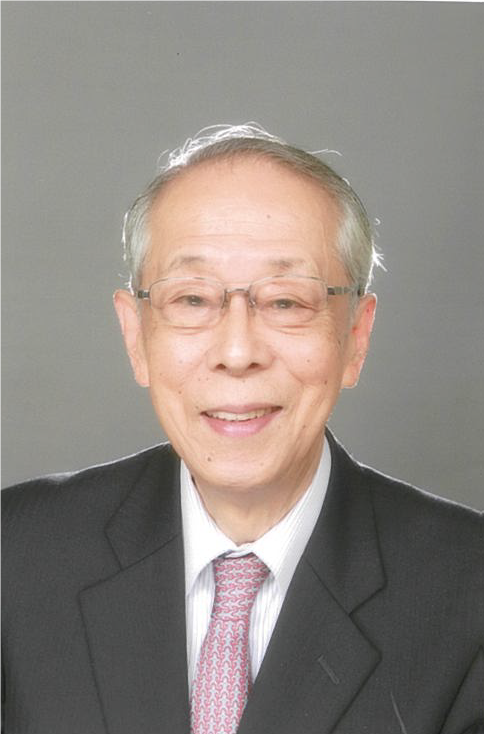
- Other name: 斯波義信
- Education: University of Tokyo (BA, MA, PhD)
- Occupation: Historian
- Employer: Osaka University

Yoshinobu Shiba (斯波義信, Shiba Yoshinobu) (born 20 October 1930) is a retired Japanese historian of China and professor emeritus of Osaka University, who specializes in Song dynasty history. A member of the Japan Academy, he has received the Order of Culture, Order of the Sacred Treasure, and Person of Cultural Merit in Japan. In 2018, he jointly received the Tang Prize in Sinology with Stephen Owen, "for his mastery and depth of insight in Chinese social-economic history achieved through his original theoretical lens that fuses the distinctive fortes of Chinese, Japanese, and Western scholarship."

== Education ==
Shiba holds a BA, MA, and PhD from the University of Tokyo.

== Academic career ==
Several of his specialist works have been translated into English, including the landmark study Commerce and Society in Sung China (1968, abridged English translation published in 1970), which remains a respected work on Chinese economic history. He has written two chapters that have been translated into English that describe the long-term economic and environmental history of the plains of northern Zhejiang.

== Publications ==
=== Books ===
- Commerce and Society in Sung China (translated by Mark Elvin). Ann Arbor: University of Michigan Press, 1970. Commerce and Society in Sung China (translation)
- "Ningbo and its Hinterland," pp. 391–439, In G. William Skinner, ed., The City in Late Imperial China. Stanford: Stanford University Press, 1977.
- “Environment versus Water Control: The Case of the Southern Hangzhou Bay Area from the Mid-Tang through the Qing.” In Sediments of Time: Environment and Society in Chinese History, edited by Mark Elvin and Liu Tsui-jung 劉翠榮, 135–64. Cambridge: Cambridge University Press, 1998.
