= Iwasaki Yanosuke =

Japanese banker, businessman, investor and politician (1851-1908)

Baron Iwasaki Yanosuke 岩崎彌之助
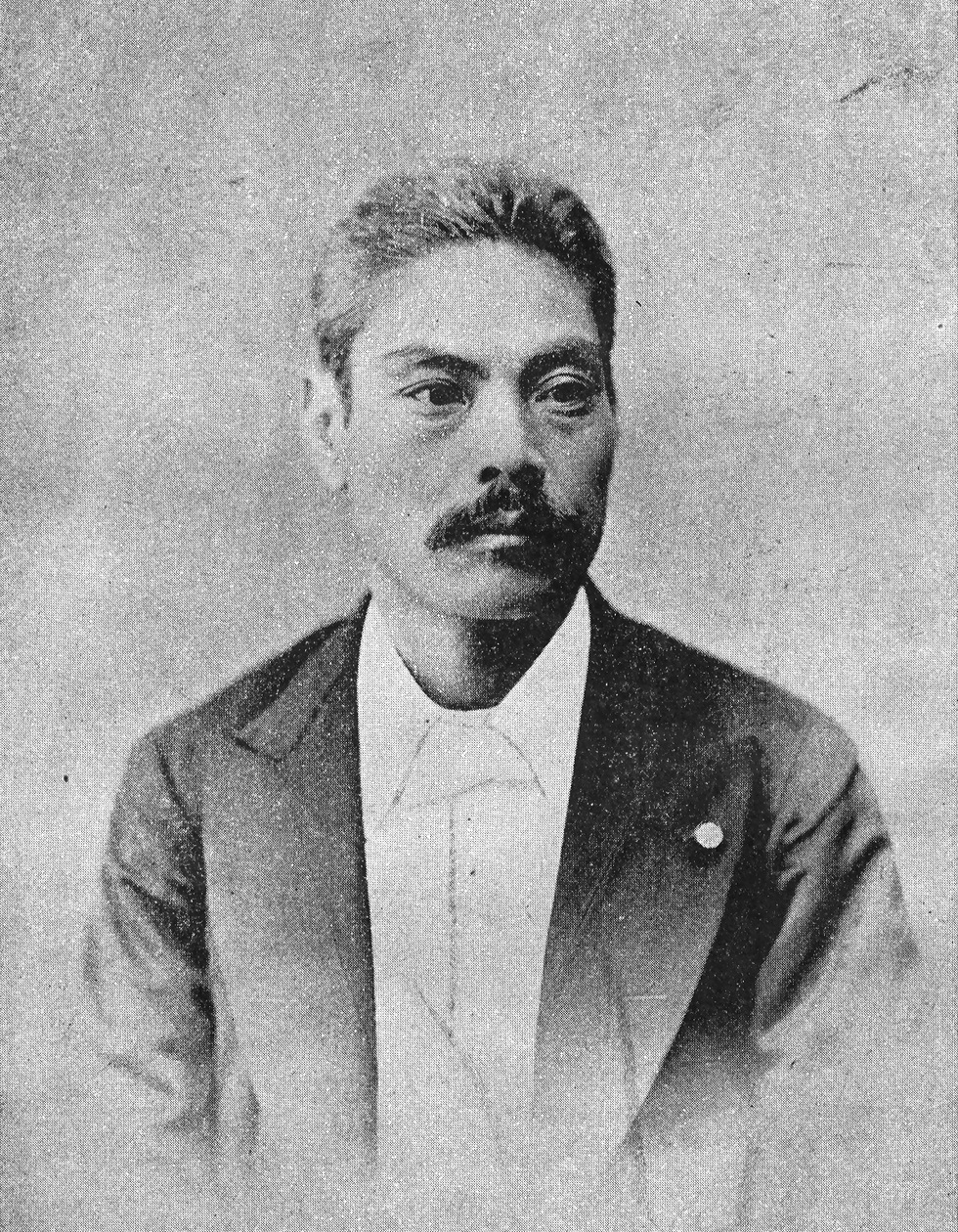

4th Governor of the Bank of Japan
- In office November 11, 1896 – October 20, 1898
- Monarch: Meiji
- Prime Minister: Matsukata Masayoshi; Itō Hirobumi; Ōkuma Shigenobu
- Preceded by: Kawada Koichiro
- Succeeded by: Yamamoto Tatsuo

Personal details
- Children: Koyata Iwasaki, Toshiya Iwasaki

Baron Iwasaki Yanosuke (岩崎 彌之助; February 8, 1851 – March 25, 1908) was a Japanese banker, businessman, investor, and politician. After his brother Yataro's death in 1885, he succeeded to the presidency of Mitsubishi, one of Japan's largest conglomerates (zaibatsu). He served as the 4th Governor of the Bank of Japan (BOJ). He was created a Baron in 1900, and he was a member of Japan's House of Peers.

== Early life ==
Iwasaki was born in Kōchi Prefecture. He was the brother of Iwasaki Yatarō, the founder of Mitsubishi. He was educated at the Tokyo Imperial University and at the University of Pennsylvania in Philadelphia.

== Career ==
In 1885, Iwasaki became the second president of Mitsubishi. As the head of Mitsubishi, he purchased Marunouchi from the government in 1890. Marunouchi has since evolved into one of the most important business districts in the nation having 20 Fortune Global 500 companies headquartered there in 2021.

He was succeeded in 1894 as the president of Mitsubishi by Hisaya Iwasaki, the male heir to founder Yataro.

Iwasaki was Governor of the Bank of Japan from November 11, 1896—October 20, 1898.

== Legacy ==
Iwasaki's son Koyata would become Mitsubishi's 4th president; and his second son Toshiya would found his own company, Asahi Glass.

== Notes ==
Government offices
Preceded by Kawada Koichiro	Governor of the Bank of Japan; 1896–1898	Succeeded by Tatsuo Yamamoto
