= LEOC Japan =

Japanese catering service company

LEOC JAPAN Co., Ltd. (株式会社レオックジャパン, Kabushiki-gaisha Reokku Japan) (JASDAQ: 2366) is a Japanese catering service company. It serves meals throughout Japan. In J. League, LEOC has been the main sponsor of pro soccer team Tokyo Verdy 1969. In August 2003 LEOC was established as a holding company of Sodexho Japan Co., Ltd. by stock exchange.

It is an affiliate company of Mitsubishi Corporation.
