= Koyata Iwasaki =

Japanese businessperson (died 1945)

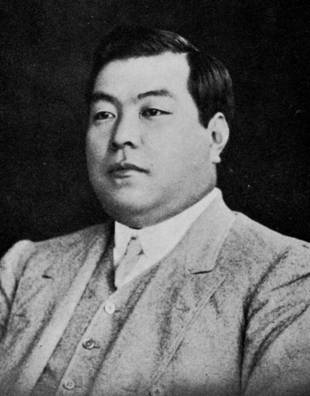
- Died: December 1945
- Education: Tokyo Imperial University; Pembroke College, Cambridge
- Title: President of Mitsubishi (1916–45)
- Family: Iwasaki

Koyata Iwasaki was a Japanese industrialist who served as the fourth and last president of the unified Mitsubishi. He was the last person to hold the office before the Allied Occupation Forces ordered the dissolution of all major zaibatsu.

== Early life and education ==
He attended the First Higher School, then matriculated at Tokyo Imperial University. He later matriculated at Pembroke College, Cambridge, where he read history, geography, and sociology. He started working for Mitsubishi in 1906. In 1906, he married Takako (岩崎孝子), the daughter of Baron Uzuhiko Shimazu.

== As president of Mitsubishi ==
He succeeded his cousin Kyuya as the President of Mitsubishi in 1916, during the First World War. He held the office for 29 years, a period during which he significantly expanded the group. He spun off each department into a subsidiary, covering sectors such as mining, shipbuilding, banking, trading, and real estate. Under his leadership, Mitsubishi enjoyed de facto monopolies or oligopolies in many of these sectors. To further expand the group, he sold nearly half of the shares of these subsidiaries to the public, while Mitsubishi headquarters, led by him, owned the rest. In 1917, he also privately funded the establishment of an optics company and became the majority shareholder, which later became Nikon.

After the surrender of Japan in 1945, the Allied Occupation Forces ordered all major zaibatsu to be split into smaller companies, and all members of the founding families were forced to sell all the shares they held. Koyata was strongly opposed to this order but died in December of the same year. The site of his house in Roppongi is now occupied by the International House of Japan. Although the building was rebuilt in 1955, the garden remains largely as it was when Koyata commissioned it in 1930.

== Atami Yowado ==
Atami Yowado (熱海陽和洞) was a holiday villa of Koyata Iwasaki located in Atami, Shizuoka Prefecture. Iwasaki commissioned Ogawa Jihei VII, a renowned garden architect from Kyoto, to build the garden in a grand style. In April 1978, member companies of the Mitsubishi Kinyokai, core 29 companies of Mitsubishi Group, inaugurated "Management committee of Atami Yowado" (熱海陽和洞管理委員会). Today, the villa is used as a club for Mitsubishi executives.
