= Mitsubishi Corporation =

Japanese trading company

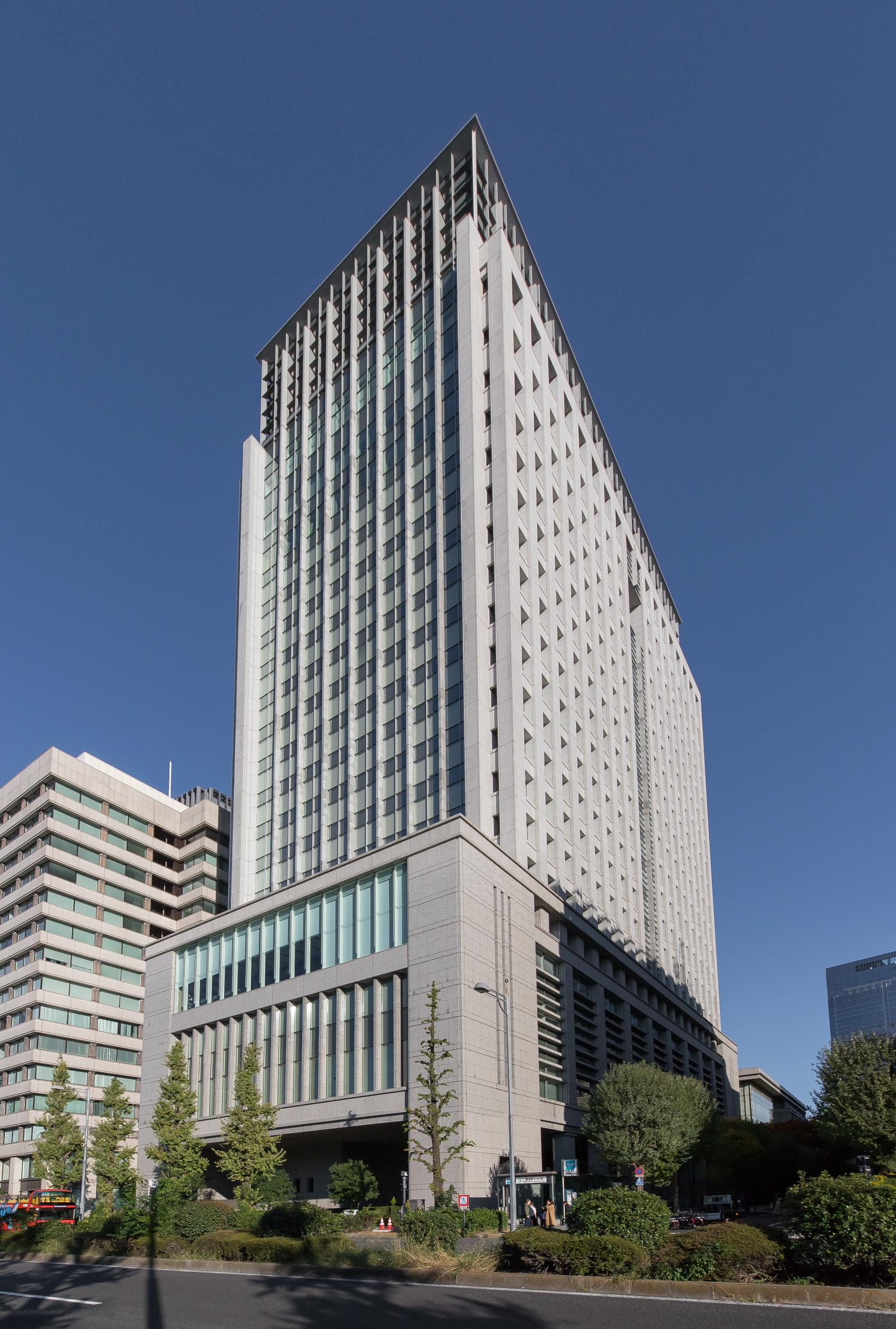
- The Mitsubishi Shoji Building, one of the two headquarters of the company in Marunouchi, Chiyoda, Tokyo
- Native name: 三菱商事株式会社
- Romanized name: Mitsubishi Shōji Kabushiki-gaisha
- Formerly: Kowa Jitsugyo Kaisha; Mitsubishi Shoji Kaisha, Ltd.
- Type: Public
- Traded as: TYO: 8058; LSE: MBC; Nikkei 225 component (8058); TOPIX Core30 component (8058)
- Industry: General trading company
- Founded: Incorporated in 1918; 108 years ago Refounded in 1954
- Headquarters: Registered Head Office: Mitsubishi Shoji Building; 3-1 Marunouchi 2-Chome, Marunouchi, Chiyoda, Tokyo; Marunouchi Park Building; 6-1, Marunouchi 2-Chome, Marunouchi, Chiyoda, Tokyo, Chiyoda, Tokyo, Japan
- Number of locations: 121
- Area served: Worldwide
- Key people: Takehiko Kakiuchi (chairman); Katsuya Nakanishi (president and CEO)
- Products: LNG & petroleum; Metals & coking coal; Industrial & specialty chemicals; Automobiles & commercial vehicles; Agricultural commodities & food products; Consumer goods
- Services: Global trading & supply chain management; Project development & infrastructure investment; Private equity & corporate finance; Power generation & renewable energy development; Urban development & data center operation; Retail & logistics solutions
- Revenue: ▲¥18.92 trillion (US$172.36 billion) (FY2026)
- Operating income: ▼¥1.1 trillion (US$9.99 billion) (FY2026)
- Net income: ▼¥800.46 billion (US$7.29 billion) (FY2026)
- Total assets: ▲¥24.15 trillion (US$220.06 billion) (FY2026)
- Total equity: ▲¥10.25 trillion (US$93.4 billion) (FY2026)
- Number of employees: 4,456 (parent); 63,037 (consolidated, 31 March 2026)
- Parent: The Master Trust Bank of Japan 15.21%; Berkshire Hathaway 9.61%; Custody Bank of Japan 5.37%; Meiji Yasuda Life 4.09%; Tokio Marine Nichido 2.32%; JPMorgan Chase 1.34%
- Subsidiaries: Mitsubishi Shokuhin (61.99%); Lawson (50.12%); Princes Group
- Website: mitsubishicorp.com

Mitsubishi Corporation (三菱商事株式会社, Mitsubishi Shōji Kabushiki-gaisha) is a Japanese general trading company (sogo shosha) and a core member of the Mitsubishi Group. For much of the post-war period, Mitsubishi Corporation has been the largest of the five great sogo shosha (Mitsubishi, Mitsui, Itochu, Sumitomo, Marubeni) by revenue as well as profits.

The company was originally spun off from Mitsubishi & Co., Ltd, the holding company of the Mitsubishi Group at the time, in 1918 by Koyata Iwasaki. It was later split into three smaller trading companies by order of the Allied Occupation Forces, as major zaibatsu, including Mitsubishi, were deemed the backbone of Japan's pre-war economy. These companies re-merged in 1954, once again assuming the name Mitsubishi Corporation.

Mitsubishi’s operations began shifting away from the mere importing and exporting of goods in the 1960s. Starting with an investment in a liquefied natural gas field in Brunei in 1968, Mitsubishi rapidly moved towards investing directly in projects and companies overseas, rather than simply trading products.

Today, Mitsubishi holds interests in numerous large energy, mining, chemical, and infrastructure projects abroad, which generate the bulk of the company's revenue. It also operates consumer-facing businesses, such as a 50% share in the convenience store chain Lawson, along with other ventures in finance, healthcare, food, and apparel, both in Japan and overseas. In recent years, Mitsubishi has also been active in investing in technology start-ups and clean energy projects.

Mitsubishi Corporation is listed on the Tokyo Stock Exchange, where it is part of the blue-chip TOPIX Core 30 and the Nikkei 225 indices. It is also known as one of the highest-paying publicly listed employers in Japan. In terms of global recognition, Mitsubishi Corporation was ranked 65th in the Fortune Global 500, and 78th in the Forbes Global 2000 in 2024.

== History ==
=== Early history ===
The company traces its roots to the Mitsubishi conglomerate founded by Yataro Iwasaki. Iwasaki was originally employed by the Tosa clan of modern-day Kōchi Prefecture, who posted him to Nagasaki in the 1860s. During this time, Iwasaki became close to Sakamoto Ryōma, a major figure in the Meiji Restoration that ended the Tokugawa shogunate and restored the nominal primacy of the emperor of Japan in 1867. Iwasaki was placed in charge of the Tosa clan's trading operation, Tsukumo Shokai, based in Osaka. This company changed its name in the following years to Mitsukawa Shokai and then to Mitsubishi Shokai. Around 1871, the company was renamed Mitsubishi Steamship Company and began a mail service between Yokohama and Shanghai with government sponsorship.

Under Iwasaki's leadership in the late 1800s, Mitsubishi diversified its business into insurance (Tokio Marine Insurance Company and Meiji Life Insurance Company), mining (Takashima Coal Mine) and shipbuilding. Following his death in 1885, his successor Yanosuke Iwasaki merged the shipping operation with a rival enterprise to form the Nippon Yusen Kaisha (NYK) and refocused Mitsubishi's business on coal and copper mining. In 1918, the group's international trading business was spun off to form Mitsubishi Shoji Kaisha. Mitsubishi Goshi Kaisha served as the parent company of the group through World War II, during which group company Mitsubishi Heavy Industries (launched in 1934) produced ships, aircraft and heavy machinery for the war effort.

=== 1945–present ===
After the war, the administration of Douglas MacArthur called for the dissolution of the "zaibatsu" corporations that dominated the Japanese economy. Mitsubishi was the only major zaibatsu to initially refuse this request, at the orders of the president Koyata Iwasaki, who shortly thereafter fell seriously ill. Mitsubishi eventually dissolved in 1947, and under restrictive rules imposed by the occupation authorities, the employees of the Mitsubishi Shoji trading arm rebranded into 100 separate companies. Beginning in 1950, the restrictions on re-consolidation of the zaibatsu were eased, and by 1952 most of the former Mitsubishi Shoji had coalesced into three companies.

The current Mitsubishi Corporation was founded by the merger of these three companies to form Mitsubishi Shoji Kaisha, Ltd. in 1954; Mitsubishi listed on the Tokyo Stock Exchange and Osaka Stock Exchange in the same year. It changed its name to "Mitsubishi Corporation" in 1971. Concurrently with its relaunch, Mitsubishi opened fourteen liaison offices outside Japan, as well as a US subsidiary called Mitsubishi International Corporation with offices in New York and San Francisco. By 1960, Mitsubishi had fifty-one overseas offices. Mitsubishi's first large-scale investment outside Japan was a liquefied natural gas project in Brunei, committed to in 1968.

Along with Mitsubishi Bank, Mitsubishi Corporation played a central role in international trading for other constituents of the former Mitsubishi zaibatsu during the postwar era, such as Mitsubishi Heavy Industries and the Mitsubishi Motor Company, forming a major keiretsu business group centered around the Second Friday Conference (Kinyo-kai) of company managers.

In March 1998 the Mitsubishi Corporation received the quarterly Greenwash Award, which alleged that it falsely portrayed its business operations as environmentally friendly. As of 2009, Mitsubishi held between 35% and 40% of the worldwide market for bluefin tuna.

In the 1950s Mitsubishi showed interest in the iron mining business in Chile which boomed after an export ban was lifted and tax cuts were introduced for iron mining. The corporation proceeded in 1958 to purchase the iron ore deposit of Adrianitas in Atacama Region. This proved a failure as there was no mineral reserve estimation at the time of the purchase and Mitsubishi's later exploration showed them to be much smaller than originally thought. In 1985 Mitsubishi Corporation inaugurated an era of Japanese investment in the Chilean copper mining industry by investing in Minera Escondida. Until 2010 Mitsubishi Corporation owned 50% of Compañia Minera Huasco which operated the iron mine of Los Colorados in Chile. Compañia Minera Huasco was merged into Compañía Minera del Pacífico (CMP) in 2010 and Mitsubishi Corporation obtained a 25% ownership of CMP; 15.9% by the folding and 9.1% by capital injection to CMP. In 2011 Anglo American plc sold a 24.5% stake of copper mining company Anglo American Sur to Mitsubishi Corporation as part of a maneuver to hinder Codelco taking control of a 49% stake.

By 2015 Mitsubishi was again the top-ranked general trading company by net earnings. However, Mitsubishi saw its first postwar net loss in the fiscal year ended March 2016, amid a slowdown in the Chinese economy and a slump in the commodity markets, causing Mitsubishi to lose its #1 position to Itochu.

In November, 2019, Mitsubishi Corporation stated that it will buy Eneco, a company that focuses on renewable energy, in a deal valuing the Dutch energy firm at $4.52 billion.

Berkshire Hathaway acquired over 5% of the stock in the company, along with four other Japanese trading houses, over the 12-month period ending in August 2020.

In February 2024, TVS Mobility, a distribution and after-sales company, entered into a joint venture with Mitsubishi. TVS Mobility will be renamed TVS Vehicle Mobility Solution (TVS VMS), Mitsubishi will take a 32% stake in the new business by investing ₹300 crore (₹3 billion) and will enter the Indian automotive market.

In December 2024, Mitsubishi Corporation reported a financial loss due to unauthorized trading activities. The company's Singapore-based petroleum unit, Petro-Diamond Singapore, incurred losses of approximately $90 million (13.2 billion yen) from derivatives trading. This incident occurred when a trader who was responsible for crude oil derivatives for China allegedly manipulated the unit's risk management system and conducted unauthorized trades since January. Mitsubishi Corporation stated that they discovered the issue in mid-November during a routine middle office review. The trader in question was fired and reported to the police. The company has also filed a complaint against the trader and is considering taking further legal action.

Mitsubishi was the subject of a boycott by the Rainforest Action Network for its role in the destruction of rainforests through its forestry activities.

In July 2026, Mitsubishi Corporation completed its acquisition of shale-gas production and infrastructure assets from Aethon Energy Management in Texas and Louisiana. The acquisition had been announced in January at US$7.53 billion including debt, making it Mitsubishi Corporation's largest acquisition to date. The assets included natural-gas production in the Haynesville Shale region near LNG export infrastructure on the U.S. Gulf Coast.

== Business segments ==
Mitsubishi Corporation businesses are divided into eight business sections:

- Business Service Group: Focuses on information technology. Mitsubishi is the Japanese partner of Tata Consultancy Services and operates a data center in Mitaka, Tokyo.
- Global Environmental & Infrastructure Business Group: Handles transportation, water, electricity, and industrial projects. Its infrastructure projects include airports in Mandalay and Ulaanbataar, urban railways in Cairo, Doha and Dubai, and power projects under the Diamond Generating and Diamond Transmission names. In 2015, Mitsubishi announced a strategic alliance with Turkey's Çalık Enerji to boost its infrastructure business in Turkey and Northern Africa.
- Industrial Finance, Logistics and Development Group: Engages in asset management, asset financing, real estate and logistics.
- Energy Business Group: Handles trading and investment in crude oil, liquefied natural gas, liquefied petroleum gas, shale gas, biofuel, and other energy commodities in various countries.
- Metals Group: Develops concessions and trades in coal, iron ore, nickel, chrome, copper, aluminum, uranium and platinum. In 2014, Mitsubishi opened a $3.4 billion coking coal mine in Caval Ridge, Queensland, Australia, through its 50% shareholding in the BHP Mitsubishi Alliance.
- Machinery Group: Sells heavy machinery, ships, defense equipment, and motor vehicles (particularly for Isuzu).
- Chemicals Group: Manufactures and trades in a wide variety of commodity and functional chemicals, especially petrochemicals.
- Living Essentials Group: Develops and trades in consumer products and manages retailing operations; investor in Lawson and Alfamart.

Of these segments, energy is the largest by far, accounting for almost half of the company's consolidated net income in the first half of the fiscal year 2015.

== Awards ==
In 2008, Mitsubishi Corporation was crowned In-House of the Year - Trading Company In-House Team of the Year at the 2008 ALB Japan Law Awards.

In 2023, the company’s seat in Forbes Global 2000 was 75.
