= Iwasaki Yatarō =

Japanese industrialist (1835–1885)

- 岩崎弥太郎
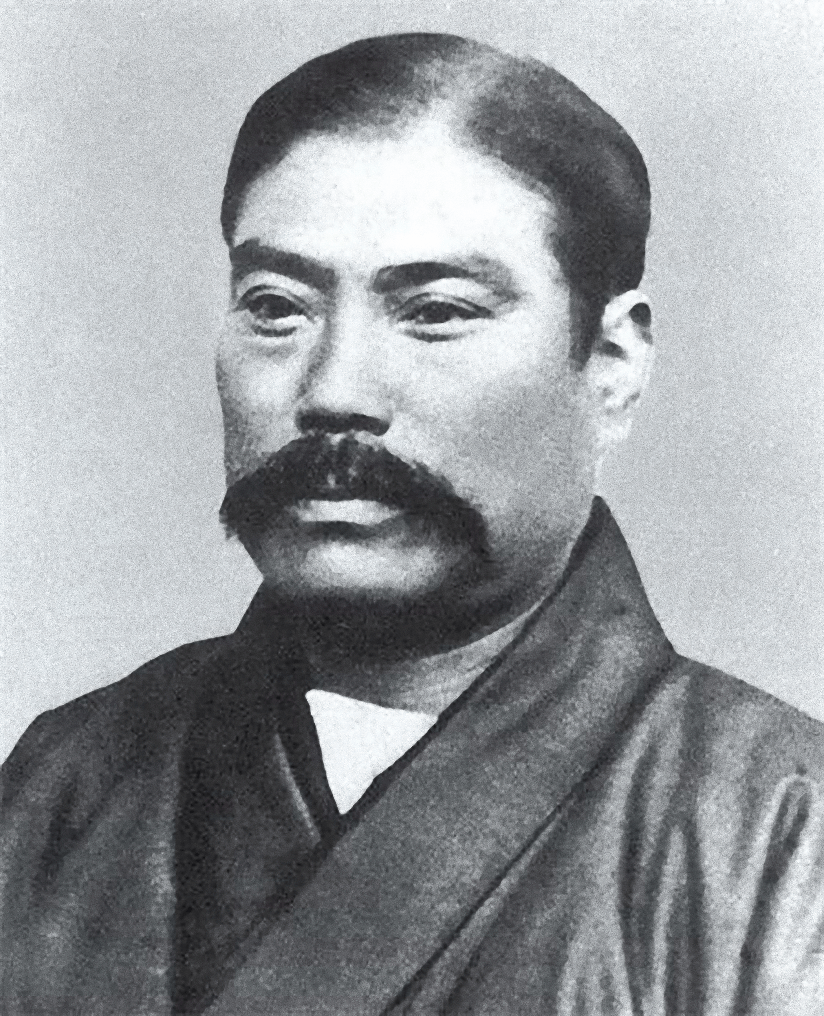
- Born: January 9, 1835; Aki, Tosa Province, Japan
- Died: February 7, 1885 (aged 50); Tokyo, Japan
- Occupation: Industrialist
- Known for: Founder of Mitsubishi

Japanese name
- Kyūjitai: 岩崎 彌太郎
- Shinjitai: 岩崎 弥太郎
Transcriptions
- Romanization: Iwasaki Yatarō

Iwasaki Yatarō (岩崎 弥太郎; January 9, 1835 – February 7, 1885) was a Japanese industrialist and financier known as the founder of Mitsubishi, one of Japan's largest conglomerates.

== Early life ==
Yatarō Iwasaki was born on 9 January 1835 in Aki, Tosa Province (now Kōchi Prefecture) into a provincial farming family. Iwasaki's family had been members of the samurai warrior nobility, but his great great grandfather, Iwasaki Yajiemon (岩崎弥次右衛門) had sold off his family's samurai status in obligation of debts during the Great Tenmei famine. His family derived from the Iwasaki clan, a branch of the Takeda clan of Kai Province (甲斐武田氏). The ancestor of the Iwasaki clan was Iwasaki Nobutaka (岩崎信隆) known as Takeda Shichirō (武田七郎), who was the fifth son of Takeda Nobumitsu. The Iwasaki clan served the Aki clan (安芸氏) and the Chōsokabe clan (長宗我部氏) at the Battle of Sekigahara (October 21, 1600).

Iwasaki began his career as an employee of the Yamauchi clan, the ruling clan of the Tosa Domain which had business interests in many parts of Japan. Iwasaki left for Edo aged nineteen for his education, but his studies were interrupted a year later when his father was seriously injured in a dispute with the village headman. Iwasaki accused the local magistrate of corruption for refusing to hear his case, and was subsequently sent to prison for seven months after he was kicked out from his village. After his release, Iwasaki was without a permanent job for a time before finding work as a tutor. Iwasaki returned to Edo, where he socialised with political activists and studied under the Yoshida Tōyō, a reformist and modernization advocate from Tosa Province. Yoshida was employed by Yamauchi Toyoshige, the daimyō (lord) of the Tosa Domain, and he influenced Iwasaki with ideas of opening and developing the then-closed Japan through industry and foreign trade. Iwasaki found work as a clerk for the Yamauchi government through Yoshida, and eventually bought back his family's samurai status. Iwasaki was promoted to the top position at the Yamauchi clan's trading office in Nagasaki in Hizen Province, responsible for trading camphor oil and paper to buy ships, weapons, and ammunition.

== Mitsubishi ==
(Left): Mon (family crest) of the Yamauchi inspired the logo of Mitsubishi (right)

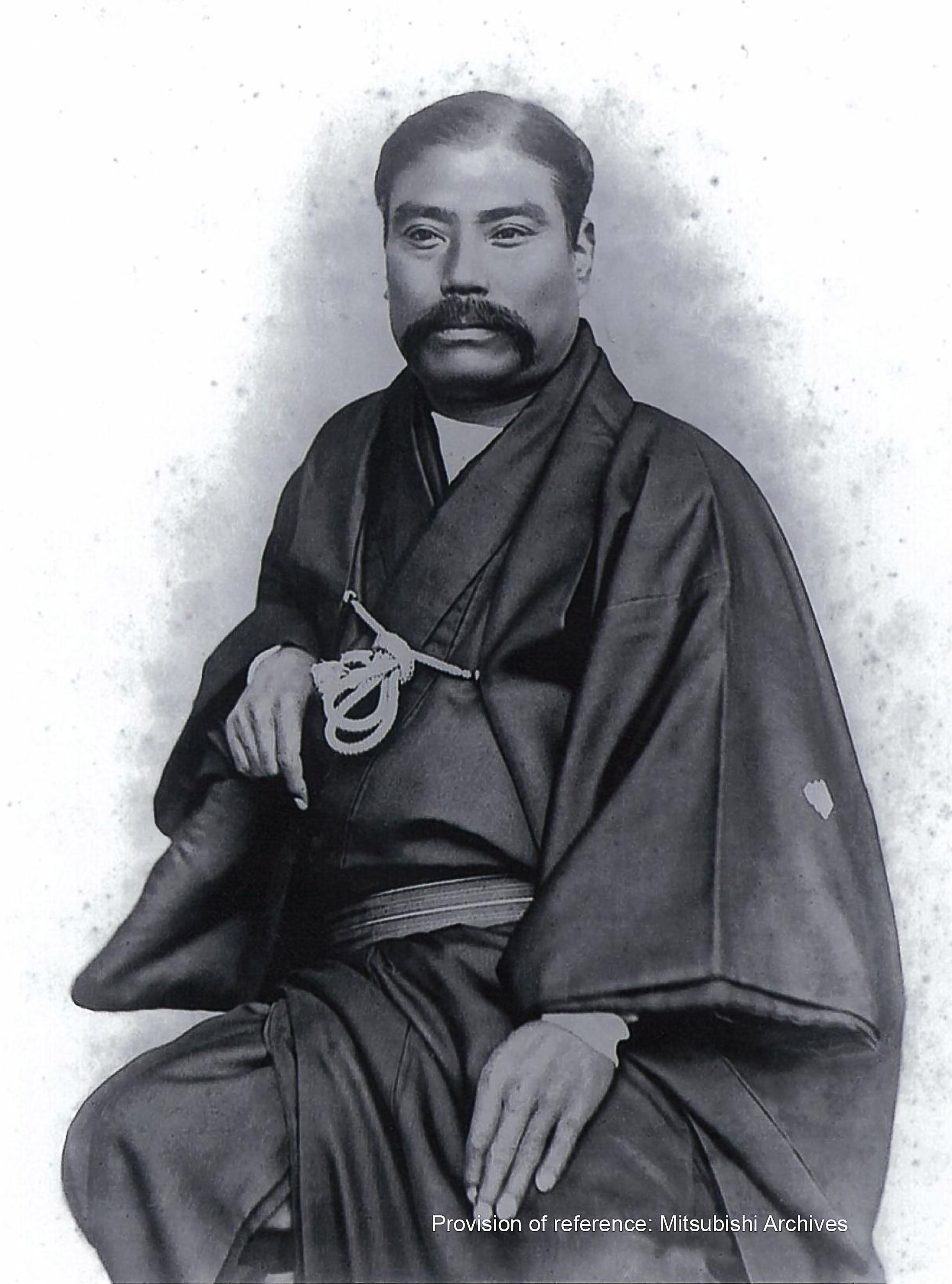
Iwasaki Yataro, c. 1870s

Iwasaki travelled to Osaka following the Meiji Restoration in 1868 which overthrew the ruling Tokugawa Shogunate, abolishing the feudal system in Japan and forcing the disbandment of the shogunate's business interests. In March 1870, Iwasaki became president of the Tsukumo Trading Company, a shipping company founded on behalf of the Yamauchi clan, and leased the trading rights. In 1873, the company changed its name to Mitsubishi, a compound of mitsu ("three") and hishi (literally, "water caltrop", often used in Japanese to denote a rhombus or diamond). Mitsubishi's emblem was a combination of the Iwasaki family crest, showing three overlapping lozenges, and the crest with three oak leaves, arranged in a threefold rotational symmetry, of the Yamauchi family, which controlled the part of Shikoku where Yatarō was born.

From 1874 to 1875, Iwasaki was contracted by the Japanese government to transport Japanese soldiers and war materials. The Japanese government purchased a number of ships for the Japanese Expedition of 1874 to Taiwan against the Paiwan Aborigines in southeast Taiwan, and these ships were later given to Mitsubishi after the expedition was finished in 1875. This created strong links between Mitsubishi and the Japanese government that ensured the new company's success. In return, Mitsubishi supported the new Japanese government and transported troops who defeated the Satsuma Rebellion in 1877. Thus, the success of Mitsubishi became intertwined with the rise of the modern Japanese state and economy and one of the "Big Four" zaibatsu companies. In 1885, a merger of Mitsubishi shipping activities with competitor Kyodo Unyu Kaisha (founded 1882) led to the adoption of the company's name Nippon Yusen Kabushiki Kaisha, or 'NYK' in short, which still exists and is one of the largest global shipping groups.

Subsequently, Iwasaki invested in mining, ship repair, and finance industries in addition to shipping. In 1884, Iwasaki took a lease on the Nagasaki Shipyard, which allowed the company to undertake shipbuilding on a large scale and renamed it the Nagasaki Shipyard & Machinery Works, which are now part of its Mitsubishi Heavy Industries industrial branch.

Iwasaki often held dinners for dignitaries, spending a huge amount of money on these occasions, but he also made many friends who later helped him by doing favors.

== Death ==
Iwasaki died of stomach cancer on 7 February 1885, aged 50, and was succeeded as the head of the family business first by his brother, Iwasaki Yanosuke, and later his son, Hisaya. In 1903, Iwasaki's fourth daughter, Masako, married Baron Kijūrō Shidehara, the first Prime Minister of Japan after World War II.

== Popular culture ==
Iwasaki serves as the secondary protagonist of the 49th NHK Taiga drama, Ryōma den, focusing on his activities during the Bakumatsu, and also serves as the framing narrator of the story. He is portrayed by Teruyuki Kagawa.

== See also ==
- Thomas Blake Glover
- Kiyosumi Garden

== Sources ==
- Jones, Geoffrey Gareth, Masako Egawa, and Mayuka Yamazaki. "Yataro Iwasaki: Founding Mitsubishi (A)." (Harvard Business School Case 808-158, 2009).
- Miyajawa, Takayasu. "Hisaya Iwasaki and the Wharton School." Japanese Yearbook on Business History 16 (2000): 91-112. online
- "The Man Who Started It All", Mitsubishi.com
- "The Mitsubishi Mark", Mitsubishi.com
- "The origin of MHI can be traced all the way back to 1884", MHI-ir.jp
- Weston, Mark (July 1999). Giants of Japan: The Lives of Japan's Greatest Men and Women. New York: Kodansha America. ISBN 1-56836-286-2.
- Woy, Jean L. (2005). The Human Record: Sources of Global History. Boston: Houghton Mifflin Company. pp. 353–356. ISBN 0-618-04247-4.
- Yamamura, Kozo (Summer 1967). "The Founding of Mitsubishi: A Case Study in Japanese Business History". The Business History Review. 41 (2): 141–160. doi:10.2307/3112564. JSTOR 3112564. S2CID 156454000.
