= Nagamori =

Nagamori may refer to:

== Places ==
- Asaka-Nagamori Station a junction railway station in the city of Kōriyama
- Nagamori Castle a castle built in Mino Province
- Nagamori Station a railway station on the Takayama Main Line in the city of Gifu

== People ==
- Shigenobu Nagamori, CEO of Nidec, a manufacturer of micromotors
- Mashita Nagamori, a daimyō of the Azuchi–Momoyama period
- Ogasawara Nagamori, was the 8th (and final) daimyō of Echizen-Katsuyama Domain

== Other uses ==
- Nagamori Awards, is an international award given by Nagamori Foundation of Kyoto, Japan
- 16587 Nagamori is a minor planet
