= Kyū-Iwasaki-tei Garden =

Historic estate in Taitō, Tokyo, Japan

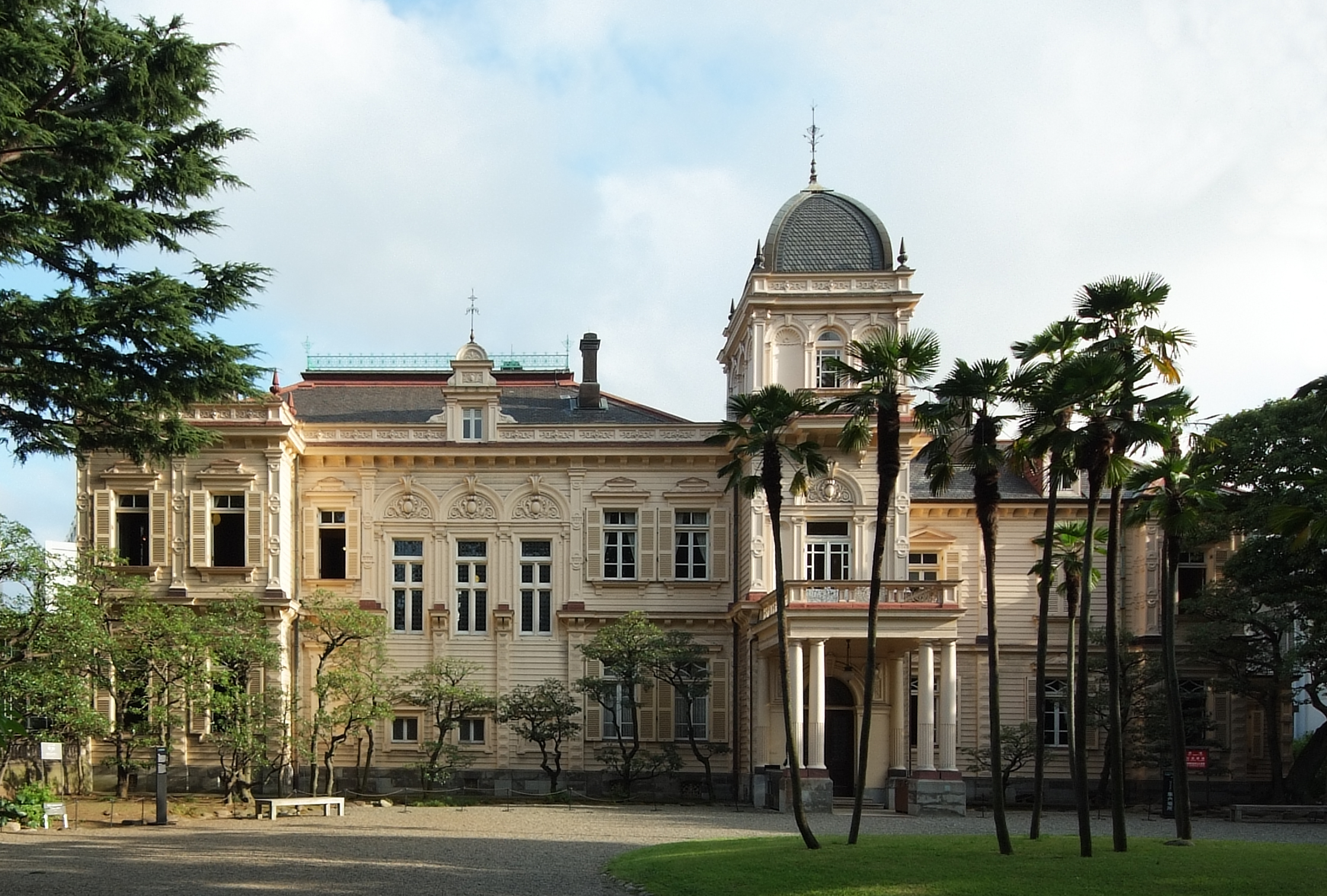
- Western-style residence, the former Iwasaki Family House
- Interactive map of Kyū-Iwasaki-tei Garden
- Location: Taitō, Tokyo, Japan
- Coordinates: 35.709727°N 139.767616°E
- Area: 16,912.88 square metres (182,048.7 ft^{2})
- Created: 1 October 2001

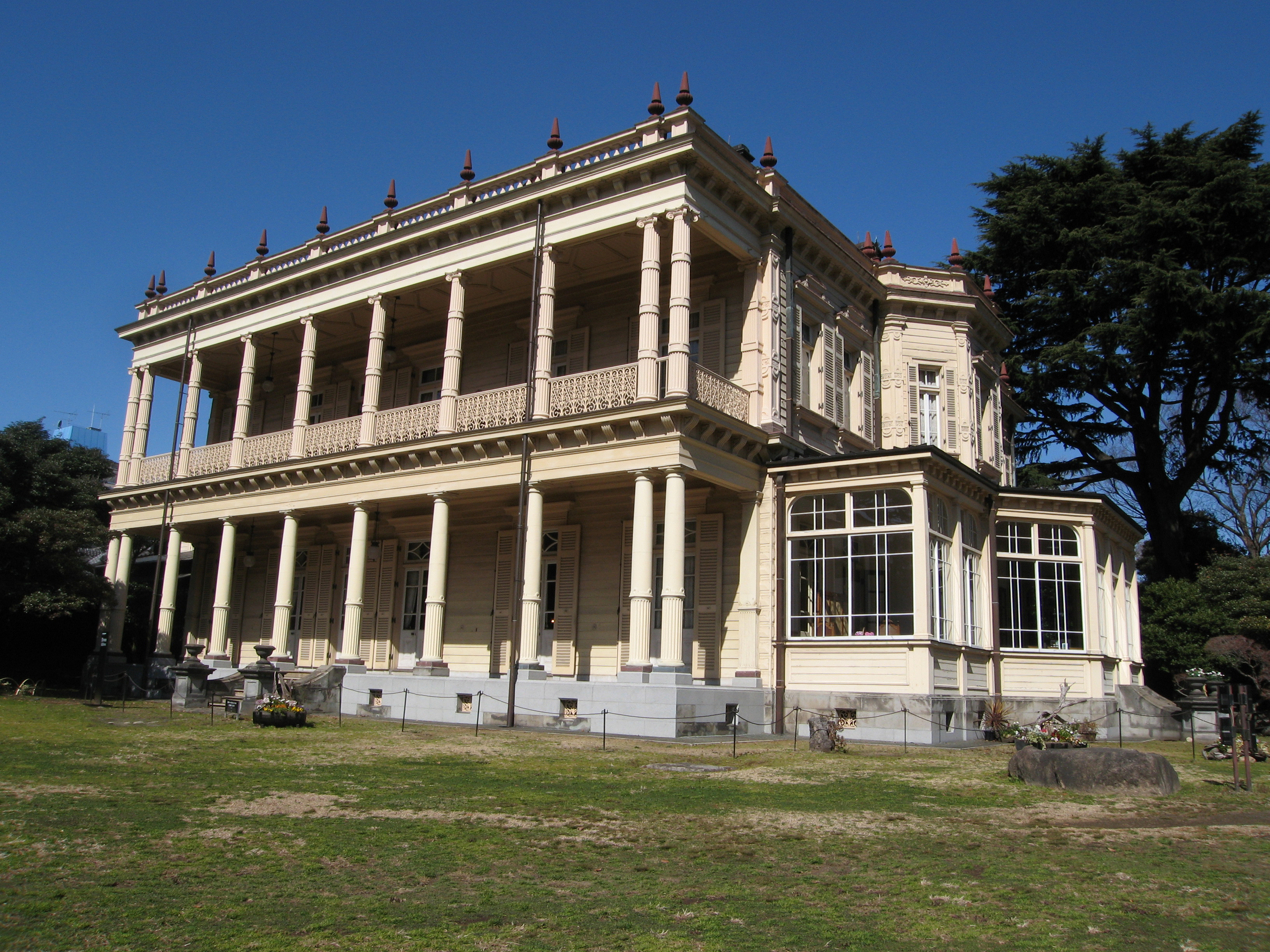
Southern side of Western-style residence

Kyū-Iwasaki-tei Garden (旧岩崎邸庭園, Kyū-Iwasaki-tei teien; Gardens of Old Iwasaki Mansion) is located in Taitō, Tokyo. It is the former estate of the Iwasaki clan who were the founders of Mitsubishi. The premises have three buildings: a Western-style house designed by British architect Josiah Conder, a Japanese house and a billiard house, and cover an area of about 17,000 square metres.

== History ==
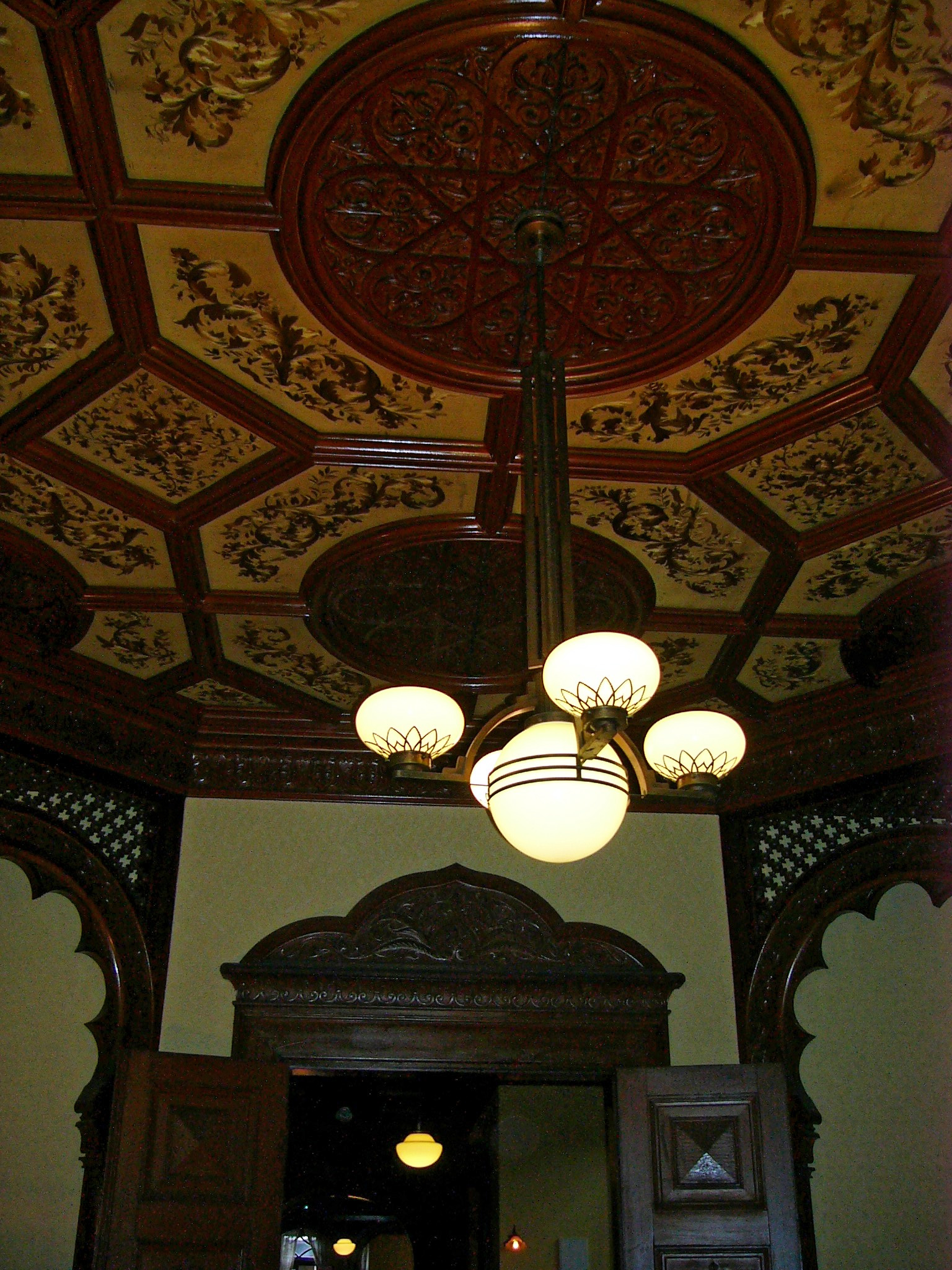
Interior of Western-style residence

The grounds were originally owned by the Sakakibara family of the Echigo Takada Clan in the Edo period, and were the site of their Edo residence. The property passed to the Makino family of the Maizuru clan in the early Meiji era. In 1896, Hisaya Iwasaki, son of the founder of the Mitsubishi group, Yataro Iwasaki, purchased this land — three years after becoming Mitsubishi's third president. The premises became the official residence of the Iwasaki family.

Hisaya Iwasaki hired the British architect, Josiah Conder, who designed a two-story Western-style main building and the Swiss-style billiards house. The whole project actually consisted of more than 20 buildings on 49,500 m^{2} property.

After World War II, the residence was confiscated by the Supreme Commander of the Allied Powers and after it was returned it was used as the Judicial Research and Training Institute of the Supreme Court until 1970.

Of all that was built, only the Western-style mansion, the billiards house, and one Japanese-style structure remain — victim first to the Liberation of Japan, but more to the Japanese Department of Justice, which demolished nearly all the Japanese-style housing. The present grounds are now less than half their original size.

In 1961, the main mansion was saved by being recognized as an Important Cultural Asset status. This was extended to the whole property in 1999. Since 2001, it has been administered by the Tokyo metropolitan government.

== Buildings ==
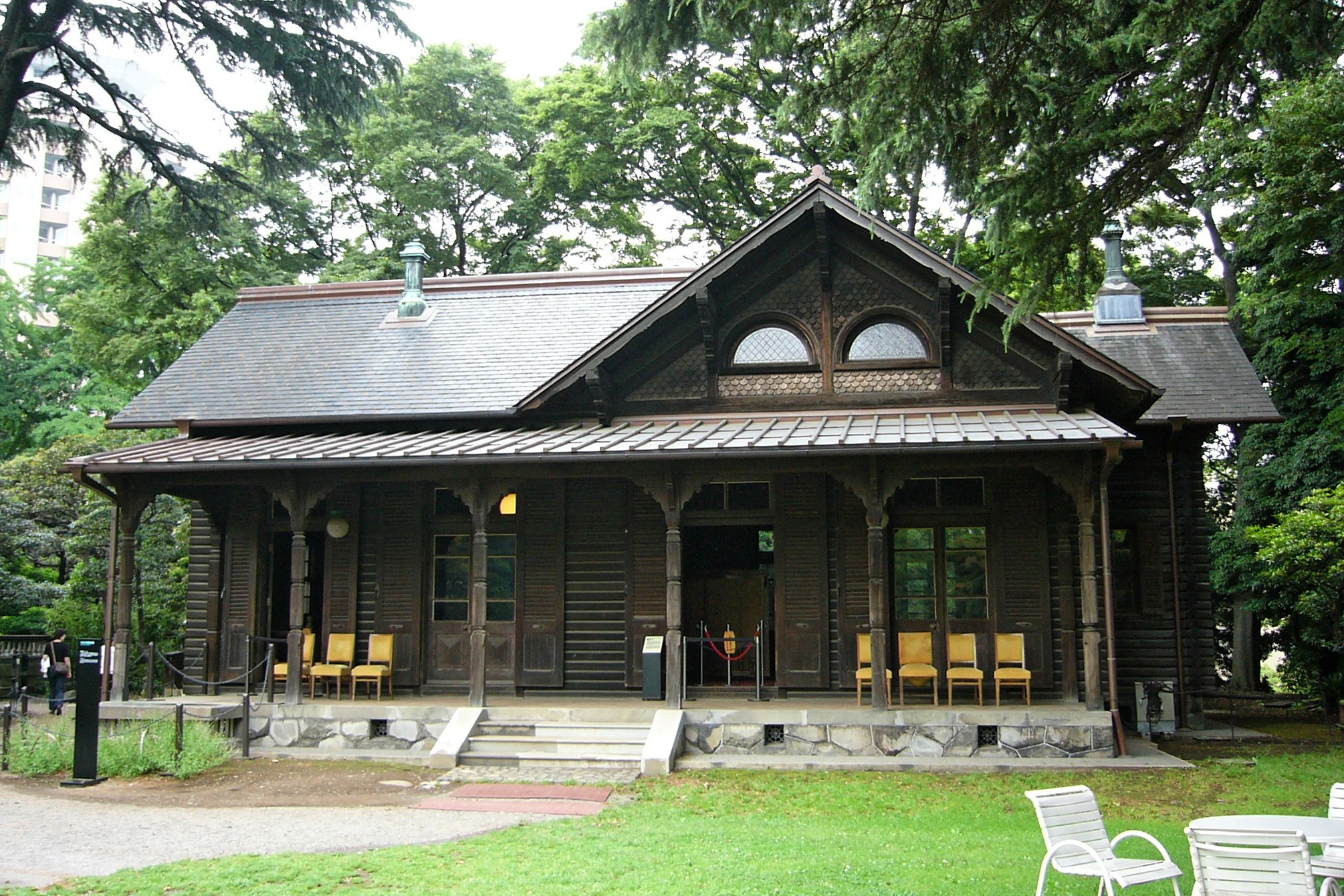
Billiards house

Western-style residence is a two-story building constructed of wood that also has a cellar. The design is based on the Jacobean style of England in the 17th century, which incorporates Islamic motifs of the Renaissance. On the south side of the building, there is a veranda with a colonnade. The second-story colonnade is in the Ionian style of the Pennsylvania country house. The reason is that Hisaya Iwasaki had just graduated from the University of Pennsylvania.

The house features Kinkarakami (金唐紙) or Kinkarakawashi (金唐革紙) wallpaper featuring a golden and turquoise floral decoration. It is a Japanese type of washi paper using the technique of metal foil applied through a woodblock roll and hammered with a brush, and has the appearance of coloured leather. This technique was developed in Japan and exported to Europe.

Billiards house was designed to be reminiscent of a Swiss mountain chalet, a style very rarely seen in Japan. This building is made completely of wood, it features log walls with carved pillars and a roof with protruding eaves, a design that shows signs of Gothic style. It is connected to the main residence by an underground passageway.

Japanese-style building was integrated with the Western-style residence. At the time the building was completed, the total floor space amounted to 1,815 m^{2}, making it nearly comparable in size to the Western-style building. There exist screens and fusuma sliding door paintings done by a well-known painter of the period, Hashimoto Gahō. Originally the Japanese-style residence was once made of seven different buildings and was significantly larger than the Western-style residence.

The garden may now be little more than a lawn. The elements in the garden that still exist from the Edo period include some stone monuments, lanterns and a stone hand-washing basin.

The garden is about 3 minutes' walk from Yushima Station.

== See also ==
- Kiyosumi Garden
- Former Tanaka Family Residence
- Ogasawara-Hakushaku-Tei
