= Nagamori Awards =

International electrical power engineering award

- Awarded for: Recognize outstanding researchers and engineers in electrical power engineering
- Sponsored by: Nagamori Foundation
- Date: 2014
- Location: Kyoto
- Country: Japan
- Website: https://www.nidec.com/en/nagamori-f/

The Nagamori Award is an international award given by Nagamori Foundation of Kyoto, Japan. The award is to recognize outstanding researchers and engineers working on electrical and electronics engineering, especially related to motors, power generation, actuators, and energy related topics.

== History ==
The award was founded by Shigenobu Nagamori in 2014, with the purpose of recognizing global researchers and engineers who have made outstanding and innovative technological advances in the area of electrical motors and power generation.

== Awards details ==
The award is made annually to outstanding early to mid-career researchers and engineers. There will be six awards given annually, with one of the awards named as the Grand Nagamori award. The prize money of two million yen is awarded to each regular Nagamori award while the grand award comes with a cash prize of five million yen. An award ceremony is held in Kyoto, Japan around September each year, where winners will be present to receive their prizes.

== Recent winners ==
The following are some of the recent winners.

Grand Nagamori Award Winners
Year	Name	Contributions
2022	Gianmario Pellegrino	For synchronous and PM-synchronous reluctance motor drives - theory, design, and control methods
2021	Tom Oomen	For advanced motion control for precision mechatronics: identification, learning, and control
2020	Chris Gerada	For contributions to advancements in high performance electrical machines and their industrial application and uptake
2019	Takashi Kato	For improving efficiency of vehicle traction motors
2018	Bulent Sarlioglu	For pioneering high efficiency and high density classical electric motors
2017	Yoshitaka Iwaji	For contributions to control of synchronous permanent magnet motors
2016	Hiroshi Fujimoto	For contributions to improved safety and efficiency of electric vehicle motors
2015	Kan Akatsu	For contributions to high performance and low cost SR motors

Nagamori Award Winners
Year	Name	Contributions
2022	Huijun Gao	For contributions to the advanced control for mechatronic systems
2022	Yunwei Ryan Li	For contribution to the PWM, control and converter topology of medium voltage high power industrial drives
2022	Burak Ozpineci	For low cost, high efficiency, compact electric motor drives for more electrified transportation systems
2022	Maryam Saeedifard	For contributions to highly-efficient, power-dense and fault-tolerant multilevel converter-based medium-voltage drives
2022	Akio Yamamoto	For pioneering research and development on theoretical models and applied systems for electrostatic film actuators
2021	Tobias Geyer	For research in and industrial productization of predictive control methods maximizing the power and efficiency of electrical drives
2021	Leila Parsa	For multi-phase permanent magnet motors, design, analysis, and control
2021	Ronghai Qu	For flux modulation machines – theory, topologies, and applications
2021	Akshay Kumar Rathore	For optimal extremely low switching frequency control of medium voltage high power industrial motor drives
2021	Jun Ueda	For cellular actuators inspired by biological muscles and their human assistive applications
2020	Yasuhisa Hirata	For development of motion control technology for passive robot using servo brake actuators for high safety and low power consumption
2020	Alireza Khaligh	For pioneering research and development on design and control of high-efficiency and high-power-density electric-motor-integrated wide bandgap power electronics
2020	Shihua Li	For contributions to the nonlinear modeling, analysis and multi-disturbance rejection control solution for precise motion control systems
2020	Annette Muetze	For increasing the reliability, efficiency, and utilization of variable speed drive systems
2020	Jin Wang	For leading-edge research and development of wide bandgap power device based electric machine drives
2019	Radu Bojoi	For contributions to electrical drives control
2019	Ayman M. EL-Refaie	For contributions to high speed permanent magnet machines
2019	Mohammad S. Islam	For contributions to electric motors and electromagnetic actuators
2019	Jianxin Shen	For contributions to permanent magnet electrical machines
2019	Bram Vanderborght	For contributions to self-healing actuators with applications in health and manufacturing
2018	Jose Alfonso Antonino Daviu	For contributions to advanced fault diagnostic techniques for reliable conditioning of electric motors
2018	Jun-ichi Itoh	For contributions to the development of technology for adjustable speed drive system
2018	Seiichiro Katsura	For contributions to integrated design and application of motion control
2018	Hiroshi Toshiyoshi	For contributions to industrial applications of MEMS actuators
2018	Bin Yao	For contributions to adaptive robust control of high performance mechatronic systems
2017	Takashi Abe	For contributions to the development of a variable field flux motor
2017	Satomi Hattori	For contributions to the development of high efficiency low vibration motors
2017	Makoto Iwasaki	For contributions to the development of high precision and position techniques for mechatronic systems
2017	Masaharu Komori	For contributions to rotation transmission mechanism
2017	Minh C. Ta	For contributions to control techniques for improved performance and efficiency of electric motor drives
2017	Masatsugu Takemoto	For contributions to high performance and high functionality motors
2017	Kanokvate Tungpimolrut	For contributions to motor drive system development
2016	Jumpei Arata	For contributions to embedded elasticity mechanism and applications to medicine and industry
2016	Elena Andreevna Lomonova	For contributions to advanced multi-degrees permanent magnet actuation and vibration isolation
2016	Tomoaki Mashimo	For contributions to micro ultrasonic motors
2016	Taketsune Nakamura	For contributions to high-temperature superconducting induction synchronous motors
2016	Atsushi Nishikawa	For contributions to the design of medical actuator and endoscopic robot for minimally invasive surgery
2015	Wolfgang Gruber	For contributions to design, optimization and manufacturing of bearingless slice motor topologies
2015	Yasuhisa Hasegawa	For contributions to clinical applications of upper limb support for disabled patients
2015	Chun-Yu Hsiao	For contributions to design of high performance permanent magnet synchronous motors
2015	Takeshi Morita	For contributions to basic driving principles of piezoelectric actuators
2015	Omar Scaglione	For contributions to iron hysteresis and enhanced Kalman filter for synchronous motors
