= Iwasaki =

Iwasaki (岩崎 or 岩﨑, "rock peninsula") is a Japanese surname. Notable people with the surname include:

- Akiko Iwasaki (岩崎 明子; born 1970), Japanese immunobiologist
- Akira Iwasaki (岩崎 昶; 1903–1981), Japanese film critic and producer
- Ayato Iwasaki (岩崎 有矢斗; born 2004), Japanese racing driver
- Carl Iwasaki (1961–2024), American college baseball coach
- Chihiro Iwasaki (岩崎 知弘; 1918–1974), Japanese illustrator
- Emiko Iwasaki (岩崎 恵美子; born 1976), Japanese video game artist
- Fukuzo Iwasaki (岩崎 福三; 1925–2012), Japanese real estate magnate and chairman of Iwasaki Sangyo Group
- Hidenori Iwasaki (岩崎 英則; born 1971), Japanese video game music composer
- Hiromi Iwasaki (岩崎 宏美; born 1958), Japanese singer
- Hiroshi Iwasaki (岩崎 ひろし; born 1953), Japanese actor and voice actor
- Kaori Iwasaki (岩崎 香; born 1969), Japanese swimmer
- Kyoko Iwasaki (岩崎 恭子; born 1978), former breaststroke swimmer
- Makoto Iwasaki (岩崎 誠; born 1964), Japanese engineer
- Masami Iwasaki (岩崎 征実; born 1971), Japanese voice actor
- Minako Iwasaki (岩崎 美奈子; born 1975), Japanese illustrator, game character designer and manga artist
- Mineko Iwasaki (岩崎峰子, 岩崎究香), Retired geiko (geisha)
- Pablo Larios Iwasaki, Mexican football goalkeeper
- Sebastian Iwasaki, Polish figure skater
- Shigeru Iwasaki (岩崎 茂; born 1953), Japanese general
- Shinichi Iwasaki (岩崎伸一; born 1968), Japanese ice hockey player
- Shun-ichi Iwasaki (岩崎 俊一; 1926–2025), Japanese engineer, researcher, winner of the "Japan Prize" in 2010
- Taisho Iwasaki (岩﨑 大昇; born 2002), a member of Japanese boy group, Bishounen, and actor
- Takizo Iwasaki (岩崎 瀧三; 1895–1965), Japanese businessman
- Taku Iwasaki (岩崎 琢; born 1968), Japanese composer
- Takuji Iwasaki (岩崎 卓爾; 1869–1937), Japanese meteorologist, biologist, ethnologist historian
- Takuya Iwasaki (岩崎 卓也; 1929–2018), Japanese archaeologist
- Tomás Iwasaki, Peruvian football forward
- Toshihiko Iwasaki (岩崎 利彦; born 1967), Japanese hurdler
- Iwasaki Tsunemasa (岩崎 常正; 1786–1842), Japanese botanist, zoologist and entomologist
- Iwasaki Yanosuke (岩崎 彌之助; 1851–1908), Japanese banker, businessman, investor, and politician
- Iwasaki Yatarō (岩崎 弥太郎; 1835–1885), founder of Mitsubishi
- Yohei Iwasaki (岩﨑 陽平; born 1987), Japanese footballer
- Yoshimi Iwasaki (岩崎 良美; born 1961), Japanese singer

== Fictional characters ==
- Minami Iwasaki of Lucky Star
- Ryuji Iwasaki of Tokumei Sentai Go-Busters
- Rio Iwasaki of Persona 3 Portable

== See also ==
- Iwatsu Electric, a Japanese electronics company
- Ishizaki
