= Kiyosumi Garden =

Traditional Japanese stroll garden in Fukagawa, Tokyo, Japan

Coordinates: 35°40′48″N 139°47′52″E

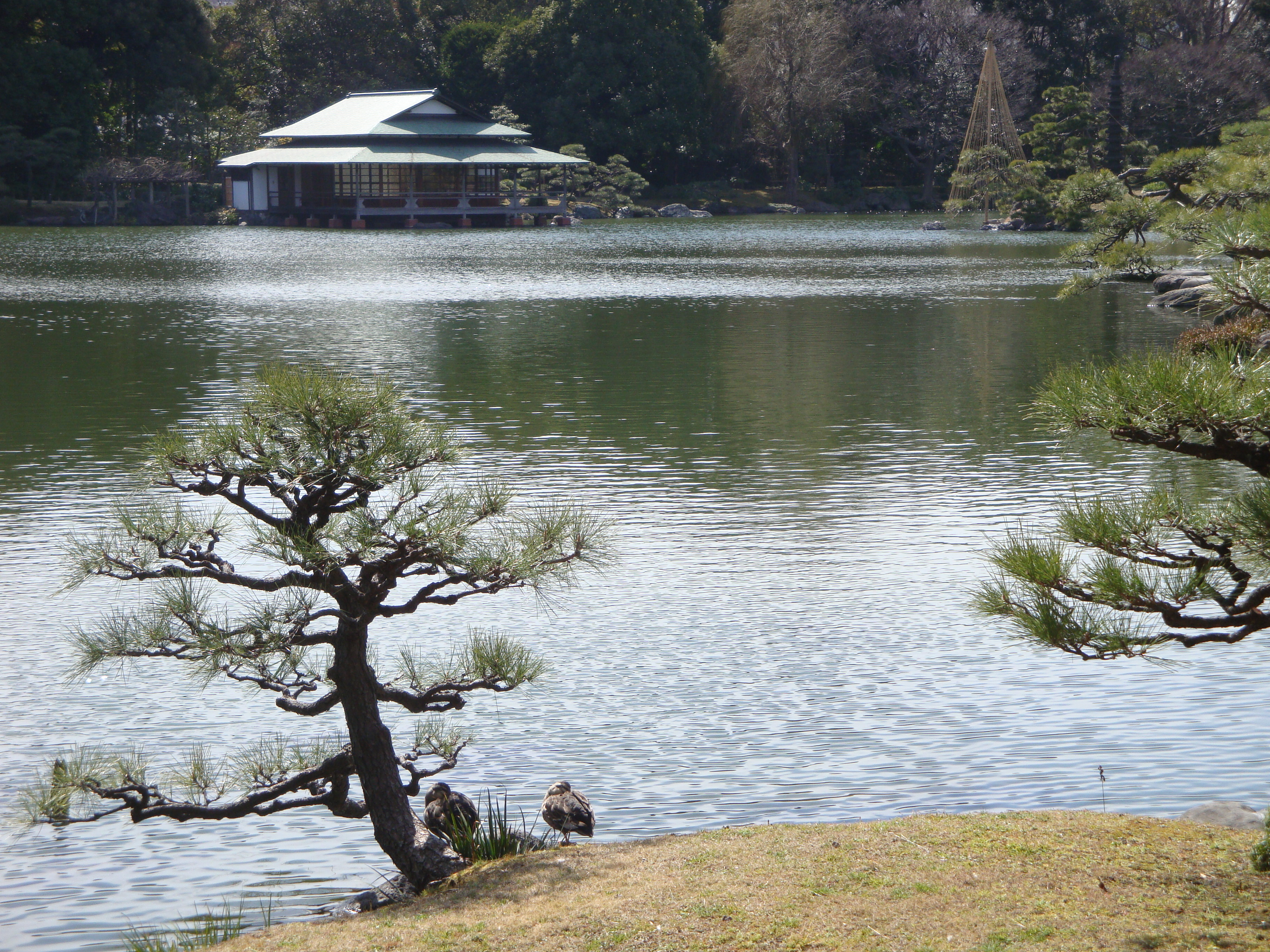
Kiyosumi Garden: the pond and tea house

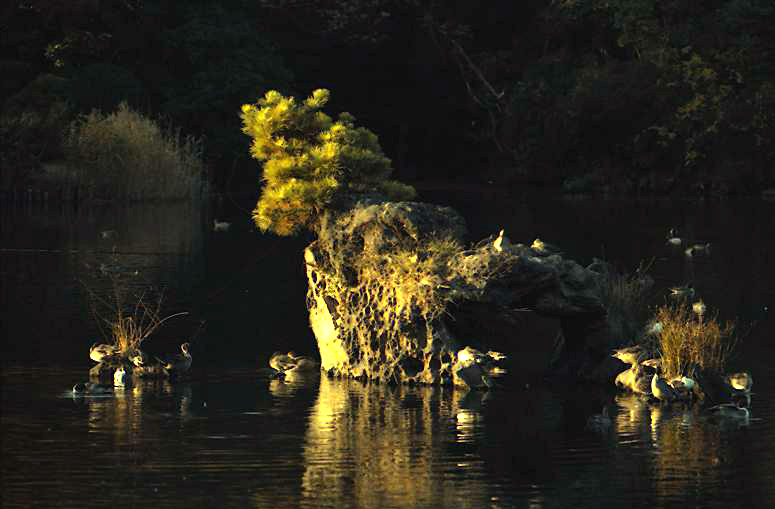
The Isle

Kiyosumi Garden (清澄庭園, Kiyosumi Teien) is a traditional Japanese stroll garden located in Fukagawa, Tokyo. It was constructed along classic principles in 1878–85, during the Meiji Period, by the shipping financier and industrialist Iwasaki Yatarō. By subtle hints in path construction and placement the visitor is led on a walk around the lake. Water-worn boulders were brought in from all over Japan, to give the garden its character; hills and dry waterfalls were constructed with them and two sequences of them form stepping-stones (isowatari) across small inlets of the lake, which almost completely fills the garden, allowing a pathway of many picturesque episodes around its perimeter. In fact only a narrow band of perimeter planting screens the garden from the structures along Kiyosumi Dori. There are three big islands and a teahouse on the pond. The garden covers an area of about 81,000 square metres.

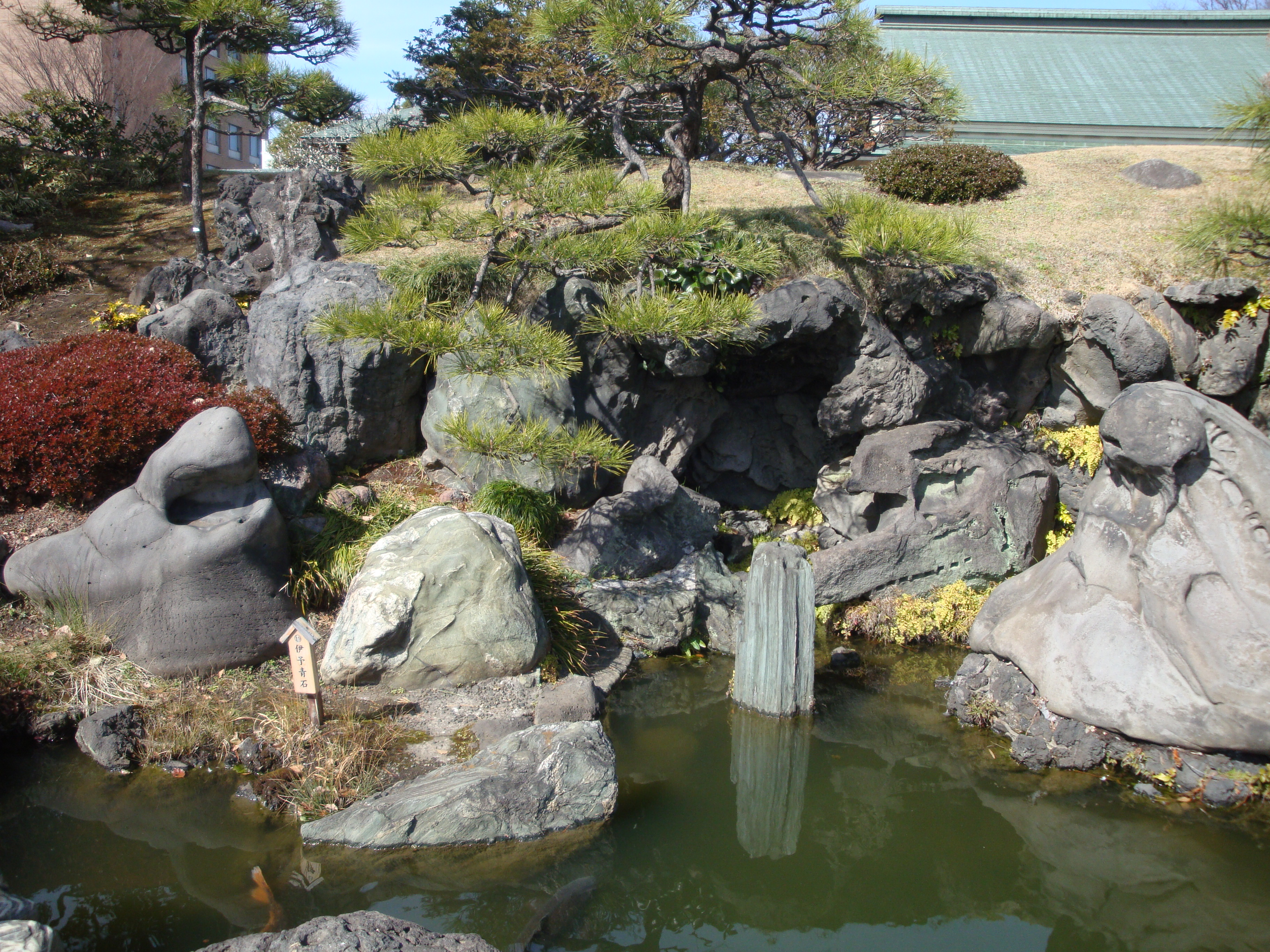
Rocks

== History ==
According to one theory, this garden was the part of the residence of the famous Edo-period business magnate, Kinokuniya Bunzaemon. In the Kyōhō era (1716–1736), it became the location of the Edo residence of the feudal lord Kuze Yamatonokami, of Sekiyamo, who built his mansion here in 1721 and this is the period when the basic form of the garden came into existence.

In the Meiji Era, Iwasaki Yatarō, the founder of Mitsubishi, acquired the land. In 1878, he ordered the garden rebuilt to use it for the enjoyment of his employees and entertainment of important guests. Hills and waterless waterfalls were constructed and 55 huge rocks from all over Japan were brought in. In 1880 the garden was opened. In later years, the waters of the Sumida-gawa were brought into the grounds to enlarge the pond.

The garden provided refuge for many citizens from the fires that followed the great earthquake of 1923. In 1932, Mitsubishi group contributed this garden to Tokyo City and after some repair works it was opened to the public in 1932. On March 31, 1979, this garden was designated as Tokyo Metropolitan Place of Scenic Beauty.

== Features ==
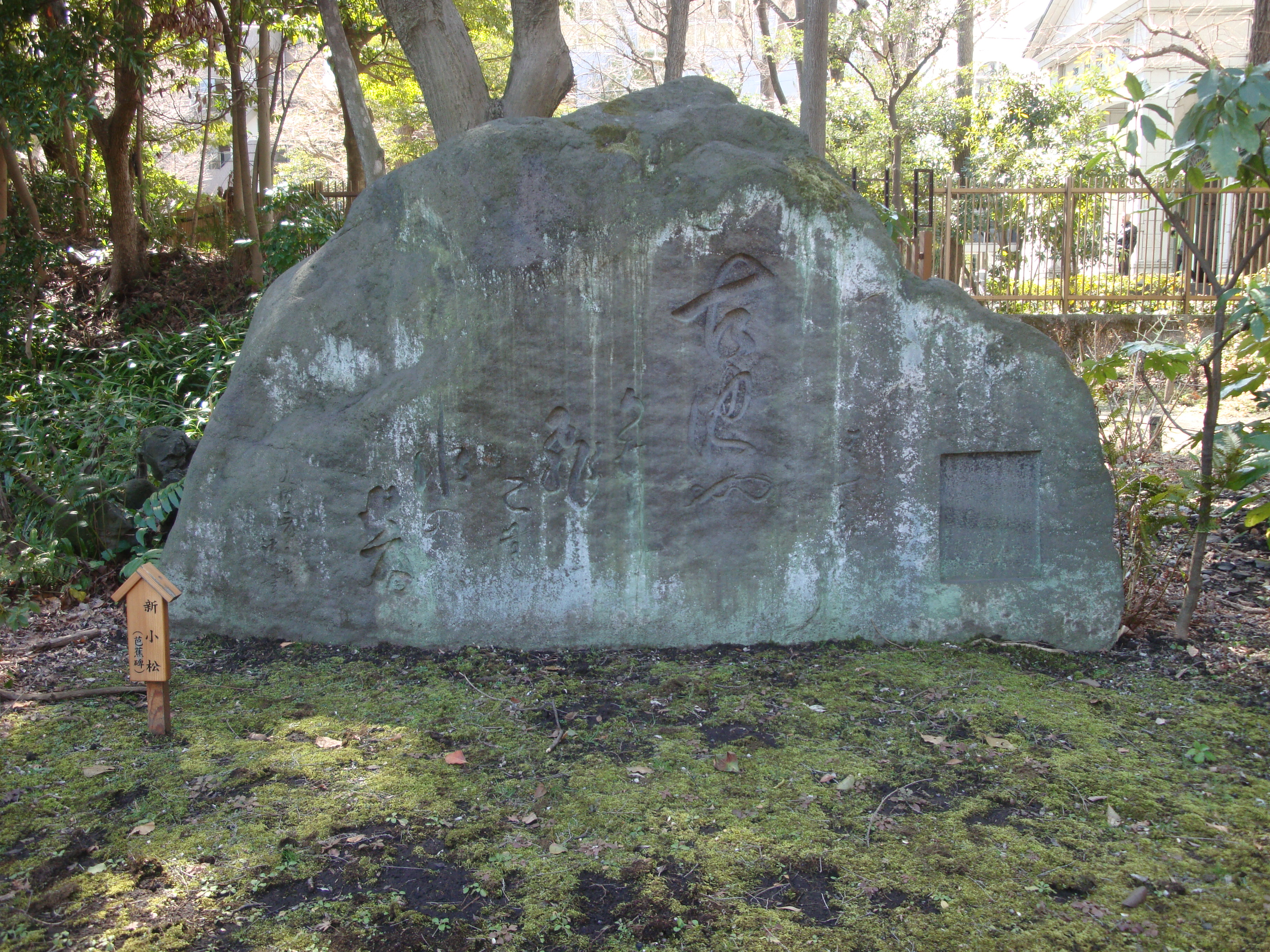
A haiku poem by Matsuo Bashō

The pond has three islands, one of which is connected with a bridge. There are iso-watari — this term refers to the stepping stone pathways that lead across shallow parts of the pond. When crossing the pond using iso-watari, one can view the fish in the pond. It teems with carp, turtles, and waterfowls. Its location near the river and the bay attracts a large number of birds. There are over 4000 trees in this constricted space. Japanese Black pine (Pinus thunbergii) are the dominant trees. Purple azaleas, Hydrangea macrophylla, Iris ensata and Taiwan cherry (Prunus campanulata) provide seasonal color.

The Iwasaki family collected stones from all over Japan, brought to Tokyo on their steamships and placed around the garden. Including the flagstones and iso-watari stones, the total number of stones used is immense and the garden can be perceived as a stone garden.

A famous haiku poem of Matsuo Bashō

"an ancient pond / a frog jumps in / the splash of water"

can be seen carved on the monument stone.

The park is located approximately 3 minutes' walk from Kiyosumi-shirakawa Station, on the Tokyo Metro Hanzōmon Line and the Toei Ōedo Line. It is open from 09:00 until 17:00, the entrance fee is 150 yen for adults.

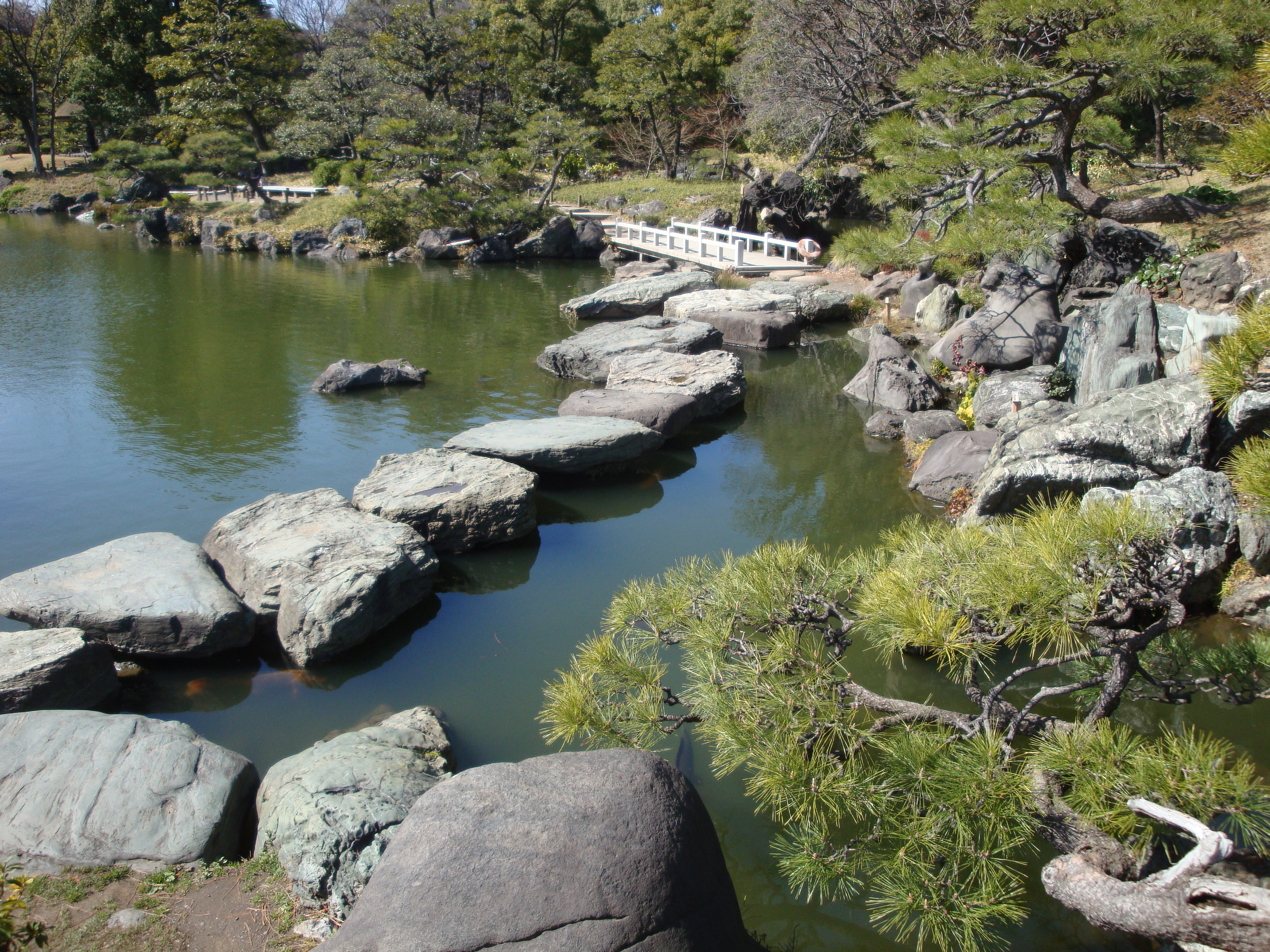
Step-stone bridge

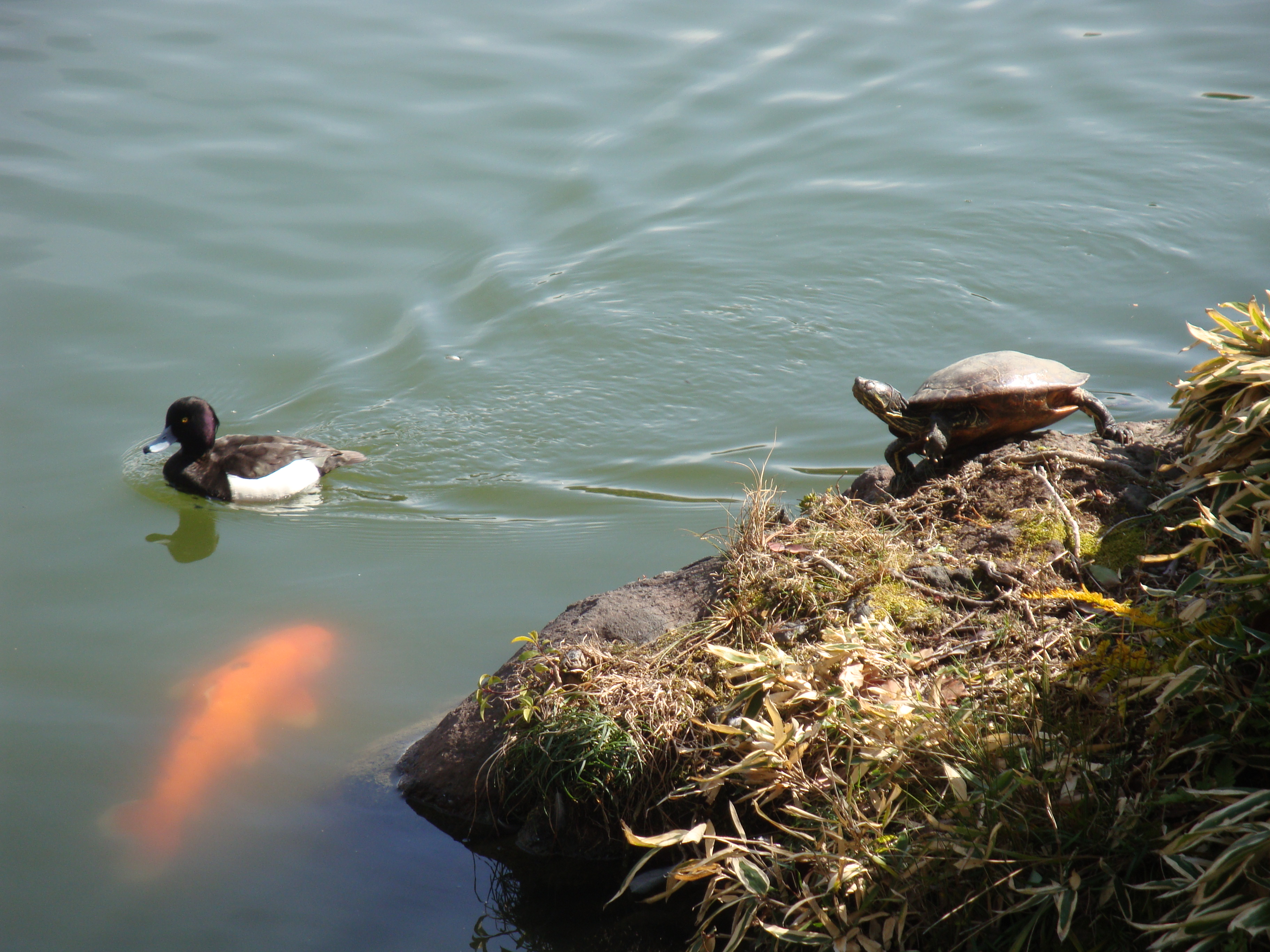
A carp, a duck and a turtle

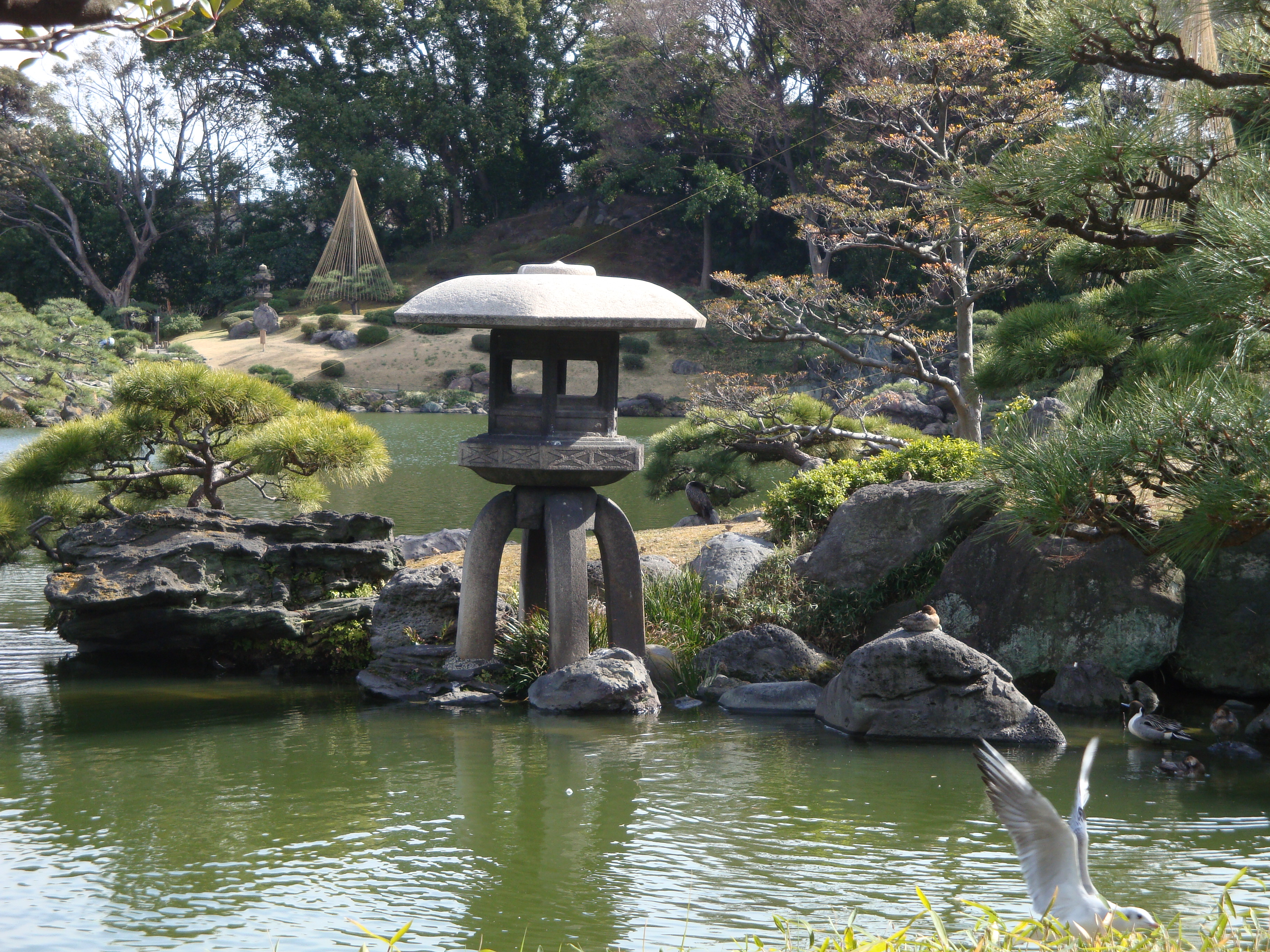
A stone lantern

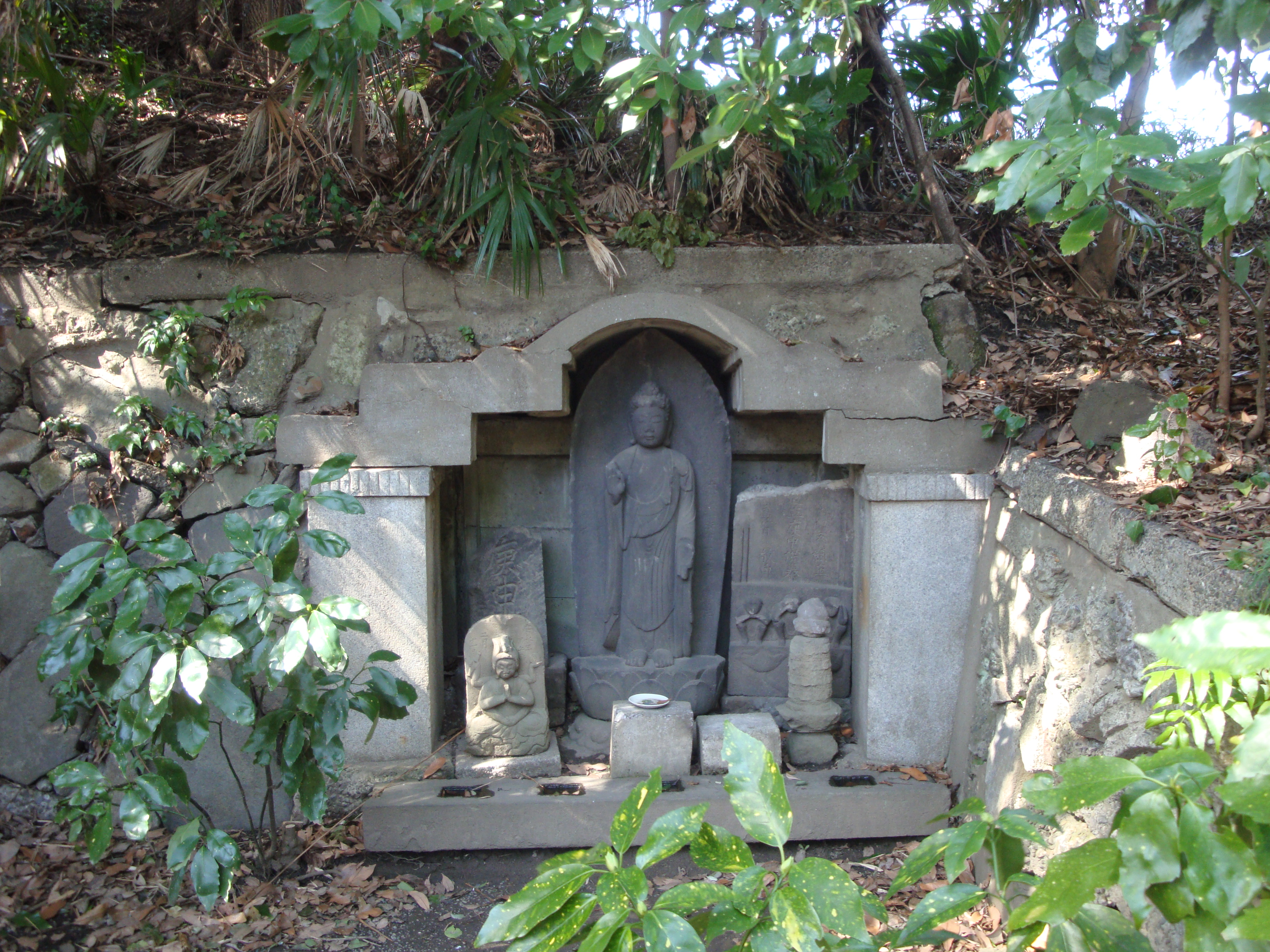
Sekibutsugun

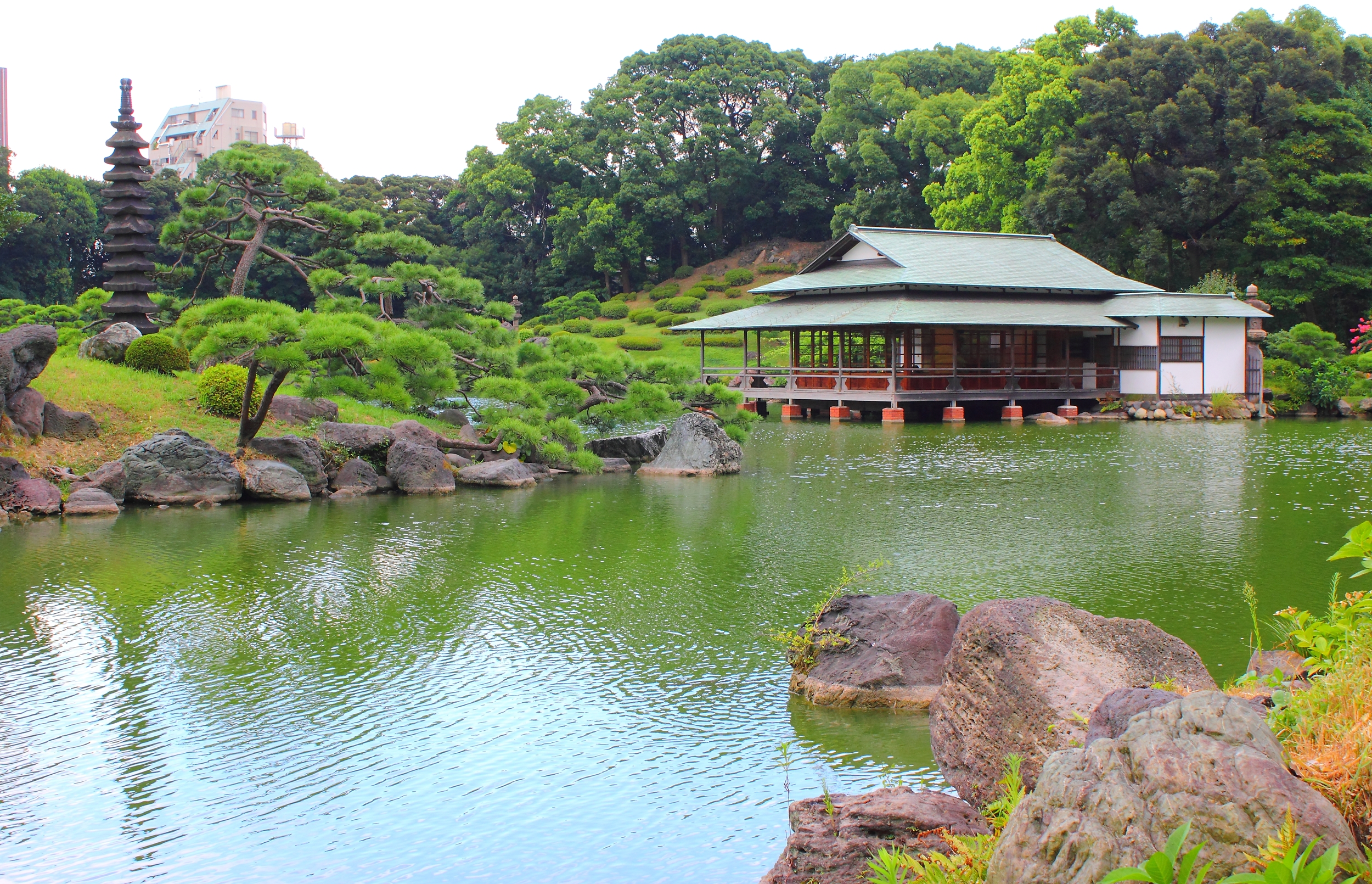
Tea house

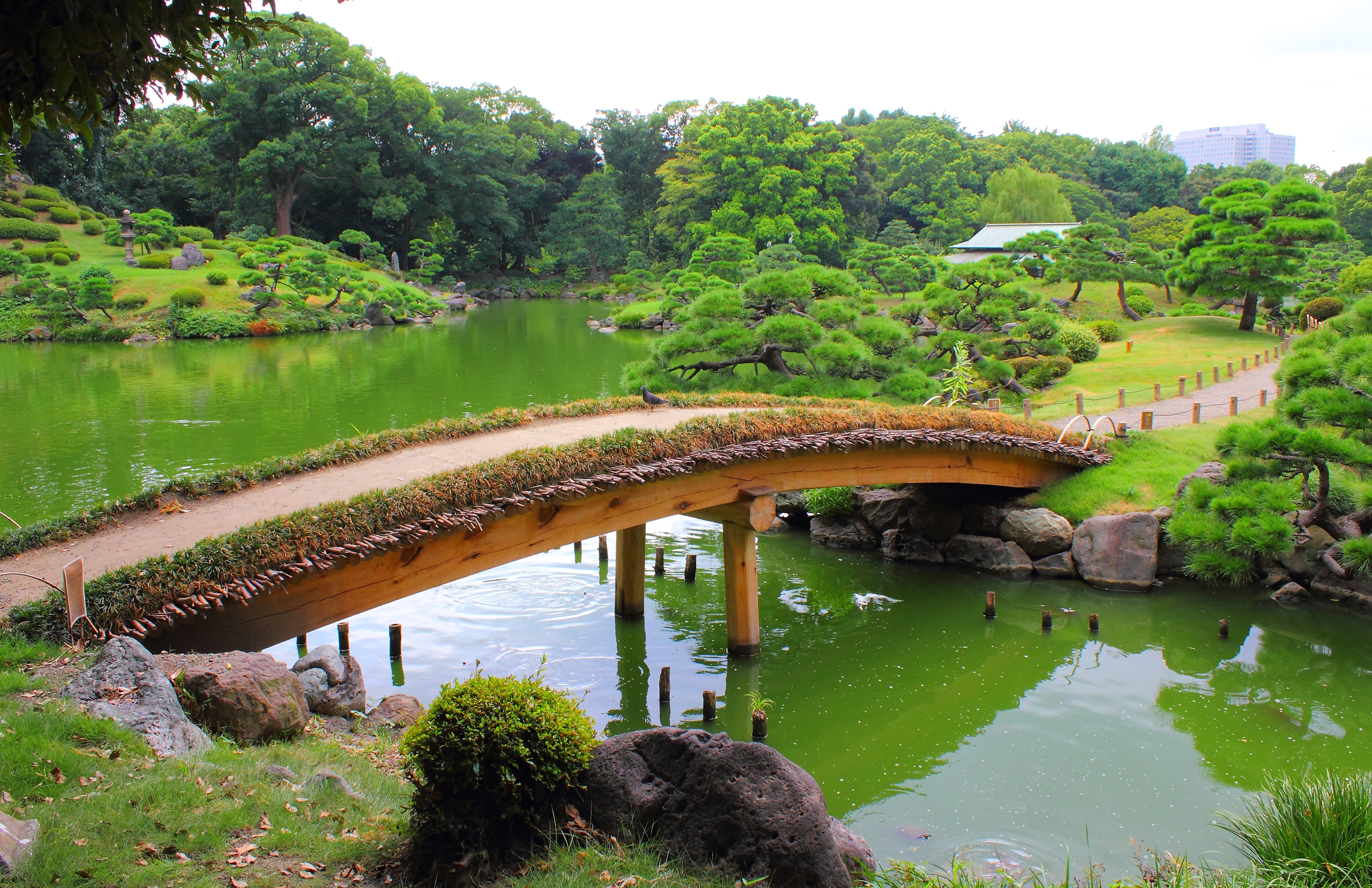

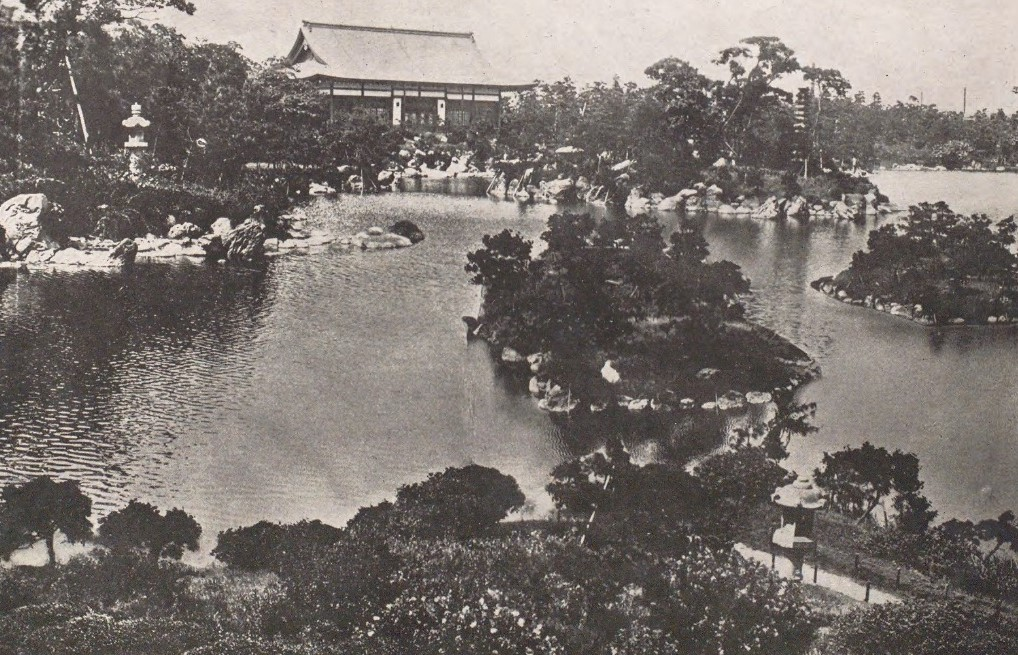
1930

== See also ==
- Kyu-Iwasaki-tei Garden
