= Maryam Saeedifard =

Electrical engineer

Maryam Saeedifard is an electrical engineer specializing in power electronics, including multi-level HVDC converters, and the control theory of microgrids, with application to inexpensive and efficient renewable energy power conversion for solar power and wind power. Originally from Iran, and educated in Iran and Canada, she has worked in Switzerland and the US, where she is Dean's Professor in the School of Electrical and Computer Engineering at Georgia Tech.

== Education and career ==
Saeedifard is originally from Iran. She was a student in electrical engineering at Isfahan University of Technology, where she earned a bachelor's degree in 1998 and a master's degree in 2002. She went to the University of Toronto for a Ph.D. in electrical engineering, completed in 2008.

After becoming a researcher in Switzerland for ABB, working on wind turbine energy generation, she returned to academia as an assistant professor at Purdue University in 2010. She moved to Georgia Tech in 2014, and was named Dean's Professor in 2021.

Beyond her research and teaching, she is active in mentoring women in engineering, and has chaired the Women in Engineering committee of the IEEE Power Electronics Society.

== Recognition ==
Saeedifard was the 2010 winner of the Richard M. Bass Outstanding Young Power Electronics Engineer Award of the IEEE Power Electronics Society. In 2018 she received the J. David Irwin Early Career Award of the IEEE Industrial Electronics Society, "for outstanding research contributions in modulation and control of multilevel converters and voltage-sourced converter-based dc (HVDC) transmission".

She was the 2021 winner of the C3E Technology Research & Innovation Award of the Clean Energy Education and Empowerment Initiative, sponsored by the United States Department of Energy. She was one of the recipients of the 2022 Nagamori Awards, recognizing her "for contributions to highly-efficient, power-dense and fault-tolerant multilevel converter-based medium-voltage drives".

She was elected as an IEEE Fellow in 2022, "for contributions to modulation, control and protection of multilevel converters for high-voltage DC transmission".
