= Former Tanaka Family Residence =

Japanese western-style building in Suehiro, Kawaguchi, Saitama Prefecture

Coordinates: 35.804528°N 139.733167°E

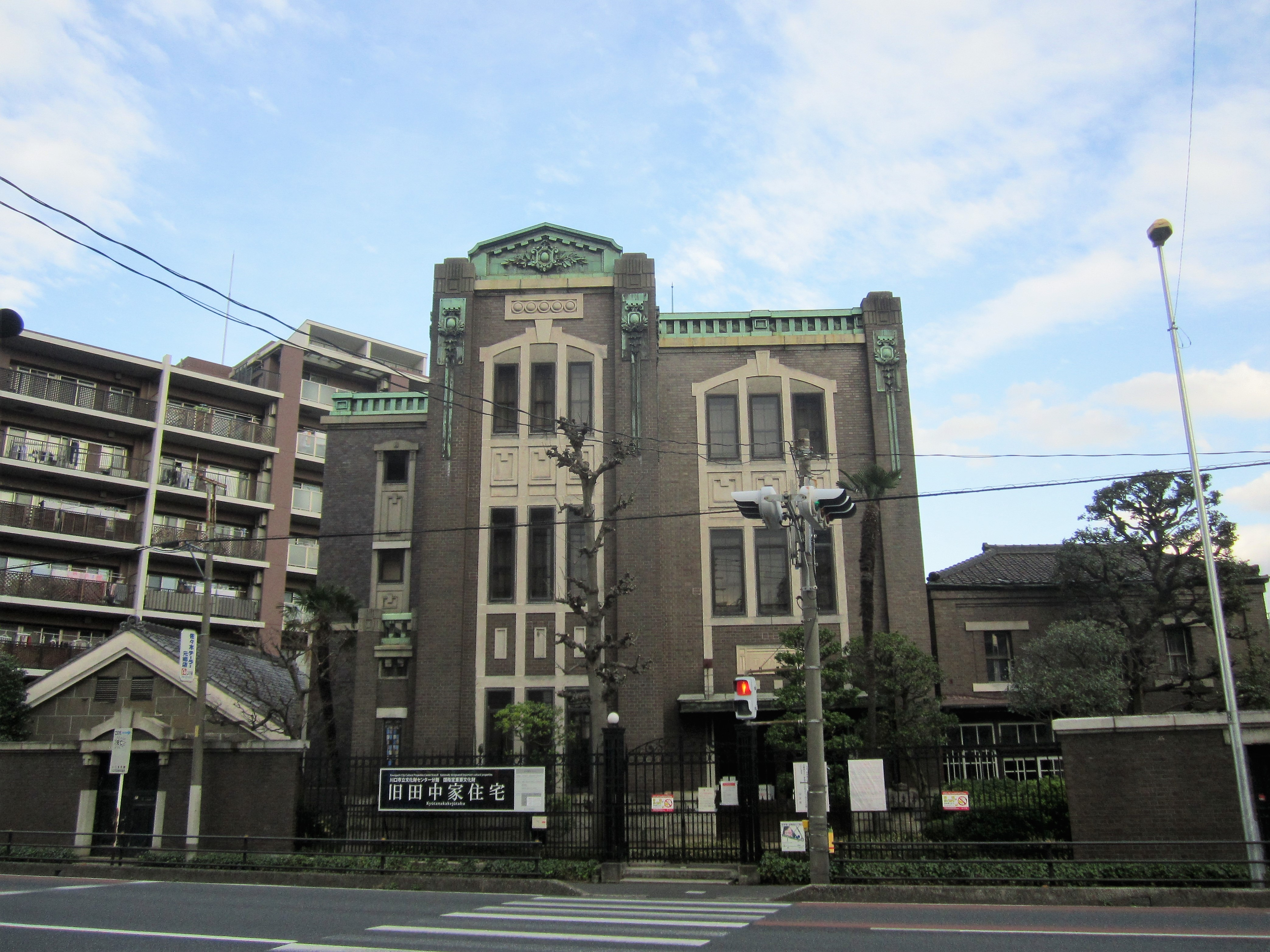
The Former Tanaka Family Residence

The Former Tanaka Family Residence (旧田中家住宅) is a Japanese western-style building located in Suehiro, Kawaguchi, Saitama Prefecture.

The building was constructed in 1923 for Tokubei Tanaka, a miso industrialist who later became a politician. The residence is not to be confused with the one located in the Kyōdo-no-Mori museum in Fuchū, Tokyo, which was relocated there.

== Architecture ==
The building's exterior is constructed of brick. Inside, it features both Japanese-style rooms and Western-style rooms. Unusual for its time, the building has three stories. It serves as an example of early Western influence on Japanese architecture. For instance, the wooden staircase is in the Western style. The fusuma sliding door on the outside is Western, but the room it leads to is Japanese, and thus the interior of the sliding door is in traditional Japanese style as well.

== See also ==
- Kyu-Iwasaki-tei Garden
- Ogasawara-Hakushaku-Tei
