= Ogasawara-Hakushaku-Tei =

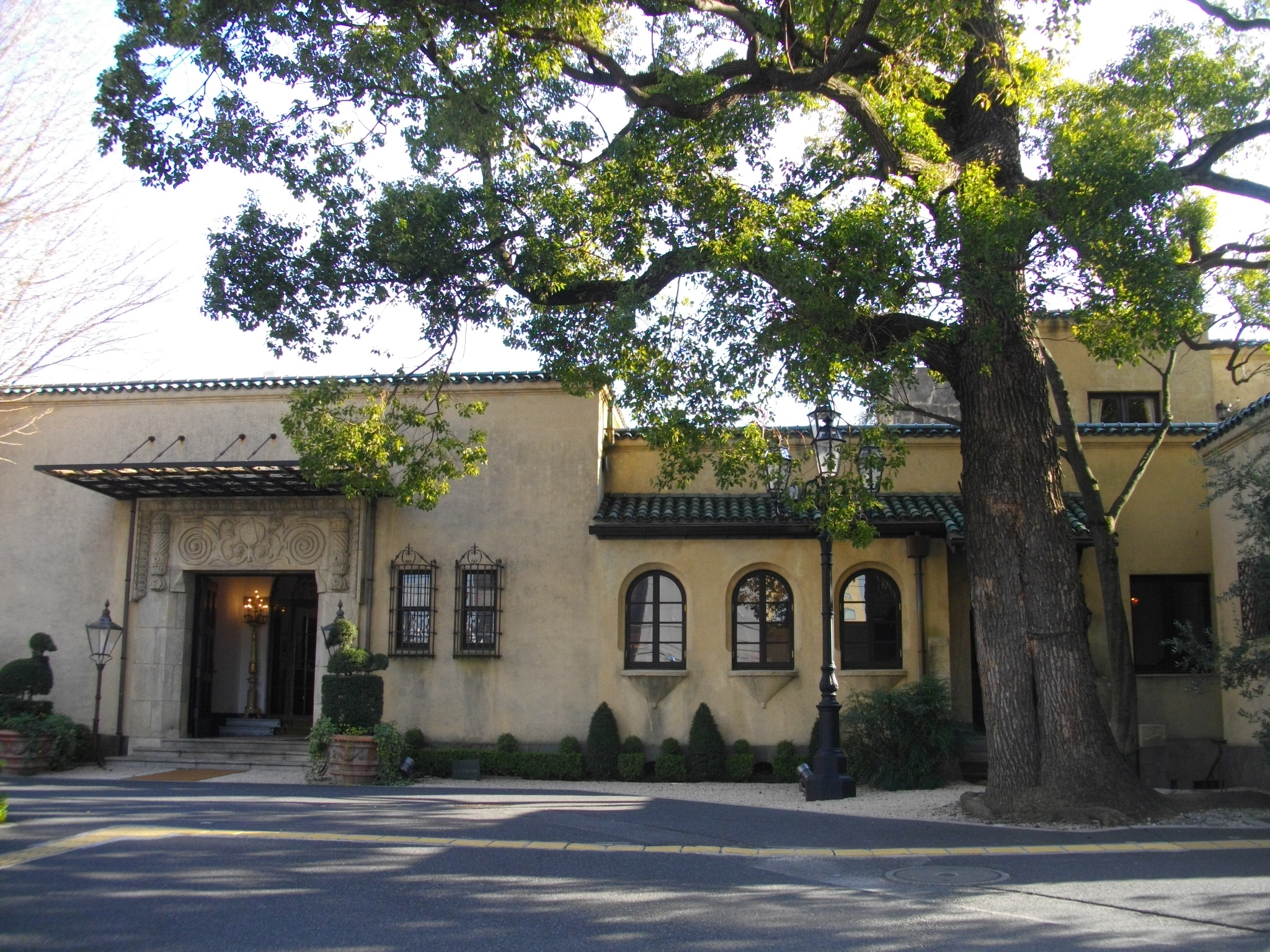
Former residence of Count Ogasawara

The Ogasawara-Hakushaku-Tei (小笠原伯爵邸) is the former residence of Count Ogasawara Nagayoshi (1885–1935), located in Shinjuku, Tokyo. It was built in 1927 in the Spanish Colonial Revival architecture style, and has a cigar room done in the Moorish Revival architecture style.

== See also ==
- Kyu-Iwasaki-tei Garden
- Former Tanaka Family Residence
