= Annette Muetze =

Annette Muetze is an electrical engineer from the Graz University of Technology in Graz, Austria. She was named a Fellow of the Institute of Electrical and Electronics Engineers (IEEE) in 2016 "for her contributions to the analysis and mitigation of bearing currents in variable-speed drives". She was one of the recipients of the 2020 Nagamori Awards, recognizing her for "increasing the reliability, efficiency, and utilization of variable speed drive systems".
