= Leila Parsa =

Electrical engineer

Leila Parsa is an electrical engineer from Iran whose research concerns power electronics, electric motors, and their applications in electric vehicles, electric aircraft, electric boats, and the generation of renewable energy. She is a professor of electrical and computer engineering at the Baskin School of Engineering at UC Santa Cruz.

== Education and career ==
Parsa is originally from Iran, born in Tehran. She was a student at Iran University of Science and Technology, where she earned a bachelor's degree in 1996 and a master's degree in 1999.

After a year in Germany at RWTH Aachen University, she moved to the US, and completed a Ph.D. in electrical engineering at Texas A&M University in 2005. On completing her Ph.D., she joined the Department of Electrical, Computer, and Systems Engineering at Rensselaer Polytechnic Institute. She remained there until 2016, and joined the University of California, Santa Cruz in 2017.

She is a past chair of the Electrical Machines Technical Committee of the IEEE Industrial Electronics Society.

== Recognition ==
Parsa received the IEEE Industry Applications Society Outstanding Young Member Award in 2007, and the Office of Naval Research Young Investigator Award in 2009. She was a 2021 recipient of the Nagamori Awards, given for her work on "multi-phase permanent magnet motors, design, analysis, and control". She was named an IEEE Fellow, in the 2021 class of fellows, "for contributions to control of multi-phase permanent magnet motor drives".
