= Kyoto University of Advanced Science =

Coordinates: 35.010333°N 135.718556°E

- 京都先端科学大学
- Other names: KUAS
- Former names: Kyoto Gakuen University (1969–2019)
- Type: Private
- Established: 1925
- Chairman: Shigenobu Nagamori
- President: Masafumi Maeda
- Students: 3,633
- Location: Kyoto, Japan
- Language: Japanese, English
- Website: https://www.kuas.ac.jp/en/

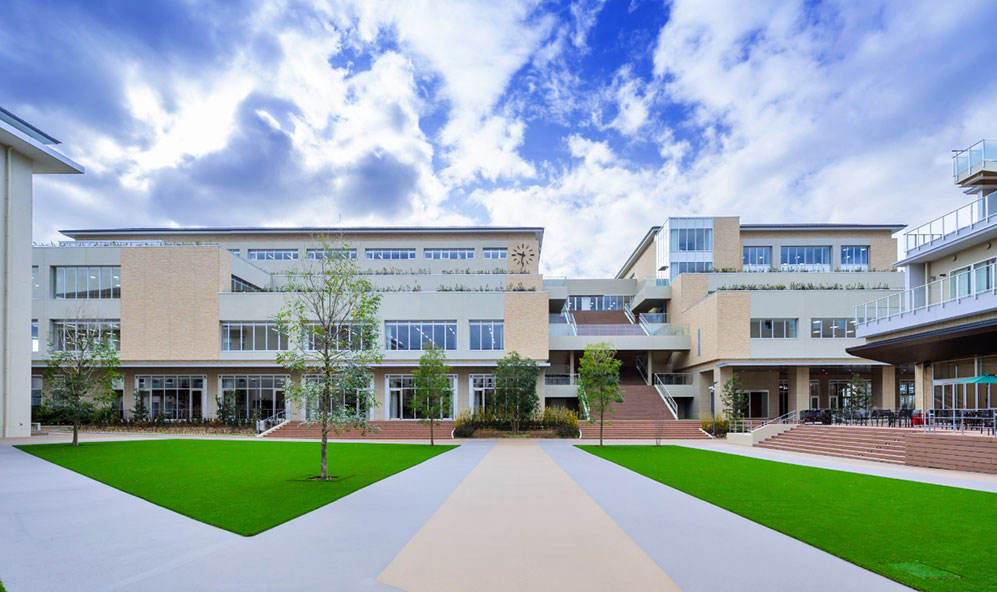
Kyoto University of Advanced Science Uzumasa campus

Kyoto University of Advanced Science (京都先端科学大学, Kyōto sentan kagaku daigaku; KUAS), formerly Kyoto Gakuen University, is a private university located in Ukyō-ku, Kyoto, Japan. Originally founded as a trade school in 1925 and established as university in 1969, KUAS was refounded in 2019 under the leadership of Shigenobu Nagamori. Its two campuses are located in Ukyō-ku, Kyoto City, and Kameoka City, Kyoto Prefecture.

The university is organized into five faculties and five graduate schools. The undergraduate faculties include the Faculty of Economics and Business Administration, the Faculty of Humanities, the Faculty of Bioenvironmental Science, the Faculty of Health and Medical Sciences, and the Faculty of Engineering. The graduate schools include the Graduate School of Economics, the Graduate School of Business Administration, the Graduate School of Human Culture, the Graduate School of Bioenvironmental Science, and the Graduate School of Engineering.

In 2020, the university's Faculty of Engineering began to offer programs taught entirely in English.
