= Food model =

Replicas of food items used in restaurant street displays in Japan and Korea

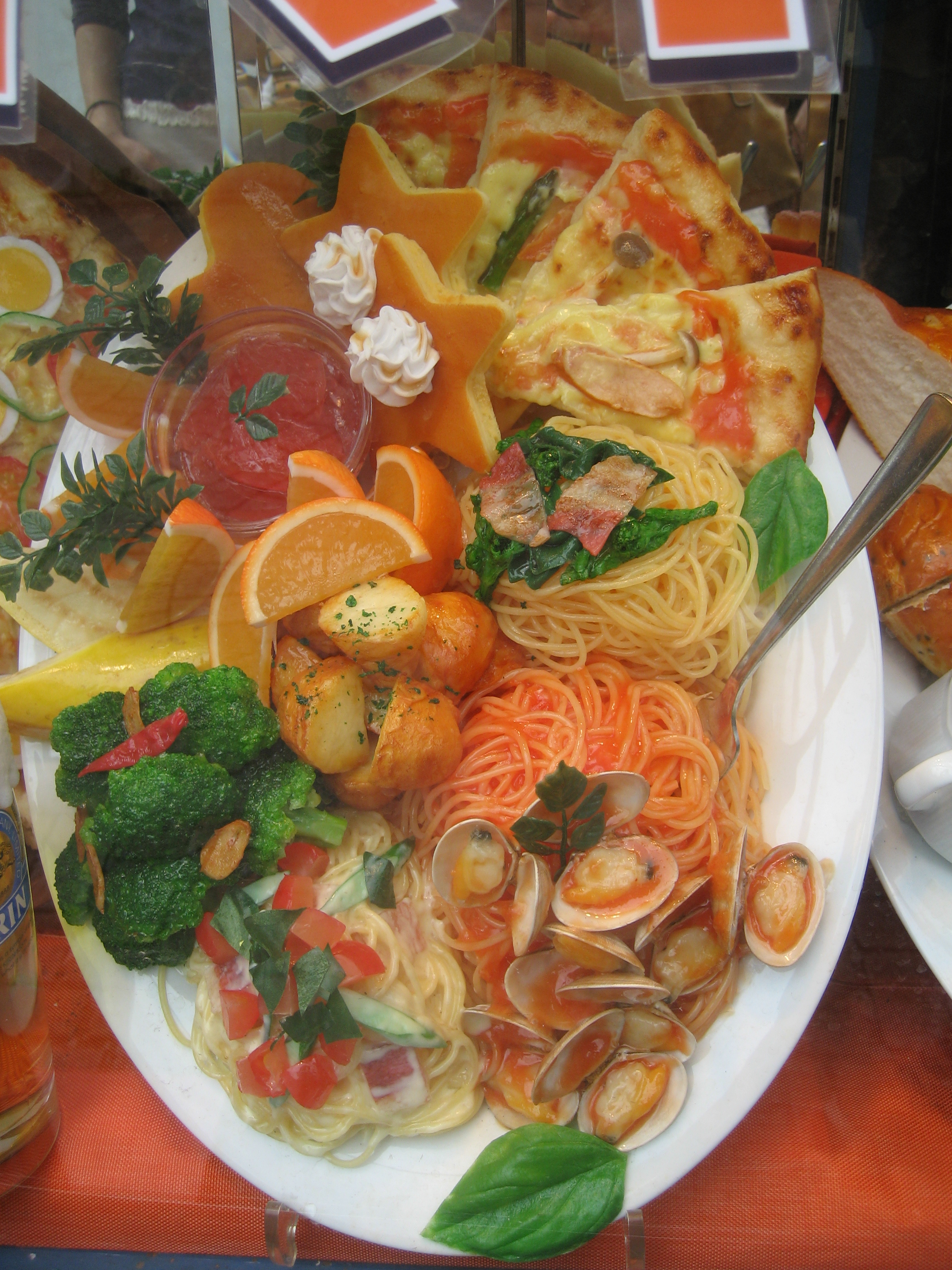
Model foods in a restaurant window in Japan

Food models, also known as fake foods, food figurines or "food samples" (Japanese: 食品サンプル, romanized: shokuhin sampuru), are scale models or replicas of a food item or dish made from plastic, wax, resin, or a similar inedible material. They are commonly used as mockups in restaurant display windows and shelves in Japan, although other countries like South Korea and China also use such models for similar purposes in restaurants, food booths, and food carts.

Using food models allows food vendors to advertise to consumers a three-dimensional image of their products, while avoiding the need to put real food on display unattended for prolonged periods of time, which may become contaminated or spoiled or attract insects.

== Use by Japanese restaurants ==
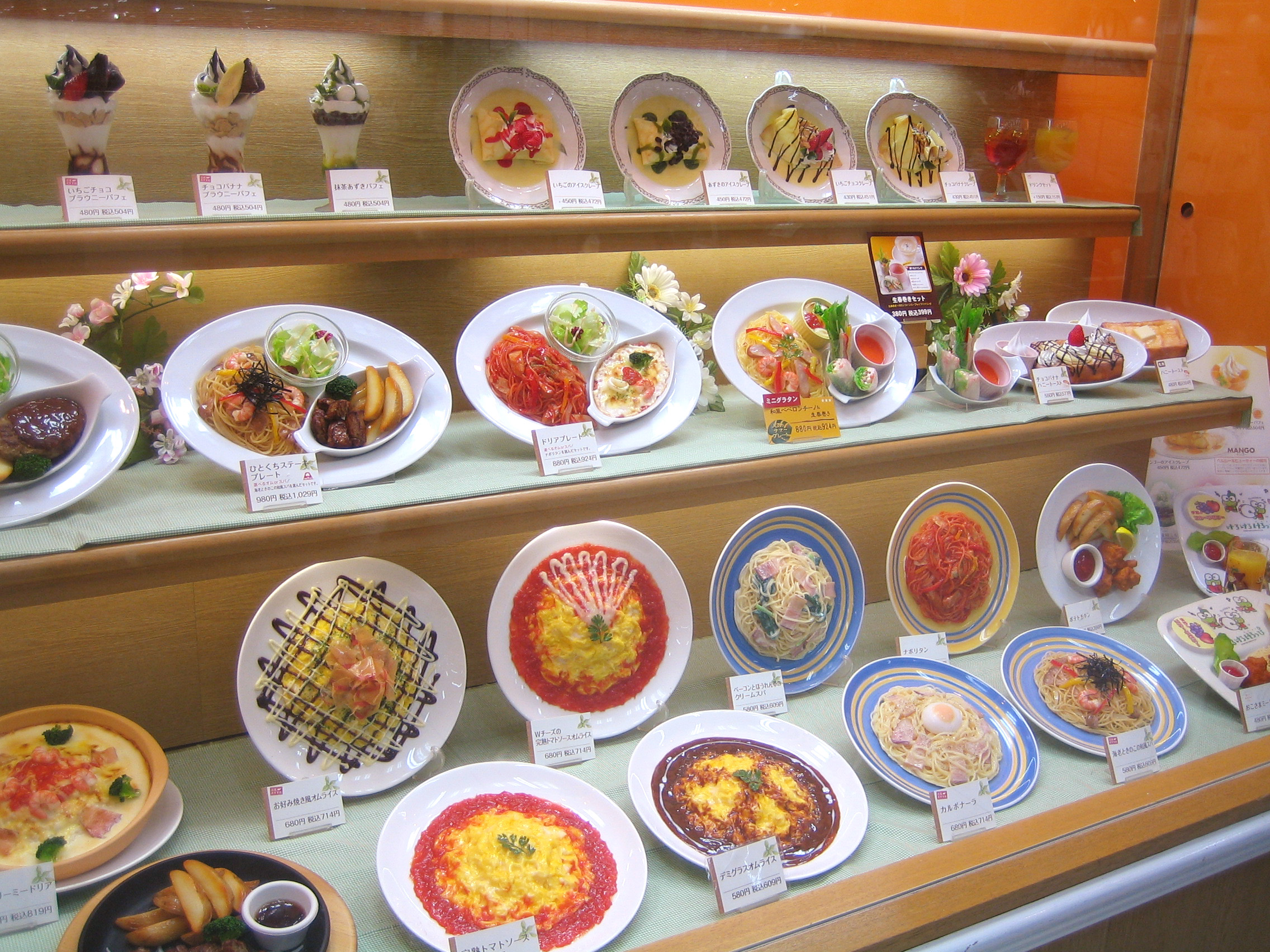
Model food dishes in a restaurant in Japan

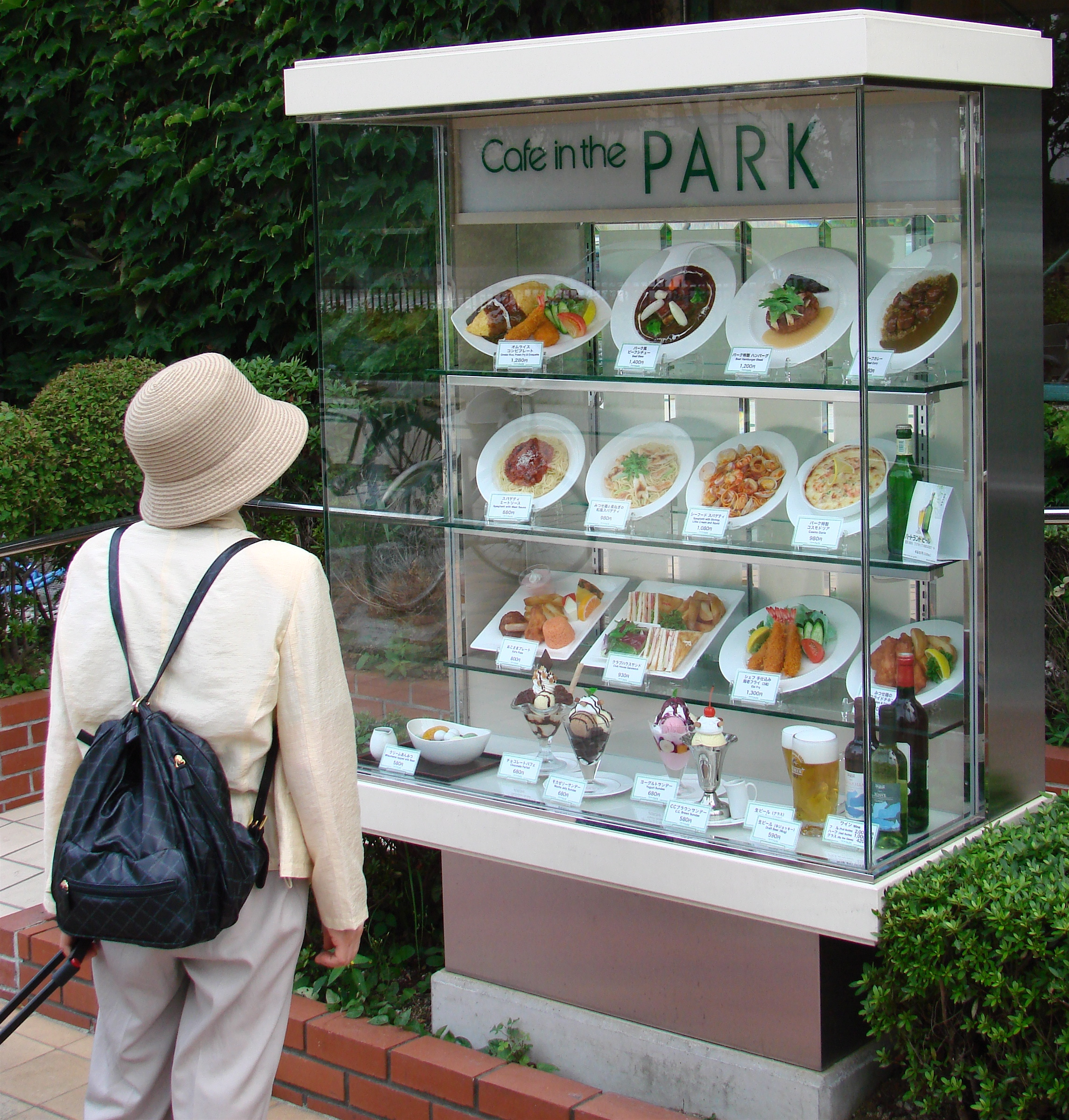
Person looking at a model menu

Old food models in front of a Sushi shop in Tokyo

In Japan, shokuhin sampuru (食品サンプル), taken from the English "sample", are widespread. In the late Edo period, in the 1800s, food sellers displayed a plate of real food each day in lieu of a written menu. During the early Shōwa period, in the late 1920s, Japanese artisans and candle makers developed food models that made it easy for patrons to order without the use of menus, which were not common in Japan at that time. Paraffin was used to create these until the mid-1980s, but because its colors faded when exposed to heat or sunlight, manufacturers later switched to polyvinyl chloride, which is "nearly eternal".

The plastic models are mostly handmade from polyvinyl chloride and sculpted to look like the actual dishes. The models can be custom-tailored to individual restaurants and even common items such as ramen can be modified to match each establishment's food or regional differences. During the molding process, the imitation ingredients are often chopped up and combined in a manner similar to actual cooking.

Many restaurants in Japan use replicas to display their popular dishes in their windows and attract customers. The plastic food manufacturers fiercely guard their trade secrets as business is lucrative; the plastic food industry in Japan, by conservative estimates, has revenues of billions of yen per year. A single restaurant may order a complete menu of plastic items costing over a million yen (equivalent to about 7,900 Euros or US$9,600). The plastic replicas are much more expensive than the food they imitate, but can last indefinitely. For this reason, many companies that manufacture fake food have stagnant or declining profits. Because some individual pieces can be very expensive, sometimes restaurants rent the pieces instead of buying them outright. They are also sold to the general public in some retail stores in Tokyo's "Kitchen Town" restaurant supply district.

The craftsmanship has been raised to an art form. Japanese plastic food models by the Maizuru Company were exhibited at London's Victoria and Albert Museum in 1980. In 2025, another exhibition featuring shokuhin sampuru in London at the Japan House was visited by over 200,000 people.

Regular competitions are held in making fake food dishes out of plastic and other materials.

== Other uses ==
A fake apple (right), used as a household decoration, compared to a real apple (left)

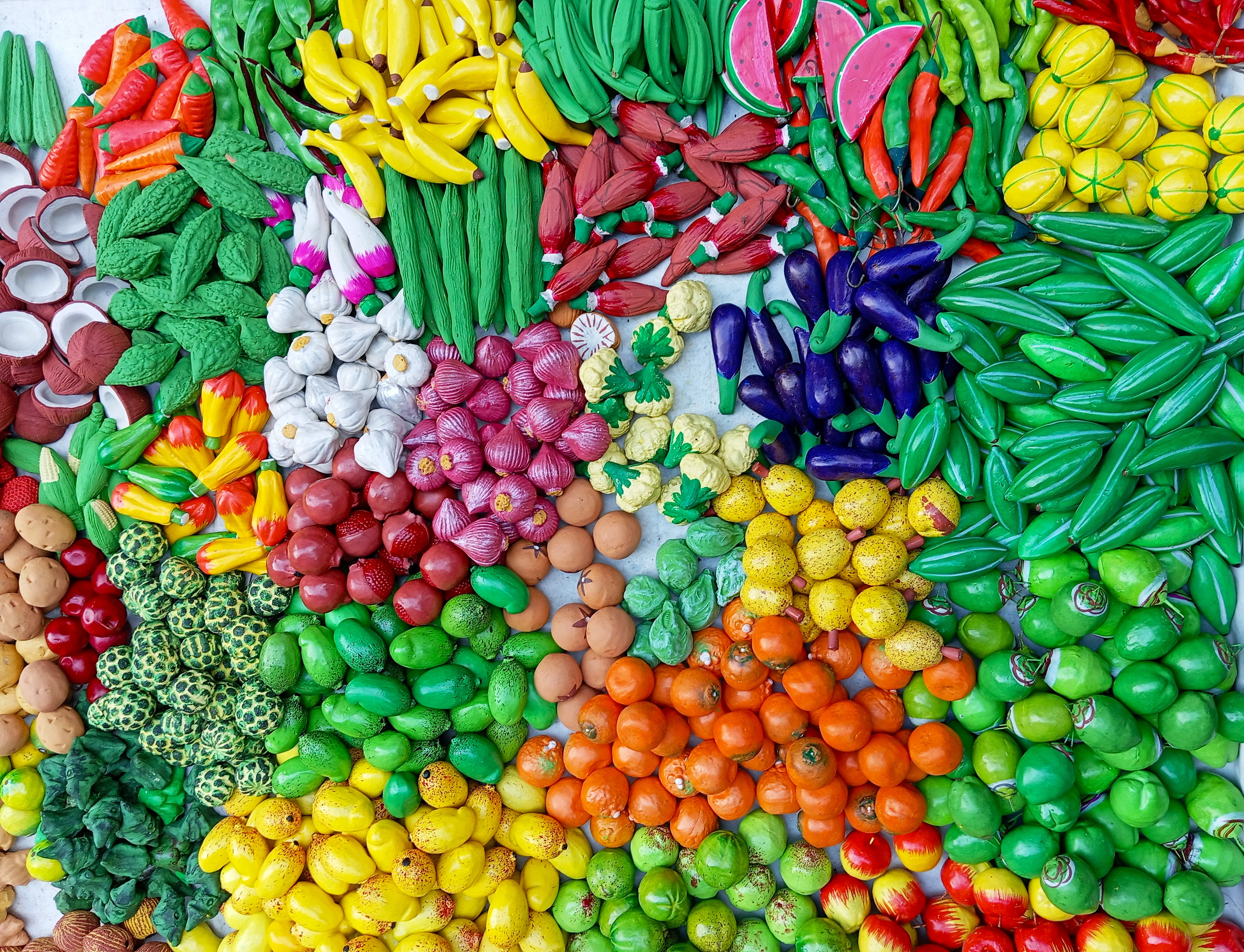
Clay models of fruits and vegetables

Fake and replica foods are used in many ways, such as props for backgrounds in movies, television shows, theatrical plays, television commercials, print ads, and trade shows. Food models are also used to display lifelike replicas of real foods for restaurants, grocery chains, museums, banquet halls, casino buffets, cruise ships, and in many other instances in which real foods cannot be displayed. For instance, the American company Fake Foods began when fast food restaurants Wendy's needed artificial kale for their salad bar display.

In the 2010s, models of foods and dishes were also used for nutrition education and consumer research.

In North America, fake food is often used for retail displays. Furniture retailers use it in showrooms (such as a bowl of fake apples) to give their furniture settings a lived-in look.

Sometimes at weddings, the bride and groom opt to have an elaborately decorated dummy wedding cake for show while everyone is served slices of sheet cake.

== Manufacturing process ==
Battering model tempura

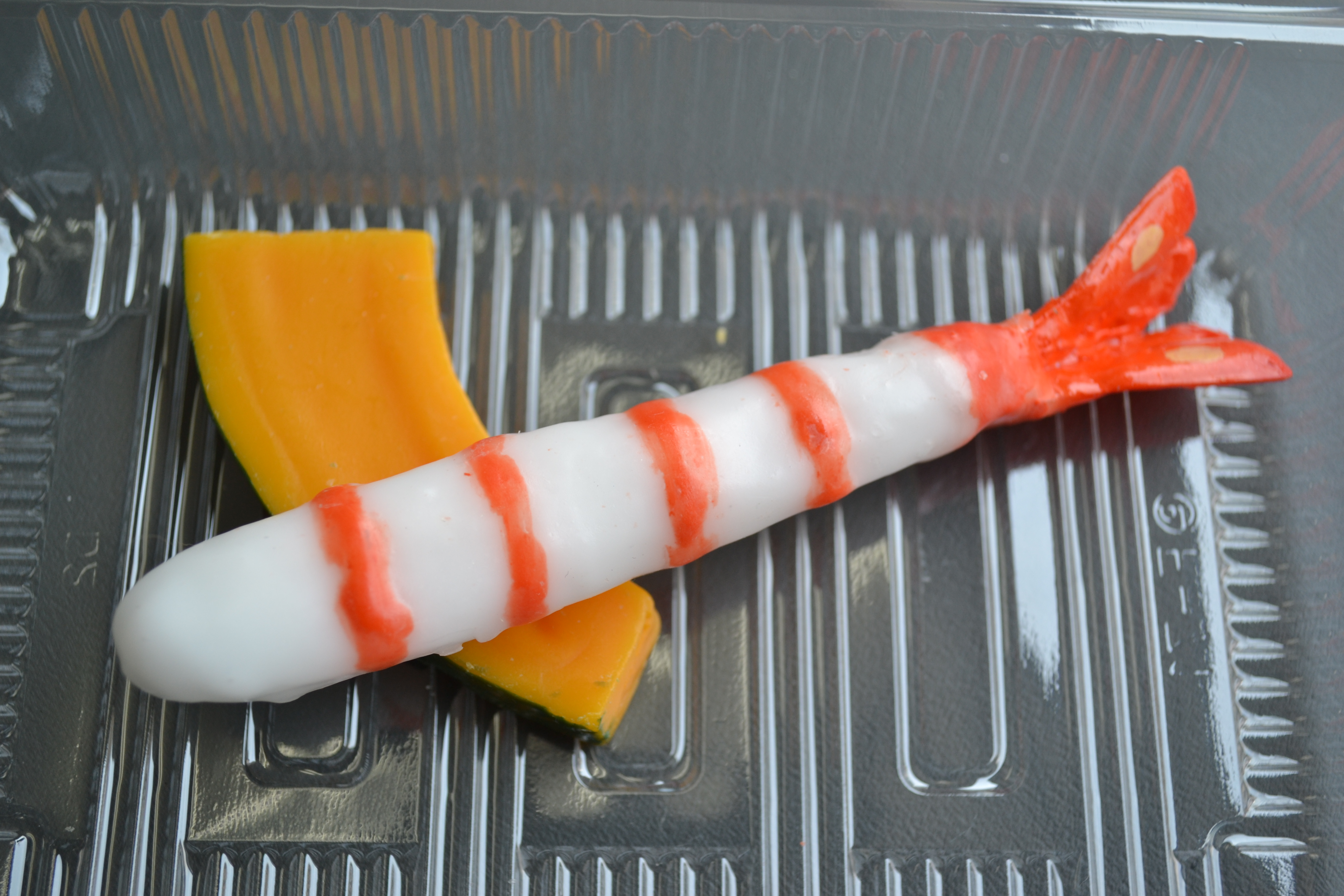
Wax items to be breaded

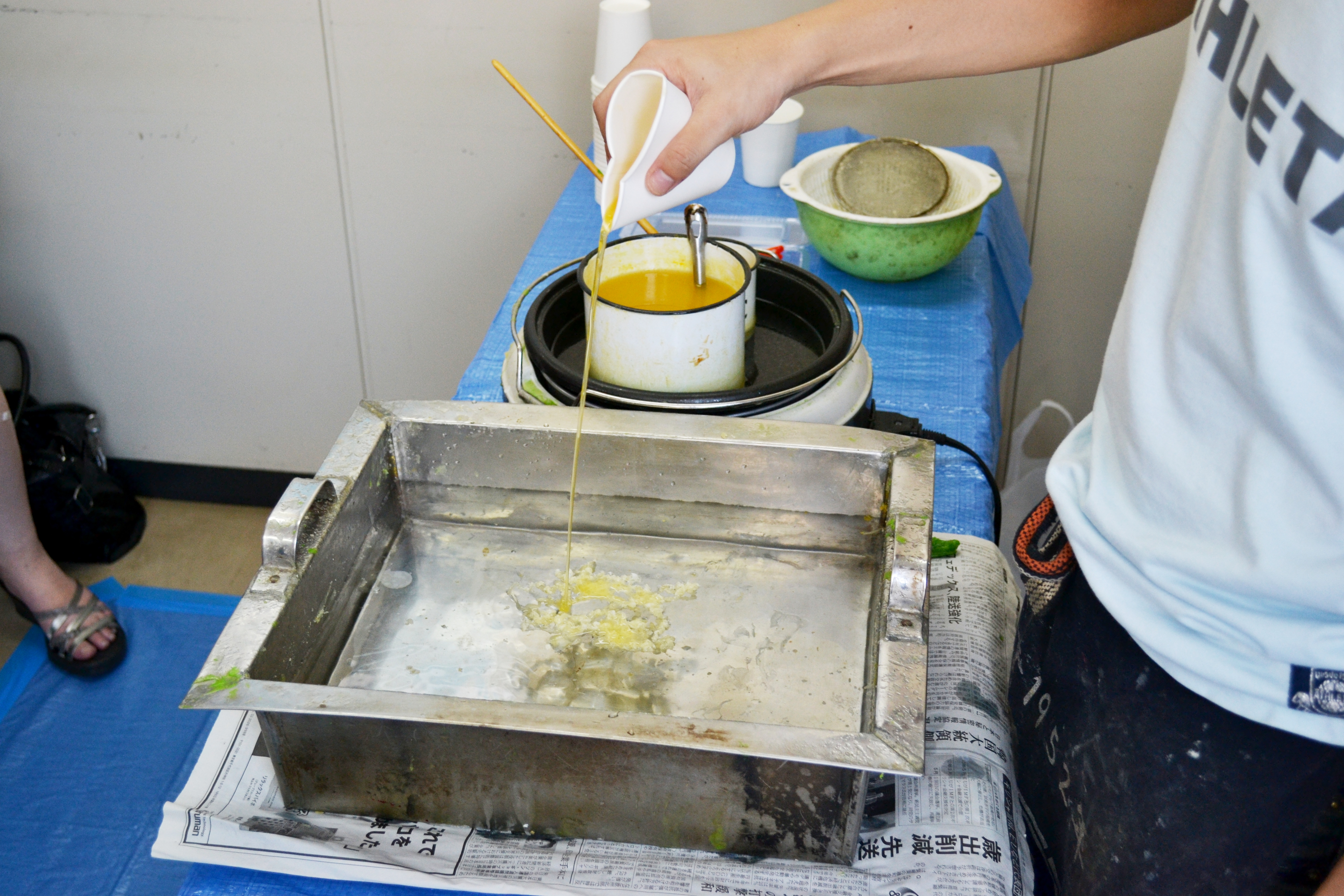
Pouring artificial batter into water

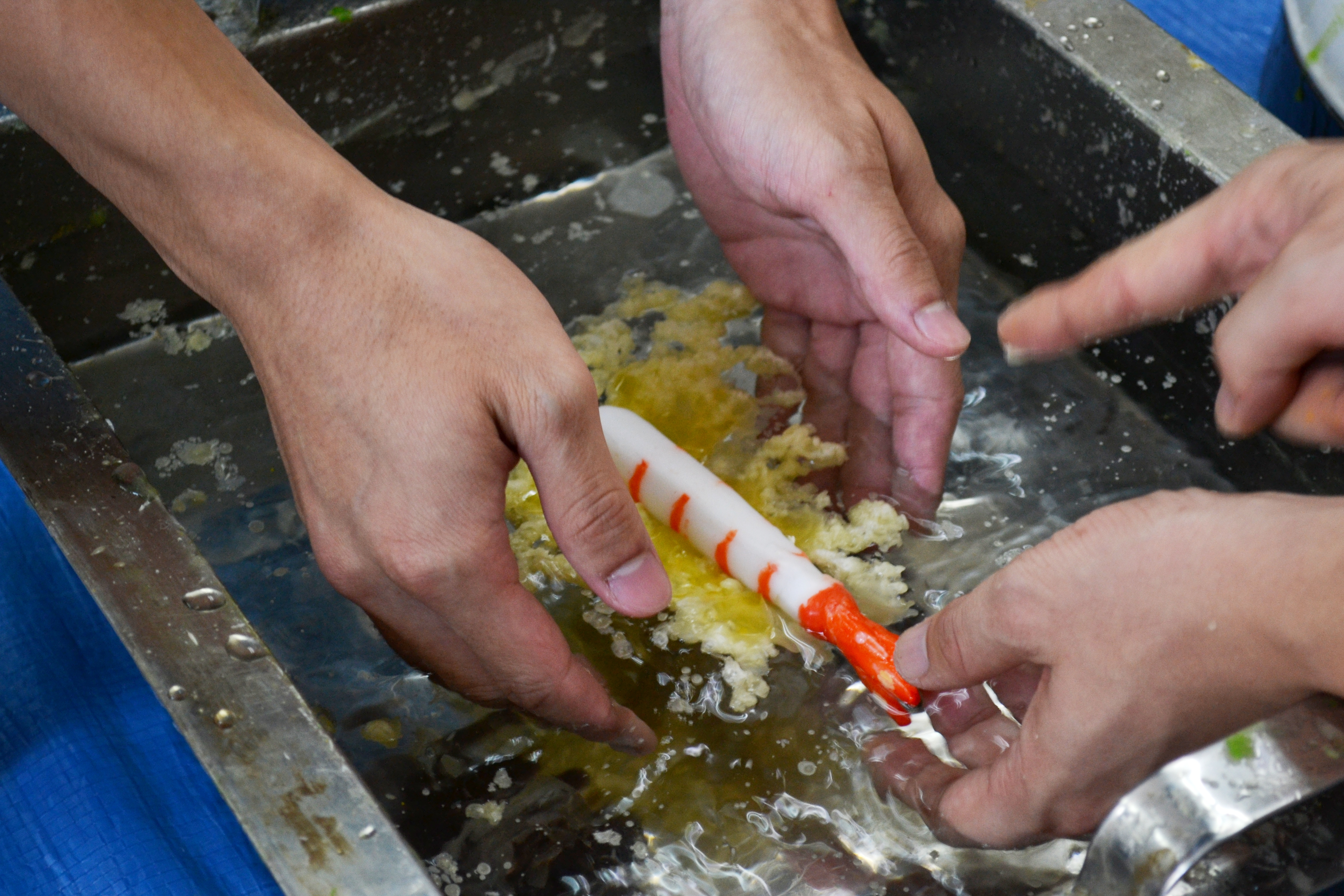
Attaching shrimp model to batter

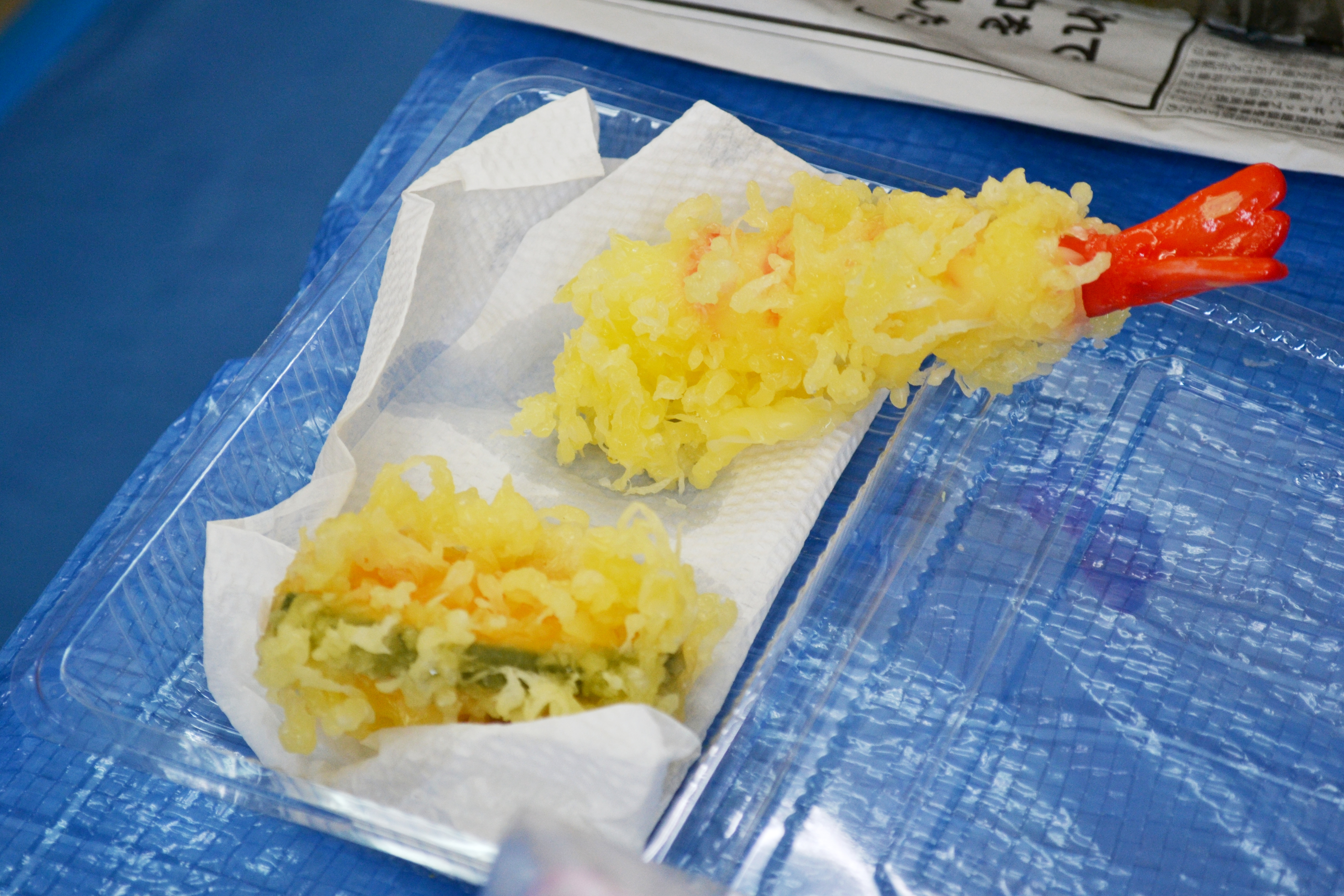
Finished pieces

Modern manufacturing technologies and plastic materials can be used to produce lifelike food replicas, although approximately 95% of fake food is still handcrafted. Artisans create these replicas using a variety of techniques, often painting them by hand to reproduce the appearance and texture of real food.

When fake food is made using a mold, the mold is created by dipping real food into silicone. A liquid plastic, typically polyvinyl chloride, is chosen in a color that matches the food, before being poured into the mold and heated in an oven until it solidifies. (When a food sample is not available or would disintegrate or melt in the mold during casting, a clay model of the food must instead be sculpted.) After setting for ten to thirty minutes, any excess vinyl buildup is trimmed off, and the replica is painted either by hand or airbrush. If the food comprises several parts, such as a hamburger or sushi roll, the item is assembled from separate vinyl pieces.

While some large-scale fake food manufacturing companies exist, others are small shops with a single proprietor. Fake food items can be found and purchased in Kappabashi-dori, the food supply street in Tokyo and also at Doguyasuji located in Namba, Osaka. Factories can be found in Gujō, Gifu. Iwasaki Be-I is the biggest plastic food manufacturer in Japan, founded by Takizo Iwasaki in 1932. Maiduru is another old and large manufacturer.
