= Ishizaki =

Ishizaki (written: 石崎 lit. "stone peninsula") is a Japanese surname. Notable people with the surname include:

- Gaku Ishizaki (石崎 岳, born 1955), Japanese politician
- Kotomi Ishizaki (石崎 琴美, born 1960), Japanese anime creator, producer and screenwriter
- Nobuhiro Ishizaki (石﨑 信弘, born 1958), Japanese footballer and manager
- Stefan Ishizaki (born 1982), Swedish footballer
- Takashi Ishizaki, Japanese mixed martial artist
- Takumi Ishizaki (石崎 巧, born 1984), Japanese basketball player
- Tsuyoshi Ishizaki (石崎 剛, born 1990), Japanese baseball player

== See also ==
- 8163 Ishizaki, a main-belt asteroid
- Iwasaki
