= Kaori Iwasaki =

Japanese swimmer

Personal information
- Born: 9 February 1969 (age 57)

Sport
- Sport: Swimming
- Strokes: breaststroke

Kaori Iwasaki (岩崎 香, Iwasaki Kaori; born 9 February 1969) is a Japanese breaststroke swimmer. She competed in two events at the 1984 Summer Olympics.
