= Takizo Iwasaki =

Japanese businessman (1895–1965)

Iwasaki Takizo (岩崎 瀧三, Iwasaki Takizō) (September 12, 1895 - 1965) was a Japanese businessman who is credited with the invention of "shokuhin sampuru", the plastic models of menu items commonly displayed in restaurant street-front windows in Japan.

== Life ==
Iwasaki was born in Gujo Hachiman Japan on September 12, 1895. He is said to have been inspired to create his first shokuhin sampuru after seeing drops of candle wax forming on the tatami mat floor of his apartment. After many months of trial and error, Iwasaki was able to produce a fake omelette, complete with simulated tomato sauce, that his wife thought was real on first glance. In 1932, his fake omelette was used in a display at a department store in Osaka.

He later opened a company called Iwasaki Be-I Co., Ltd., in Gujo Hachiman, his hometown. The company still enjoys a large share, with an estimated 60% of the Japanese market for shokuhin sampuru in 2016 growing to 70% in 2025. The town of Gujo Hachiman is now known as the food replica capital of the Japan.

Iwasaki was featured as a Google Doodle on 12 September 2016.
