= Shigenobu Nagamori =

Japanese businessperson (born 1944)

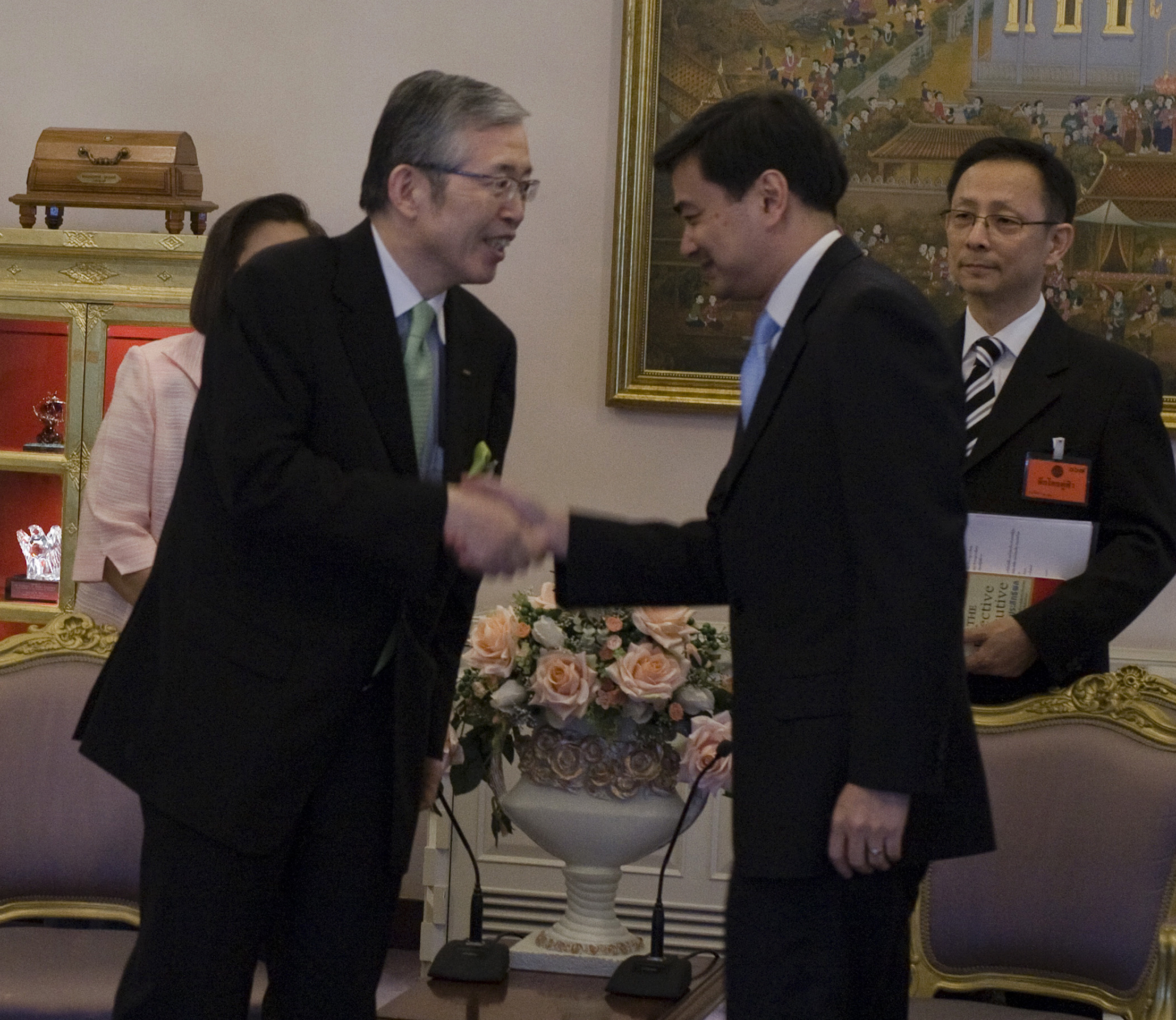
- Nagamori with Abhisit Vejjajiva in 2010
- Born: 28 August 1944 (age 81); Kyoto, Japan
- Education: Polytechnic University
- Occupations: Founder & CEO of Nidec
- Children: 2

Shigenobu Nagamori (born 1944) is a Japanese billionaire businessman, and the chairman and CEO of Nidec, the world's largest manufacturer of micromotors for hard disks and optical drives.

== Early life ==
Shigenobu Nagamori was raised in a farming family in Kyoto. He graduated with a degree in electrical engineering from the Polytechnic University near Tokyo and worked for two engineering firms before founding Nidec in 1973.

== Career ==
Nagamori owns a 12% stake in Nidec directly and via his personal asset firm, SN Kosan.

He is a non-executive director at SoftBank, the Japanese mobile communications company that owns several other tech companies.

In 2018, he announced that though he would remain as CEO, and that vice president Hiroyuki Yoshimoto would take over as president.

He has stated publicly that his goal is for Nidec to hit ¥10 trillion ($91 billion) in revenue by 2030 by focusing on the manufacture of motors for electric vehicles.

== Philanthropy ==
Nagamori founded the Nagamori Foundation to support and recognize achievements that contribute to scientific and industrial development in research and technology. The foundation encourages research in various aspects of power generation and promotes solutions that lower the barrier to affluence and conserve the environment.

In July 2014, he inaugurated the "Nagamori Awards", for up and coming R&D engineers in the field of motor-related technologies. Each year the Nagamori Awards are given to about six people with the Grand Nagamori Award winner receiving around 5 million yen and each of the awardees receiving around 2 million yen.

Nagamori award winners include Bulent Sarlioglu from the University of Wisconsin-Madison, Bin Yao, professor of mechanical engineering at Purdue University, Jose Antonino-Daviu from the Universitat Politecnica de Valencia and Elena Lomonova from Eindhoven University of Technology (TU/e).

In 2017, Nagamori announced that he would donate $90 million to set up an engineering research project at Kyoto Gakuen University. The program will start in 2020 with 200 undergraduate and 100 graduate students.

== Personal life ==
Nagamori is married, with two children, and lives in Kyoto.
