= Yunwei Ryan Li =

Electrical engineering professor

Yunwei (Ryan) Li is a Chinese Canadian engineer and academic. He is a professor, Chair of the Department of Electrical Engineering, and holds a Senior Research Chair at the University of Alberta.

Li has also been active within the IEEE Power Electronics Society (PELS). He is currently the PELS President-Elect, and has been serving as the Vice President for Products since 2023.

== Education and early career ==
In 2002, Li earned his bachelor's degree in electrical engineering from Tianjin University. In 2005, he was then a Visiting Scholar with Aalborg University, and received his Ph.D. degree from Nanyang Technological University in 2006.

After graduation and from 2006 to 2007, Li worked as a postdoctoral research fellow with the Toronto Metropolitan University. In 2007, he was employed as a research and development (R&D) engineer at Rockwell Automation Canada before joining the Faculty of Engineering at the University of Alberta later that year.

== Research ==
Li's work primarily focuses on developing key technologies to equip next-generation electrical grids to integrate renewable energy, handle more efficient loads, while improving the grid's structural efficiency and operational reliability. His work advances the technologies needed for a net-zero electricity grid, integrating renewable energy, energy storage, and electric vehicle charging infrastructure to modernize electrical grids, which ensures resilience against climate change while meeting the demands of the green economy.

He was also elected as a fellow of the Institute of Electrical and Electronics Engineers (IEEE) and a fellow of the Canadian Academy of Engineering (FCAE) in 2020 and 2024, respectively. In 2022, for his contributions to pulse-width modulation, converter topology, and industrial drives, Li was awarded the Nagamori Foundation Award. Later, in 2025, Li was awarded the APEGA Research Excellence Summit Award by the Association of Professional Engineers and Geoscientist of Alberta.
