= Makoto Iwasaki =

Japanese Electrical Engineer

Makoto Iwasaki (born January 15, 1964) from the Nagoya Institute of Technology, Nagoya, Japan was named Fellow of the Institute of Electrical and Electronics Engineers (IEEE) in 2015 for contributions to fast and precise positioning in motion controller design.
