= 1918 =

Calendar year

1918 in various calendars
- Gregorian calendar: 1918; MCMXVIII
- Ab urbe condita: 2671
- Armenian calendar: 1367; ԹՎ ՌՅԿԷ
- Assyrian calendar: 6668
- Baháʼí calendar: 74–75
- Balinese saka calendar: 1839–1840
- Bengali calendar: 1324–1325
- Berber calendar: 2868
- British Regnal year: 8 Geo. 5 – 9 Geo. 5
- Buddhist calendar: 2462
- Burmese calendar: 1280
- Byzantine calendar: 7426–7427
- Chinese calendar: 丁巳年 (Fire Snake); 4615 or 4408 — to — 戊午年 (Earth Horse); 4616 or 4409
- Coptic calendar: 1634–1635
- Discordian calendar: 3084
- Ethiopian calendar: 1910–1911
- Hebrew calendar: 5678–5679
- Hindu calendars
- Vikram Samvat: 1974–1975
- Shaka Samvat: 1839–1840
- Kali Yuga: 5018–5019
- Holocene calendar: 11918
- Igbo calendar: 918–919
- Iranian calendar: 1296–1297
- Islamic calendar: 1336–1337
- Japanese calendar: Taishō 7 (大正７年)
- Javanese calendar: 1848–1849
- Juche calendar: 7
- Julian calendar: Gregorian minus 13 days
- Korean calendar: 4251
- Minguo calendar: ROC 7 民國7年
- Nanakshahi calendar: 450
- Thai solar calendar: 2460–2461
- Tibetan calendar: མེ་མོ་སྦྲུལ་ལོ་ (female Fire-Snake); 2044 or 1663 or 891 — to — ས་ཕོ་རྟ་ལོ་ (male Earth-Horse); 2045 or 1664 or 892

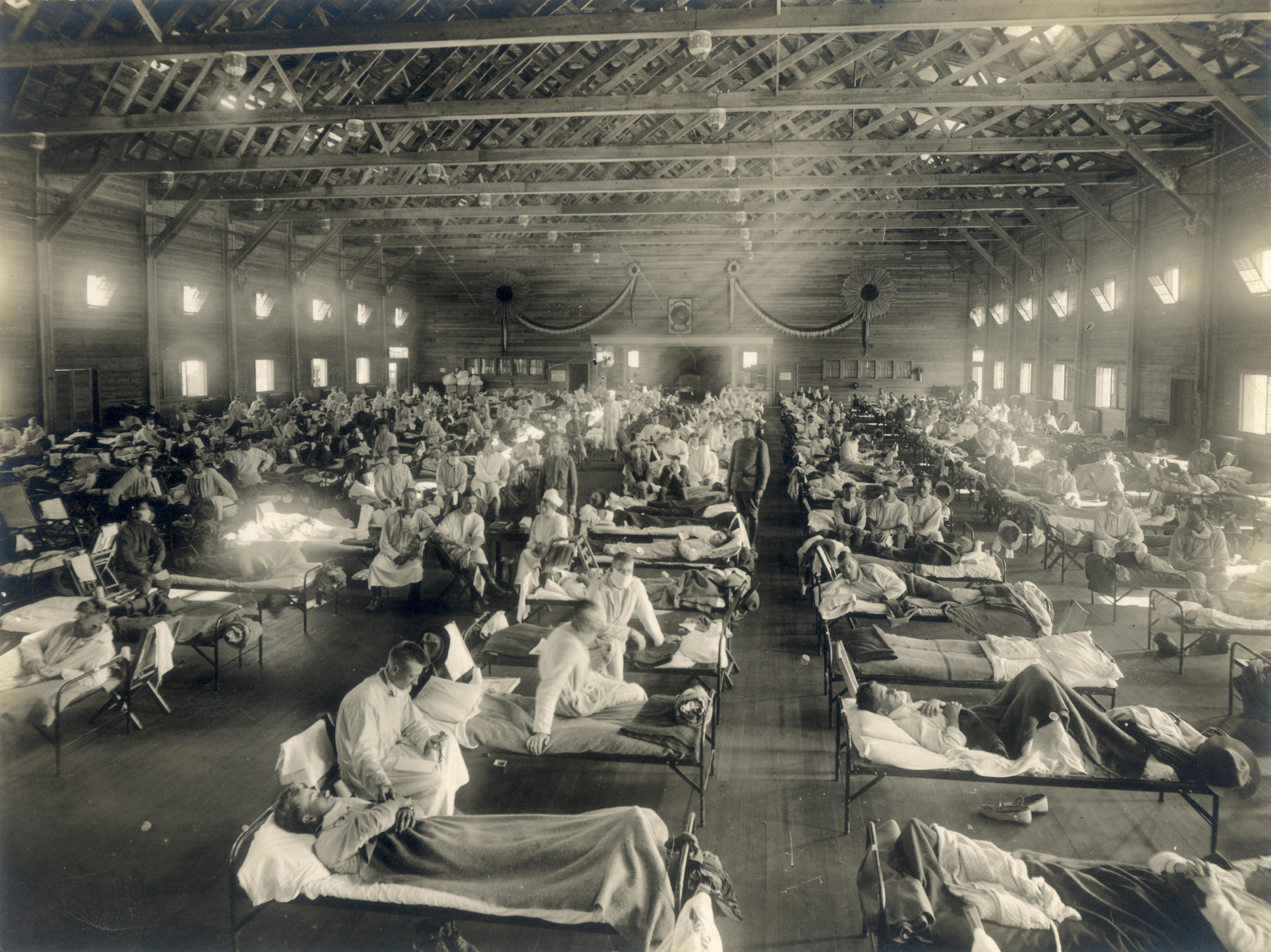
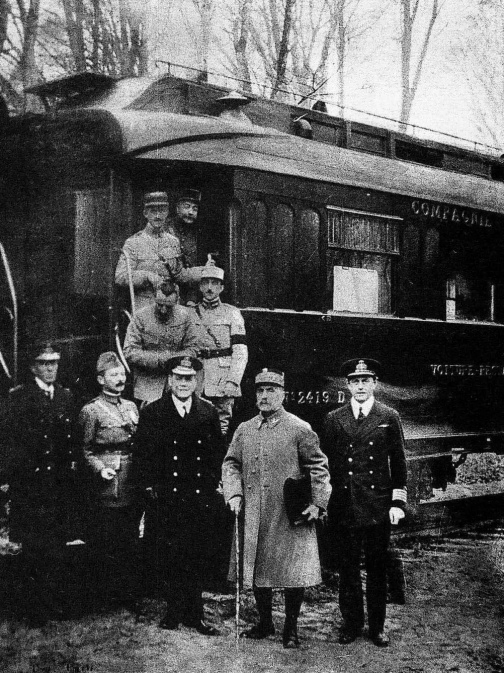
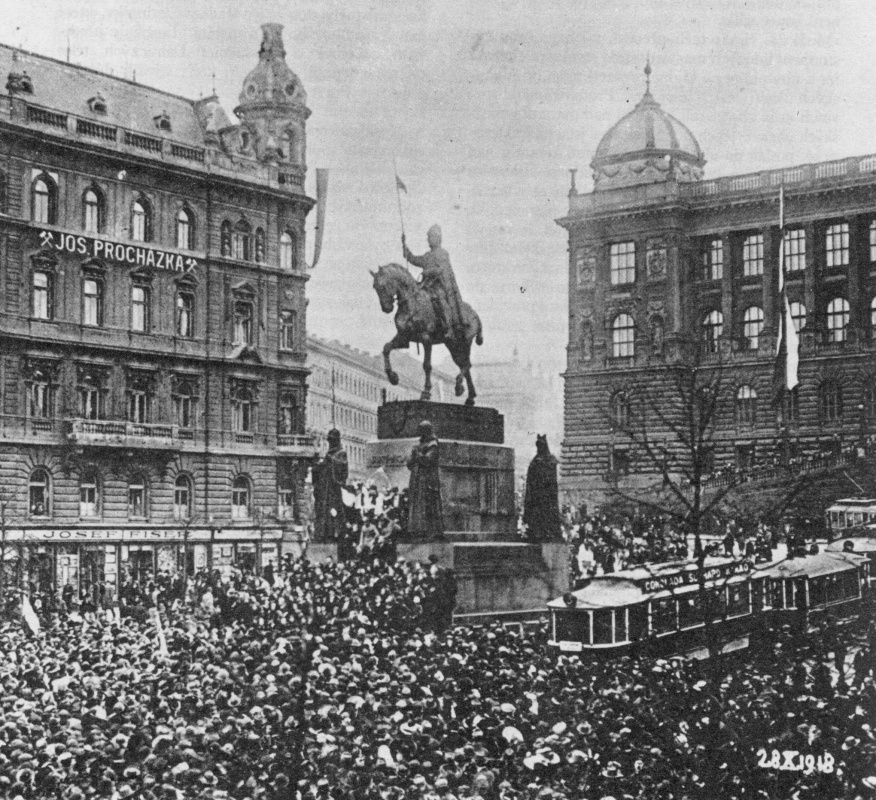
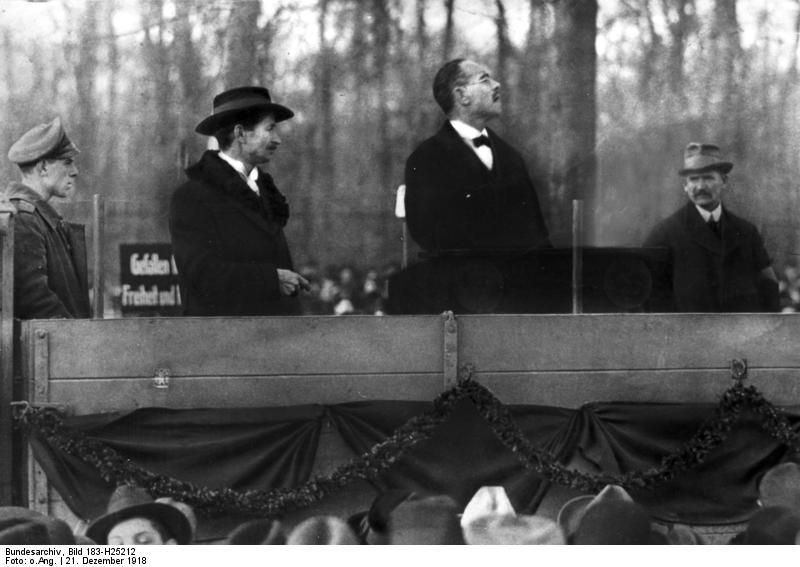
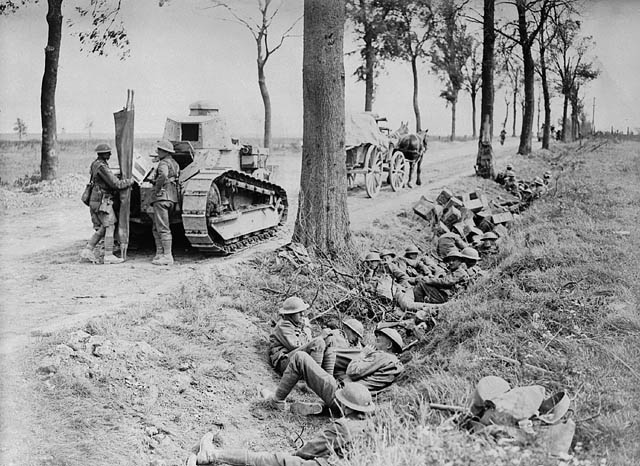
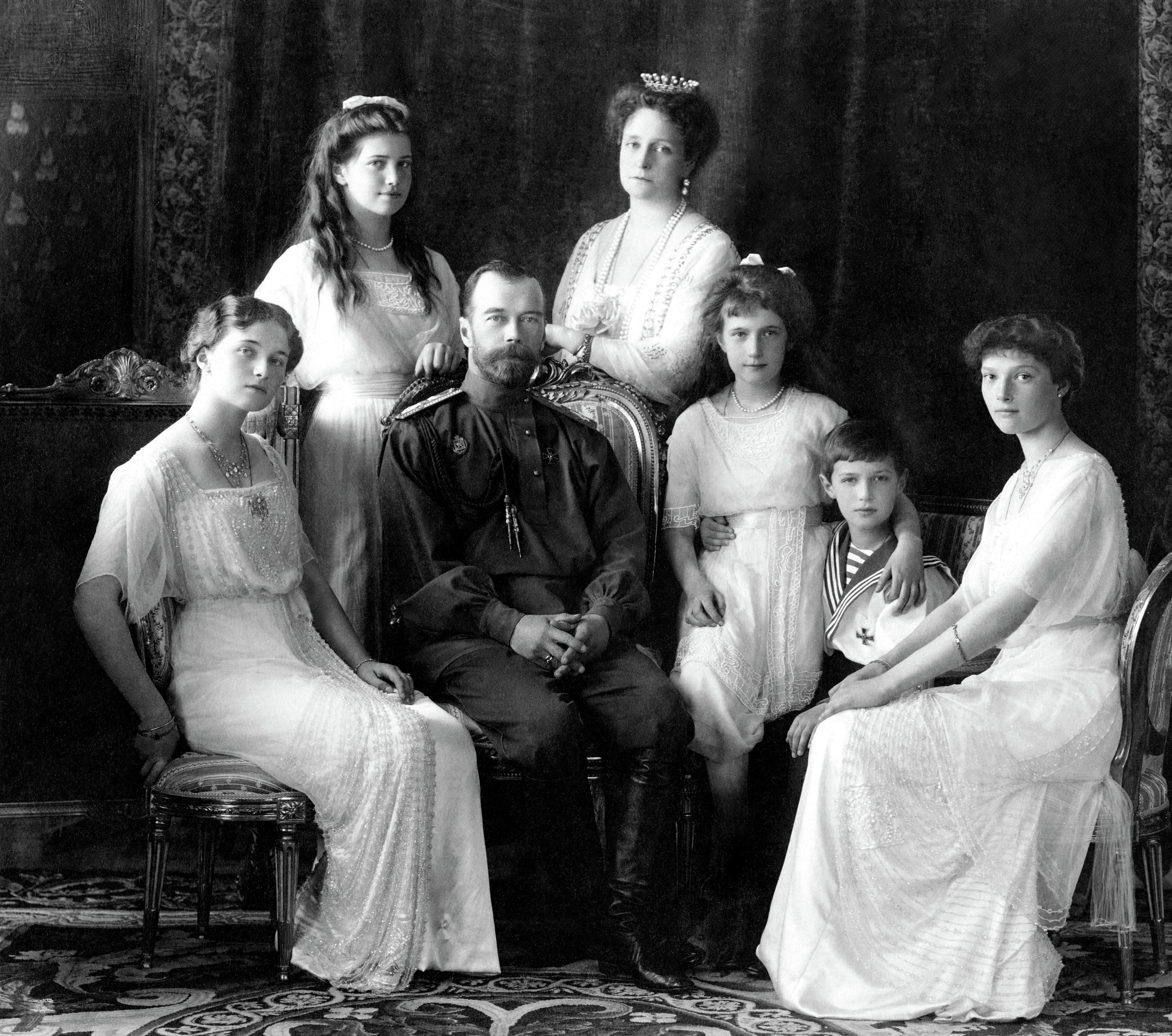
From top to bottom, left to right:
- The Spanish flu pandemic begins, killing an estimated 50 million worldwide;
- The Armistice of 11 November 1918 ends fighting on the Western Front and concludes World War I;
- The Dissolution of Austria-Hungary leads to new states such as Czechoslovakia, Yugoslavia, Austria, and Hungary;
- The German Revolution of 1918–1919 forces Kaiser Wilhelm II to abdicate and creates the Weimar Republic;
- The Hundred Days Offensive breaks German lines and collapses military resistance;
- The Murder of the Romanov family ends the Russian imperial dynasty.

1918 (MCMXVIII) was a common year starting on Tuesday of the Gregorian calendar and a common year starting on Monday of the Julian calendar, the 1918th year of the Common Era (CE) and Anno Domini (AD) designations, the 918th year of the 2nd millennium, the 18th year of the 20th century, and the 9th year of the 1910s decade. As of the start of 1918, the Gregorian calendar was 13 days ahead of the Julian calendar, which remained in localized use until 1923.

The ceasefire that effectively ended the First World War took place on the eleventh hour of the eleventh day of the eleventh month of this year. Also in this year, the Spanish flu pandemic killed 50–100 million people worldwide.

In Russia, this year runs with only 352 days. As the result of Julian to Gregorian calendar switch, 13 days needed to be skipped. Wednesday, January 31 (Julian Calendar) was immediately followed by Thursday, February 14 (Gregorian Calendar).

== Events ==
World War I will be abbreviated as "WWI"

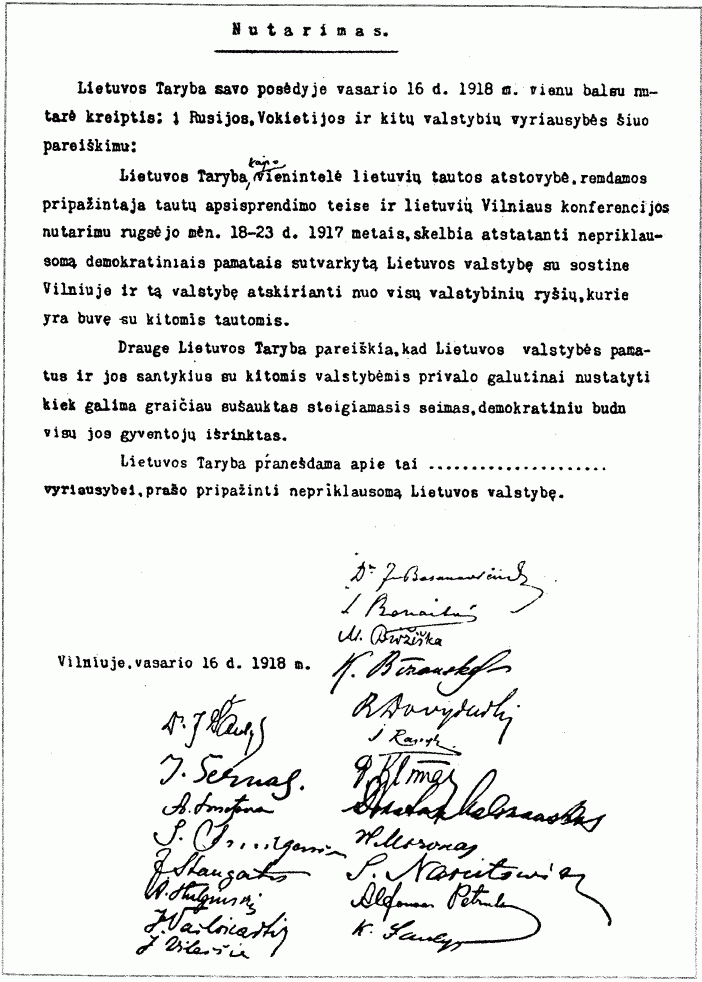
February 16: The Act of Independence of Lithuania

=== January ===
- January – 1918 flu pandemic: The "Spanish flu" (influenza) is first observed in Haskell County, Kansas.
- January 4 – The Finnish Declaration of Independence is recognized by Soviet Russia, Sweden, Germany and France.
- January 8 – American president Woodrow Wilson presents the Fourteen Points as a basis for peace negotiations to end the war.
- January 9 – Battle of Bear Valley: U.S. troops engage Yaqui Native American warriors in a minor skirmish in Arizona. This is one of the last battles of the American Indian Wars between the United States and Native Americans.
- January 15
  - The keel of HMS Hermes is laid in Britain, the first purpose-designed aircraft carrier to be laid down.
  - The Red Army (The Workers and Peasants Red Army) is formed in the Russian SFSR and Soviet Union.
- January 18 – The Historic Concert for the Benefit of Widows and Orphans of Austrian and Hungarian Soldiers is held at the Konzerthaus, Vienna.
- January 19 – The Russian Constituent Assembly proclaims the Russian Democratic Federative Republic but is dissolved by the Bolshevik government on the same day.
- January 22 – The Ukrainian People's Republic declares independence from Bolshevik Russia.
- January 25 – The Third All-Russian Congress of Soviets establishes the Russian Soviet Federative Socialist Republic.
- January 27 – The Finnish Civil War begins with the Battle of Kämärä.
- January 28 – Porvenir massacre: Texas Rangers, U.S. Cavalry soldiers and local ranchers kill 15 unarmed Mexican villagers, both men and boys.

=== February ===
- February 1 – Cattaro Mutiny: Austrian sailors in the Gulf of Cattaro (Kotor), led by two Czech Socialists, mutiny.
- February 3 – Finnish Civil War: Battle of Oulu – The White Guard defeats the Reds.
- February 5 – The SS Tuscania is torpedoed off the Irish coast; it is the first ship carrying American troops to Europe to be torpedoed and sunk.

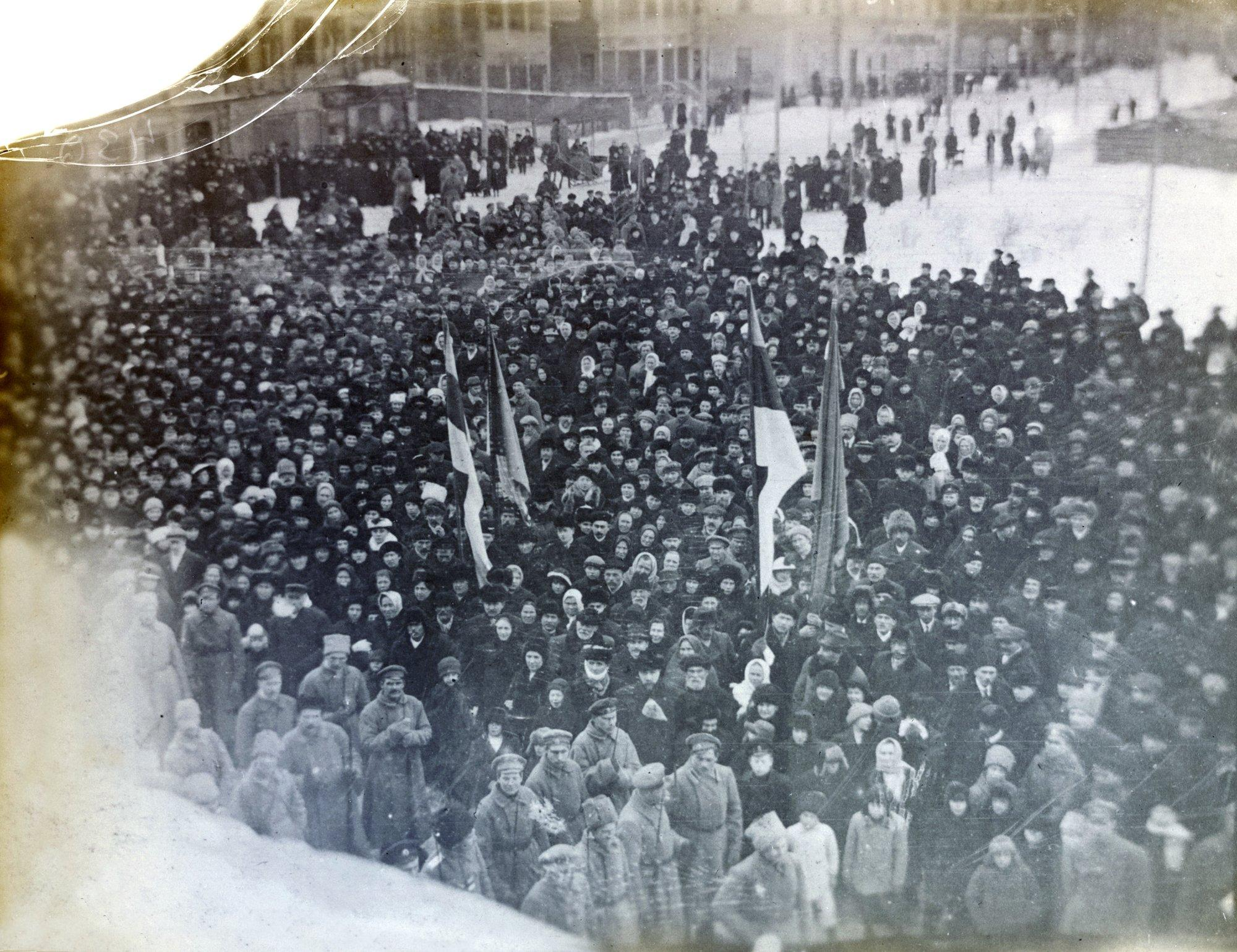
February 23: Estonian Declaration of Independence

- February 6 – Women's suffrage in the United Kingdom: Representation of the People Act gives most women over 30 the vote.
- February 10 – Deposed Sultan of the Ottoman Empire Abdul Hamid II dies in Istanbul.
- February 13 – A magnitude (M_{w}) 7.2 earthquake shakes the Chinese city of Shantou leaving 1,000 dead and causing a moderate tsunami.
- February 14 – Russia switches from the Julian calendar to the Gregorian calendar; the date skips from January 31 to February 14.
- February 16 – The Council of Lithuania adopts the Act of Independence of Lithuania, declaring Lithuania's independence from Germany, Russia or any other state.
- February 18 – Operations against the Marri and Khetran tribes in Balochistan by British authorities begin.
- February 19 – WWI: The Capture of Jericho by the Egyptian Expeditionary Force begins the British occupation of the Jordan Valley.
- February 19–25 – WWI: The Imperial Russian Navy evacuates Tallinn through thick ice, over the Gulf of Finland.
- February 23 – Estonian Declaration of Independence from Russia, after seven centuries of foreign rule; German forces capture Tallinn the following day.

=== March ===
- March 1 – WWI: German submarine U-19 sinks HMS Calgarian off Rathlin Island, Northern Ireland.
- March 3 – WWI: The Central Powers and Bolshevist Russia sign the Treaty of Brest-Litovsk, ending Russia's involvement in the war.
- March 6
  - The Finnish Army Corps of Aviation is founded as a forerunner of the Finnish Air Force (established on 4 May 1928). The blue swastika is adopted as its symbol, as a tribute to the Swedish explorer and aviator Eric von Rosen, who donated the first plane. Von Rosen had painted the Viking symbol on the plane as his personal lucky insignia.
  - The first pilotless drone, the Hewitt-Sperry Automatic Airplane developed by Elmer Ambrose Sperry and Peter Cooper Hewitt, is test-flown in Long Island, New York, but development is scrapped in 1925, after its guidance system proves unreliable.
- March 7 – WWI: Finland forms an alliance with Germany.
- March 8 – WWI: The Battle of Tell 'Asur is launched by units of the British Army's Egyptian Expeditionary Force against Ottoman defences from the Mediterranean Sea, across the Judaean Mountains to the edge of the Jordan Valley; it ends on March 12, with the move of much of the front line north into Ottoman territory.
- March 12 – Moscow becomes the capital of Soviet Russia.
- March 15 – Finnish Civil War: The battle of Tampere begins.
- March 19 – The United States Congress establishes time zones, and approves daylight saving time (DST goes into effect on March 31).
- March 21–July 18 – WWI: The Spring Offensive by the German Army along the Western Front fails to make a breakthrough, despite large losses on each side, including nearly 20,000 British Army dead on the first day, Operation Michael, on the Somme.
- March 21 – WWI: The First Transjordan attack on Amman by units of the Egyptian Expeditionary Force begins, with the passage of the Jordan River.
- March 23
  - WWI: The giant German cannon, the 'Paris Gun' (Kaiser Wilhelm Geschütz), begins to shell Paris from 114 km (71 mi) away.
  - In London at the Wood Green Empire, Chung Ling Soo (William E. Robinson, U.S.-born magician) dies during his trick, where he is supposed to "catch" two separate bullets (but one of them perforates his lung). He dies the following morning in a hospital.
- March 25
  - The Belarusian People's Republic declares independence.
  - Karl Muck, music director of the Boston Symphony Orchestra, is arrested under the Alien Enemies Act, and imprisoned for the duration of WWI.
- March 26 – Marie Stopes publishes her influential book Married Love in the U.K.
- March 27 – WWI: The First Battle of Amman is launched by units of the Egyptian Expeditionary Force, during the First Transjordan attack on Amman; it ends with their withdrawal on 31 March, back to the Jordan Valley.
- March 30 – March Days: Bolshevik and Armenian Revolutionary Federation forces suppress a Muslim revolt in Baku, Azerbaijan, resulting in up to 30,000 deaths.

=== April ===
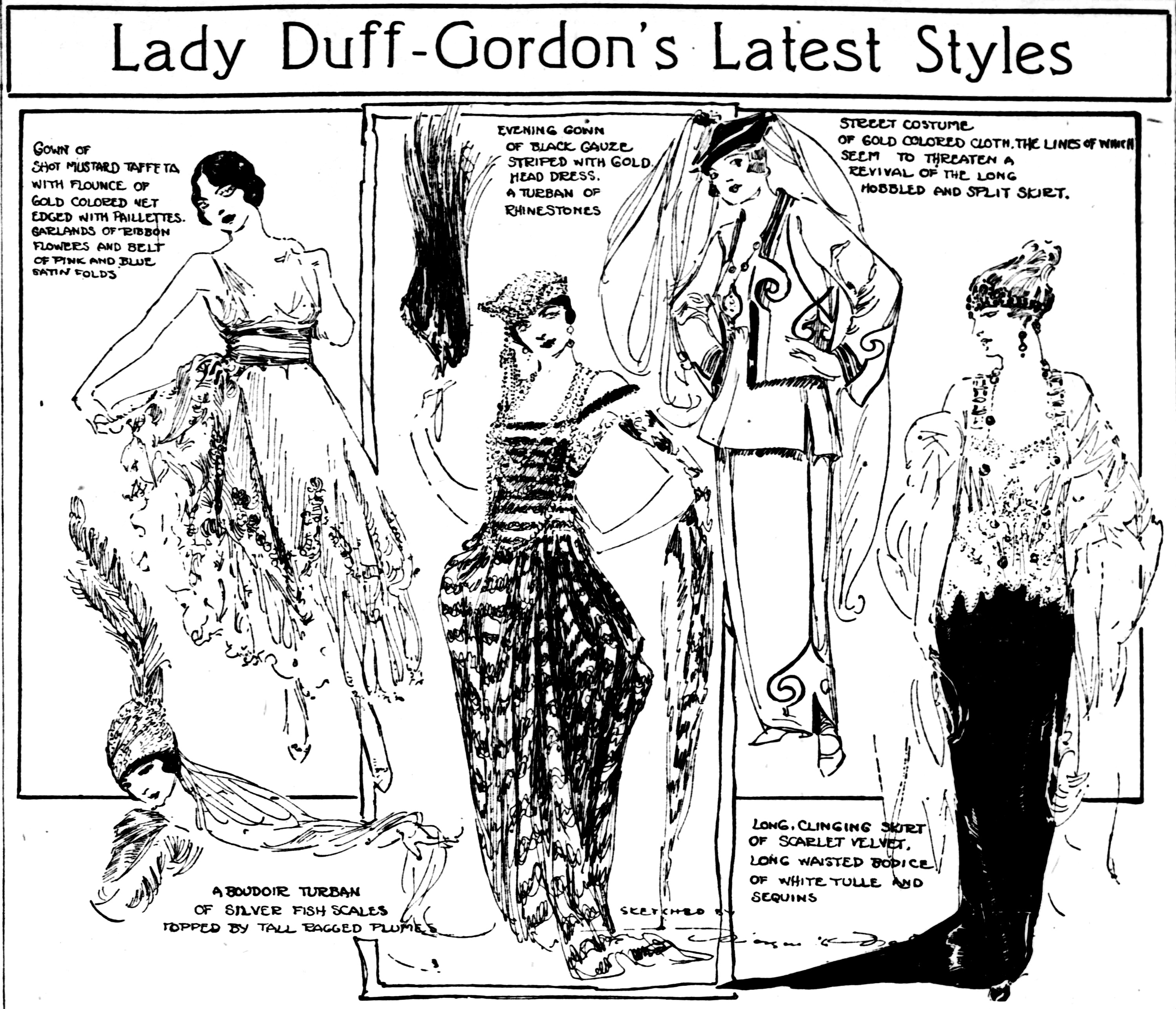
Styles of Lucy, Lady Duff-Gordon, as presented in a vaudeville circuit pantomime and sketched by Marguerite Martyn of the St. Louis Post-Dispatch in April 1918

- April 1 – The Royal Flying Corps and the Royal Naval Air Service in Britain are merged to form the Royal Air Force, the first autonomous Air Force in the world.
- April 5 – Sālote succeeds as Queen of Tonga; she will remain on the throne until her death in 1965.
- April 6 – Finnish Civil War: The battle of Tampere ends.
- April 8 – Operations against the Marri and Khetran tribes in Balochistan end with surrender to the British authorities.
- April 9 – Union of Bessarabia with Romania: Bessarabia votes to become part of the Kingdom of Romania.
- April 21 – WWI: Manfred von Richthofen, "The Red Baron", the war's most successful fighter pilot, dies in combat at Morlancourt Ridge near the Somme River.
- April 22 – Armenia, Azerbaijan, and Georgia declare their independence from Russia as the Transcaucasian Democratic Federative Republic.
- April 23 – WWI:
  - Conscription Crisis of 1918 in Ireland: A general strike is held here against conscription.
  - Zeebrugge Raid: The British Royal Navy attempts to seal off the German U-boat base here.
  - First Ostend Raid: The British Royal Navy unsuccessfully attempts to seal off the German U-boat base here.
- April 28 – WWI: Gavrilo Princip, assassin of Archduke Franz Ferdinand of Austria, dies in Terezín, Austria-Hungary, after three years in prison.
- April 30 – WWI: The Second Transjordan attack on Shunet Nimrin and Es Salt, launched by units of the Egyptian Expeditionary Force, ends on 4 May, with their withdrawal back to the Jordan Valley.

=== May ===
- May 1 – WWI: German troops enter Don Host Oblast; they capture Rostov-on-Don on May 8.
- May 2 – General Motors acquires the Chevrolet Motor Company of Delaware.
- May 7 – WWI: The British capture Kirkuk.
- May 9 – WWI – Second Ostend Raid: The British Royal Navy unsuccessfully attempts, for a second time, to seal off the German U-boat base here.
- May 11 – The Mountainous Republic of the Northern Caucasus is officially established.
- May 12 - The HMT Olympic rams into the SM U-103, sinking it. resulting in the deaths of 9 people
- May 14 – The Three Minute Pause, initiated by the daily firing of the Noon Gun on Signal Hill, is instituted by Cape Town Mayor Sir Harry Hands. It will inspire the introduction of the two-minute silence in November 1919.
- May 15
  - The Finnish Civil War ends.
  - The United States Post Office Department begins the world's third regular airmail service, between New York City, Philadelphia and Washington, D.C.
- May 16
  - The Sedition Act of 1918 is approved by the U.S. Congress.
  - The victory military parade by the Finnish White Guard is held in Helsinki celebrating their decisive victory in the Finnish Civil War. The day also begin to be celebrated on the Defence Forces Flag Day before it is moved in 1942 to the June 4th.
- May 20 – The small town of Codell, Kansas is hit for the third year in a row, on the same date, by a tornado.
- May 21 – The United States Army Aviation Section is separated from the Signal Corps, and divided into the Division of Military Aeronautics and the Bureau of Aircraft Production.
- May 24 – Women in Canada, excluding residents of Quebec, are granted the right to vote in federal elections.
- May 26 – The Transcaucasian Democratic Federative Republic is abolished; Georgia declares its independence as the Democratic Republic of Georgia.
- May 27 – WWI: The Third Battle of the Aisne commences.
- May 28 – Armenia and Azerbaijan declare their independence as the First Republic of Armenia and the Azerbaijan Democratic Republic respectively.
- May 29 – WWI: The week-long Battle of Sardarabad concludes with defending Armenian forces victorious over the Ottomans.
- May 29–30 – WWI: Battle of Skra di Legen – The Greek National Defence Army Corps defeats the Bulgarians.

=== June ===
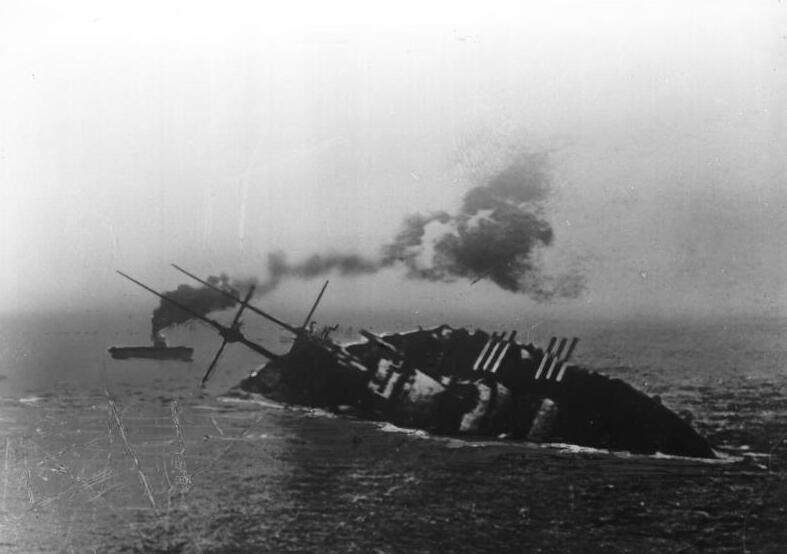
June 10: Austro-Hungarian battleship Szent István sunk by Italian torpedo boats

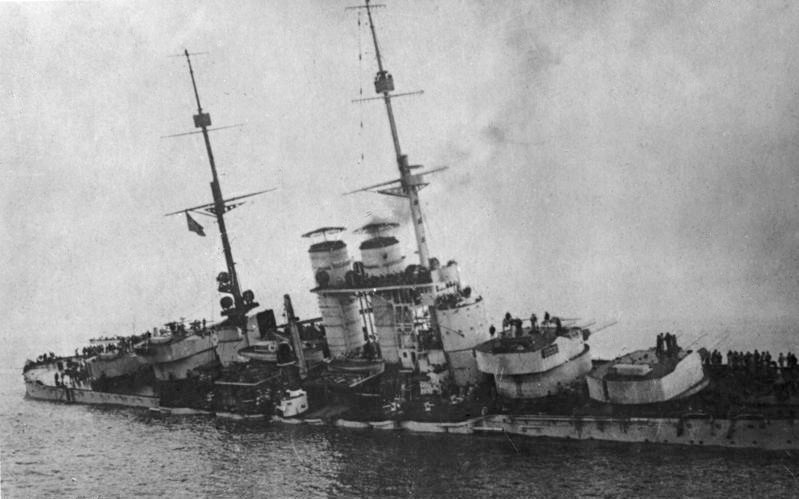
Szent István

- June–August – The "Spanish flu" becomes pandemic. Over 30 million people die in the following 6 months.
- June 1 – WWI: The Battle of Belleau Wood begins.
- June 4 – RMS Kenilworth Castle, one of the Union-Castle Line steamships, collides with her escort destroyer HMS Rival while trying to avoid her other escort, the cruiser HMS Kent.
- June 8 – V603 Aquilae, the brightest nova observed since Kepler's of 1604, is discovered.
- June 10 – WWI: The Austro-Hungarian dreadnought battleship SMS Szent István is sunk by two Italian MAS motor torpedo boats off the Dalmatian coast.
- June 12
  - Grand Duke Michael of Russia is murdered, thereby becoming the first of the Romanovs to be killed by the Bolsheviks.
  - WWI: The first airplane bombing raid by an American unit in France is carried out.
- June 16 – The Declaration to the Seven, a British government response to a memorandum issued anonymously by seven Syrian notables, is published.
- June 22 – Suspects in the Chicago Restaurant Poisonings are arrested, and more than 100 waiters are taken into custody for poisoning restaurant customers with a lethal powder called Mickey Finn.
- June 29 – Bronx International Exposition of Science, Arts and Industries opens in New York; Brazil is the only international exhibitor and the exposition closes at the end of the season.

=== July ===
- July 3 – Allied intervention in the Russian Civil War: The Siberian Intervention is launched by the Allies, to extract the Czechoslovak Legion from the Russian Civil War.
- July 4 – Mehmed VI succeeds as Sultan of the Ottoman Empire on the death of his half-brother Mehmed V (Reşâd, who has reigned since 1909), himself reigning until the Sultanate is abolished in 1922.
- July 12 – The Imperial Japanese Navy battleship Kawachi blows up off Tokuyama, Yamaguchi, western Honshu, Japan, killing at least 621.
- July 13 – The National Czechoslovak Committee is established.
- July 14 – The film The Glorious Adventure is released in the United States, featuring Mammy Lou, who becomes one of the oldest people ever to star in a film, at a claimed age of 114.
- July 14 – WWI:
  - Second Battle of the Marne: The battle begins near the River Marne, with a German attack.
  - Quentin Roosevelt, Theodore Roosevelt's youngest son, is killed in action during the Second Battle of the Marne.
- July 17
  - WWI: RMS Carpathia (famed for rescuing survivors of the RMS Titanic) is torpedoed and sunk off the east coast of Ireland, by Imperial German Navy submarine U-55; 218 of the 223 on board are rescued.
  - Execution of the Romanov family: By order of the Bolshevik Party, and carried out by the Cheka, former emperor Nicholas II, his wife Alexandra Feodorovna, their children, Olga, Tatiana, Maria, Anastasia, Alexei and retainers are shot at the Ipatiev House, in Ekaterinburg, Russia.

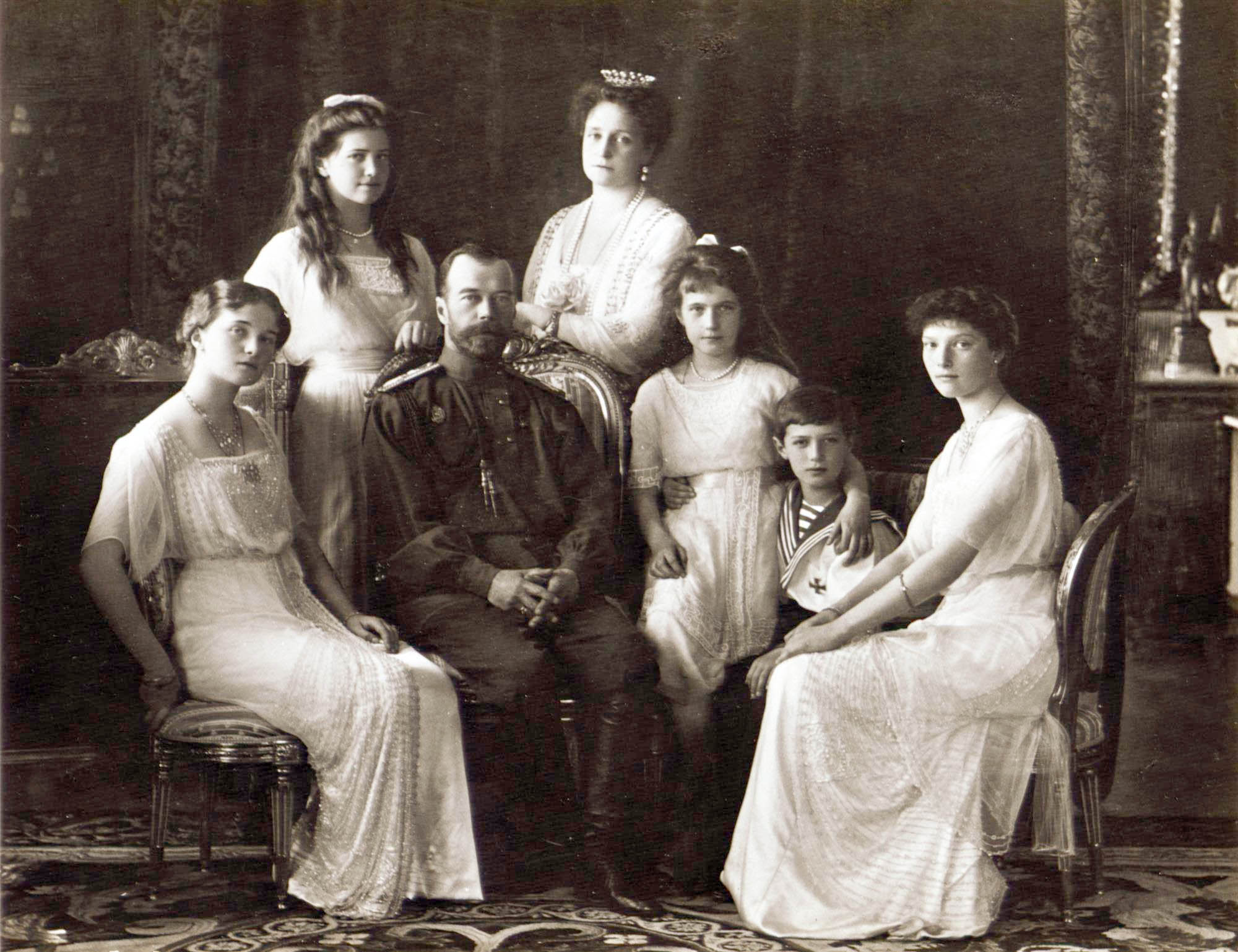
July 17: Execution of the Romanov family

- July 18 – The Cheka kill the Martyrs of Alapayevsk, six further members of the Romanov family and retainers, by throwing them down a mineshaft.
- July 21 – WWI: Attack on Orleans – Imperial German submarine SM U-156 surfaces and fires on a small convoy of barges and defending flying boats off the Cape Cod town of Orleans, Massachusetts.

=== August ===
- August 2 – North Russia Intervention: Anti-Bolshevik forces stage a coup at Arkhangelsk, and an occupation by Allied forces follows.
- August 3 – WWI: Australian hospital ship HMAT Warilda is torpedoed and sunk in the English Channel on passage from Le Havre to Southampton by German submarine SM UC-49 with the loss of 123 of the 801 people on board.
- August 8 – WWI: Battle of Amiens – British, Canadian and Australian troops begin a string of almost continuous victories, the 'Hundred Days Offensive', with an 8-mile push through the German front lines, taking 12,000 prisoners. German General Erich Ludendorff later calls this the "black day of the German Army".
- August 10 – Russian Revolution: The British commander in Archangel is told to help the White Russians.
- August 16 – The Battle of Lake Baikal is fought by the Czechoslovak legion, against the Red Army.
- August 21 – WWI: The Second Battle of the Somme begins.
- August 23 – The Bessarabian Peasants' Party is created.
- August 27 – Battle of Ambos Nogales: U.S. Army forces skirmish against Mexican Carrancistas and their German advisors at Nogales, Arizona, in the only battle of WWI fought on United States soil.
- August 30
  - In response to the October Revolution in Russia, Vladimir Lenin is shot and wounded by Fanny Kaplan in Moscow, but survives.
  - Moisei Uritsky, the Petrograd head of the Cheka, is assassinated.

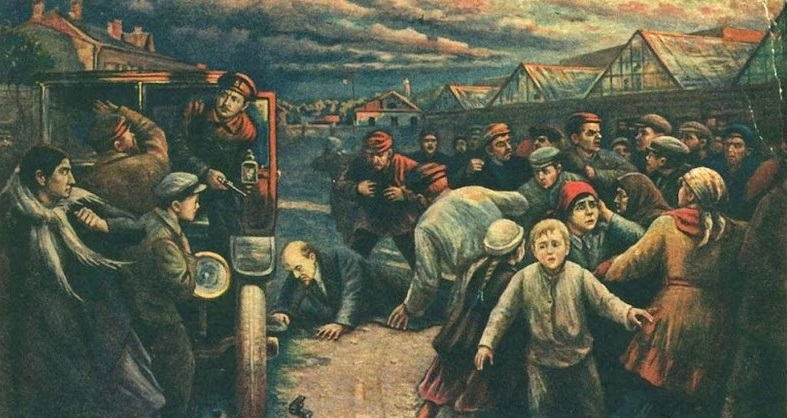
August 30: Attempted assassination of Lenin, depicted by Vladimir Pchelin

=== September ===
- September – WWI: British armies and their Arab allies roll into Syria.
- September 3 – The Bolshevik government of Russia publishes the first official announcement of the Red Terror, a period of repression against political opponents, as an "Appeal to the Working Class" in the newspaper Izvestia.
- September 4 – WWI: Battle of Mont Saint-Quentin concludes with the Australian Corps breaking the German line.
- September 5 – Russian Civil War: The Kazan Operation begins. The event continues for 5 days, and solidifies the Red Army's power in Russia over the White Army.
- September 12 – WWI: Battle of Havrincourt – The British take a German salient.
- September 12–15 – WWI: Battle of Saint-Mihiel – Americans take a German salient.
- September 14 – WWI: The Balkan front offensive by the Serbian Army begins.
- September 15–18 – WWI: Battle of Dobro Pole in the Vardar Offensive of the Balkans Campaign: The Allied Army of the Orient defeats Bulgarian defenders.
- September 18 – WWI: Battle of Épehy – British approach the Hindenburg Line along the St Quentin Canal.
- September 19 – WWI:
  - The British Army's Egyptian Expeditionary Force launches the Battle of Megiddo, incorporating the Battle of Sharon, and the Battle of Nablus, an attack in the Judaean Mountains. This day are fought the Battle of Tulkarm, and the Battle of Arara, which break the Ottoman front line stretching from the Mediterranean coast to the Judaean Mountains, while the Battle of Tabsor extends into September 20.
  - The Third Transjordan attack in the Jordan Valley begins.
- September 20 – WWI: The British Army's Desert Mounted Corps launches the
  - Battle of Nazareth by 5th Cavalry Division (British Indian Army);
  - Capture of Afulah and Beisan by the 4th Cavalry Division (British Indian Army);
  - Capture of Jenin by the Australian Mounted Division, almost encircling the Yildirim Army Group still in the Judaean Mountains.
- September 25 – WWI:
  - The Battle of Megiddo ends with the Battle of Haifa, Battle of Samakh, and Capture of Tiberias.
  - The Third Transjordan attack ends with ANZAC Mounted Division victory at the Second Battle of Amman, with the subsequent capture at Ziza of the Ottoman II Corps, and more than 10,000 Ottoman and German prisoners.
- September 26 – WWI:
  - The Meuse–Argonne offensive begins, the largest and bloodiest operation of the war for the American Expeditionary Forces.
  - The Capture of Damascus begins, with the Charge at Irbid by the 4th Cavalry Division (India).
  - United States Coast Guard cutter Tampa is torpedoed and sunk in the Bristol Channel by German submarine SM UB-91 with the loss of all 131 on board, the greatest loss of life for any US combat vessel in the war.
- September 27 – WWI
  - The Battle of the Canal du Nord, launched by British and Empire forces, continues the advance towards the Hindenburg Line.
  - The Battle of Jisr Benat Yakub, launched by the Australian Mounted Division, continues the advance towards Damascus.
- September 29 – WWI:
  - Battle of St Quentin Canal begins; Allied forces advance towards the Hindenburg Line.
  - Bulgaria requests an armistice, with the Armistice of Salonica being signed and coming into force the next day.
- September 30 – WWI:
  - The Charge at Kaukab is begun by units of the Australian Mounted Division.
  - The Charge at Kiswe is begun by 4th Cavalry Division, continuing the Desert Mounted Corps' advance to Damascus.

=== October ===
- October 1 – WWI: The Desert Mounted Corps captures Damascus.
- October 2 – WWI: The Charge at Khan Ayash is begun north of Damascus, by the 3rd Light Horse Brigade.
- October 3
  - Kaiser Wilhelm II of Germany appoints Max von Baden Chancellor of Germany.
  - King Ferdinand I of Bulgaria abdicates in the wake of the Bulgarian military collapse in WWI. He is succeeded by his son, Boris III.
  - WWI: The Pursuit to Haritan by the Desert Mounted Corps begins.
- October 4
  - Wilhelm II of Germany forms a new, liberal government to sue for peace.
  - The T. A. Gillespie Company Shell Loading Plant explosion in New Jersey kills 100+, and destroys enough ammunition to supply the Western Front for 6 months.
- October 7 – The Regency Council (Poland) declares Polish independence from the German Empire, and demands that Germany cede the Polish provinces of Poznań, Upper Silesia and Polish Pomerania.
- October 8–10 – WWI: Second Battle of Cambrai: British and Canadian troops take Cambrai from the Germans and the First and Third British Armies break through the Hindenburg Line.
- October 8 – WWI: In the Forest of Argonne in France, U.S. Corporal Alvin C. York almost single-handedly kills 25 German soldiers and captures 132.
- October 9 – Landgrave Prince Frederick Charles of Hesse is elected King of Finland.
- October 11 – The magnitude (M_{w}) 7.1 San Fermín earthquake shakes Puerto Rico with a maximum Mercalli intensity of IX (Violent), killing 76–116 people. A destructive tsunami contributes to the damage and loss of life.
- October 12 – Cloquet Fire: The city of Cloquet, Minnesota, and nearby areas are destroyed in a fire, killing 453.
- October 16 – Emperor Karl IV of Austria publishes the Völkermanifest manifesto, declaring the Cisleithanian part of the empire will be federalized on the basis of national councils
- October 18 – The Washington Declaration proclaims the independent Czechoslovak Republic. The general strike of 14 October 1918.
- October 21 – German representatives of the Reichsrat in Austria-Hungary form the Provisional National Assembly for German-Austria
- October 24 – WWI: The Battle of Vittorio Veneto opens.
- October 25
  - WWI: Aleppo is captured, by Prince Feisal's Sheifial Forces.
  - The steamer Princess Sophia sinks on Vanderbilt Reef near Juneau, Alaska; 353 people die, in the greatest maritime disaster in the Pacific Northwest.
- October 26 – WWI – Charge at Haritan: Units of the Desert Mounted Corps battle with Ottoman forces for the last time in WWI.
- October 28
  - Czechoslovakia declares its independence from Austria-Hungary.
  - A new Polish government is declared in Western Galicia (Eastern Europe).
- October 29
  - The Wilhelmshaven mutiny of the German High Seas Fleet breaks out.
  - The State of Slovenes, Croats and Serbs declares its independence from Austria-Hungary.
- October 30
  - The Martin Declaration is published, including Slovakia in the formation of the Czecho-Slovak state.
  - The Armistice of Mudros ends conflict between the Ottoman Empire and the Allies of World War I, and grants independence to the Mutawakkilite Kingdom of Yemen.
- October 31 – Revolution overthrows the pro-Habsburg government in Hungary, effectively dissolving the Austro-Hungarian Empire.

=== November ===
- November 1
  - The Polish–Ukrainian War is inaugurated, by the proclamation of the West Ukrainian People's Republic in Galicia, with a capital at Lwów.
  - Serbian forces recapture Belgrade.
  - Malbone Street Wreck: The worst rapid transit accident in world history occurs under the intersection of Malbone Street and Flatbush Avenue, in Brooklyn, New York City, with at least 93 dead.
- November 3
  - WWI: The Armistice of Villa Giusti is signed between Austria-Hungary and the Allies near Padua.
  - Poland declares its independence from Russia.
  - German Revolution: Kiel mutiny by sailors in the German fleet at Kiel while throughout northern Germany soldiers and workers begin to establish revolutionary councils on the Russian soviet model.
- November 4 – WWI: The Armistice of Villa Giusti comes into effect, ending warfare between Italy and Austria-Hungary on the Italian Front.
- November 6 – A new Polish government is proclaimed in Lublin.
- November 7 – King Ludwig of Bavaria flees his country.
- November 8 – The German army withdraws its support of the Kaiser. The German Armistice delegation arrives at the Forest of Compiègne in France.

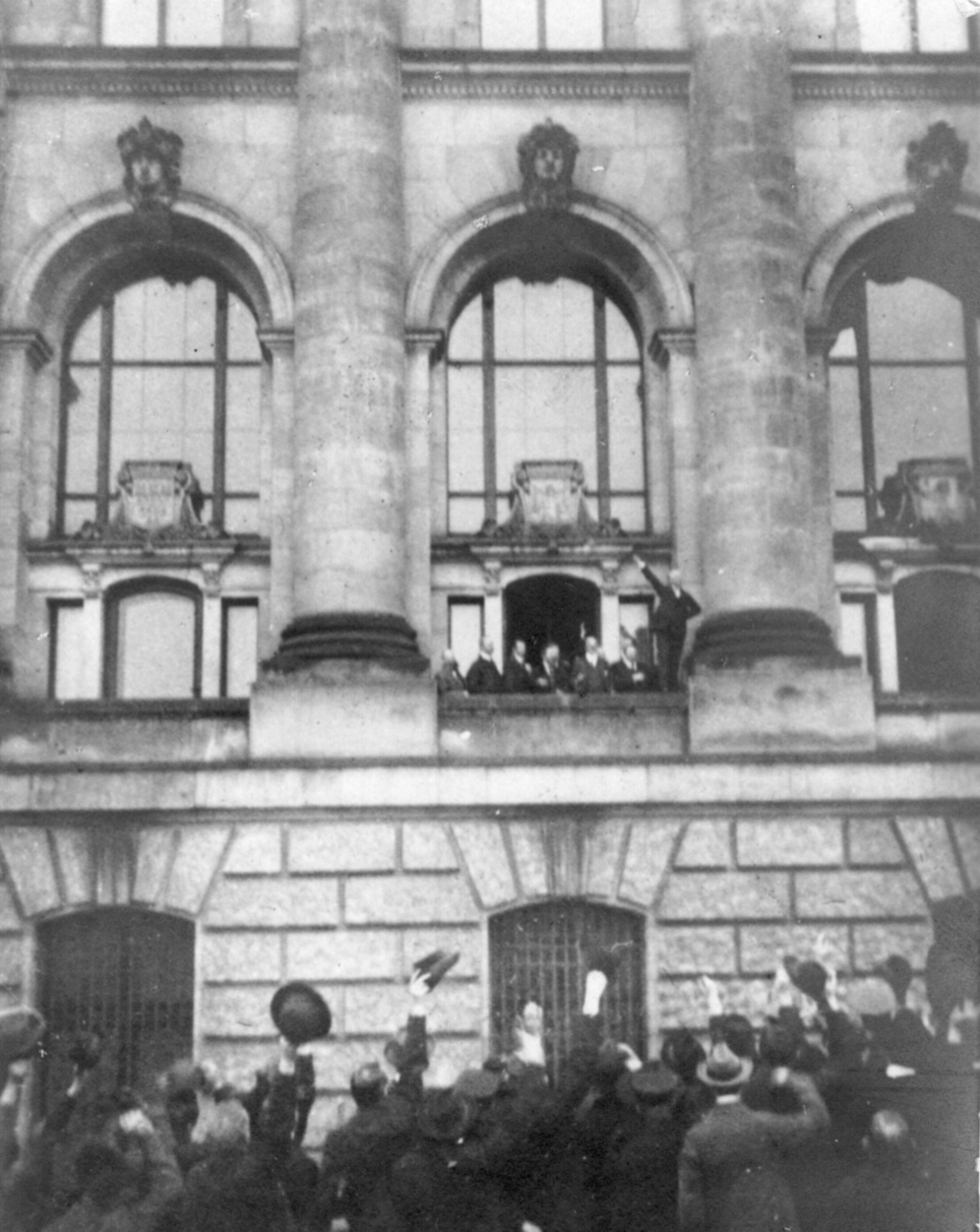
November 9: Proclamation of German Republic by Philipp Scheidemann in Berlin on the Reichstag balcony

- November 9
  - Kaiser Wilhelm II of Germany abdicates and chooses to live in exile in the Netherlands.
  - Proclamation of the republic in Germany by Philipp Scheidemann in Berlin, on the Reichstag balcony. One of several significant events on 9 November in German history.
  - Provisional National Council Minister-President Kurt Eisner declares Bavaria to be a republic.
  - British battleship HMS Britannia is sunk by a German submarine off Trafalgar, with the loss of around fifty lives (the last major naval engagement of WWI).

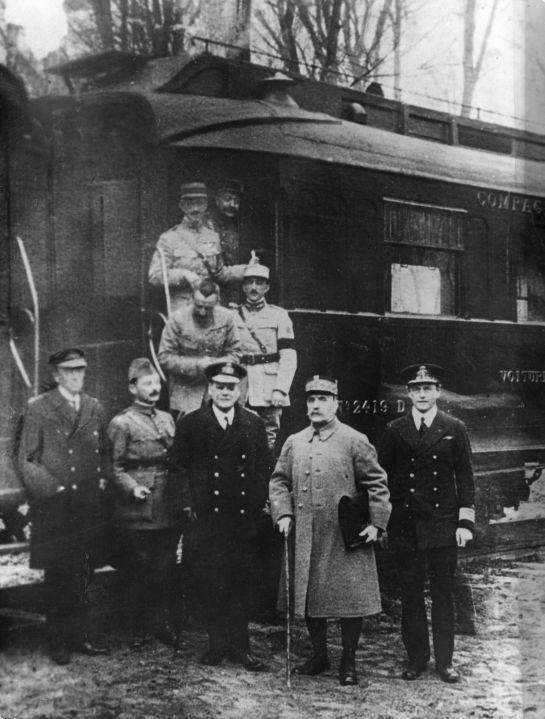
Signatories to the Armistice of 11 November 1918 with Germany, ending WWI, pose outside Marshal Foch's railway carriage

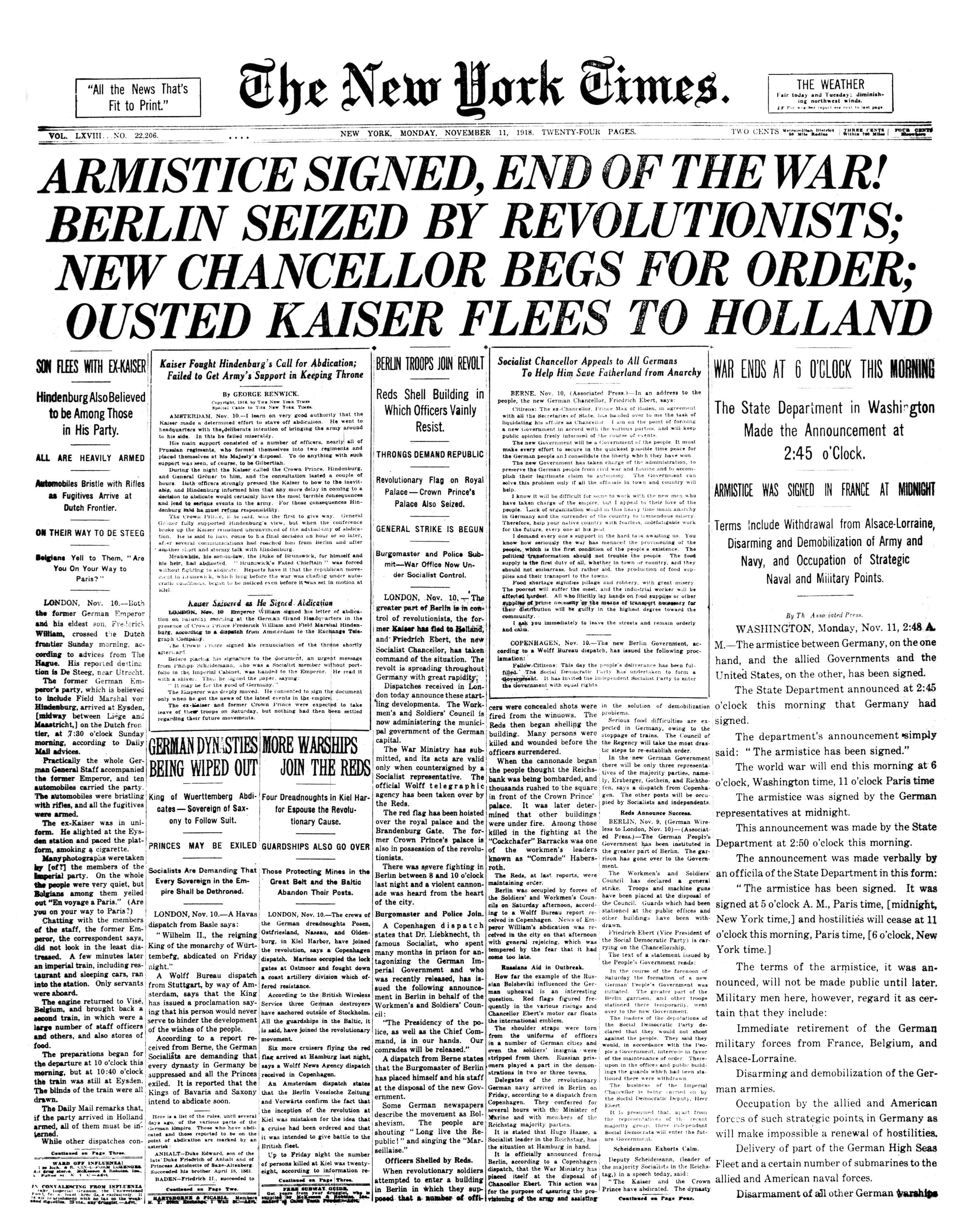
November 11: Front page of The New York Times on Armistice Day

- November 10 Luxembourg communist forces rebel in Luxembourg city, beginning the Luxembourg rebellions.
- November 11
  - End of WWI: Armistice of 11 November 1918 – Germany signs an armistice agreement with the Allies, between 5:12 AM and 5:20 AM, in the "Compiègne Wagon", Marshal Foch's railroad car, in the Forest of Compiègne in France. It becomes official on the 11th hour of the 11th day of the 11th month. At 10:59 U.S. soldier Henry Gunther becomes (probably) the last killed in action.
  - Poland regains independence, after 123 years of partitions. Józef Piłsudski is appointed Commander-in-Chief.
  - Emperor Charles I of Austria gives up his absolute power, but does not abdicate.
  - Loppem Agreements: Start of a series of political meetings between King Albert I and Belgian liberals and socialists.
  - Red Week: Pieter Jelles Troelstra gives a speech calling for socialist revolution in the Netherlands.
- November 12 – Austria becomes a republic.
- November 13
  - The Allied Occupation of Constantinople begins.
  - Frederick II, Grand Duke of Baden, relinquishes all governing duties.
- November 14
  - Czechoslovakia becomes a republic.
  - The Second Polish Republic is proclaimed with Józef Piłsudski as head of state.
  - The provisional government of Baden proclaims the "Free People's Republic of Baden" (Freie Volksrepublik Baden).
  - Ernest Louis, Grand Duke of Hesse, is forced from his throne, leading to the establishment of the People's State of Hesse.
  - Frederick Francis IV, Grand Duke of Mecklenburg-Schwerin abdicates his throne, leading to the establishment of the Free State of Mecklenburg-Schwerin.
  - Charles Edward, Duke of Saxe-Coburg and Gotha, announces he is ceasing to rule Saxe-Coburg and Gotha, leading to the establishment of the Free State of Coburg and the Free State of Saxe-Gotha.
  - German East African troops are informed of the November 11 armistice.
- November 16 – The Hungarian Democratic Republic is declared, marking Hungary's independence from Austria.
- November 18 – Latvia declares its independence from Russia.
- November 20 – U-boats start to rendezvous off Harwich, to begin the surrender of the High Seas Fleet to the British Royal Navy; in the following week the German warships are escorted to internment in Scapa Flow.
- November 21 – Lwów pogrom: Polish troops, volunteers and freed criminals massacre at least 320 Ukrainian Christians and Jews in Lwów, Galicia.
- November 22
  - The Belgian royal family returns to Brussels after the war, King Albert I having commanded the Allied army group in the September–October Courtrai offensive, which liberated his country.
  - Frederick II, Grand Duke of Baden, abdicates; the Grand Duchy of Baden gives way to the Republic of Baden.
- November 23 – British military government of Palestine begins.
- November 25 – General Paul von Lettow-Vorbeck, German commander in German East Africa, signs a ceasefire at Abercorn in Northern Rhodesia.
- November 26 – The Podgorica Assembly ('Great National Assembly of the Serb People in Montenegro') votes for a "union of the people" between the kingdoms of Montenegro and Serbia and for deposition of the exiled King Nicholas I of Montenegro.
- November 28 – Estonian War of Independence: The Red Army invades Estonia, starting the war. The Commune of the Working People of Estonia is established as a Soviet puppet state in Narva on the next day.
- November 29 – Serbia annexes Montenegro, suspending the latter's existence as a sovereign state for nearly the entirety of the following 88 years.
- November 30 – Ernest Ansermet conducts the first concert by the Orchestre de la Suisse Romande.

=== December ===
- December 1
  - By the Danish–Icelandic Act of Union, Iceland regains independence, but remains in personal union with the King of Denmark, who also becomes the King of Iceland.
  - New voting laws in Sweden makes votes no longer dependent on taxable assets, each adult having one vote.
  - The Union of Alba Iulia is proclaimed: Following the March 27 incorporation of Bessarabia and Bucovina, Transylvania unites with the Kingdom of Romania.
  - The Kingdom of Serbs, Croats and Slovenes (which later becomes the Kingdom of Yugoslavia) is proclaimed, in particular ending Serbia's existence as a sovereign state for the next 87 years (it would not regain its sovereignty until 2006).

Flag of the Kingdom of Serbs, Croats and Slovenes

- December 4 – President Woodrow Wilson departs by ship to the Paris Peace Conference, becoming the first United States President to travel to Europe while holding office.
- December 5 – Estonian War of Independence: The British light cruiser HMS Cassandra strikes a mine and sinks near Saaremaa in the Baltic Sea, killing 11 sailors.
- December 6 – A magnitude (M_{w}) 7.2 earthquake shakes British Columbia.
- December 14
  - Prince Frederick Charles of Hesse renounces the Finnish throne.
  - Portuguese President Sidónio Pais is assassinated.
  - Giacomo Puccini's comic opera Gianni Schicchi premiered at the Metropolitan Opera in New York City.
- December 16 – Vincas Mickevičius-Kapsukas declares the formation of the Lithuanian Soviet Socialist Republic, a puppet state created by the Russian SFSR to justify the Lithuanian–Soviet War.
- December 17 – Darwin Rebellion in Australia: Disaffected workers march on Government House, Darwin, demanding the resignation of the Administrator of the Northern Territory, John A. Gilruth.
- December 20 – Tomáš Garrigue Masaryk returns to the Czechoslovak Republic.
- December 21 – Estonian War of Independence: The Red Army captures Tartu, Estonia.
- December 25 – Der Stahlhelm, Bund der Frontsoldaten, is formed in Germany as a nationalist veterans' organization.
- December 27 – Greater Poland Uprising (1918–19): Poles in Greater Poland (the former Grand Duchy of Posen) rise up against the Germans, ignited by a patriotic speech made in Poznań by pianist and politician Ignacy Jan Paderewski.
- December 28 – Sinn Féin enjoys a landslide victory of the Irish seats at the 1918 United Kingdom general election, winning 73 of the 105 seats in Ireland. In accordance with their manifesto, Sinn Féin members will not take their seats in the Palace of Westminster but will form the First Dáil in Dublin. Countess Constance Markievicz, while detained in Holloway Prison (London), becomes the first woman elected to (but does not take her seat in) the British House of Commons.
- December 31 – A British-brokered ceasefire ends the two weeks of fighting in the Georgian–Armenian War.}

== Births ==
=== January ===
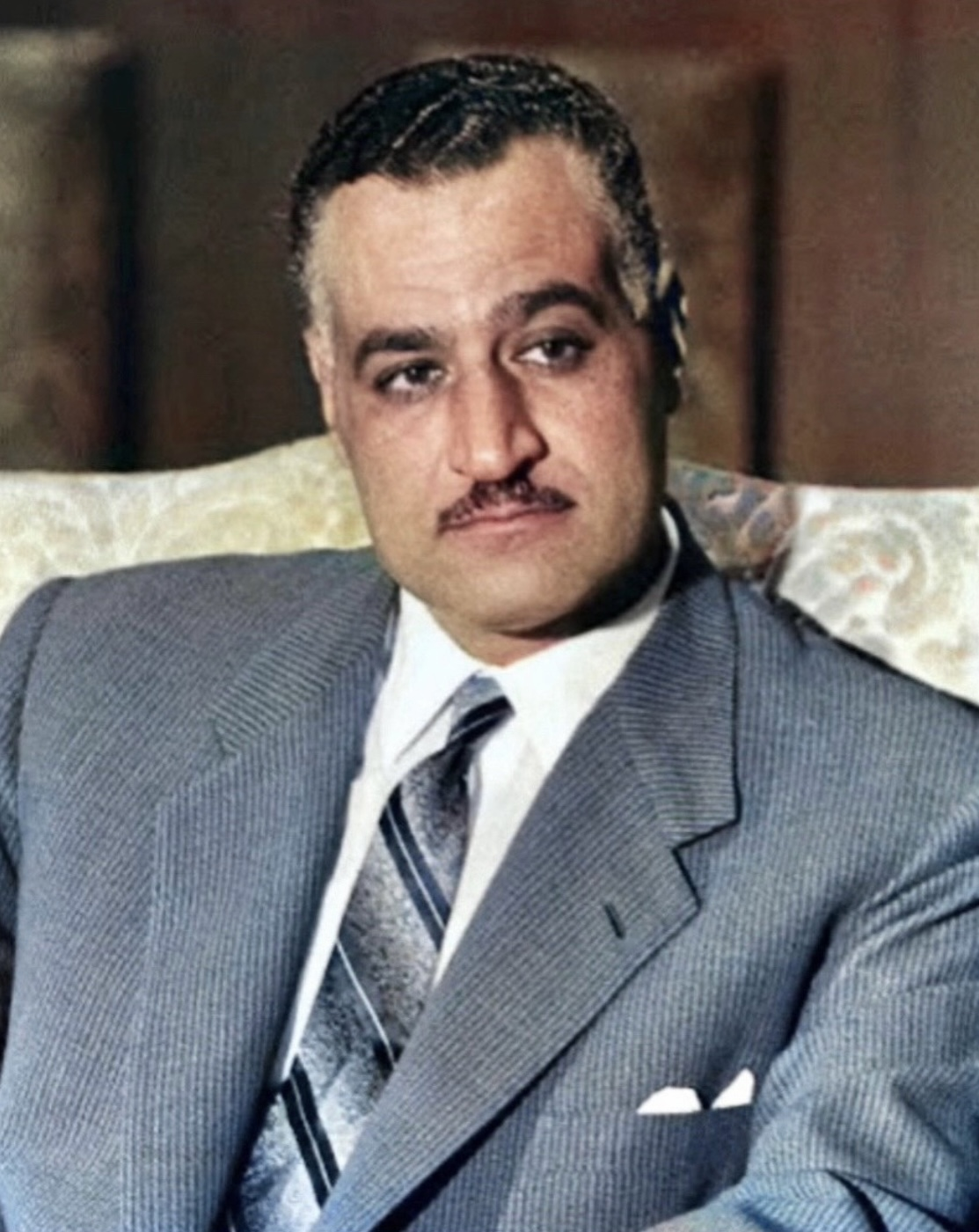
Gamal Abdel Nasser

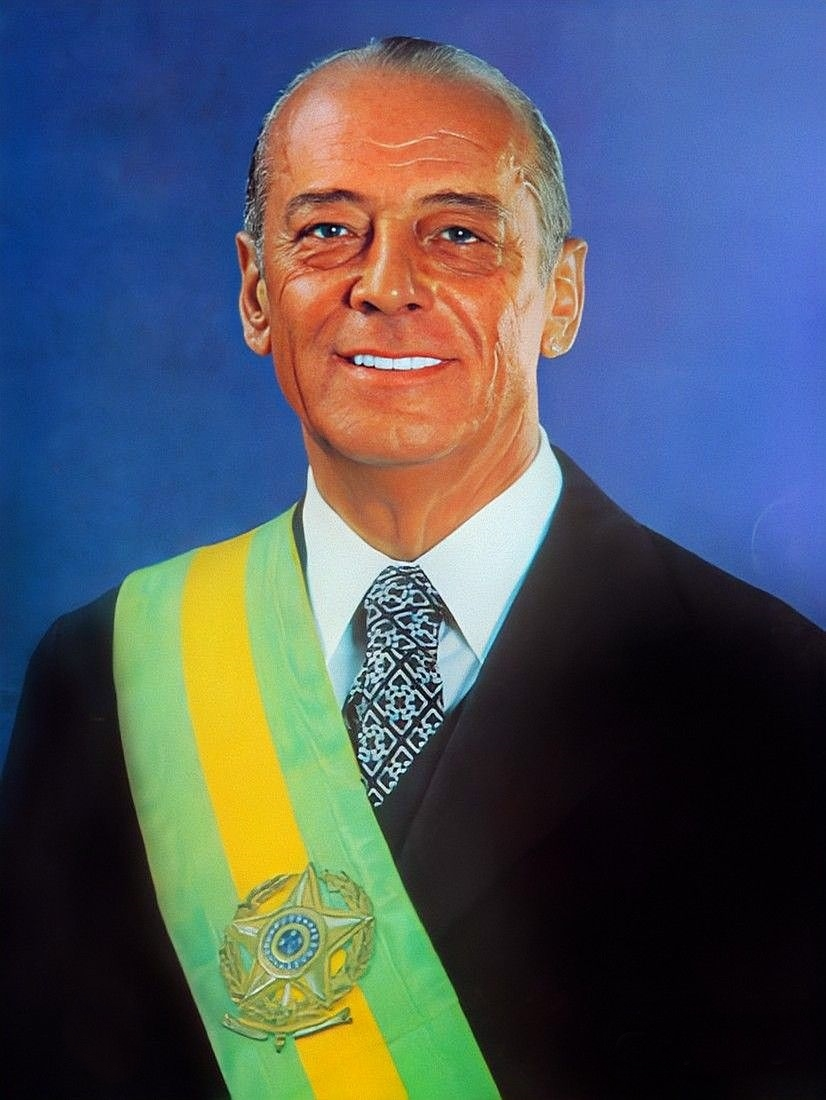
João Figueiredo

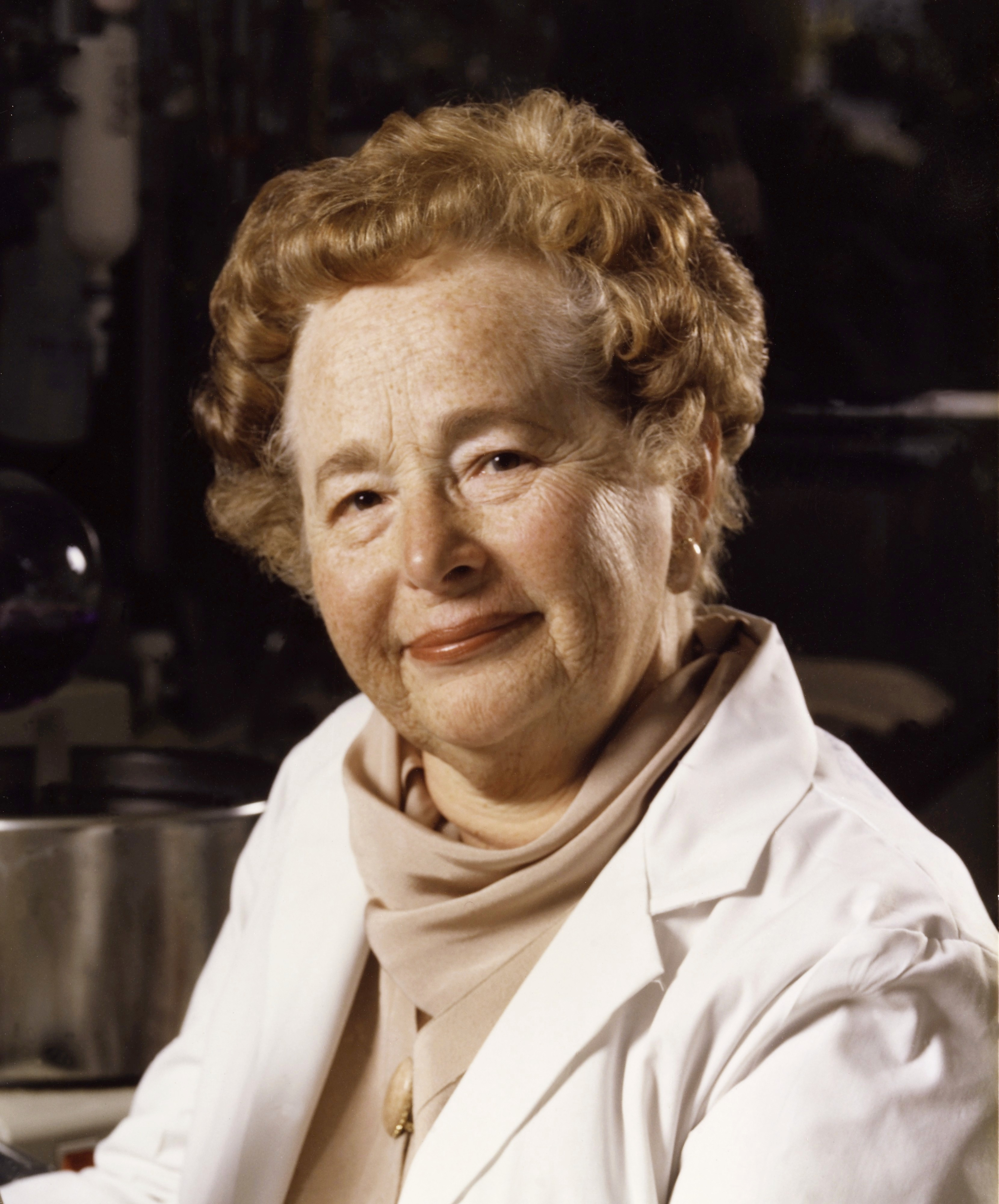
Gertrude B. Elion

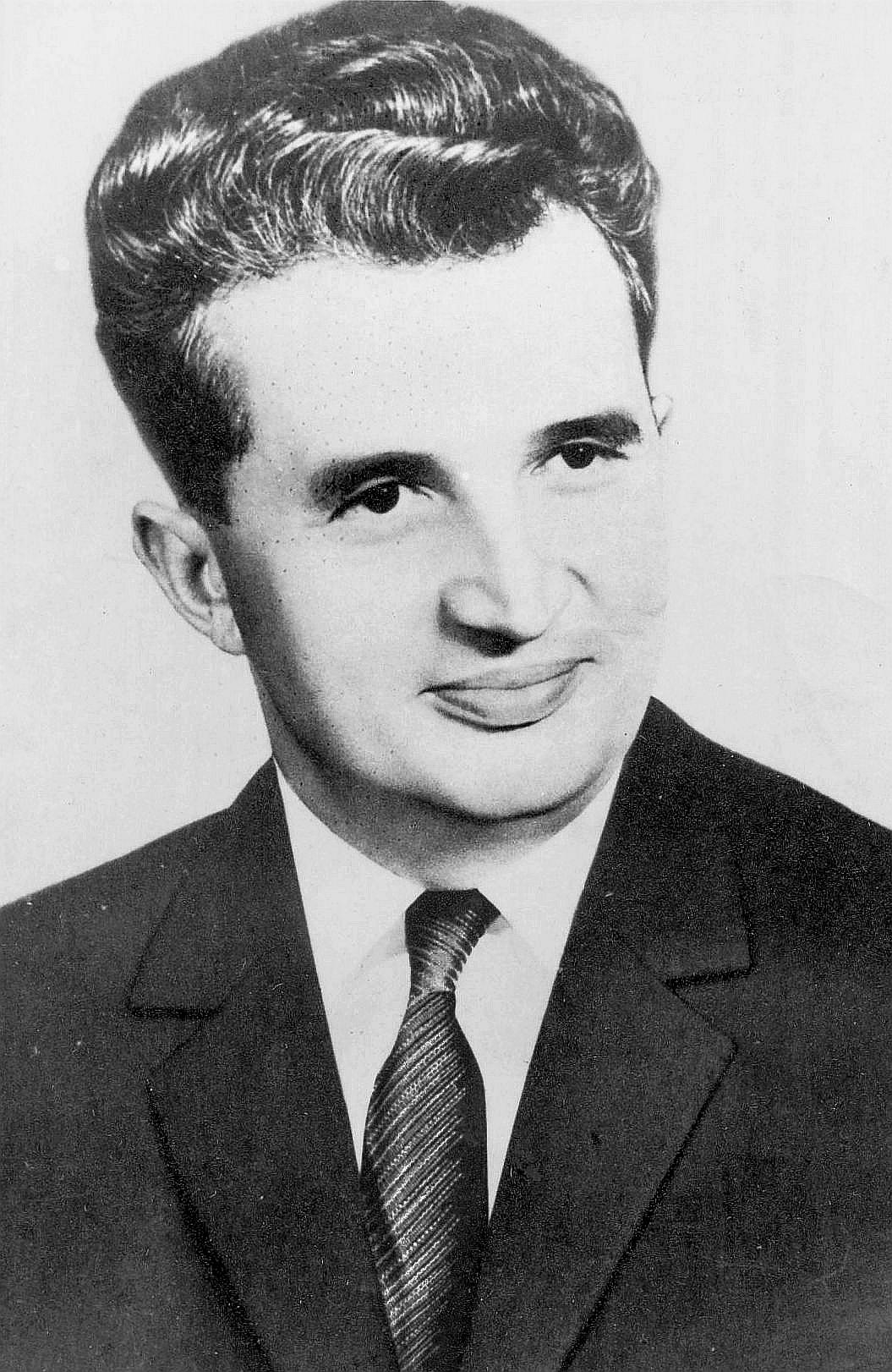
Nicolae Ceaușescu

- January 1 – Patrick Anthony Porteous, Scottish recipient of the Victoria Cross (d. 2000)
- January 2
  - Willi Graf, member of the White Rose resistance group in Nazi Germany (d. 1943)
  - Gudrun Zapf-von Hesse, German typographer, calligrapher and book-binder (d. 2019)
- January 10 – Arthur Chung, 1st President of Guyana (d. 2008)
- January 11 – Kassim Al-Rimawi, Prime Minister of Jordan (d. 1982)
- January 15
  - João Figueiredo, 30th President of Brazil (d. 1999)
  - Gamal Abdel Nasser, 2nd President of Egypt (d. 1970)
- January 16 – Stirling Silliphant, American writer, producer (d. 1996)
- January 17
  - Kamal Amrohi, Indian director, screenwriter (d. 1993)
  - George M. Leader, American politician (d. 2013)
- January 20 – Juan García Esquivel, Mexican bandleader (d. 2002)
- January 21
  - Chicháy, Filipino actress (d. 1993)
  - Richard Winters, U.S. Army officer (d. 2011)
- January 22 – Elmer Lach, Canadian ice hockey player (d. 2015)
- January 23 – Gertrude B. Elion, American scientist, recipient of the Nobel Prize in Physiology or Medicine (d. 1999)
- January 24 – Oral Roberts, American neo-Pentecostal televangelist (d. 2009)
- January 26
  - Nicolae Ceaușescu, Romanian communist politician and leader (d. 1989)
  - Philip José Farmer, American writer (d. 2009)
- January 27
  - Skitch Henderson, English-born musician, bandleader (d. 2005)
  - Elmore James, American musician (d. 1963)
- January 29
  - Luis Aguilar, Mexican actor, and singer (d. 1997)
  - John Forsythe, American actor (d. 2010)
- January 31 – Millie Dunn Veasey, African-American civil rights activist (d. 2018)

=== February ===
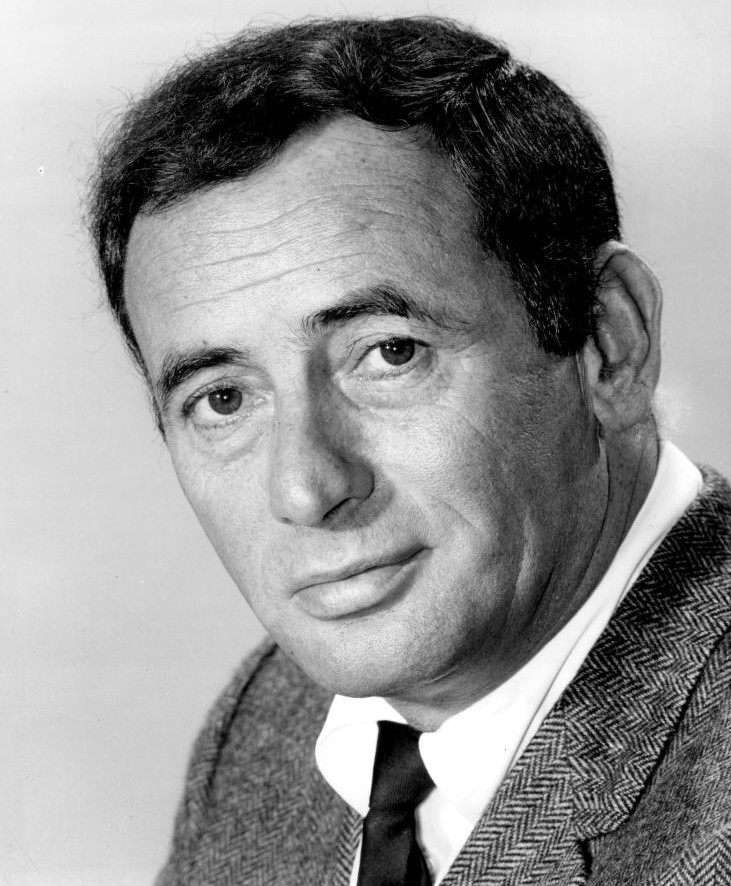
Joey Bishop

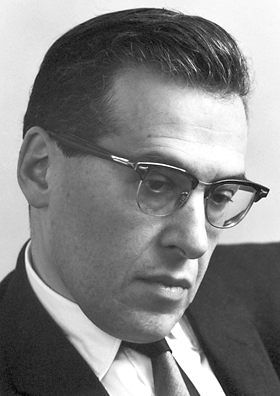
Julian Schwinger

- February 1
  - Carlos Fayt, Argentine lawyer, politician and academic (d. 2016)
  - Dame Muriel Spark, Scottish author (d. 2006)
- February 2 – Hella Haasse, Dutch writer (d. 2011)
- February 3
  - Joey Bishop, American entertainer, member of the "Rat Pack" (d. 2007)
  - Helen Stephens, American runner (d. 1994)
- February 4 – Ida Lupino, Anglo-American actress, screenwriter, director and producer (d. 1995)
- February 6 – Lothar-Günther Buchheim, German author (d. 2007)
- February 7 – Marguerite Narbel, Swiss biologist and politician (d. 2010)
- February 8 – Fred Blassie, American professional wrestler, novelty singer (Pencil Neck Geek) (d. 2003)
- February 12 – Julian Schwinger, American physicist, Nobel Prize laureate (d. 1994)
- February 14 – William L. Snyder, American film producer (d. 1998)
- February 15 – Smilja Avramov, Serbian academic, authority and educator in international law (d. 2018)
- February 19 – Fay McKenzie, American silent film actress (d. 2019)
- February 22
  - Don Pardo, American television announcer (Saturday Night Live) (d. 2014)
  - Robert Pershing Wadlow, American tallest man record-holder (d. 1940)
- February 25
  - Barney Ewell, American athlete (d. 1996)
  - Miguel Gallastegui, Spanish pelotari (d. 2019)
  - Bobby Riggs, American tennis player (d. 1995)
- February 26
  - Herbert Blaize, 6th Prime Minister of Grenada (d. 1989)
  - Lloyd Geering, New Zealand theologian (d. 2026)
  - Theodore Sturgeon, American writer (d. 1985)
- February 28 – Alfred Burke, English actor (d. 2011)

=== March ===
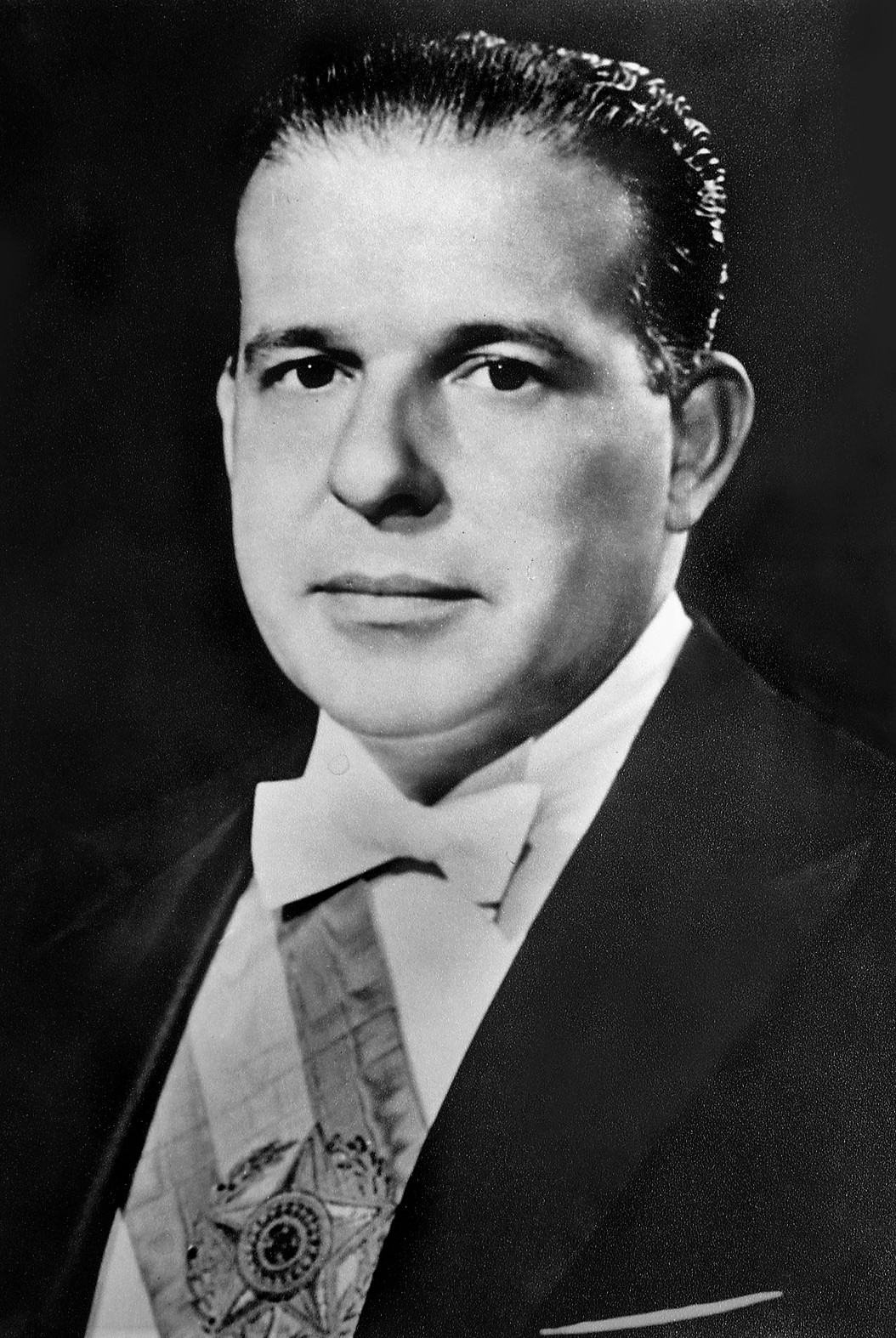
João Goulart

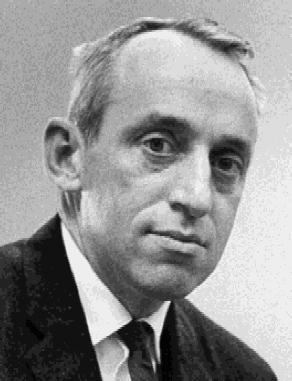
James Tobin

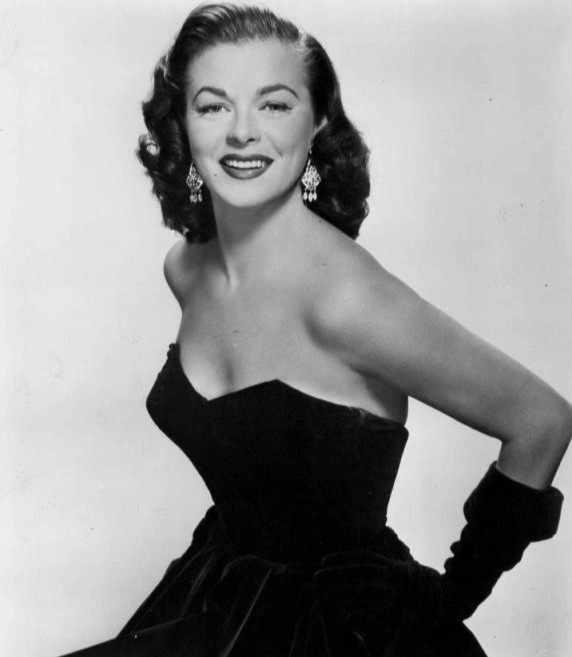
Marguerite Chapman

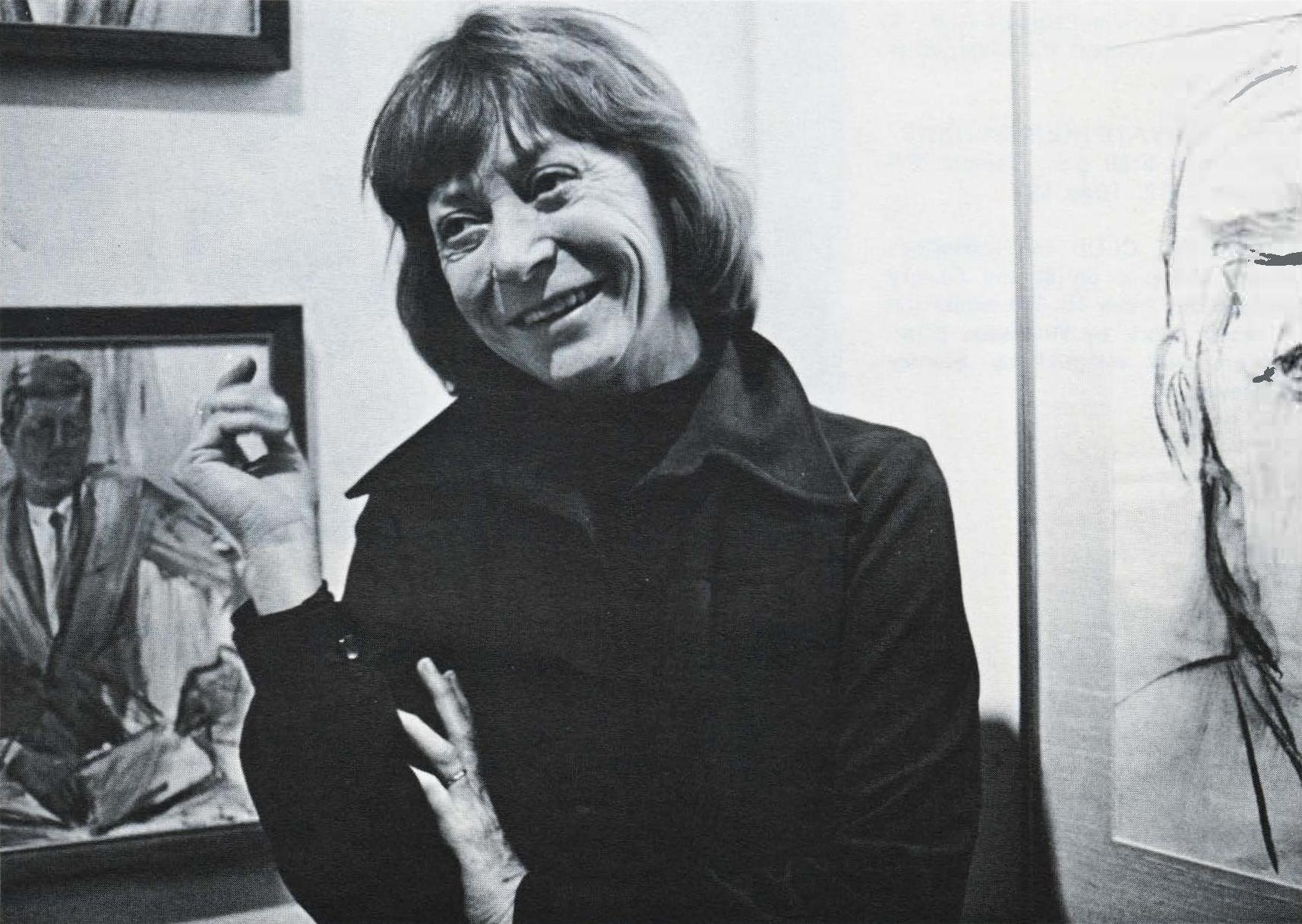
Elaine de Kooning

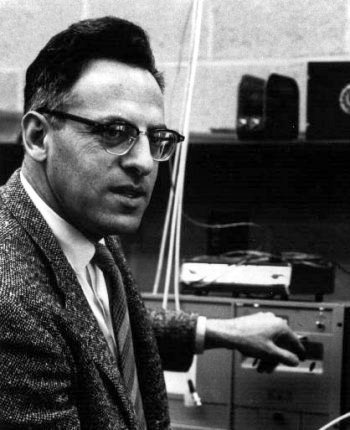
Frederick Reines

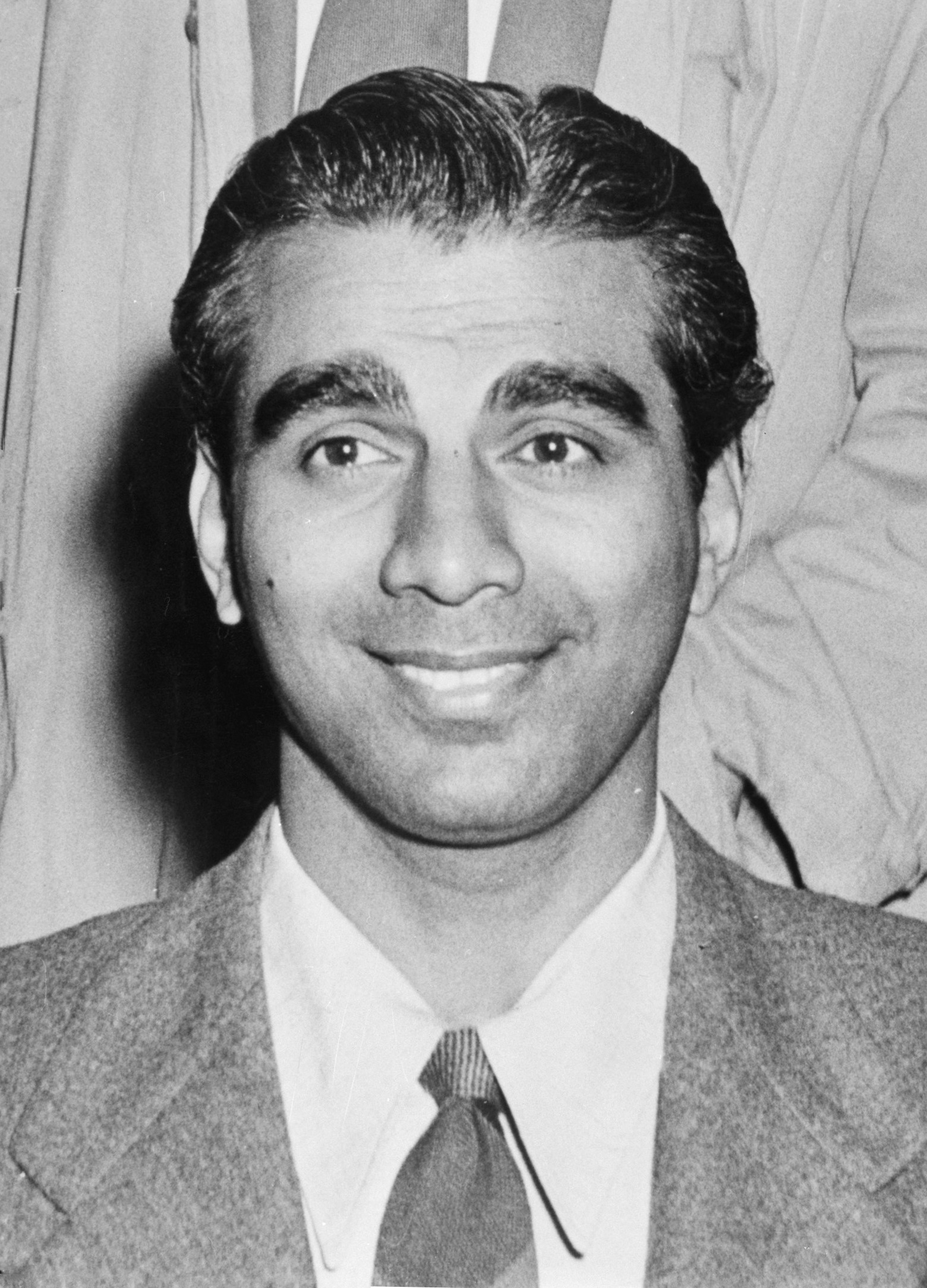
Cheddi Jagan

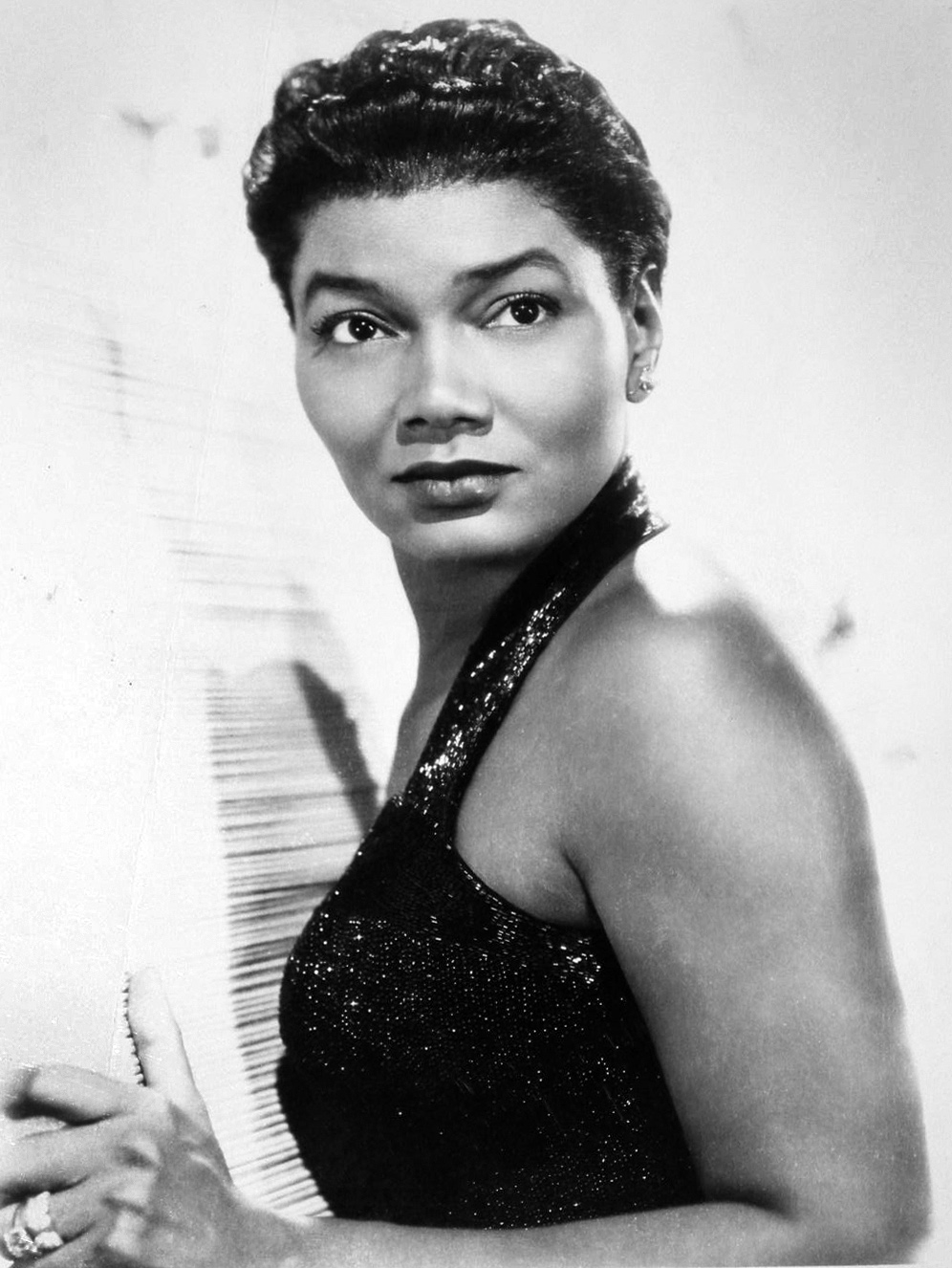
Pearl Bailey

- March 1
  - Roger Delgado, British actor (d. 1973)
  - João Goulart, 24th President of Brazil (d. 1976)
  - Duncan White, Ceylonese athlete, Olympic medallist (d. 1998)
- March 3
  - Arthur Kornberg, American biochemist, recipient of the Nobel Prize in Physiology or Medicine (d. 2007)
  - Fritz Thiedemann, German equestrian (d. 2000)
- March 4 – Margaret Osborne duPont, American female tennis player (d. 2012)
- March 5 – James Tobin, American economist, Nobel Memorial Prize laureate (d. 2002)
- March 9
  - Marguerite Chapman, American actress (d. 1999)
  - George Lincoln Rockwell, American Nazi leader (d. 1967)
  - Mickey Spillane, American writer (d. 2006)
- March 10
  - Günther Rall, German ace fighter pilot (d. 2009)
- March 12
  - Elaine de Kooning, American artist (d. 1989)
  - William E. Nichol, American politician from Nebraska (d. 2006)
- March 16 – Frederick Reines, American physicist, Nobel Prize laureate (d. 1998)
- March 17 – Viviane Gauthier, Haitian dancer (d. 2017)
- March 22 – Cheddi Jagan, 4th President of Guyana (d. 1997)
- March 23
  - Kazu Naoki, Japanese soccer player (d. 1940s)
  - Émile Derlin Zinsou, President of Benin (d. 2016)
- March 28 – Gonzalo Facio Segreda, Costa Rican lawyer, politician, and diplomat (d. 2018)
- March 29
  - Pearl Bailey, African-American singer, actress (d. 1990)
  - Sam Walton, founder of Wal-Mart (d. 1992)

=== April ===
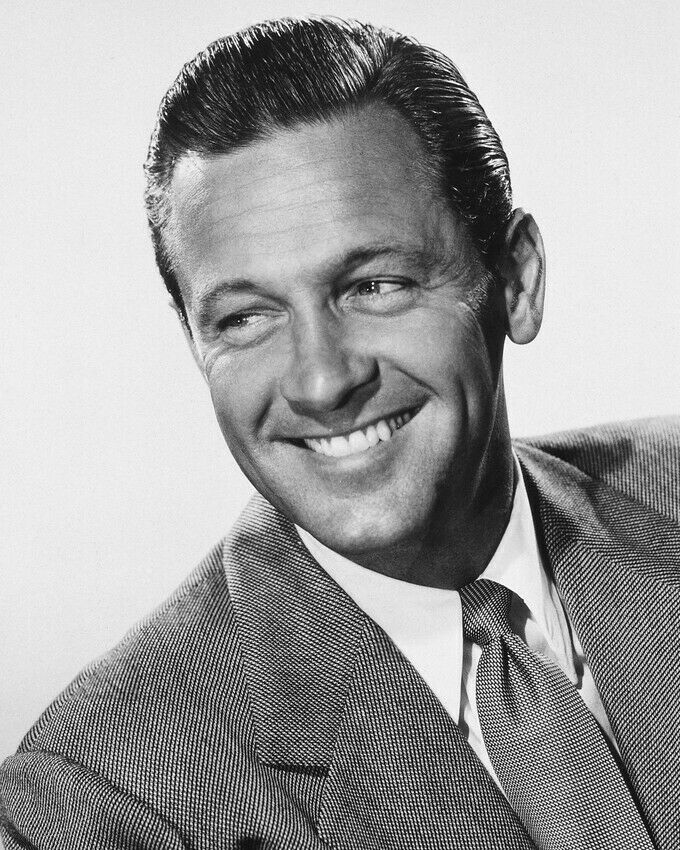
William Holden

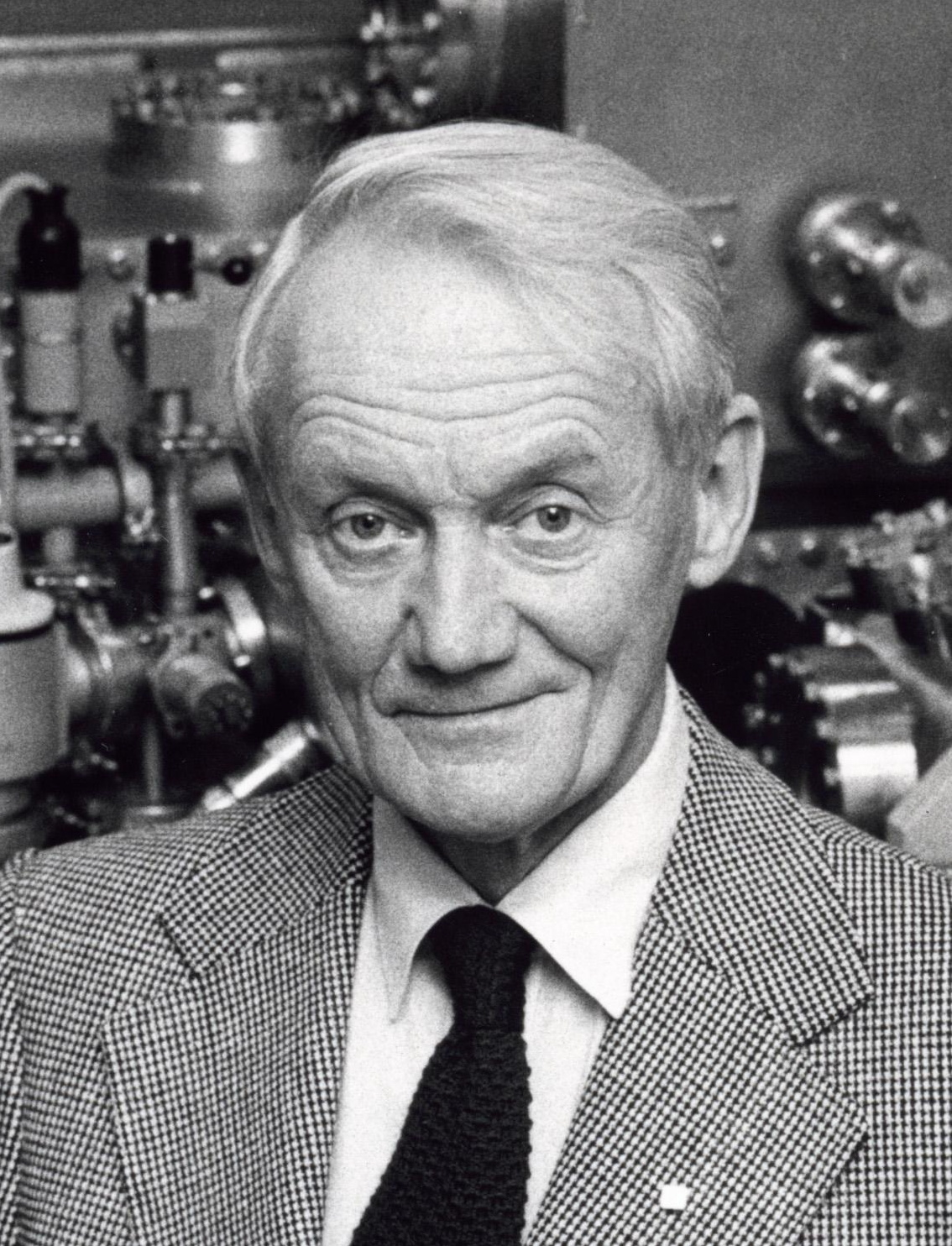
Kai Siegbahn

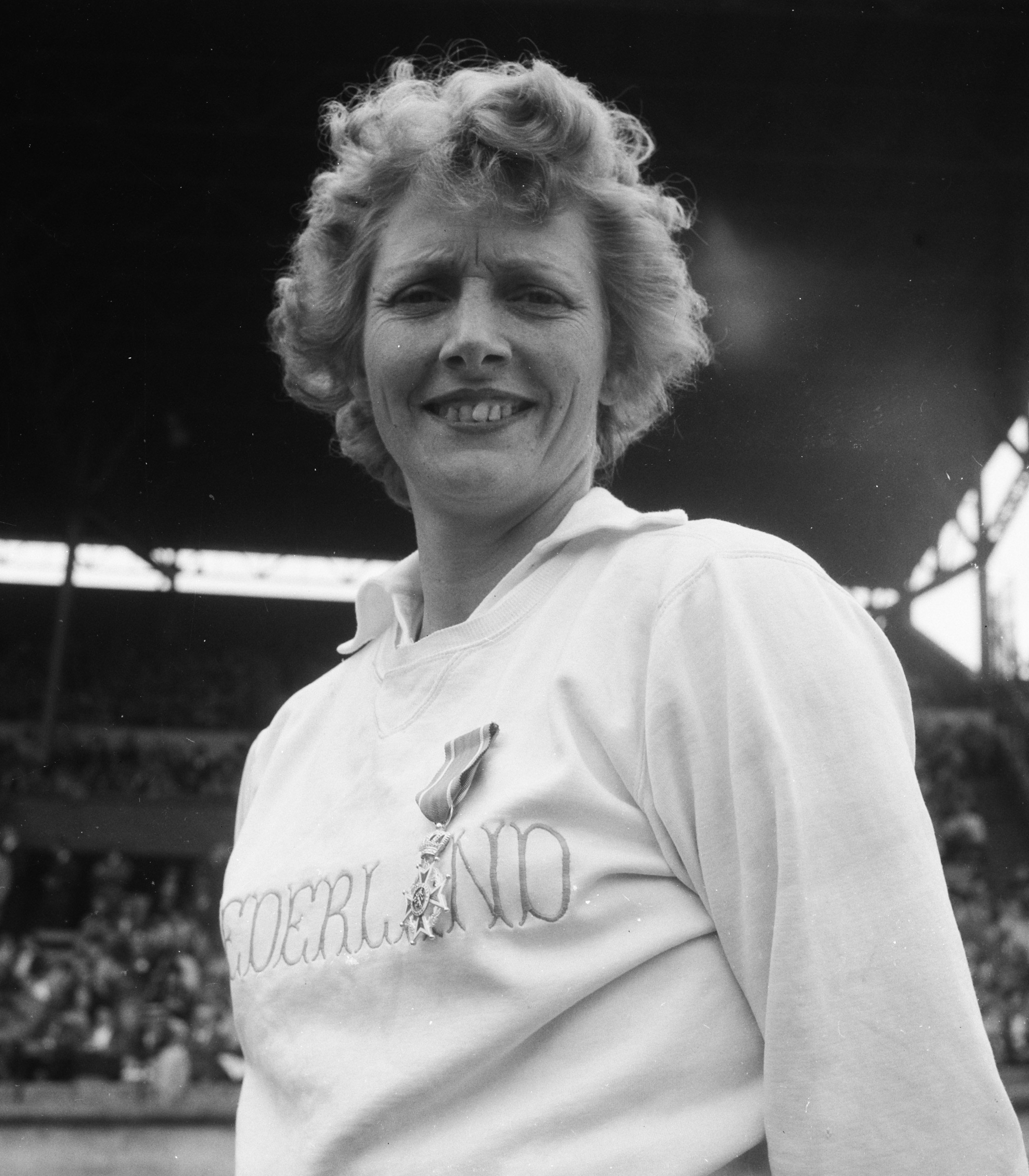
Fanny Blankers-Koen

- April 1 – Diarmuid Larkin, Irish artist and art educationist (d. 1989)
- April 6
  - Alfredo Ovando Candía, 48th President of Bolivia (d. 1982)
  - George Corones, Australian Masters swimmer (d. 2020)
- April 7 – Bobby Doerr, American baseball player (d. 2017)
- April 8 – Betty Ford, First Lady of the United States (d. 2011)
- April 9 – Jørn Utzon, Danish architect (d. 2008)
- April 10 – H. S. Doreswamy, Indian activist, journalist (d. 2021)
- April 11 – Jean-Claude Servan-Schreiber, French journalist, politician (d. 2018)
- April 14 – Mary Healy, American actress, variety entertainer and singer (d. 2015)
- April 16 – Spike Milligan, Irish comedian (d. 2002)
- April 17
  - William Holden, American actor (d. 1981)
  - Anne Shirley, American actress (d. 1993)
- April 18
  - Gabriel Axel, Danish film director (d. 2014)
  - Shinobu Hashimoto, Japanese screenwriter (d. 2018)
- April 20 – Kai Siegbahn, Swedish physicist, Nobel Prize laureate (d. 2007)
- April 26 – Fanny Blankers-Koen, Dutch athlete (d. 2004)
- April 28
  - Karl-Eduard von Schnitzler, East German journalist, host of the television show Der schwarze Kanal (d. 2001)
  - Rodger Young, United States Army soldier, remembered in the song "The Ballad of Rodger Young" (d. 1943)
- April 29 – Nils Östensson, Swedish Olympic cross-country skier (d. 1949)

=== May ===
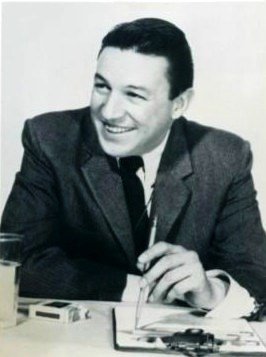
Mike Wallace

Richard Feynman

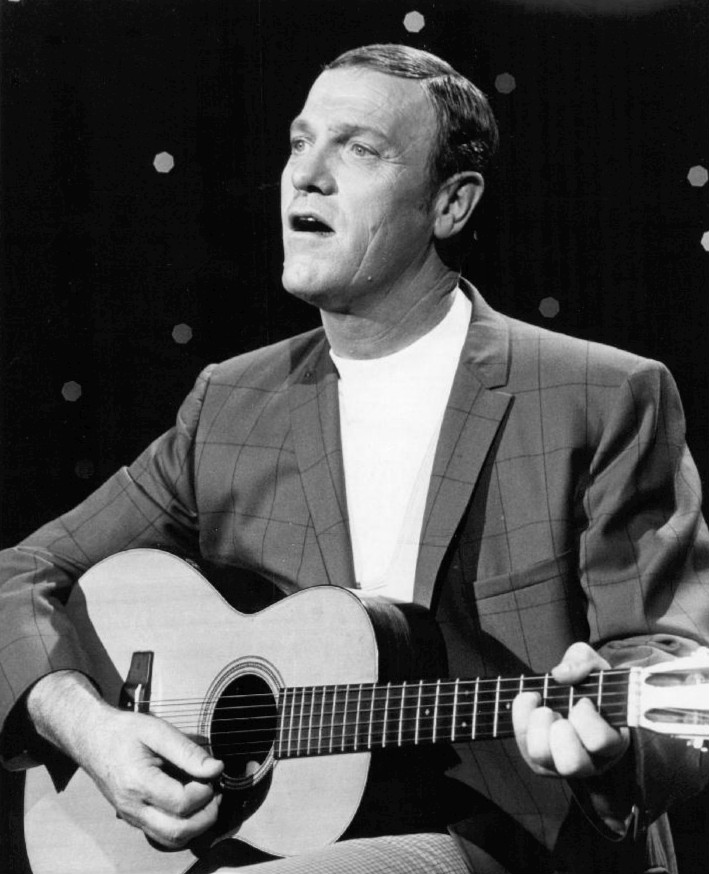
Eddy Arnold

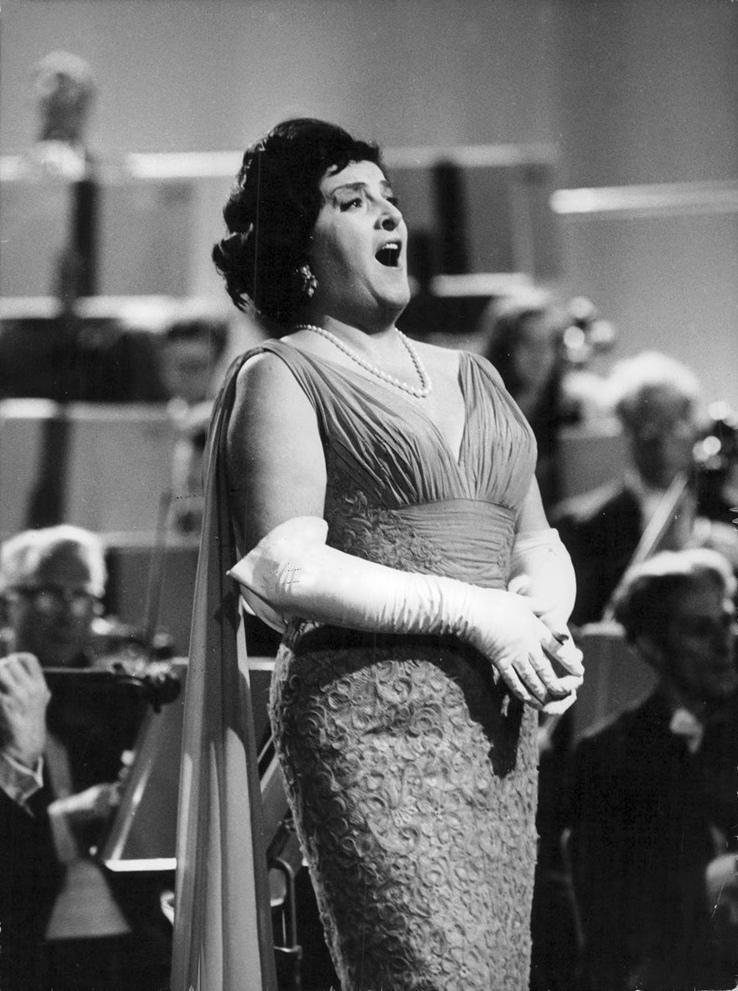
Birgit Nilsson

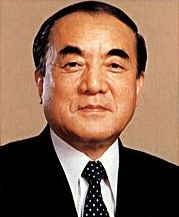
Yasuhiro Nakasone

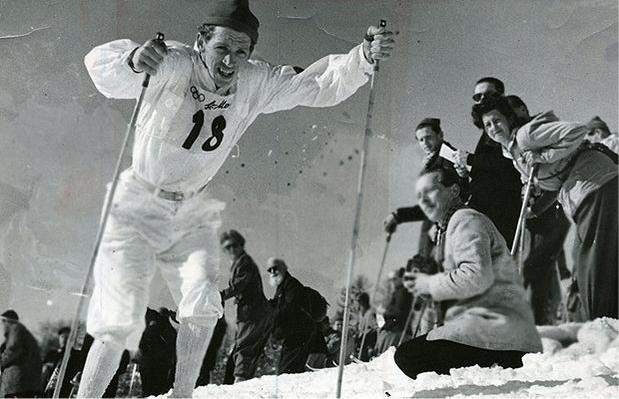
Martin Lundstrom

- May 1
  - Jack Paar, American television show host (The Tonight Show) (d. 2004)
  - Li Yaowen, Chinese politician, general and diplomat (d. 2018)
- May 4
  - Kakuei Tanaka, 40th Prime Minister of Japan (d. 1993)
  - Ana Enriqueta Terán, Venezuelan poet (d. 2017)
- May 6
  - Henrietta Boggs, Costa Rican-American author, journalist and activist (d. 2020)
  - Zayed bin Sultan Al Nahyan, 1st President of the United Arab Emirates (d. 2004)
- May 9
  - Orville Freeman, American politician (d. 2003)
  - Mike Wallace, American journalist (d. 2012)
- May 11 – Richard Feynman, American physicist, Nobel Prize laureate (d. 1988)
- May 12 – Julius Rosenberg, American-born Soviet spy (d. 1953)
- May 15
  - Eddy Arnold, American country music singer (d. 2008)
  - Joseph Wiseman, Canadian actor (d. 2009)
- May 16 – Wilf Mannion, English footballer (d. 2000)
- May 17 – Birgit Nilsson, Swedish soprano (d. 2005)
- May 19 – Abraham Pais, Dutch-born American physicist (d. 2000)
- May 20 – Edward B. Lewis, American geneticist, recipient of the Nobel Prize in Physiology or Medicine (d. 2004)
- May 23
  - Frank Mancuso, American major league baseball player, politician (d. 2007)
  - Naomi Replansky, American poet (d. 2023)
- May 27 – Yasuhiro Nakasone, 45th Prime Minister of Japan (d. 2019)
- May 28
  - Norbert Franck, Luxembourgish swimmer (d. 2006)
  - Johnny Wayne, Canadian comedian (d. 1990)
- May 30 – Martin Lundström, Swedish Olympic cross-country skier (d. 2016)
- May 31 – Margaret Todd, Canadian female golfer (d. 2019)

=== June ===
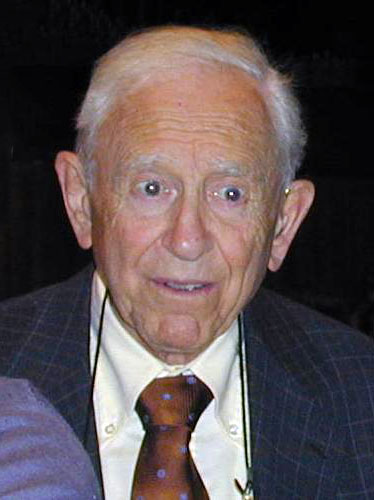
Franco Modigliani

- June 2
  - Anton Hafner, German fighter pilot (d. 1944)
  - Kathryn Tucker Windham, American writer, storyteller (d. 2011)
- June 6 – Edwin G. Krebs, American biochemist, recipient of the Nobel Prize in Physiology or Medicine (d. 2009)
- June 8 – Robert Preston, American actor (The Music Man) (d. 1987)
- June 9 – John Hospers, American philosopher (d. 2011)
- June 10 – Patachou, French singer (d. 2015)
- June 11 – Hendra Gunawan, Indonesian painter and sculptor (d. 1983)
- June 15 – François Tombalbaye, 1st President of Chad (d. 1975)
- June 17 – Ajahn Chah Subaddho, Buddhist teacher (d. 1992)
- June 18
  - Jerome Karle, American chemist, Nobel Prize laureate (d. 2013)
  - Franco Modigliani, Italian-born economist, Nobel Memorial Prize laureate (d. 2003)
  - Elisabeth Waldo, (d. 2026)
- June 22
  - Cicely Saunders, English Anglican nurse, social worker, physician and writer (d. 2005)
  - Yeoh Ghim Seng, Singaporean politician, acting President of Singapore (d. 1993)
- June 24 – Myroslav Ivan Lubachivsky, Ukrainian Catholic bishop (d. 2000)
- June 26 – Ellen Liiger, Estonian actress (d. 1987)
- June 27
  - Willy Breinholst, Danish humorist, writer (d. 2009)
  - Adolph Kiefer, American Olympic swimmer (d. 2017)

=== July ===
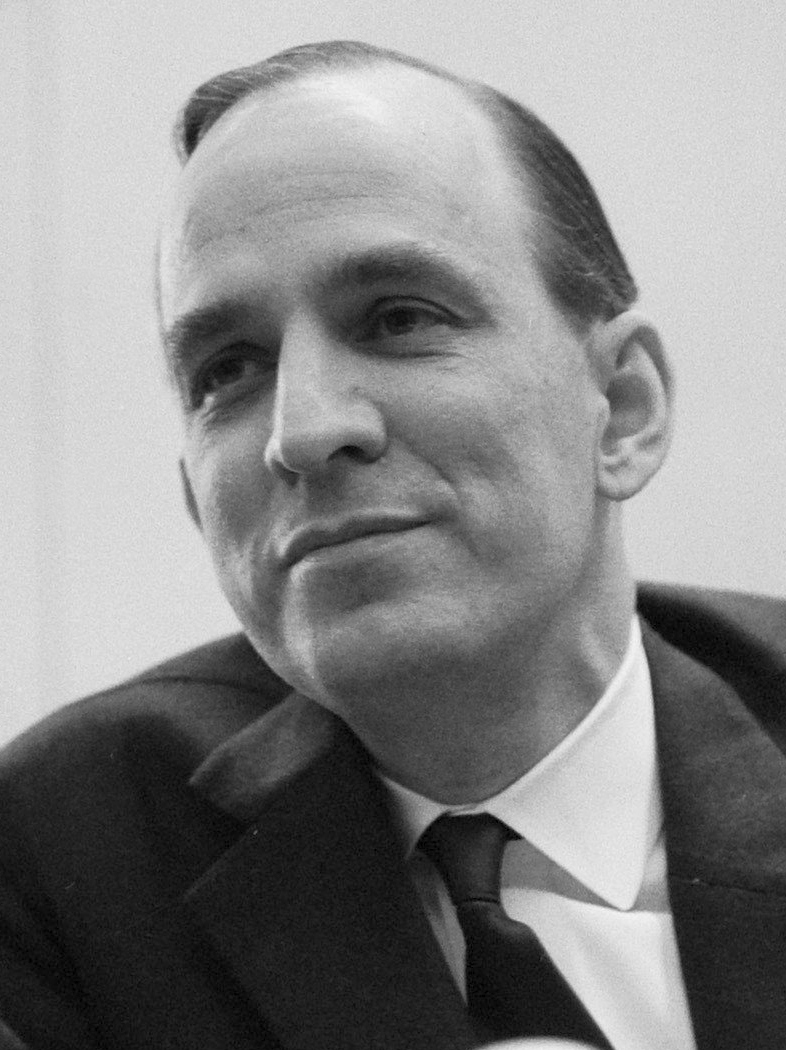
Ingmar Bergman

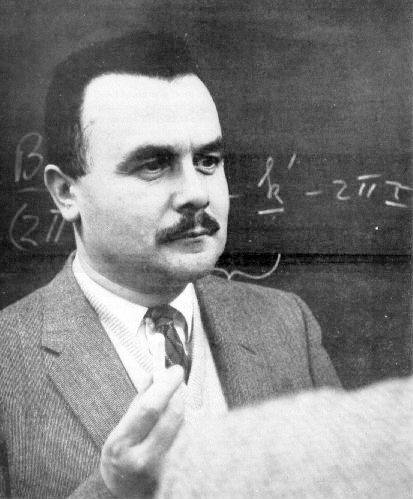
Bertram Brockhouse

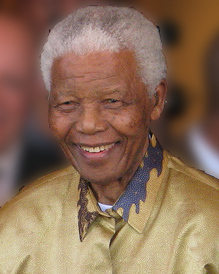
Nelson Mandela

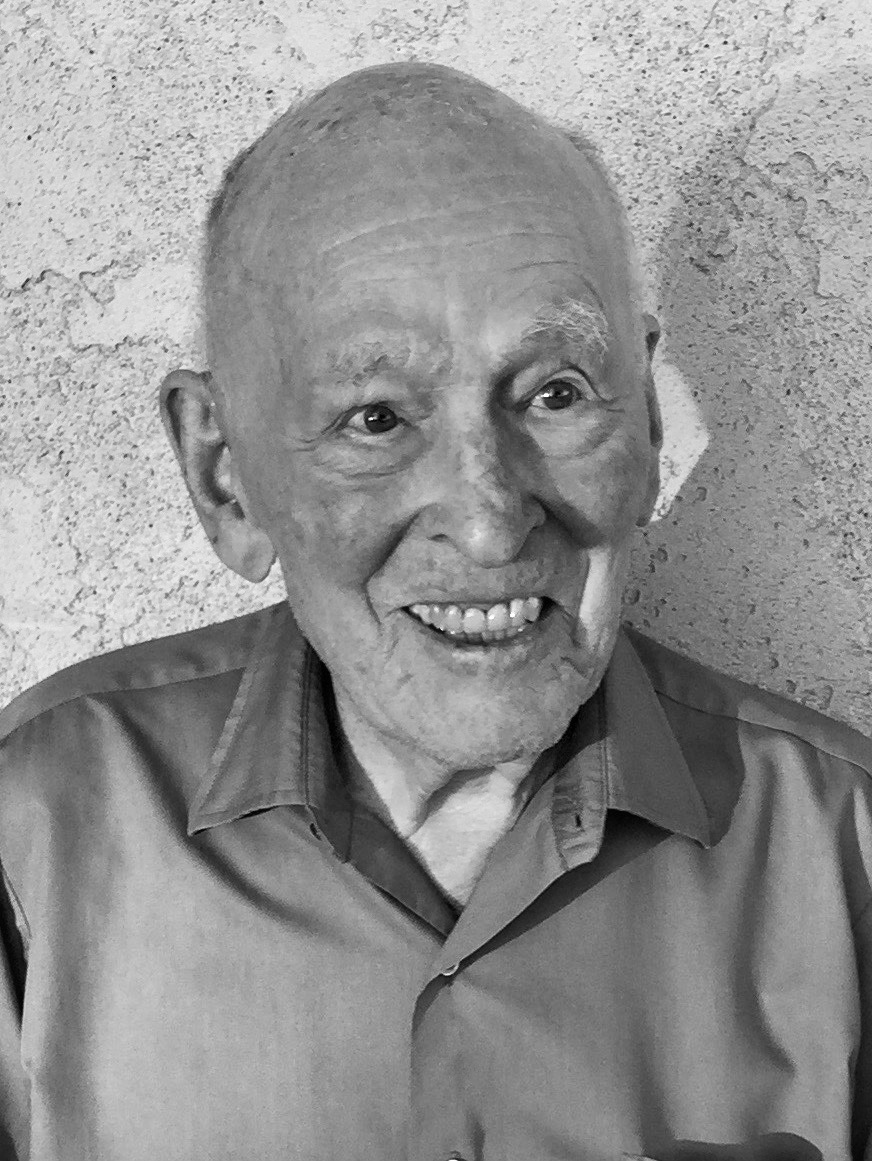
Paul D. Boyer

- July 1
  - Ahmed Deedat, South African writer, public speaker (d. 2005)
  - Pedro Yap, Filipino lawyer (d. 2003)
- July 2
  - Athos Bulcão, Brazilian painter, sculptor (d. 2008)
  - Indumati Bhattacharya, Indian politician (d. 1990)
- July 3 – Lorenzo Robledo, Spanish actor (d. 2006)
- July 4
  - King Tāufaʻāhau Tupou IV of Tonga (d. 2006)
  - Alec Bedser, English cricketer (d. 2010)
  - Eric Bedser, English cricketer (d. 2006)
- July 5
  - Zakaria Mohieddin, Egyptian general, politician (d. 2012)
  - Nikos Papatakis, Greek Ethiopian-born naturalised French filmmaker (d. 2010)
  - Miguel Ángel Sanz Bocos, Spanish fighter pilot (d. 2018)
- July 6
  - Sebastian Cabot, English actor (d. 1977)
  - Francisco Moncion, Dominican-American dancer, charter member of New York City Ballet (d. 1995)
- July 7 – Jing Shuping, Chinese businessman (d. 2009)
- July 8
  - Paul B. Fay, American businessman, soldier, and diplomat, 12th United States Secretary of the Navy (d. 2009)
  - Oluf Reed-Olsen, Norwegian resistance member, pilot (d. 2002)
- July 9 – Jarl Wahlström, Salvation Army general (d. 1999)
- July 12 – Mary Glen-Haig, British Olympic fencer (d. 2014)
- July 13
  - Alberto Ascari, Italian racing driver (d. 1955)
  - Ted Oldfield, English footballer (d. 2006)
- July 14
  - T. M. Aluko, Nigerian writer (d. 2010)
  - Ingmar Bergman, Swedish film director (d. 2007)
  - Jay Wright Forrester, American computer scientist (d. 2016)
- July 15
  - Paddy Bassett, New Zealand scientist (d. 2019)
  - Bertram Brockhouse, Canadian physicist, Nobel Prize laureate (d. 2003)
  - Brenda Milner, Canadian neuropsychologist
- July 16
  - Bayani Casimiro, Filipino dancer and actor (d. 1989)
  - Pituka de Foronda, Spanish actress (d. 1999)
- July 17 – Carlos Manuel Arana Osorio, 35th President of Guatemala (d. 2003)
- July 18
  - Lia Dorana, Dutch comedian, actress (d. 2010)
  - Nelson Mandela, 1st President of South Africa and recipient of the Nobel Peace Prize (d. 2013)
- July 20 – Auður Laxness, Icelandic writer, craftsperson (d. 2012)
- July 21 – Elsa Kobberstad, Norwegian schoolteacher, politician (d. 2007)
- July 22 – Lila Zali, Georgian-born American prima ballerina (d. 2003)
- July 24
  - Antonio Candido, Brazilian literary critic, sociologist (d. 2017)
  - Ruggiero Ricci, Italian-born violinist (d. 2012)
- July 27 – Leonard Rose, American cellist (d. 1984)
- July 28 – Penaia Ganilau, 1st President of Fiji (d. 1993)
- July 29 – Edwin O'Connor, American novelist, Pulitzer Prize for Fiction winner (d. 1968)
- July 31
  - Vicente Almeida d'Eça, Portuguese colonial administrator (d. 2018)
  - Paul D. Boyer, American chemist, Nobel Prize laureate (d. 2018)
  - Hank Jones, American pianist (d. 2010)

=== August ===
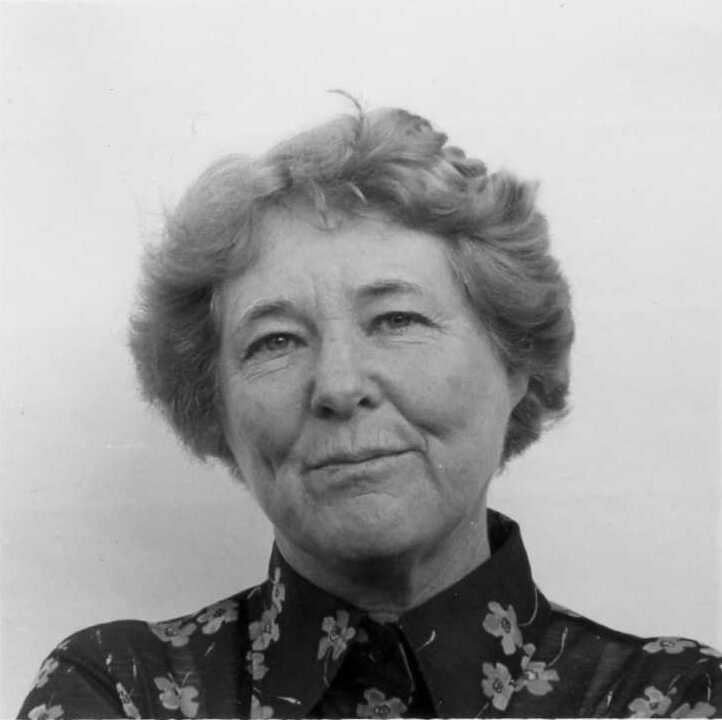
Bruria Kaufman

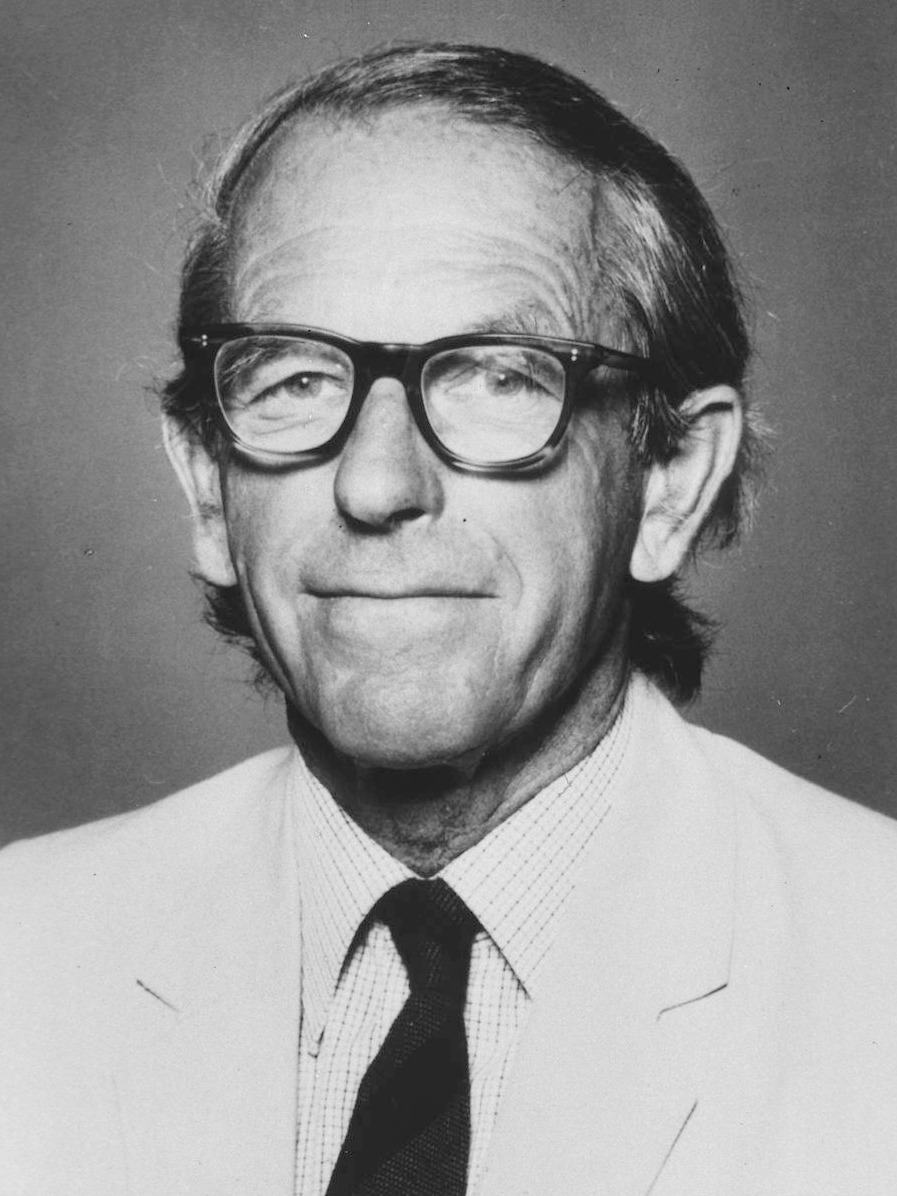
Frederick Sanger

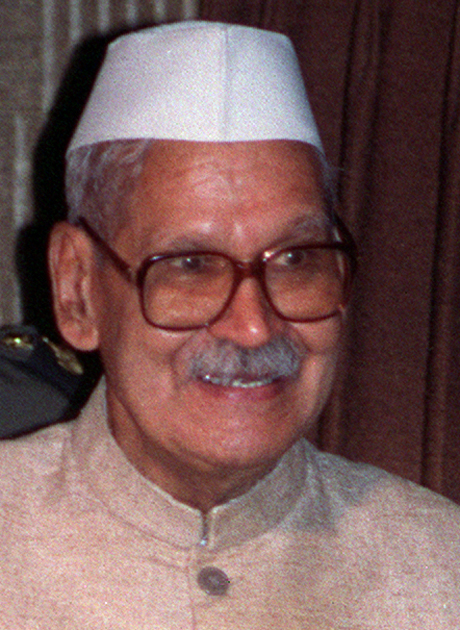
Shankar Dayal Sharma

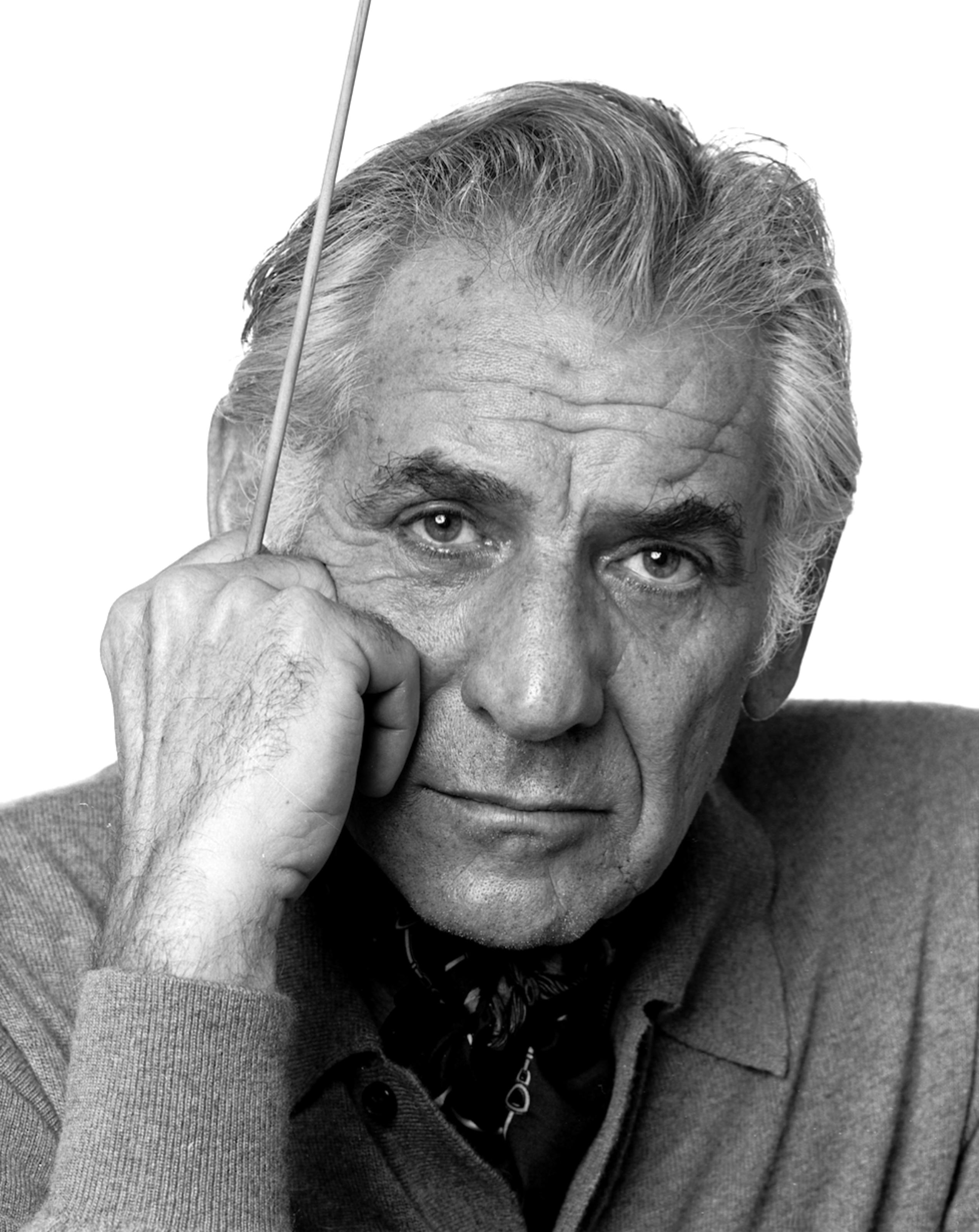
Leonard Bernstein

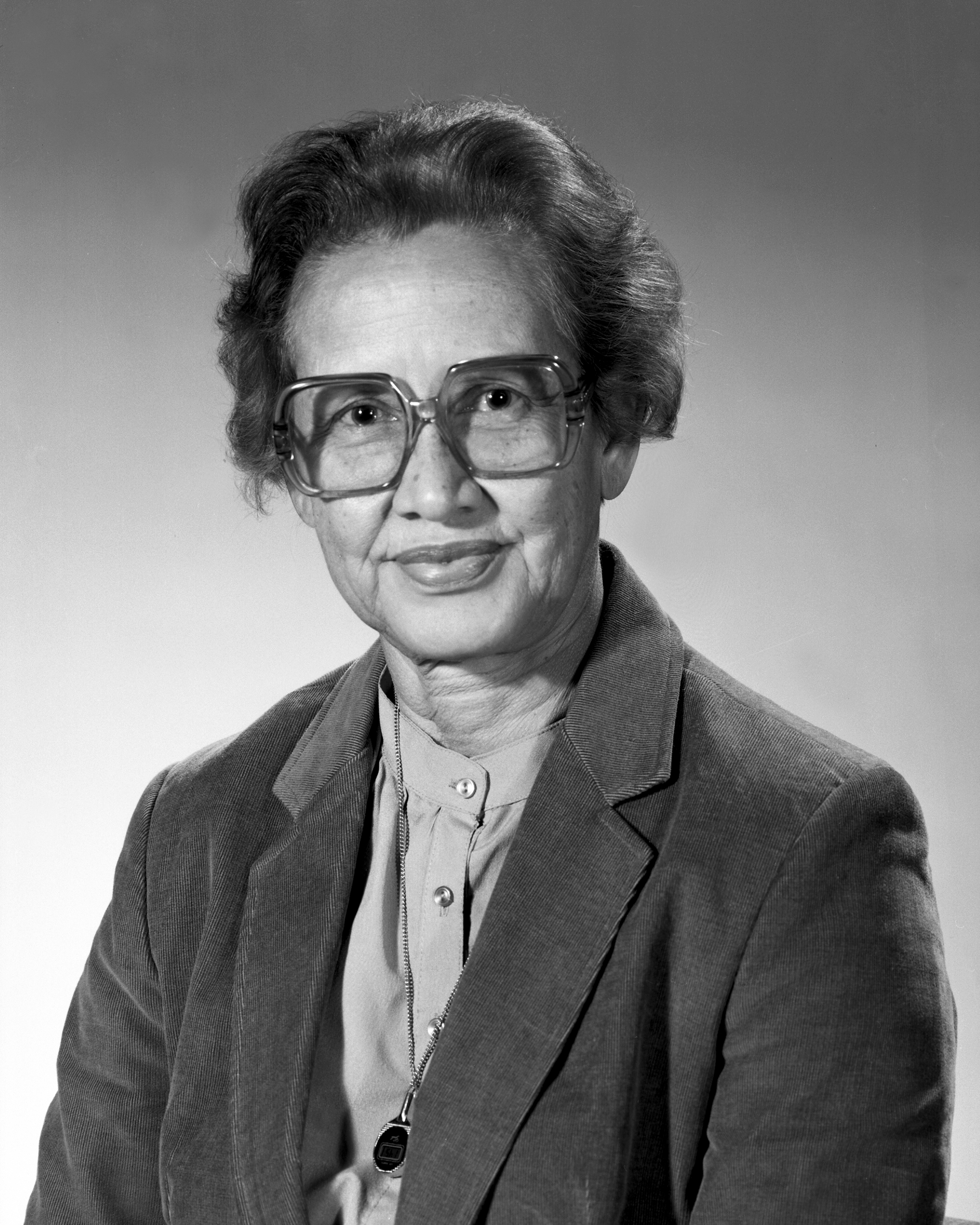
Katherine Johnson

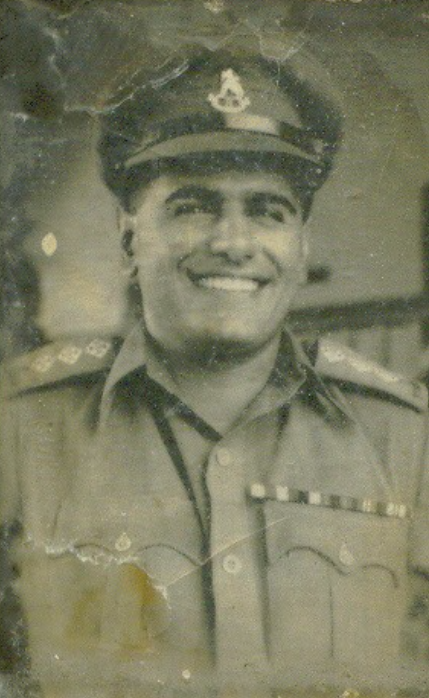
Aslam Khan

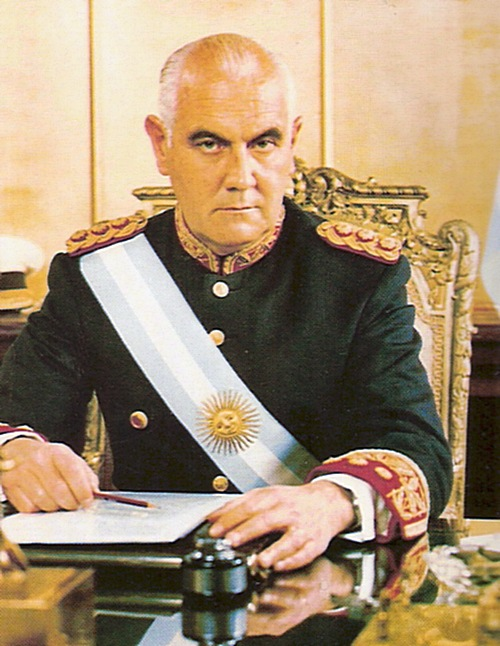
Alejandro Agustín Lanusse

- August 1
  - Artur Brauner, German film producer and entrepreneur (d. 2019)
  - Zhou Xuan, Chinese singer, actress (d. 1957)
- August 2 – Dada Vaswani, Indian spiritual leader (d. 2018)
- August 3 – Cheng Kaijia, Chinese nuclear physicist and engineer (d. 2018)
- August 4 – Noel Willman, Irish actor (d. 1988)
- August 5
  - Kondapalli Koteswaramma, Indian communist leader, feminist, revolutionary and writer (d. 2018)
  - Betty Oliphant, co-founder of National Ballet of Canada (d. 2004)
- August 12 – Guy Gibson, British bomber pilot, leader of the "Dam Busters" raid (d. 1944)
- August 13
  - Noor Hassanali, 2nd President of Trinidad and Tobago (d. 2006)
  - Frederick Sanger, English biochemist, double Nobel Prize laureate (d. 2013)
- August 19 – Shankar Dayal Sharma, 9th President of India (d. 1999)
- August 20 – Crystal Bennett, British archaeologist, pioneering researcher on Jordan (d. 1987)
- August 21 – Bruria Kaufman, American-born Israeli physicist (d. 2010)
- August 22
  - Said Mohamed Djohar, President of the Comoros (d. 2006)
  - Martin Pope, American physical chemist (d. 2022)
- August 23 – Bernard Fisher, American surgeon (d. 2019)
- August 25 – Leonard Bernstein, American composer, conductor (d. 1990)
- August 26
  - Katherine Johnson, African-American physicist, space scientist and mathematician (d. 2020)
  - Maria Isaura Pereira de Queiróz, Brazilian sociologist (d. 2018)
- August 27
  - Aslam Khan, British Indian-born military officer, led his troops during World War II in capturing Kennedy Peak (Myanmar), which the Americans had failed to conquer. For this achievement, he was awarded the Military Cross by Field Marshal Auchinleck (d. 1994)
  - Chang Yun Chung, Chinese-born billionaire shipping magnate (d. 2020)
  - Jelle Zijlstra, Dutch politician, Prime Minister of the Netherlands from 1966 to 1967 (d. 2001)
- August 28 – Alejandro Agustín Lanusse, 37th President of Argentina (d. 1996)
- August 29 – Clemens C. J. Roothaan, Dutch physicist (d. 2019)
- August 30 – Ted Williams, American baseball player (d. 2002)
- August 31 – Alan Jay Lerner, American lyricist, librettist (d. 1986)

=== September ===
Chaim Herzog

- September 1 – Phyllis Wallbank, English educationalist (d. 2020)
- September 3 – Helen Wagner, American soap opera actress (d. 2010)
- September 4 – Gerald Wilson, American jazz trumpeter (d. 2014)
- September 6 – Ludwig Hörmann, German cyclist (d. 2001)
- September 8 – Derek Barton, British chemist, Nobel Prize laureate (d. 1998)
- September 9 – Oscar Luigi Scalfaro, 9th President of Italy (d. 2012)
- September 13 – Ray Charles, American musician, singer and songwriter (d. 2015)
- September 14 – James George, Canadian diplomat (d. 2020)
- September 15 – Nipsey Russell, American comedian, poet, and dancer (d. 2005)
- September 16 – Ismail Mohamed Ali, Malaysian politician (d. 1998)
- September 17 – Chaim Herzog, 6th President of Israel 1983–1993 (d. 1997)
- September 19 – Joseph Zeller, American politician (d. 2018)
- September 22 – Henryk Szeryng, Polish-born violinist (d. 1988)
- September 24 – Emerante Morse, Haitian singer, dancer and folklorist (d. 2018)
- September 26 – Peng Chang-kuei, Taiwanese chef (d. 2016)
- September 27 – Martin Ryle, English radio astronomer, recipient of the Nobel Prize in Physics (d. 1984)
- September 28
  - Ángel Labruna, Argentine soccer player, manager (d. 1983)
  - Ida Schuster, Scottish actress (d. 2020)
  - Arnold Stang, American comic actor (d. 2009)
- September 30
  - Giovanni Canestri, Italian cardinal (d. 2015)
  - Aldo Parisot, Brazilian-American cellist and educator (d. 2018)

=== October ===
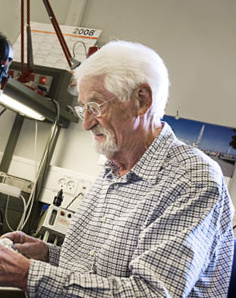
Jens Christian Skou

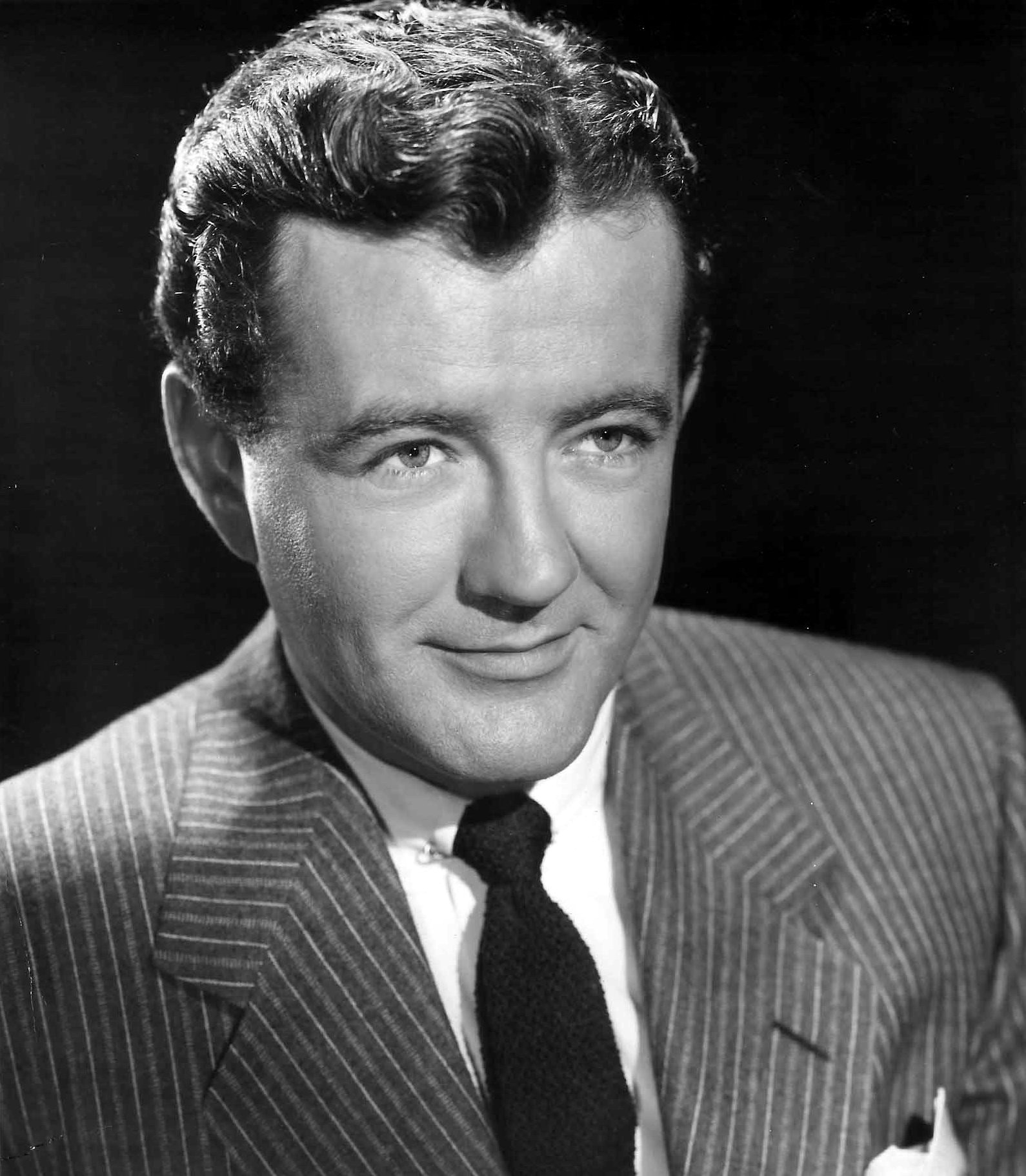
Robert Walker

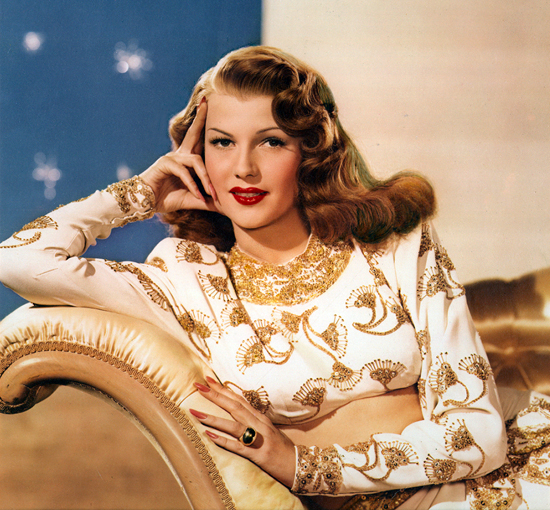
Rita Hayworth

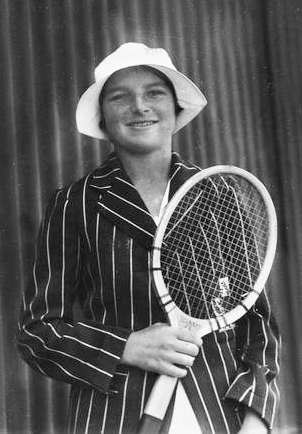
Thelma Coyne Long

- October 4 – Kenichi Fukui, Japanese chemist, Nobel Prize laureate (d. 1998)
- October 6 – Goh Keng Swee, former Deputy Prime Minister of Singapore (d. 2010)
- October 8 – Jens Christian Skou, Danish chemist, Nobel Prize laureate (d. 2018)
- October 9
  - E. Howard Hunt, American Watergate break-in coordinator (d. 2007)
  - Bebo Valdés, Cuban pianist, bandleader, composer and arranger (d. 2013)
- October 10 – Gaston Mialaret, French pedagogist and professor (d. 2016)
- October 13
  - Jack MacGowran, Irish film actor (d. 1973)
  - Robert Walker, American actor (d. 1951)
- October 14 – Thelma Coyne Long, Australian tennis player (d. 2015)
- October 16
  - Louis Althusser, French philosopher (d. 1990)
  - Géori Boué, French operatic singer (d. 2017)
  - Henri Vernes, Belgian author (d. 2021)
- October 17 – Rita Hayworth, American actress (d. 1987)
- October 18
  - Konstantinos Mitsotakis, former Greek Prime Minister (d. 2017)
  - Bobby Troup, American singer-songwriter and actor, known for his role in Emergency! (d. 1999)
- October 19 – Robert S. Strauss, American politician, Democratic National Committee Chairman (d. 2014)
- October 22 – René de Obaldia, French playwright and poet (d. 2022)
- October 23 – Augusta Dabney, American actress (d. 2008)
- October 25
  - Francisco Griéguez, Spanish WWII soldier (d. 2018)
  - Milton Selzer, American actor (d. 2006)
- October 26 – Marc Hodler, Swiss lawyer (d. 2006)
- October 27
  - Mihkel Mathiesen, Estonian statesman (d. 2003)
  - Teresa Wright, American actress (d. 2005)
- October 29 – Diana Serra Cary, American actress (d. 2020)
- October 31 – Ian Stevenson, American parapsychologist (d. 2007)

=== November ===
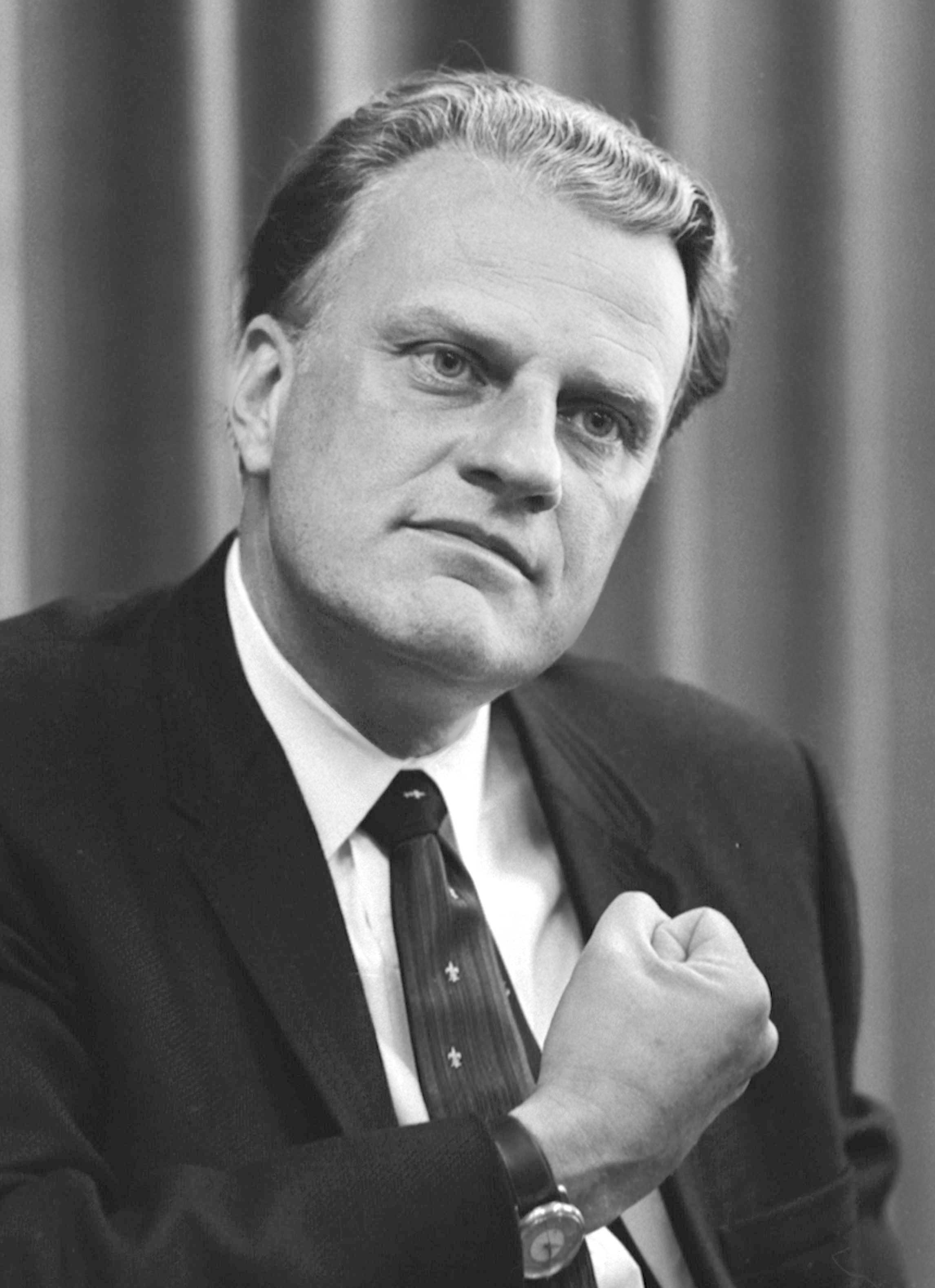
Billy Graham

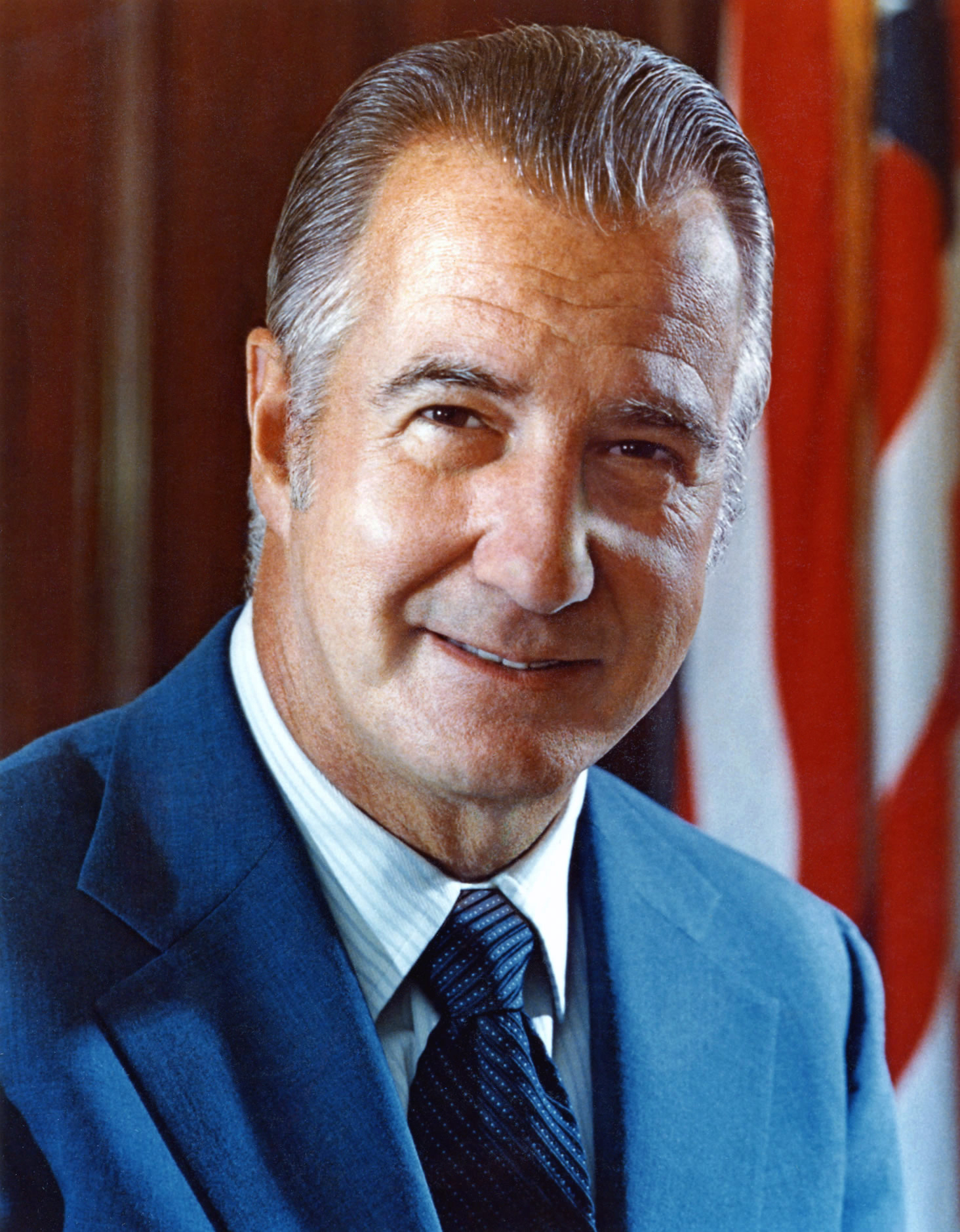
Spiro Agnew

- November 1 – Ken Miles, British sports car racing engineer and driver (d. 1966)
- November 2
  - Raimon Panikkar, Spanish theologian (d. 2010)
  - Ivor Wynne, Canadian educator and university administrator (d. 1970)
- November 3 – Russell B. Long, United States Senator from Louisiana (d. 2003)
- November 4
  - Art Carney, American actor, best known for his role in The Honeymooners (d. 2003)
  - Cameron Mitchell, American actor (d. 1994)
- November 7
  - Paul Aussaresses, French general (d. 2013)
  - Billy Graham, American evangelist, spiritual adviser to several U.S. Presidents (d. 2018)
- November 8
  - Teoh Seng Khoon, Malaysian badminton player (d. 2018)
  - Hermann Zapf, German typeface designer (d. 2015)
- November 9
  - Spiro Agnew, Vice president of the United States (d. 1996)
  - Choi Hong Hi, South Korean general, martial artist (d. 2002)
  - Su Beng, Taiwanese dissident and political activist (d. 2019)
- November 10 – Ernst Otto Fischer, German chemist, Nobel Prize laureate (d. 2007)
- November 14 – John Bromwich, Australian tennis player (d. 1999)
- November 15 – Vittore Bocchetta, Italian sculptor, painter and academic (d. 2021)
- November 18 – Nicolás Kingman Riofrío, Ecuadorian journalist, writer and politician (d. 2018)
- November 26 – Patricio Aylwin, 32nd President of Chile (d. 2016)
- November 27 – Borys Paton, Ukrainian scientist (d. 2020)
- November 29 – Madeleine L'Engle, American author (d. 2007)
- November 30 – Efrem Zimbalist Jr., American actor (d. 2014)

=== December ===
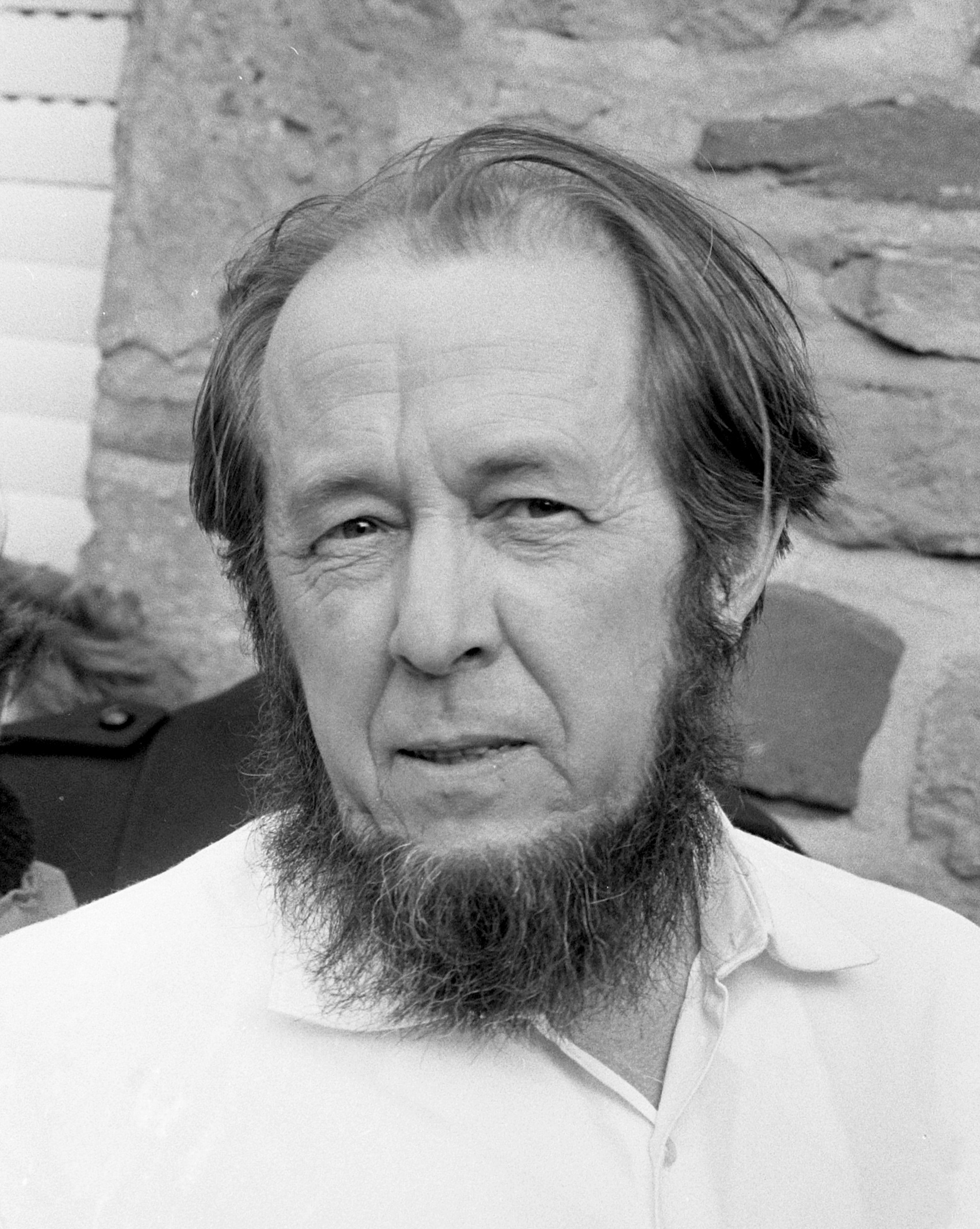
Aleksandr Solzhenitsyn

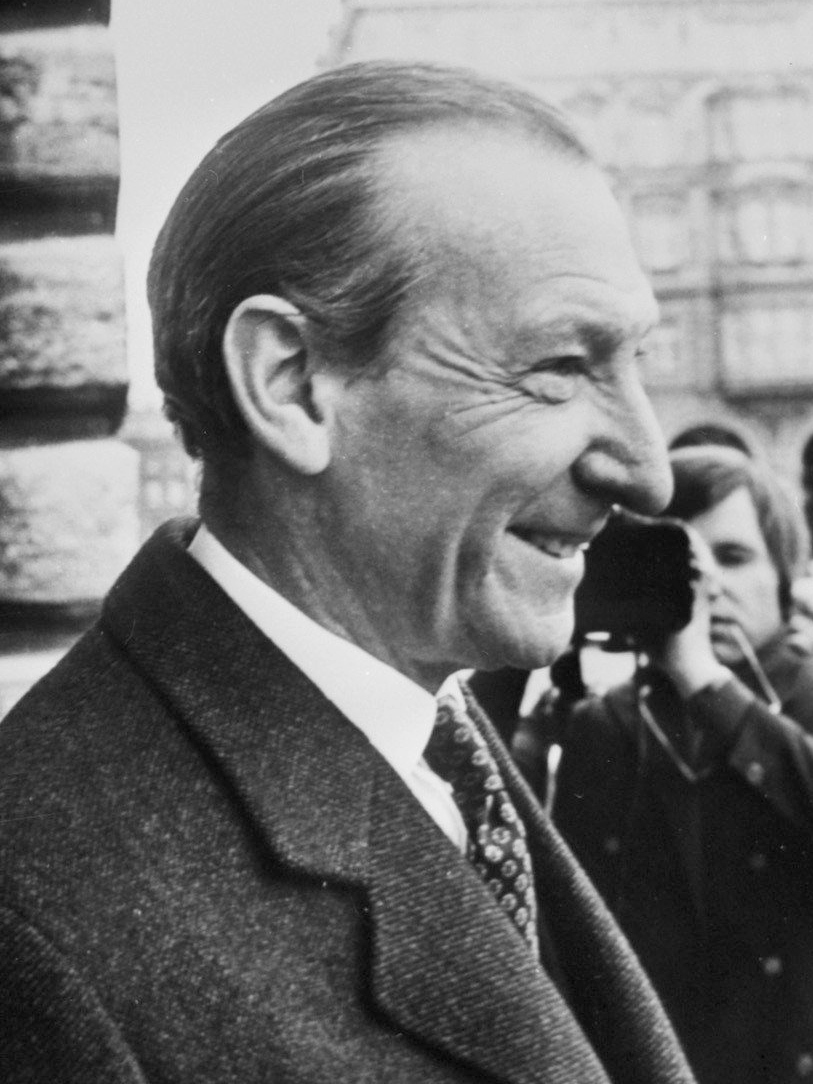
Kurt Waldheim

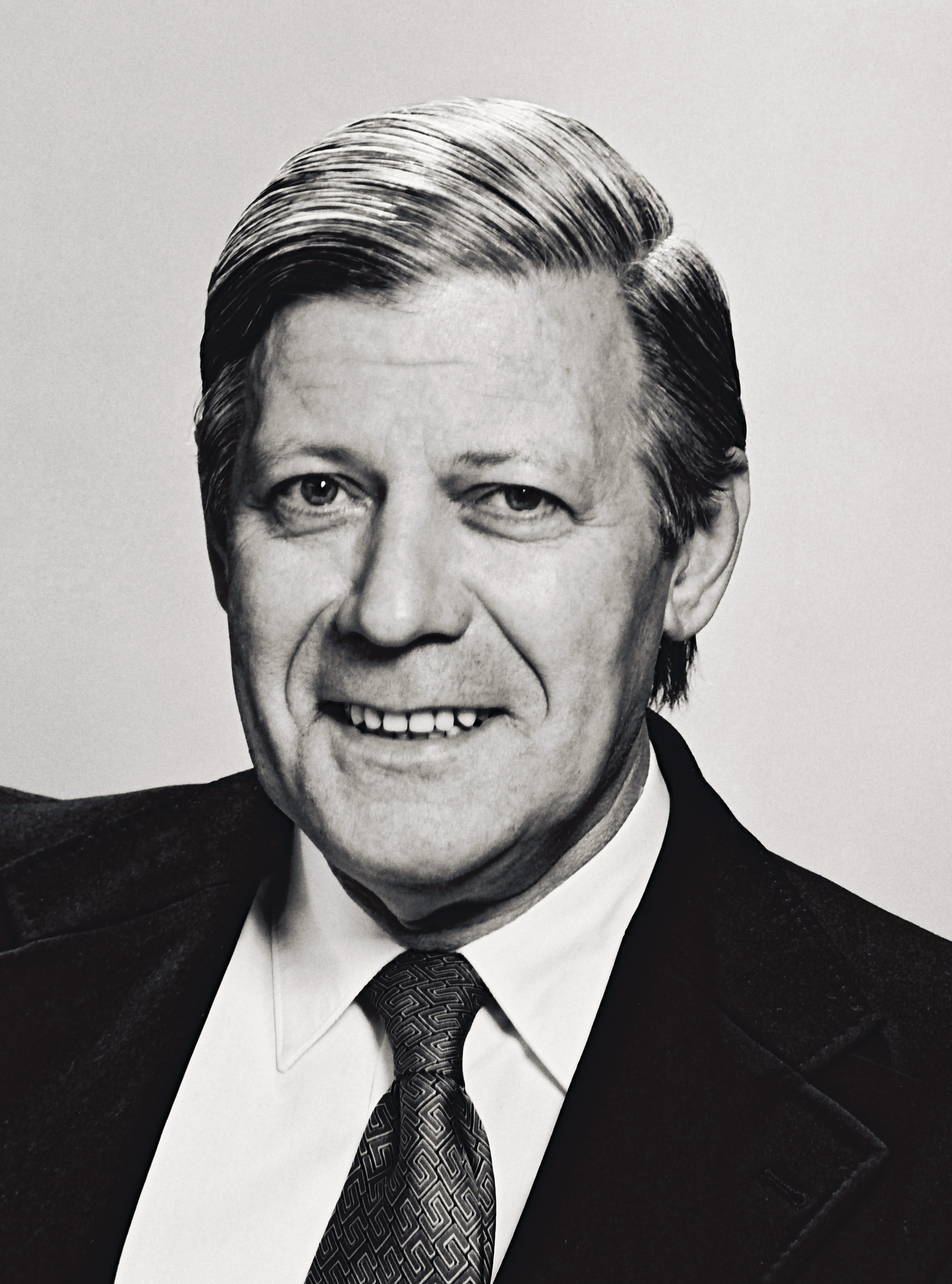
Helmut Schmidt

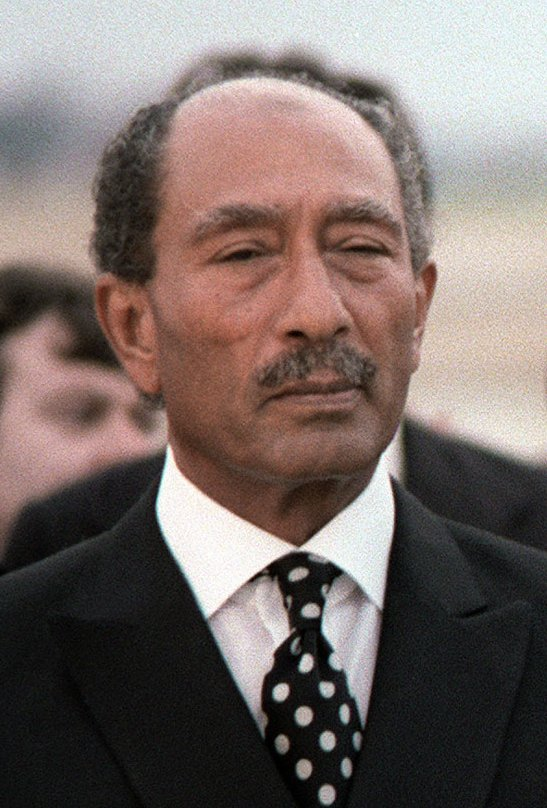
Anwar Sadat

- December 3 – Abdul Haris Nasution, Indonesian general (d. 2000)
- December 7
  - Jórunn Viðar, Icelandic pianist, composer (d. 2017)
  - Liu Yichang, Hong Kong writer and novelist (d. 2018)
- December 8 – Gérard Souzay, French baritone (d. 2004)
- December 10 – Anatoly Tarasov, Russian ice-hockey player and coach (d. 1995)
  - Fergus Anckorn
- December 11 – Aleksandr Solzhenitsyn, Russian writer, Nobel Prize laureate (d. 2008)
- December 12 – Joe Williams, American jazz singer (d. 1999)
- December 13 – Rosalia Lombardo, Italian child known as The Sleeping Beauty (d. 1920)
- December 14 – B. K. S. Iyengar, Indian yoga teacher (d. 2014)
- December 15 – Jeff Chandler, American actor (d. 1961)
- December 17
  - Dusty Anderson, American actress and model (d. 2007)
  - Duchess Woizlawa Feodora of Mecklenburg, German royal (d. 2019)
- December 18 – Joyce Reynolds, English classicist and academic (d. 2022)
- December 19 – Tadeusz Hogendorf, Polish footballer (d. 2010)
- December 21
  - Francisco Miró Quesada Cantuarias, Peruvian philosopher (d. 2019)
  - Fred Gloden, American football player (d. 2019)
  - Donald Regan, American Treasury Secretary, White House Chief of Staff (d. 2003)
  - Kurt Waldheim, President of Austria, Secretary-General of the United Nations (d. 2007)
- December 23
  - José Greco, Italian-born flamenco dancer (d. 2000)
  - Kumar Pallana, Indian actor (d. 2013)
  - Helmut Schmidt, Chancellor of Germany (d. 2015)
- December 24 – Dave Bartholomew, American musician, songwriter and music producer (d. 2019)
- December 25
  - Bertie Mee, English football player, manager (d. 2001)
  - Anwar Sadat, 3rd President of Egypt, recipient of the Nobel Peace Prize (d. 1981)
- December 26 – Georgios Rallis, Prime Minister of Greece (d. 2006)
- December 30 – W. Eugene Smith, American photojournalist (d. 1978)

== Deaths ==
=== January ===
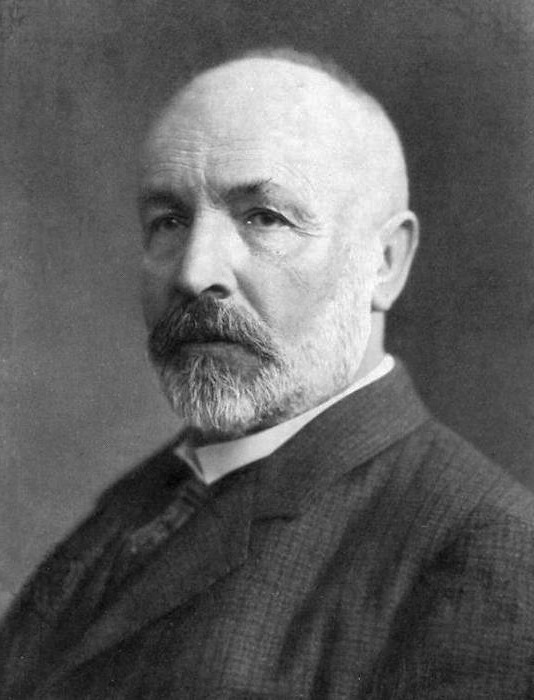
Georg Cantor

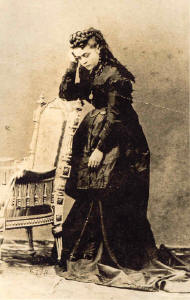
María Dolores Rodríguez Sopeña

- January 2 – Katharine A. O'Keeffe O'Mahoney, Irish-born American teacher and writer (b. 1855)
- January 6 – Georg Cantor, German mathematician (b. 1845)
- January 8
  - Johannes Pääsuke, Estonian photographer, filmmaker (b. 1892)
  - Ellis H. Roberts, American politician (b. 1827)
- January 9
  - Max Ritter von Müller, German World War I fighter ace (killed in action) (b. 1887)
  - Charles-Émile Reynaud, French inventor (b. 1844)
- January 10 – María Dolores Rodríguez Sopeña, Spanish Roman Catholic religious sister and Blessed (b. 1848)
- January 21 – Emil Jellinek, German automobile entrepreneur (b. 1853)
- January 26 – Grand Duke Nicholas Konstantinovich of Russia (b. 1850)
- January 28 – John McCrae, Canadian soldier, surgeon and poet (b. 1872)
- January 31 – Ivan Puluj, Ukrainian physicist and inventor (b. 1845)

=== February ===
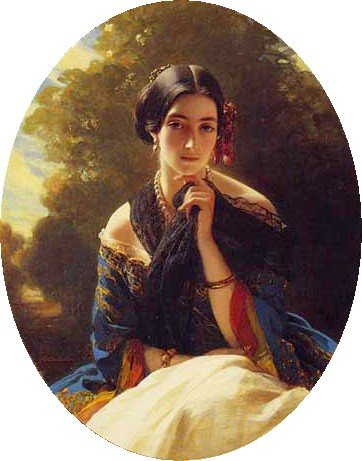
Princess Leonilla Bariatinskaya

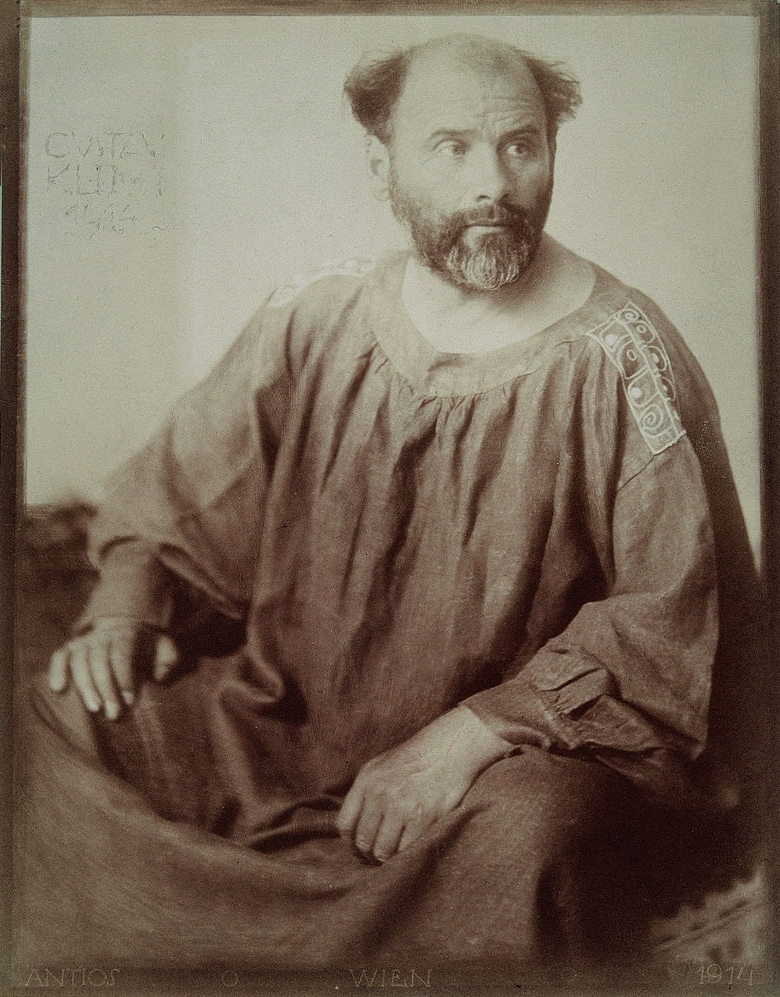
Gustav Klimt

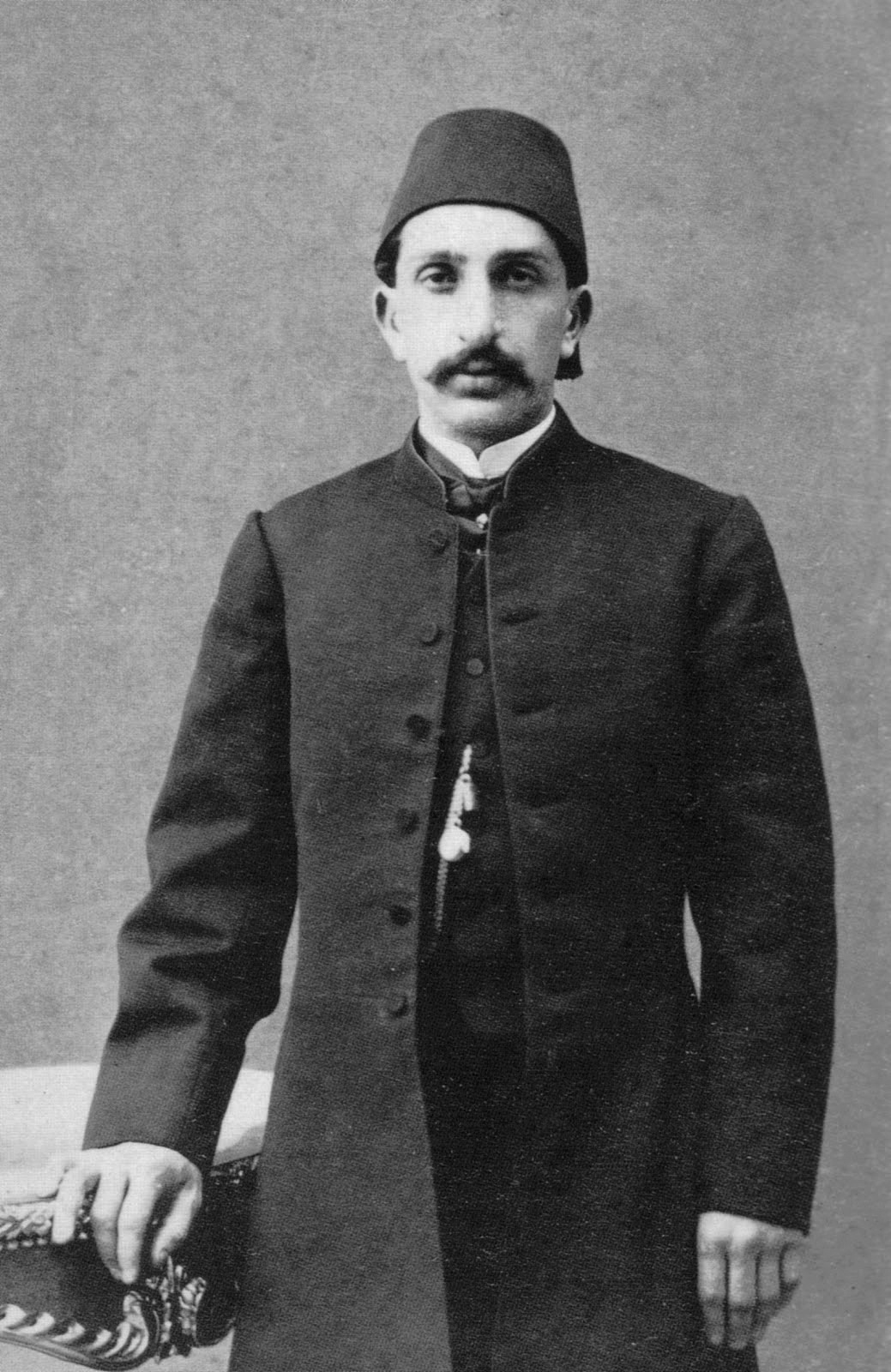
Sultan Abdul Hamid II

- February 1 – Princess Leonilla Bariatinskaya, Russian aristocrat (b. 1816)
- February 2 – John L. Sullivan, American boxer, World Heavyweight Champion (b. 1858)
- February 4 – Akiyama Saneyuki, Japanese admiral (b. 1868)
- February 6 – Gustav Klimt, Austrian painter (b. 1862), Spanish flu
- February 8 – Louis Renault, French jurist, educator and Nobel Prize laureate (b. 1843)
- February 10
  - Sultan Abdul Hamid II of the Ottoman Empire (b. 1842)
  - Ernesto Teodoro Moneta, Italian pacifist, Nobel Prize laureate (b. 1833)
- February 11 – Alexey Kaledin, Russian general (suicide) (b. 1861)
- February 14 – Sir Cecil Spring Rice, British diplomat (b. 1859)
- February 15 – Vernon Castle, British-born American dancer (b. 1887)
- February 16 – Károly Khuen-Héderváry, 2-time Prime Minister of Hungary (b. 1849)
- February 23
  - Adolphus Frederick VI, Grand Duke of Mecklenburg-Strelitz (b. 1882)
  - Thomas Brassey, 1st Earl Brassey, British politician and colonial administrator (b. 1836)

=== March ===
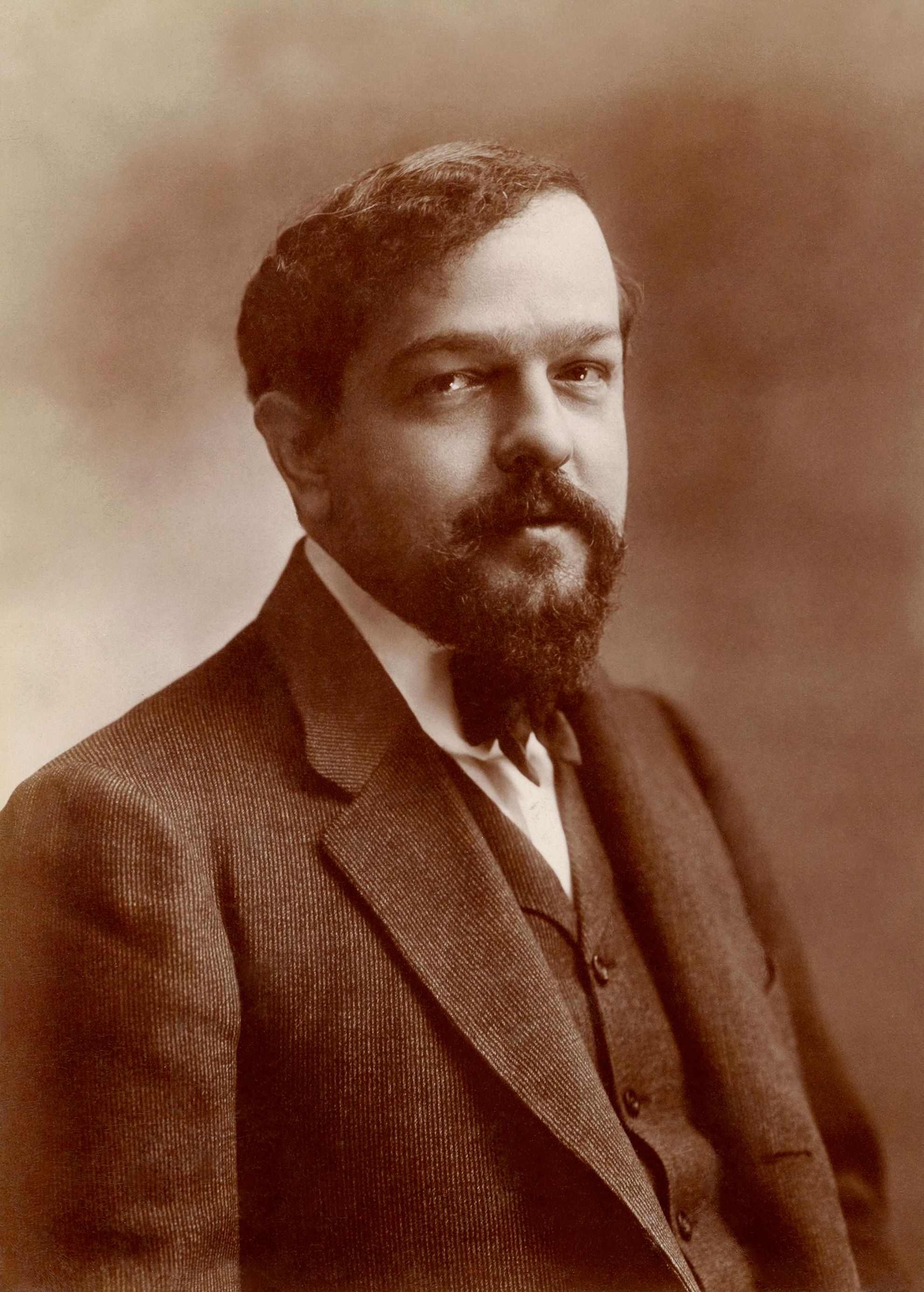
Claude Debussy

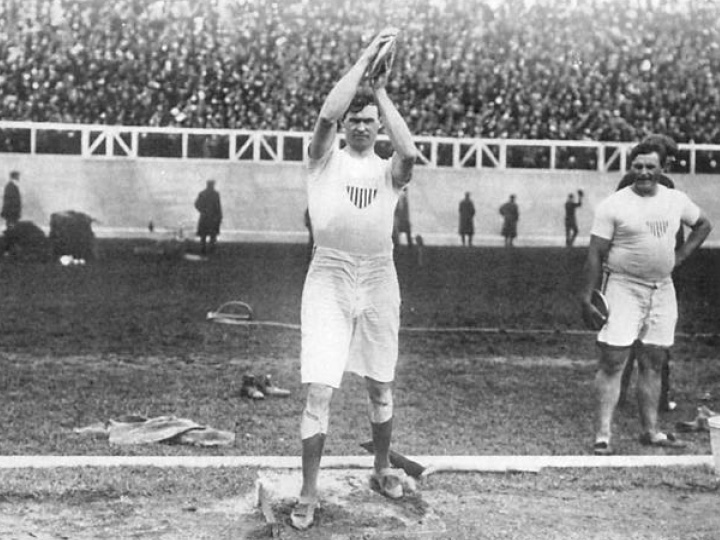
Martin Sheridan

- March 2 – Prince Mirko of Montenegro (b. 1879)
- March 9 – Frank Wedekind, German playwright (b. 1864)
- March 10 – Hans-Joachim Buddecke, German flying ace (killed in action) (b. 1890)
- March 13 – César Cui, Lithuanian composer (b. 1835)
- March 14
  - Lucretia Garfield, First Lady of the United States (b. 1832)
  - Gennaro Rubino, Italian anarchist who unsuccessfully tried to assassinate King Leopold II of Belgium (b. 1859)
- March 15 – Adolf Ritter von Tutschek, German fighter ace (killed in action) (b. 1891)
- March 23 – T. P. Cameron Wilson, English poet, novelist (b. 1888)
- March 25
  - Claude Debussy, French composer (b. 1862)
  - Walter Tull, first Black infantry officer to serve in the British Army (b. 1888)
- March 27
  - Henry Adams, American historian (b. 1838)
  - Martin Sheridan, American Olympic athlete (b. 1881), Spanish flu
- March 29 – Alfred Gaselee, British general (b. 1844)

=== April ===
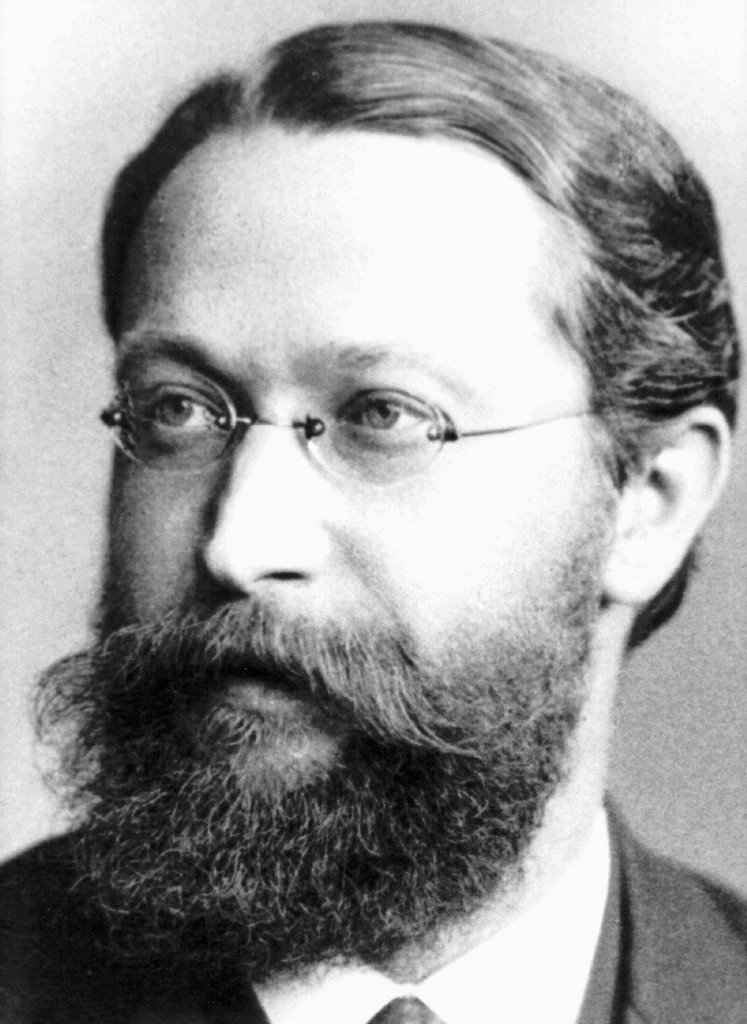
Karl Ferdinand Braun

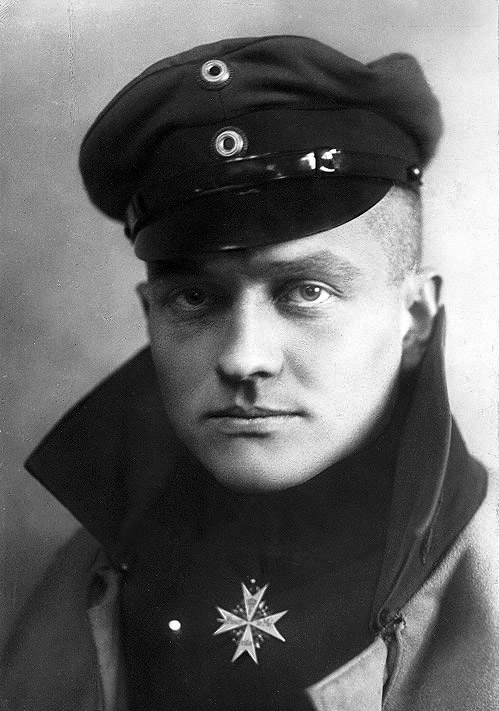
Manfred von Richthofen

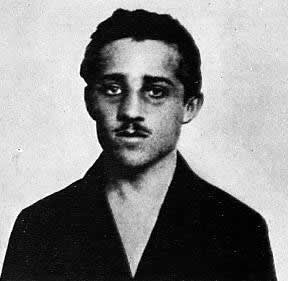
Gavrilo Princip

- April 1
  - Isaac Rosenberg, British war poet (killed in action) (b. 1890)
  - Paul von Rennenkampf, Russian general (executed) (b. 1854)
- April 4 – Hermann Cohen, German philosopher (b. 1842)
- April 5 – King George Tupou II of Tonga (b. 1874)
- April 11 – Otto Wagner, Austro-Hungarian architect, urban planner (b. 1841)
- April 19 – William Hope Hodgson, English author (b. 1877)
- April 20
  - Jussi Merinen, Finnish politician (executed) (b. 1873)
  - Karl Ferdinand Braun, German physicist, Nobel Prize laureate (b. 1850)
  - Paul Gautsch von Frankenthurn, Austrian statesman, Prime Minister (b. 1851)
- April 21
  - Friedrich II, Duke of Anhalt (b. 1856)
  - Manfred von Richthofen, German fighter pilot, top-scoring ace of World War I (killed in action) (b. 1892)
- April 27 – Jacques Duchesne, French general (b. 1837)
- April 28 – Gavrilo Princip, Yugoslav assassin (b. 1894)

=== May ===
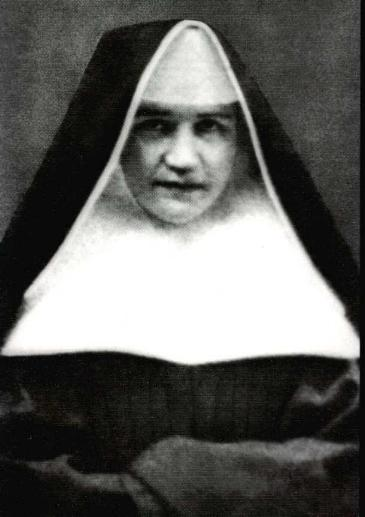
Maria Magdalena Merten

- May 2
  - Ernie Parker, Australian tennis champion (killed in action) (b. 1883)
  - Jüri Vilms, Estonian politician (b. 1889)
- May 14 – James Gordon Bennett Jr., American newspaper publisher (b. 1841)
- May 17 – William Drew Robeson I, African-American minister, father of singer and actor Paul Robeson (b. 1844)
- May 18 – Blandine Merten, German nun and Blessed (b. 1883)
- May 19
  - Ferdinand Hodler, Swiss painter (b. 1853)
  - Raoul Lufbery, Franco-American fighter pilot (killed in action) (b. 1885)
- May 21
  - Sofia Hjulgrén, Finnish politician (executed) (b. 1875)
  - Wilho Laine, Finnish politician (executed) (b. 1875)
- May 23
  - Gerard Noel, British admiral (b. 1845)
  - Mariano Ponce, Filipino diplomat, politician and writer (b. 1863)
- May 24 – József Kiss, Austro-Hungarian fighter pilot (killed in action) (b. 1896)
- May 30 – Georgi Plekhanov, Russian revolutionary, philosopher (b. 1856)

=== June ===
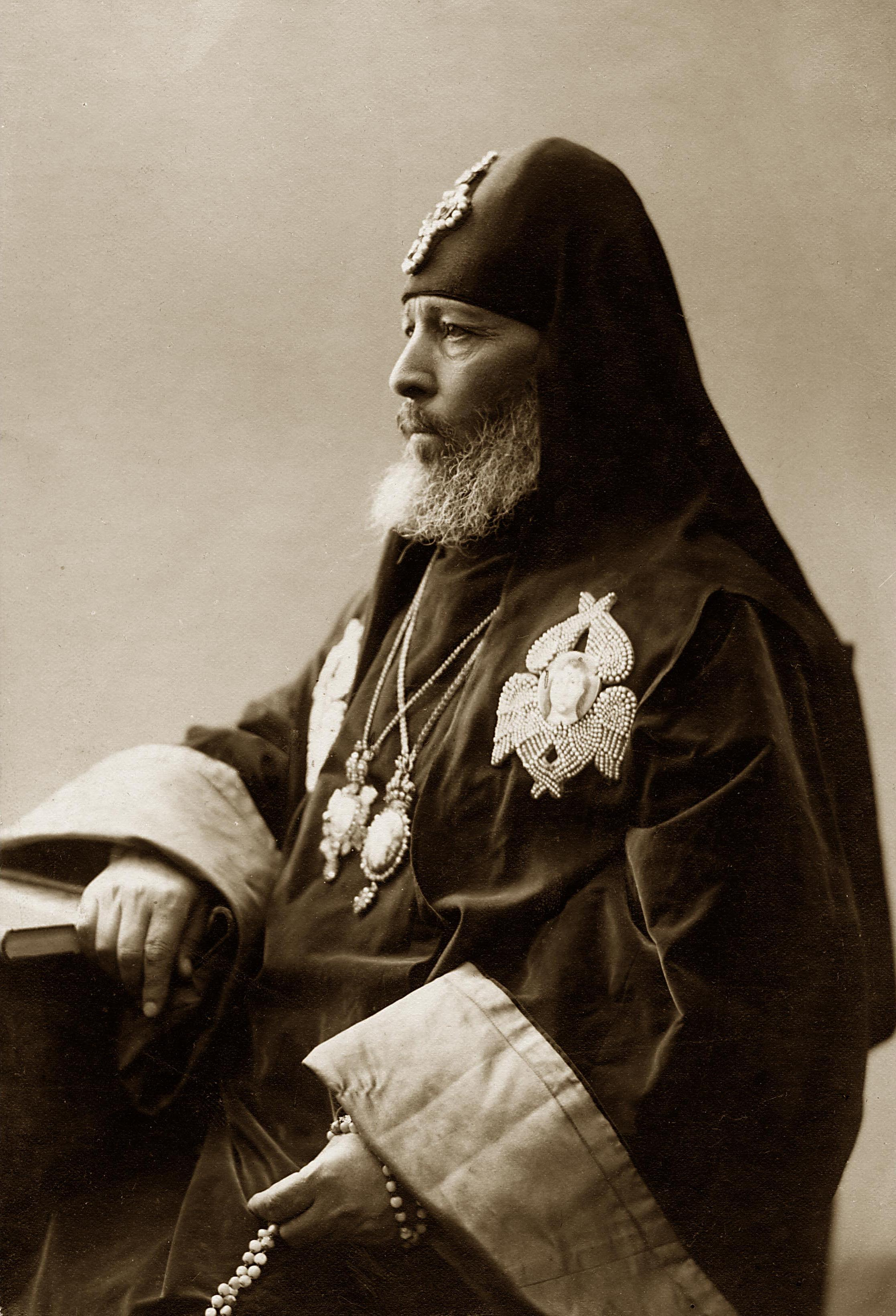
Kyrion II of Georgia

- June 1 – Roderic Dallas, Australian fighter pilot (killed in action) (b. 1891)
- June 3 – Count Richard von Bienerth-Schmerling, Austrian noble, statesman and former Prime Minister (b. 1863)
- June 4 – Charles W. Fairbanks, 26th Vice President of the United States (b. 1852)
- June 10 – Arrigo Boito, Italian poet, composer (b. 1842)
- June 13 – Grand Duke Michael Romanov (assassinated) (b. 1878)
- June 15 – Frank Miles Day, American architect (b. 1861)
- June 16 – Bazil Assan, Romanian engineer and explorer (b. 1860)
- June 19 – Francesco Baracca, Italian fighter pilot (air crash) (b. 1888)
- June 26 – Kyrion II of Georgia, Georgian Orthodox patriarch, Saint (b. 1855)
- June 27 – Joséphin Péladan, French occultist (b. 1858)

=== July ===
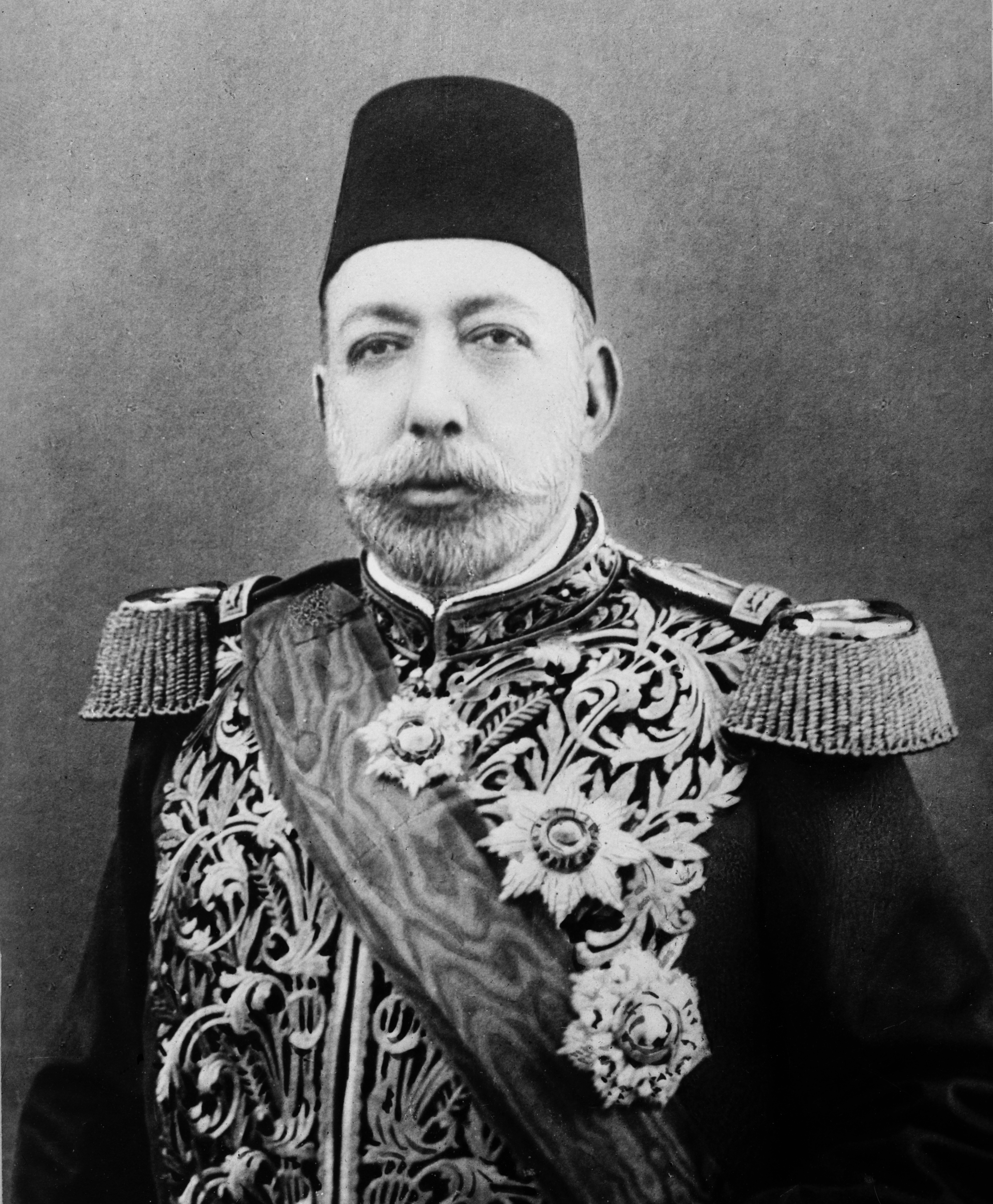
Sultan Mehmed V

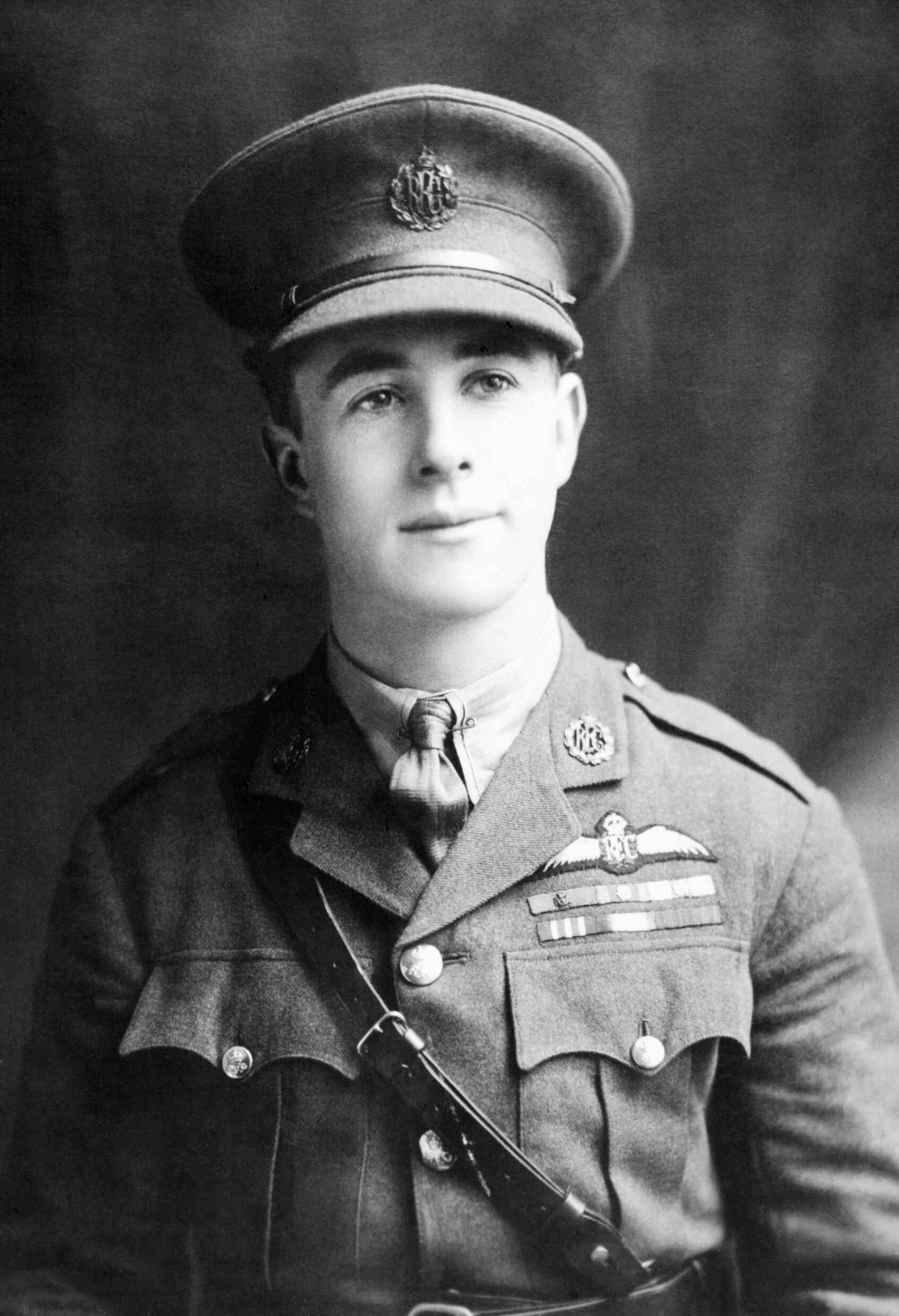
James McCudden

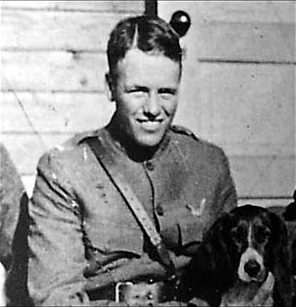
Quentin Roosevelt

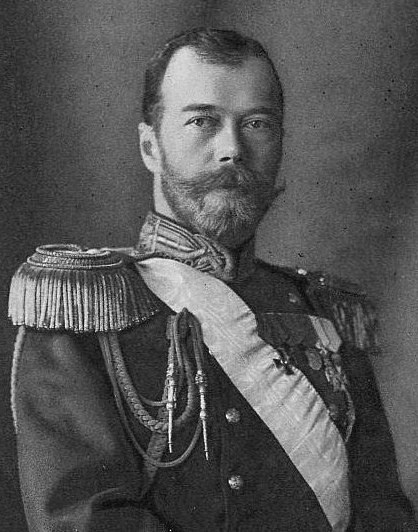
Emperor Nicholas II of Russia

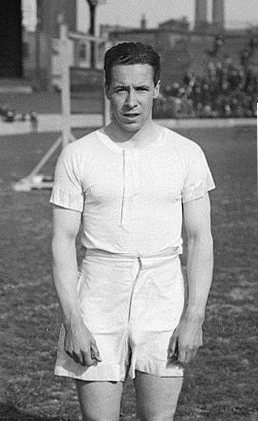
Henry Macintosh

- July 3 – Sultan Mehmed V of the Ottoman Empire (b. 1844)
- July 9 – James McCudden, British fighter pilot (air crash) (b. 1895)
- July 14 – Quentin Roosevelt, youngest son of United States President Theodore Roosevelt, fighter pilot (killed in action) (b. 1897)
- July 17 – Executed members of the Romanov family:
  - Former Emperor Nicholas II of Russia (b. 1868)
  - Former Empress Alexandra Feodorovna of Russia (b. 1872)
  - Grand Duchess Olga Nikolaevna of Russia (b. 1895)
  - Grand Duchess Tatiana Nikolaevna of Russia (b. 1897)
  - Grand Duchess Maria Nikolaevna of Russia (b. 1899)
  - Grand Duchess Anastasia Nikolaevna of Russia (b. 1901)
  - Former Tsarevich Alexei Nikolaevich of Russia (b. 1904)
- July 18
  - Prince Constantine Constantinovich of Russia (executed) (b. 1891)
  - Prince Igor Constantinovich of Russia (executed) (b. 1894)
  - Grand Duke Sergei Mikhailovich of Russia (executed) (b. 1869)
  - Grand Duchess Elisabeth of Russia (Princess Elisabeth of Hesse and by Rhine) (executed) (b. 1864)
- July 20 – Francis Lupo, American soldier (b. 1895)
- July 22
  - Roy Earl Parrish, American politician (killed in action) (b. 1888)
  - Manuel González Prada, Peruvian politician, author (b. 1844)
  - Indra Lal Roy, Indian fighter pilot (killed in action) (b. 1898)
  - Alexey Schastny, Russian naval officer (executed) (b. 1881)
- July 26
  - Henry Macintosh, British Olympic athlete (killed in action) (b. 1892)
  - Edward Mannock, British fighter pilot (killed in action) (b. 1887)
- July 29 – Ernest William Christmas, Australian painter (b. 1863)
- July 30
  - Hermann von Eichhorn, German field marshal (assassinated) (b. 1848)
  - Joyce Kilmer, American journalist, poet (killed in action) (b. 1886)
  - Frank Linke-Crawford, Austro-Hungarian fighter pilot (killed in action) (b. 1893)
- July 31 – George McElroy, British fighter pilot (killed in action) (b. 1893)

=== August ===
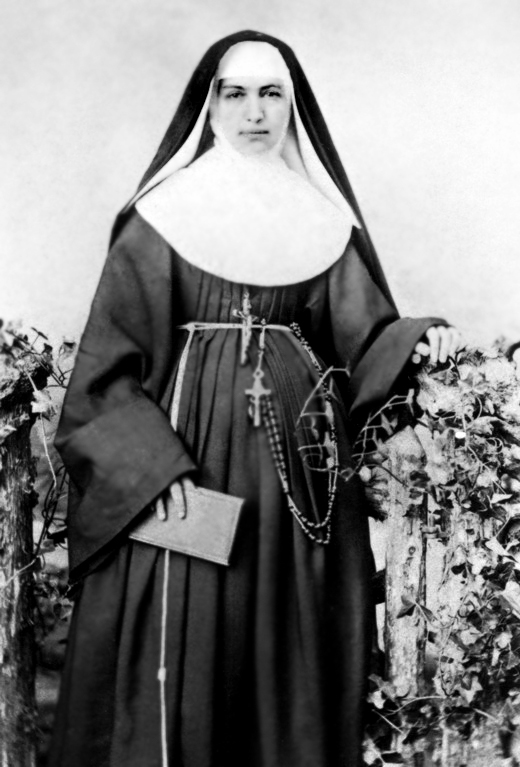
Marianne Cope

- August 1
  - John Riley Banister, American policeman, cowboy (b. 1854)
  - Gabriel Guérin, French World War I fighter ace (air crash) (b. 1892)
- August 5 – Peter Strasser, German naval officer, airship commander (killed in action) (b. 1876)
- August 9
  - Marianne Cope, German-born American Roman Catholic nun and saint (b. 1838)
  - František Plesnivý, Austro-Hungarian architect (b. 1845)
- August 10
  - Jean Brillant, Canadian soldier, Victoria Cross recipient (killed in action) (b. 1890)
  - Erich Löwenhardt, German World War I fighter ace (air crash) (b. 1897)
  - Aleksander Uurits, Estonian painter, graphic artist (b. 1888)
- August 12 – Anna Held, French actress (b. 1872)
- August 22 – Korbinian Brodmann, German neurologist (b. 1868)
- August 30 – William Duncan, British missionary in Canada and the United States (b. 1832)

=== September ===
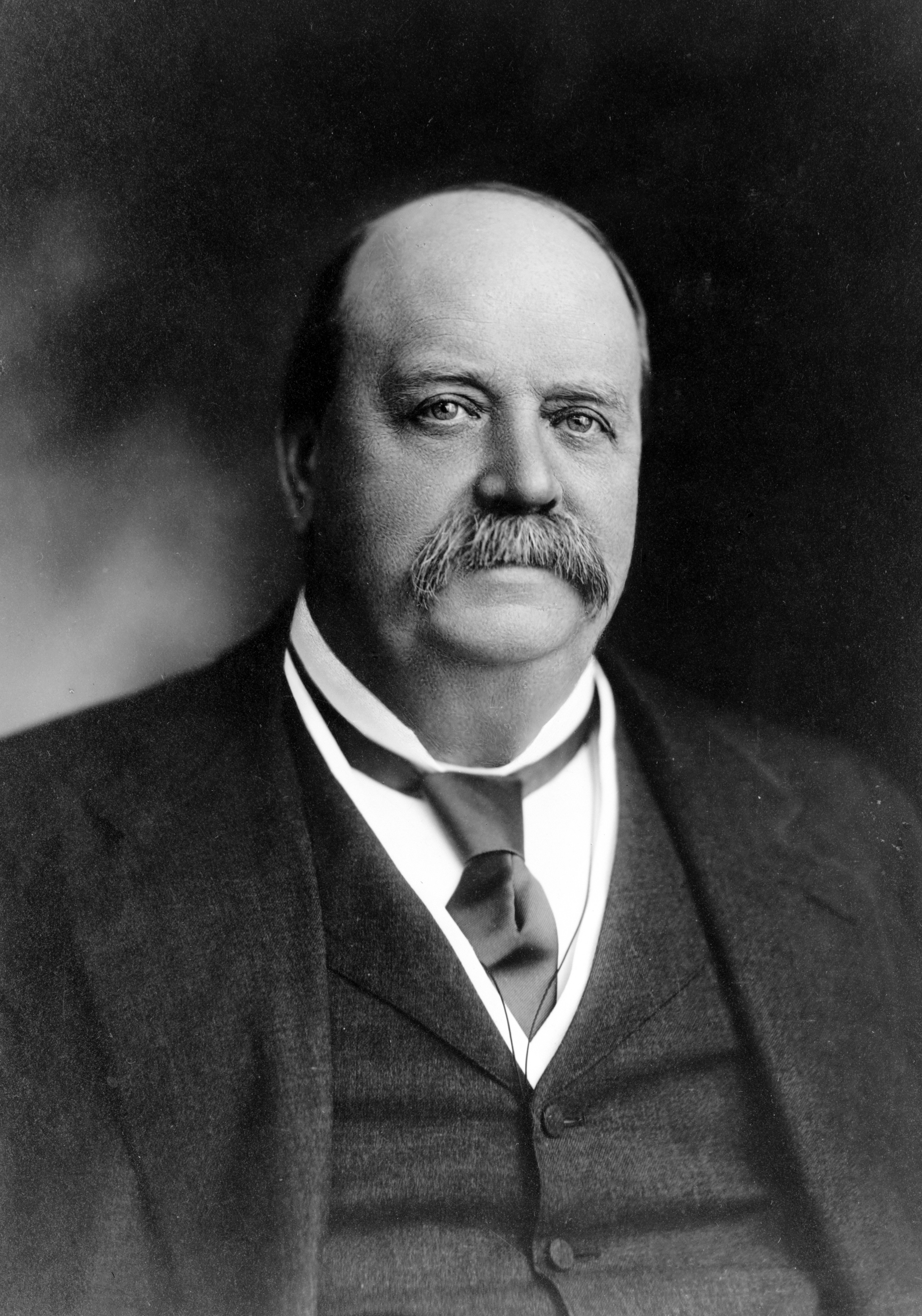
George Reid

Eduard, Duke of Anhalt

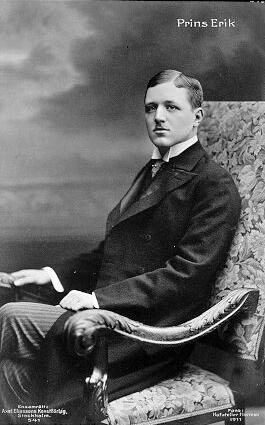
Prince Erik, Duke of Vastmanland

- Mudbir al-Far'un, Arab chieftain, leader of 1913 Euphrates rebellion
- September 2 – Sir John Forrest, Australian explorer and politician, 1st Premier of Western Australia (b. 1847)
- September 5 – Nikolay Maklakov, Russian politician, former minister of the Interior (b. 1871)
- September 6 – Elizabeth Yates, New Zealand politician (b. 1845)
- September 8
  - Francis Mary of the Cross Jordan, German Roman Catholic priest and venerable (b. 1848)
  - Mikael of Wollo, Ethiopian army commander and Ras of Wollo (b. 1850)
- September 12 – Sir George Reid, 4th Prime Minister of Australia (b. 1845)
- September 13 – Eduard, Duke of Anhalt (b. 1861)
- September 16 – Maurice Boyau, French World War I fighter ace (killed in action) (b. 1888)
- September 18 – Joseph Frank Wehner, American World War I fighter ace (killed in action) (b. 1895)
- September 20 – Prince Erik, Duke of Västmanland (b. 1889), Spanish flu
- September 27 – Fritz Rumey, German World War I fighter ace (killed in action) (b. 1891)
- September 28
  - True Boardman, American actor (b. 1882), Spanish flu
  - Georg Simmel, German sociologist, philosopher (b. 1858)
  - Freddie Stowers, American soldier (killed in action) (b. 1896)
- September 29 – Frank Luke, American World War I fighter ace (killed in action) (b. 1897)

=== October ===
- October 4 – Nikolai Skrydlov, Russian admiral (b. 1844)
- October 5
  - Roland Garros, French fighter pilot (killed in action) (b. 1888)
  - Robbie Ross, British writer (b. 1869)
- October 6 – Arthur O'Hara Wood, Australian tennis champion and fighter pilot (killed in action) (b. 1890)
- October 7 – Sir Hubert Parry, British composer (b. 1848), Spanish flu
- October 8 – Mikhail Alekseyev, Russian general (b. 1857)
- October 9 – Raymond Duchamp-Villon, French sculptor (b. 1876)
- October 11 – Wallace Lloyd Algie, Canadian soldier (killed in action) (b. 1891)
- October 14 – Louis Lipsett, Irish-born British general (killed in action) (b. 1874)
- October 15 – Sai Baba of Shirdi, Indian guru, yogi and National saint of India (b. 1838)
- October 16 – Felix Arndt, American pianist, composer (b. 1889), Spanish flu
- October 18
  - Radko Dimitriev, Bulgarian, Russian general (executed) (b. 1859)
  - Jildo Irwa, Ugandan Roman Catholic martyr and saint (executed) (b. 1906)
  - Daudo Okelo, Ugandan Roman Catholic martyr and saint (executed) (b. ca. 1900)
  - Nikolai Ruzsky, Russian general (executed) (b. 1854)
- October 19
  - Harold Lockwood, American actor (b. 1887), Spanish flu
  - Prince Umberto, Count of Salemi (b. 1889), Spanish flu
- October 24
  - César Ritz, Swiss hotelier (b. 1850)
  - Daniel Burley Woolfall, English administrator, 2nd President of FIFA (b. 1852)
- October 25 – Amadeo de Souza Cardoso, Portuguese painter (b. 1887), Spanish flu
- October 29
  - Michel Coiffard, French World War I fighter ace (killed in action) (b. 1892)
  - Rudolf Tobias, Estonian composer (b. 1873)
- October 31
  - Egon Schiele, Austrian artist (b. 1890), Spanish flu
  - István Tisza, 2-time Prime Minister of Hungary (assassinated) (b. 1861)

=== November ===
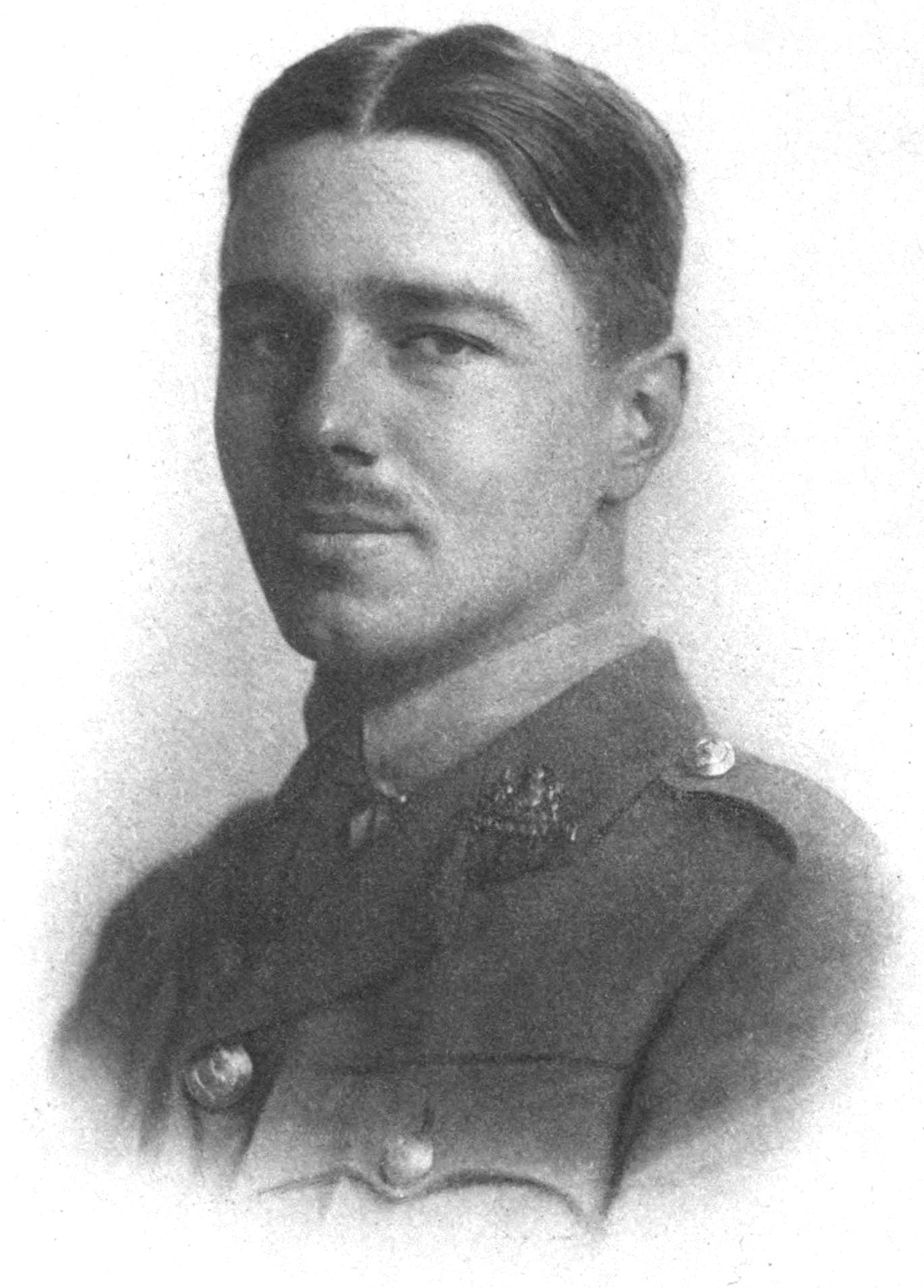
Wilfred Owen

- November 1 – Vladimir Vasilyevich Smirnov, Russian general (executed) (b. 1849)
- November 2 – Hugh Cairns, Canadian soldier (b. 1896)
- November 4
  - Wilfred Owen, British poet, soldier (killed in action) (b. 1893)
  - Andrew Dickson White, American academic and diplomat, co-founder of Cornell University (b. 1832)
- November 5
  - Samuel Liddell MacGregor Mathers, British occultist (b. 1854), Spanish flu
  - William Shea, British actor (b. 1856)
- November 6 – Alan Arnett McLeod, Canadian soldier (b. 1899), Spanish flu
- November 9
  - Guillaume Apollinaire, French poet (b. 1880), Spanish flu
  - Albert Ballin, German shipping magnate (b. 1857)
  - Victor Conyngham, 5th Marquess Conyngham, British politician, soldier (b. 1883), Spanish flu
  - Sir Peter Lumsden, British general in the Indian Army (b. 1829)
- November 11
  - Victor Adler, Austrian politician (b. 1852)
  - George Lawrence Price, last Commonwealth soldier to die in WWI (b. 1892)
- November 12 – Aleksei Evert, Russian general (executed) (b. 1857; may have died in 1926)
- November 14 – Matti Lonkainen, Finnish politician (b. 1874)
- November 15 – Sir Robert Anderson, British police officer (b. 1841), Spanish flu
- November 19 – Joseph F. Smith, 6th President of The Church of Jesus Christ of Latter-day Saints (b. 1838)
- November 20 – John Bauer, Swedish painter (b. 1882)
- November 22 – Rose Cleveland, de facto First Lady of the United States (b. 1846), Spanish flu
- November 23 – Fritz von Below, German general (b. 1853)
- November 30 – Karl Petrovich Jessen, Russian admiral (b. 1852)

=== December ===
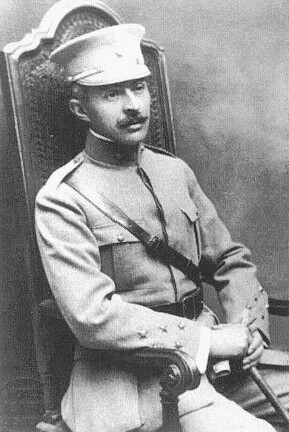
Sidónio Pais

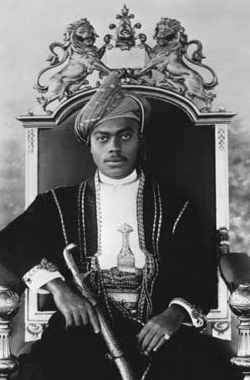
Sultan Ali bin Hamud of Zanzibar

- December 2 – Edmond Rostand, French writer (b. 1868), Spanish flu
- December 4 – Princess Teriivaetua of Tahiti (b. 1869), Spanish flu
- December 5 – Schalk Willem Burger, Boer military leader, lawyer, politician, statesman, and acting President of the South African Republic (1900–1902) (b. 1852)
- December 9 – Samuel Swett Green, American library pioneer (b. 1837)
- December 11 – Ivan Cankar, Slovenian writer (b. 1876), Spanish flu
- December 13 – Emory Speer, American politician, jurist, and United States district judge from 1885 until 1918 (b. 1848)
- December 14 – Sidónio Pais, Portuguese politician, general, diplomat, 66th Prime Minister of Portugal and 4th President of Portugal (b. 1872), assassinated
- December 20 – Sultan Ali bin Hamud of Zanzibar (b. 1884)
- December 21 – Prince Konrad of Hohenlohe-Waldenburg-Schillingsfürst, Austrian statesman, former Prime Minister (b. 1863)
- December 28 – Olavo Bilac, Brazilian poet (b. 1865)

=== Date unknown ===
- Spring – Vyacheslav Troyanov, Russian general (b. 1875)
- Yakov Zhilinsky, Russian general (b. 1853)

== Nobel Prizes ==

- Physics – Max Planck
- Chemistry – Fritz Haber
- Medicine – not awarded
- Literature – not awarded
- Peace – not awarded
