= Satterlee =

Satterlee may refer to:

== People with the name ==
- Charles Satterlee (1875–1918), officer in the United States Coast Guard during World War I
- Henry Y. Satterlee (1843–1908), American Episcopal bishop
- Herbert L. Satterlee (1863–1947), American lawyer and government official
- Kevin Satterlee (born 1968), President of Idaho State University
- Marion Satterlee, American botanical artist
- Richard Sherwood Satterlee (1798–1880), medical officer in the United States Army
- Walter Satterlee (1844-1908), American painter
- Satterlee Clark Jr. (1816-1881), American politician

== Other uses ==
- USS Satterlee (DD-190), a Clemson-class destroyer, commissioned in 1919 and decommissioned in 1922
- USS Satterlee (DD-626), a Gleaves-class destroyer, commissioned in 1943 and decommissioned in 1946
- Satterlee General Hospital, a hospital in Philadelphia, Pennsylvania

== See also ==
- Satterly (includes Satterley)
