= Yokohama Specie Bank =

Japanese bank

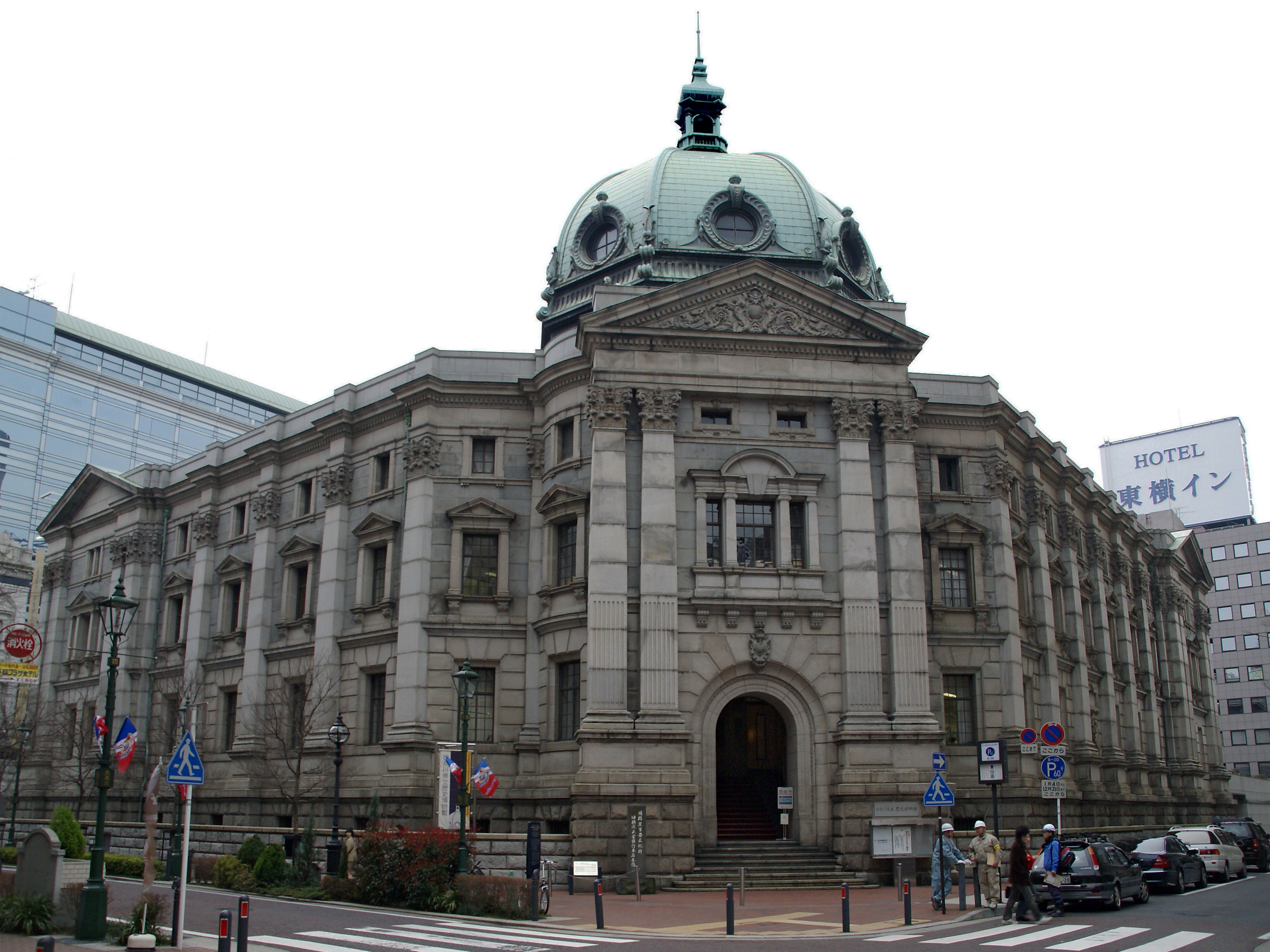
Former head office building in Yokohama, designed by architect Tsumaki Yorinaka and completed in 1904; since 1967, the seat of the Kanagawa Prefectural Museum of Cultural History

The Yokohama Specie Bank (横浜正金銀行, Yokohama Shōkin Ginkō; YSB) was a Japanese bank founded in Yokohama in 1880, which dominated the Japanese market for trade finance in subsequent decades. It has been described as a "quasi-governmental exchange bank that was the overseas financial agent of the Japanese government".

During the 1920s, the YSB accounted for nearly 50 per cent of foreign exchange transactions for Japanese exports and imports, and in 1929 was Japan's largest and most profitable bank aside from the Bank of Japan. It also played a significant role in Japanese colonial ventures, not least in Manchuria and elsewhere in China.

In 1946, following the loss of Japan's overseas possessions, the Yokohama Specie Bank was reorganized and rebranded as the Bank of Tokyo, one of the predecessor entities of MUFG Bank.

== Background ==
Following the signing of the Japan-U.S. Treaty of Amity and Commerce in 1859, Yokohama was opened as a port for foreign trade and quickly grew in importance. Through the New Currency Act of 1871, Japan implemented a policy of convertibility with 1 yen corresponding to 1.5g of pure gold. Silver coins were also issued for trade with Asian countries who favoured silver as a currency, thus establishing a de facto gold-silver standard. Japan experienced high inflation in the late 1870s, however, caused by the 1877 Satsuma Rebellion and the outflow of a large amount of silver due to increased imports, generating a large discrepancy between government-issued banknotes and specie coin. This became a source of trouble for the merchants in Yokohama, as specie rather than banknotes came to be demanded for foreign trade.

== Establishment and early history ==
The creation of the YSB was initiated by statesman Ōkuma Shigenobu in alliance with Yokohama merchants, and submitted in November 1879 to the chief minister of the imperial government or Daijō-kan. Its concept was first advocated by early Meiji intellectual luminary Fukuzawa Yukichi, and its design inspired by the Hongkong and Shanghai Banking Corporation, which had a great influence on Japan's overseas trade and foreign exchange at the time. The bank was incorporated as the Japanese government approved the request on 28 February 1880. It was created by a syndicate of 22 individuals with the support of Fukuzawa and Inoue Kaoru on the basis of the National Bank Act, aiming to ensure the availability of specie for the trading community. The bank had an initial capitalization of three million Yen, of which one million was invested by the Ministry of Finance. The new bank opened an agency in New York and a branch office in Kobe, both also in 1880. The next year, the bank opened a sub-branch in London, which was upgraded to a branch in December 1884 after the bank was appointed by the Ministry of Finance to manage Japan's foreign exchange.

During the 1880s, the YSB came under increasingly direct control of the ministry of finance. Ōkuma's successor Matsukata Masayoshi engineered the dismissal of its first president Nakamura Michita in June 1882 and his eventual replacement in March 1883 by an ally, Hara Rokuro. In July 1887, the government promulgated the Yokohama Specie Bank Ordinance, which stipulated that branch offices be established everywhere that was regarded as important to Japanese foreign trade and authorized that an administrator from the Ministry of Finance would be assigned to monitor the bank's operations. This ordinance was revised in 1889 to authorize the Japanese government to overrule any decision by its directors, and if deemed necessary, to replace the directors with others of its choosing.

The YSB opened an office in Shanghai in 1893, its first in China. In 1894 it opened a branch in Bombay. In 1899 it upgraded its offices in Shanghai, Tianjin and Hong Kong to fully-fledged branches. By 1900 it also had branches in Beijing and Lyon, and its foreign lending was four times that of all the Zaibatsu banks together. In 1895, the Chinese indemnity for the Sino-Japanese War, set at 230 million silver taels, was deposited to the YSB's account at the Bank of England, providing the basis for the Bank of Japan's gold reserve.

== Early 20th century ==
The YSB established a first toehold into Manchuria by opening a branch in Yingkou in 1902. That same year, it started issuing banknotes in China, first in Shanghai and Yingkou, and then also in Tianjin, which it had not done until then out of concerns about antagonizing its Western banking partners.

With the Russo-Japanese War of 1904–1905, it further established branches in the Kwantung Leased Territory and served as paymaster for the Imperial Japanese Army, opening offices in Dalian, Liaoyang, Mukden and Tieling.

From 1906, the bank was permitted to issue its own gold-convertible banknotes for use in the Kwantung Leased Territory and in China. In July of the same year, Japan's first leased line telephone opened between the Bank of Japan and the Yokohama Specie Bank head office. In 1911, the bank signed an underwriting agreement with the Imperial Chinese Chunghwa Post for the establishment of a postal banking system in China.

New branches opened in 1910 in Honolulu, 1912 in Harbin, and 1915 in Sydney.

By 1911, the YSB was financing 45 percent of Japanese international trade, up from around 20 percent in 1887. Its deposit base evolved significantly during that period. The YSB did not collect deposits in mainland Japan, and initially relied mostly on its European and American branches for deposit collection. By 1913, however, about 9 percent of its deposits came from the branches in Shanghai and Tianjin, 6 percent from elsewhere in China proper, 9 percent from Manchuria, and around 10 percent from the rest of Greater China; The YSB's total deposit volume by then was around 60 percent of that of HSBC, and well ahead of the Bank of China which had lost much of the deposit base of its predecessor the Da-Qing Bank following China's 1911 Revolution.

In the late 1900s, the YSB had gained a monopoly on yen-denominated note issuance in Manchuria. In December 1917, however, it lost that privilege which was transferred to the Bank of Chōsen at the initiative of the government led by Terauchi Masatake which envisioned a future monetary unification of Manchuria with Japanese-ruled Korea. Simultaneously, the Bank of Chōsen took over the YSB branches in Lüshun, Liaoyang, Tieling, and Andong; the latter was closed down as it overlapped with the branch that the Bank of Chōsen had opened on its own in 1909.

On 4 October 1918, London branch sub-manager S. Ujie, his wife and three sons, together with bank employee Takashi Aoki and wife Sueko, died when German U-boat UB-91 sank the Hirano Maru.

== Interwar period ==
By 1919, the YSB had an expanded network of 30 overseas branches, of which seven were in Manchuria, seven in the rest of Mainland China, five in Southeast Asia and Australia, three in India, two in South America, and six in Europe and the United States, including the most important by far in London. Its Chinese note circulation peaked in late 1918, after which it was negatively affected by local boycotts in the wake of the May Fourth Movement. It still opened more branches in Qingdao (1919), Hankou (1921), Vladivostok (1924), Mukden (1925), and Tianjin (1926). In 1927, it inaugurated a new building for its branch in Tokyo, across the street from the Bank of Japan.

During the 1920s, the YSB came under increasing competitive pressure from Mitsui Bank, Bank of Taiwan and others. Even so, by 1929 the YSB had a total 37 offices outside of Japan and its colonies, by far the largest international network of any Japanese bank. It regained market share in the 1930s in the environment of tightened exchange controls.

== Wartime development and establishment of the Bank of Tokyo ==
The bank continued in its role as the paymaster for the Imperial Japanese Army during the Second Sino-Japanese War and Pacific War, assisted by its widespread branch office network. Its assets in New York and Honolulu were seized by the United States government in the year 1941. In 1947, following the surrender of Japan, the bank's operations were reorganized into the Bank of Tokyo as part of anti-zaibatsu ordinances issued by the American occupation authorities. The legal entity of the former YSB was eventually liquidated in 1963.

== Presidents ==
- December 1879 – July 1882: Nakamura Michita
- July 1882 – January 1883: Ōno Mitsukage
- January – March 1883: Shirasu Taizō
- March 1883 – March 1890: Hara Rokurō
- March 1890 – April 1897: Sonoda Kokichi
- March 1897 – March 1906: Sōma Nagatane
- March 1906 – June 1911: Takahashi Korekiyo
- March 1911 – February 1913: Mishima Yatarō
- February - September 1913: Mizumachi Kesaroku
- September 1913 – March 1919: Junnosuke Inoue
- March 1919 – March 1922: Kajihara Nakaji
- March 1922 – September 1936: Kodama Kenji
- September 1936 – March 1943: Toshikata Ōkubo
- March 1943 – June 1945: Hideshige Kashiwagi
- June 1945 – July 1946: Shōji Arakawa
- June – December 1946: Itsuki Takada

== Former branches ==
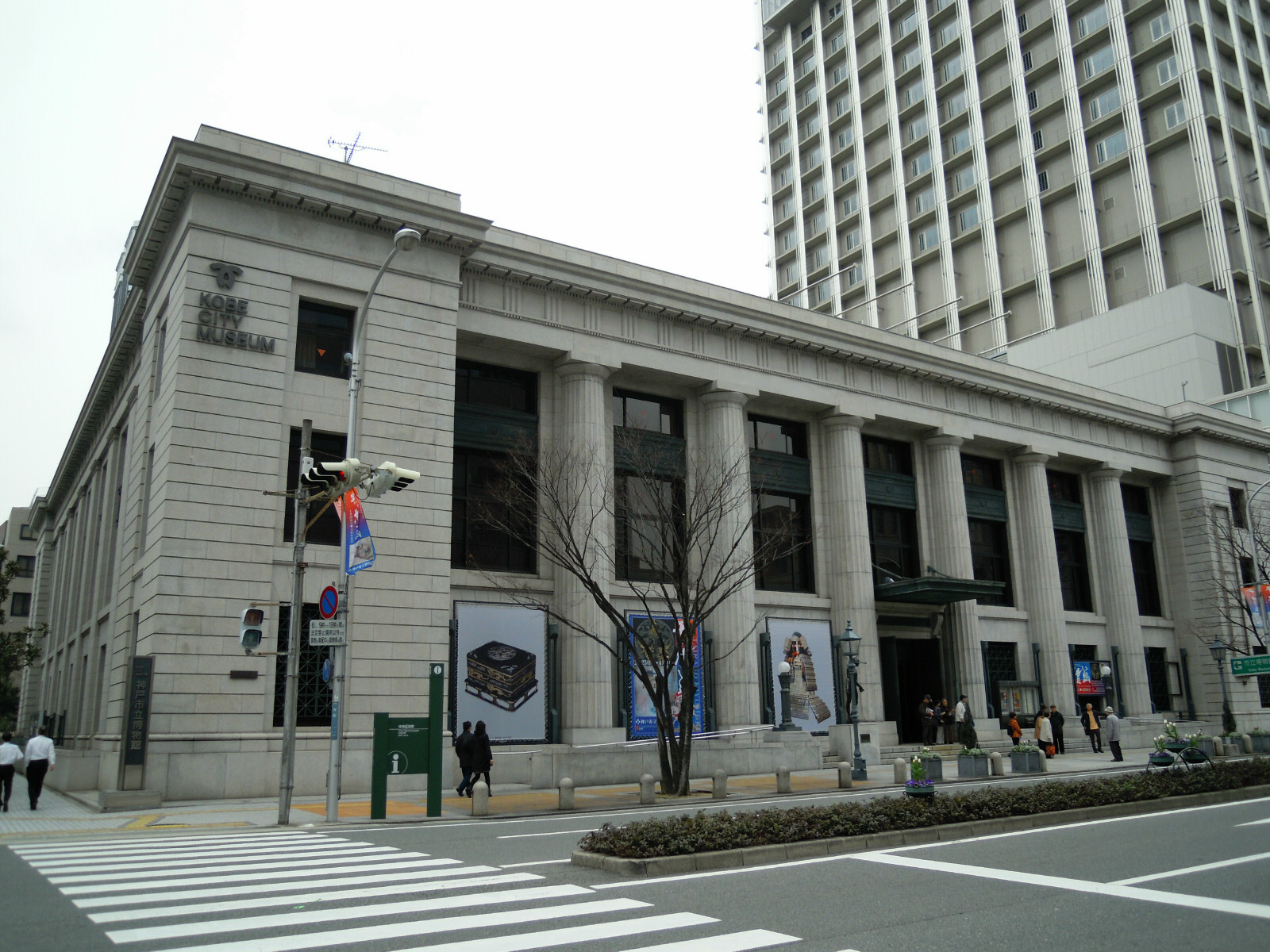
Former branch in Kobe, now Kobe City Museum

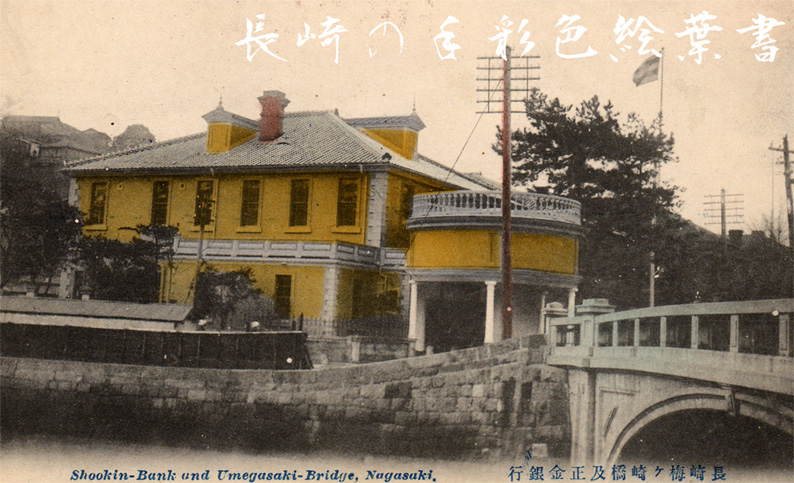
Former branch in Nagasaki

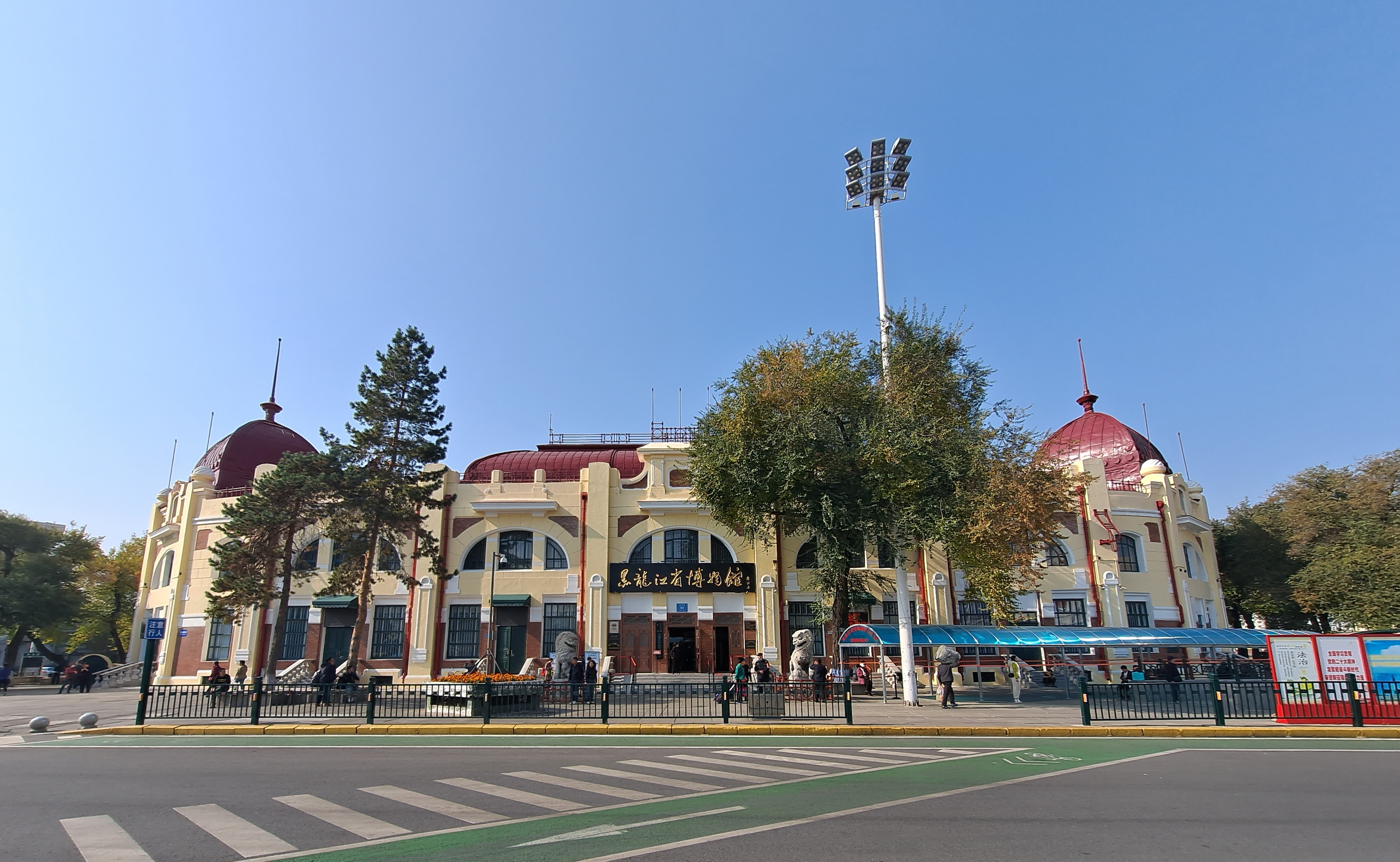
Former branch in Harbin, now Heilongjiang Provincial Museum

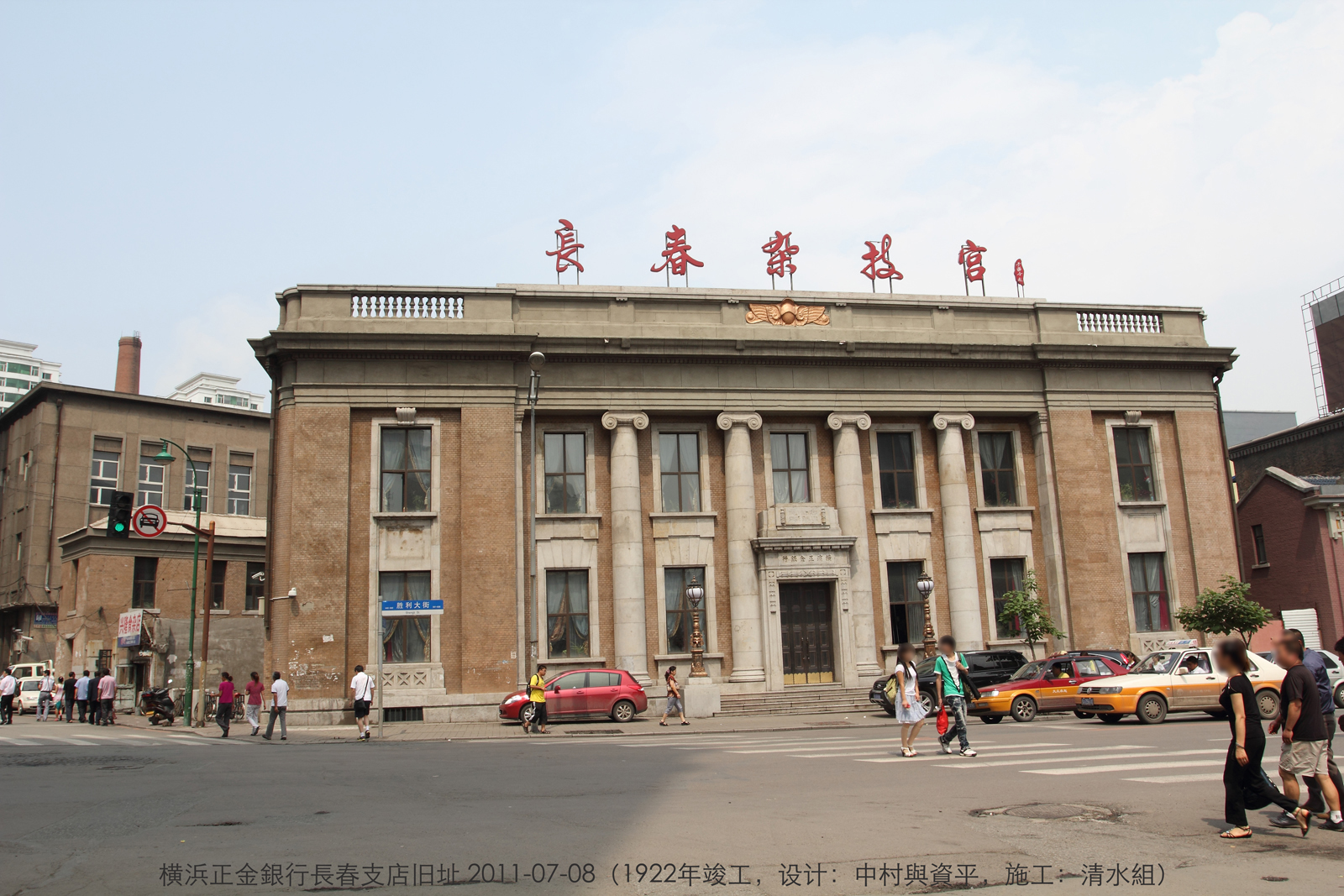
Former branch in Changchun, now the seat of the Changchun Acrobatic Troupe

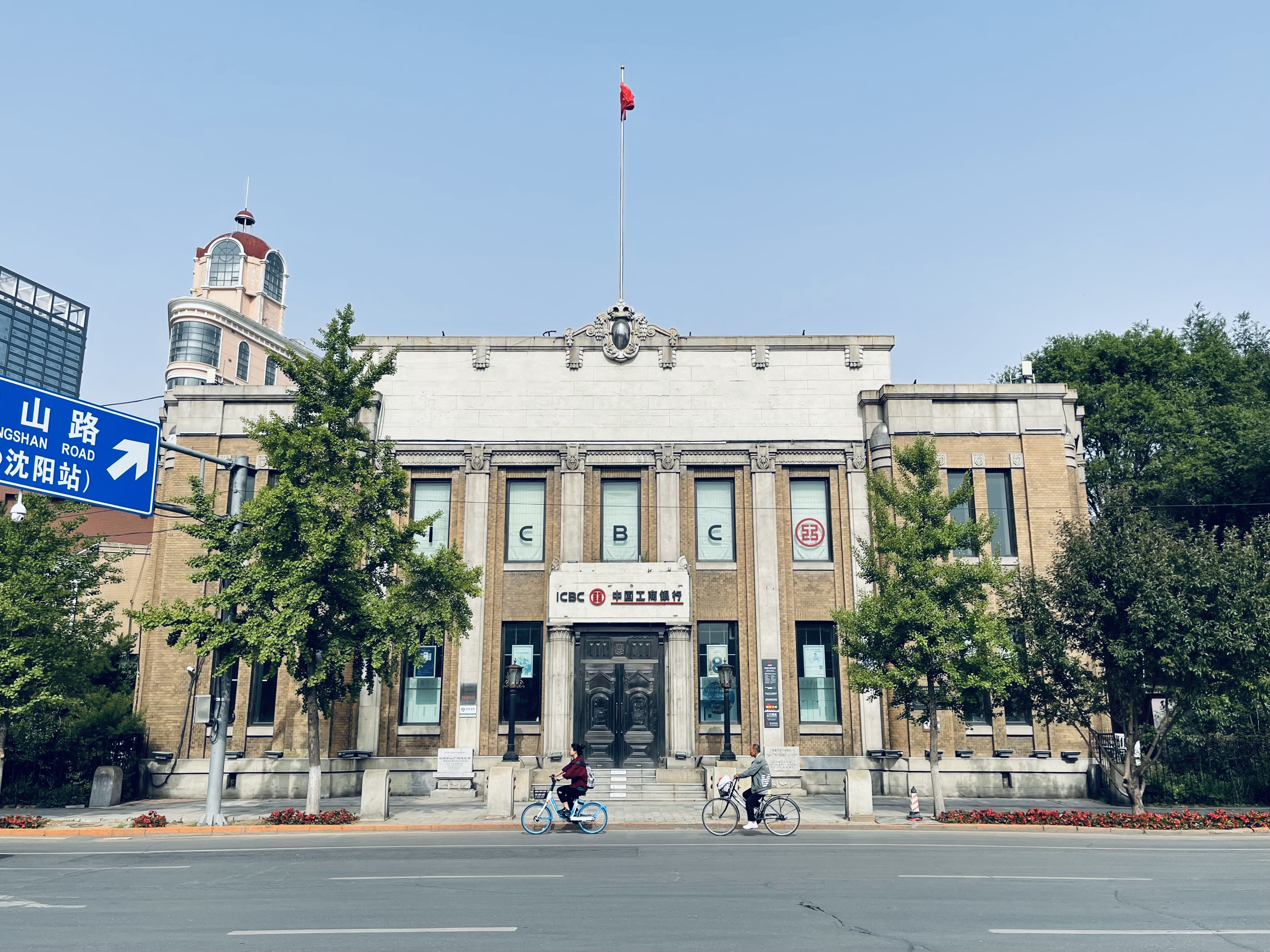
Former branch in Shenyang, now ICBC

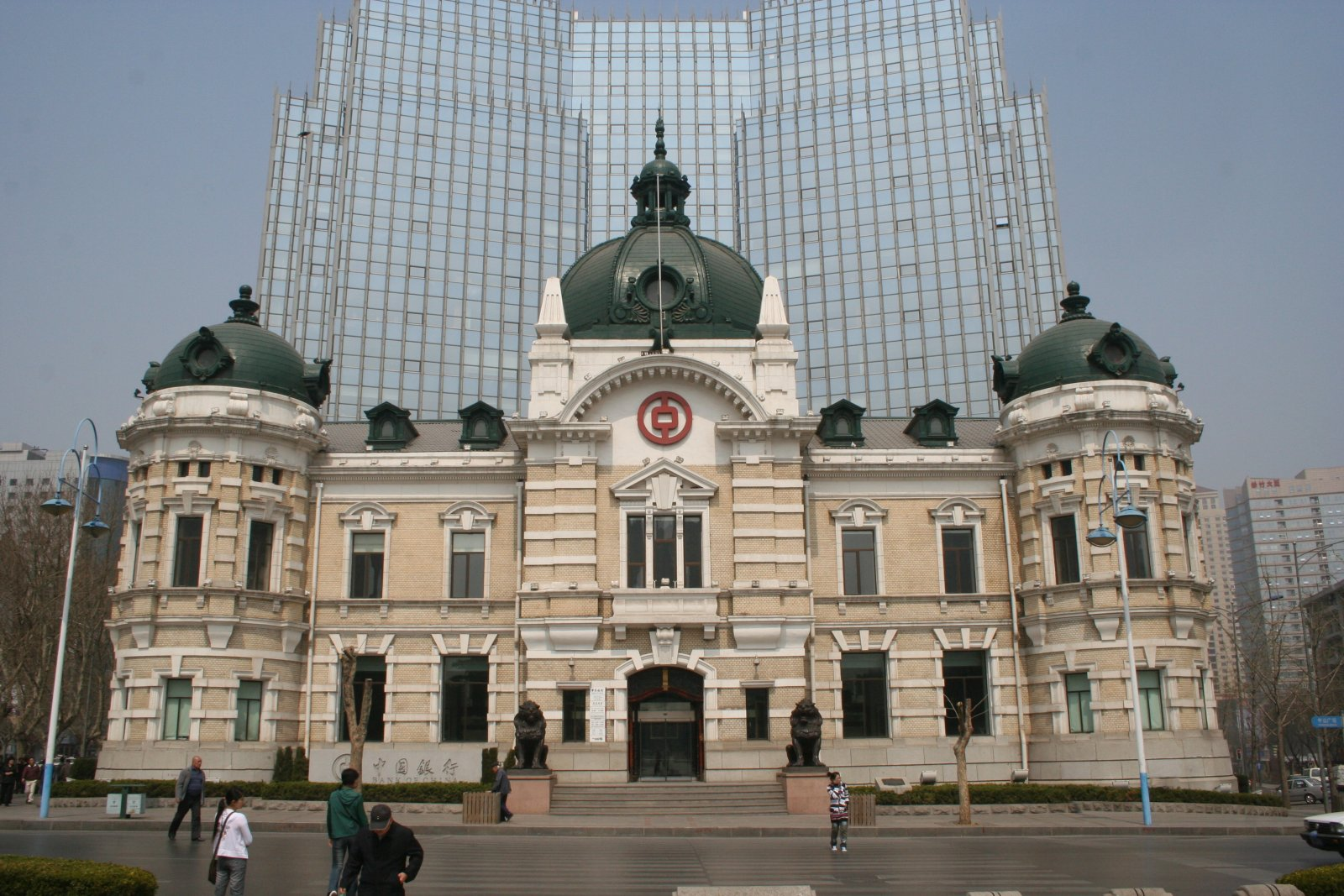
Former branch in Dalian, built in 1909, now Bank of China

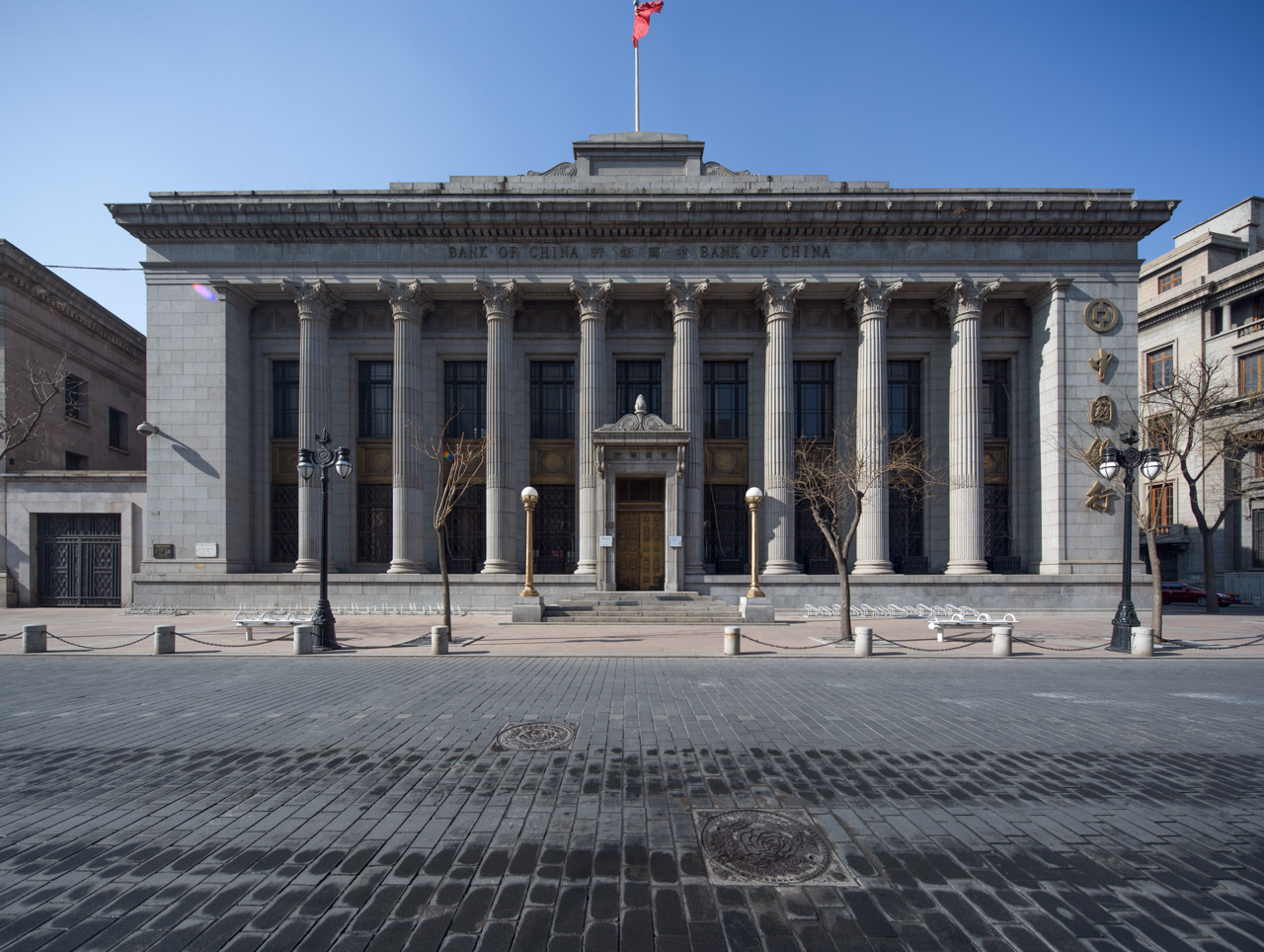
Former branch in Tianjin, now Bank of China

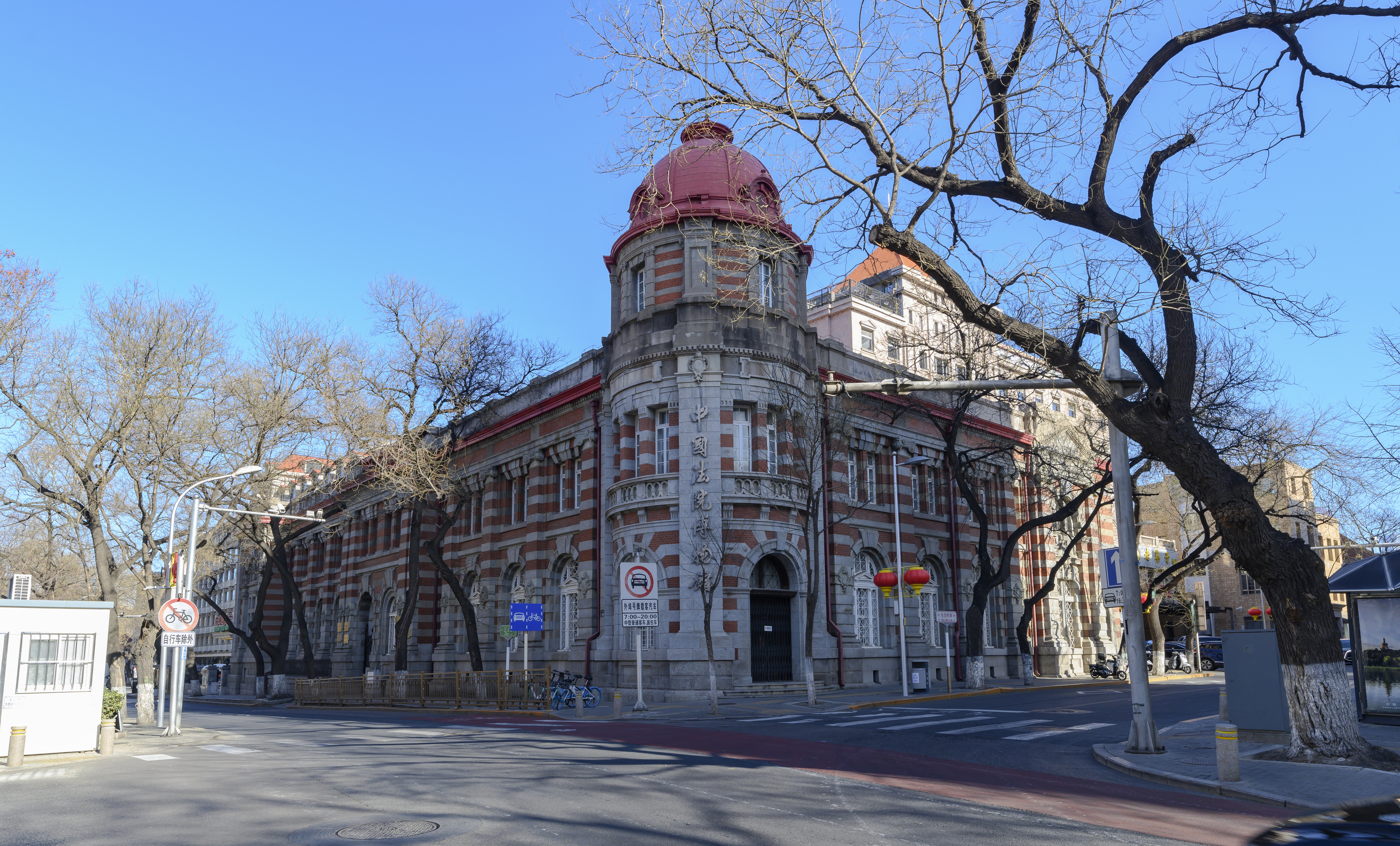
Former branch in Beijing, now China Court Museum

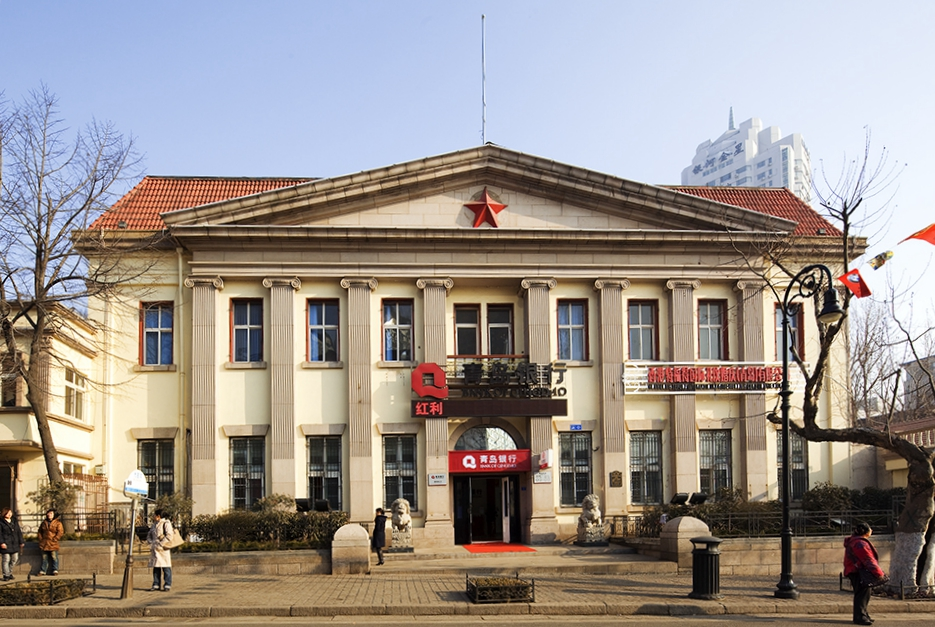
Former branch in Qingdao, now Bank of Qingdao

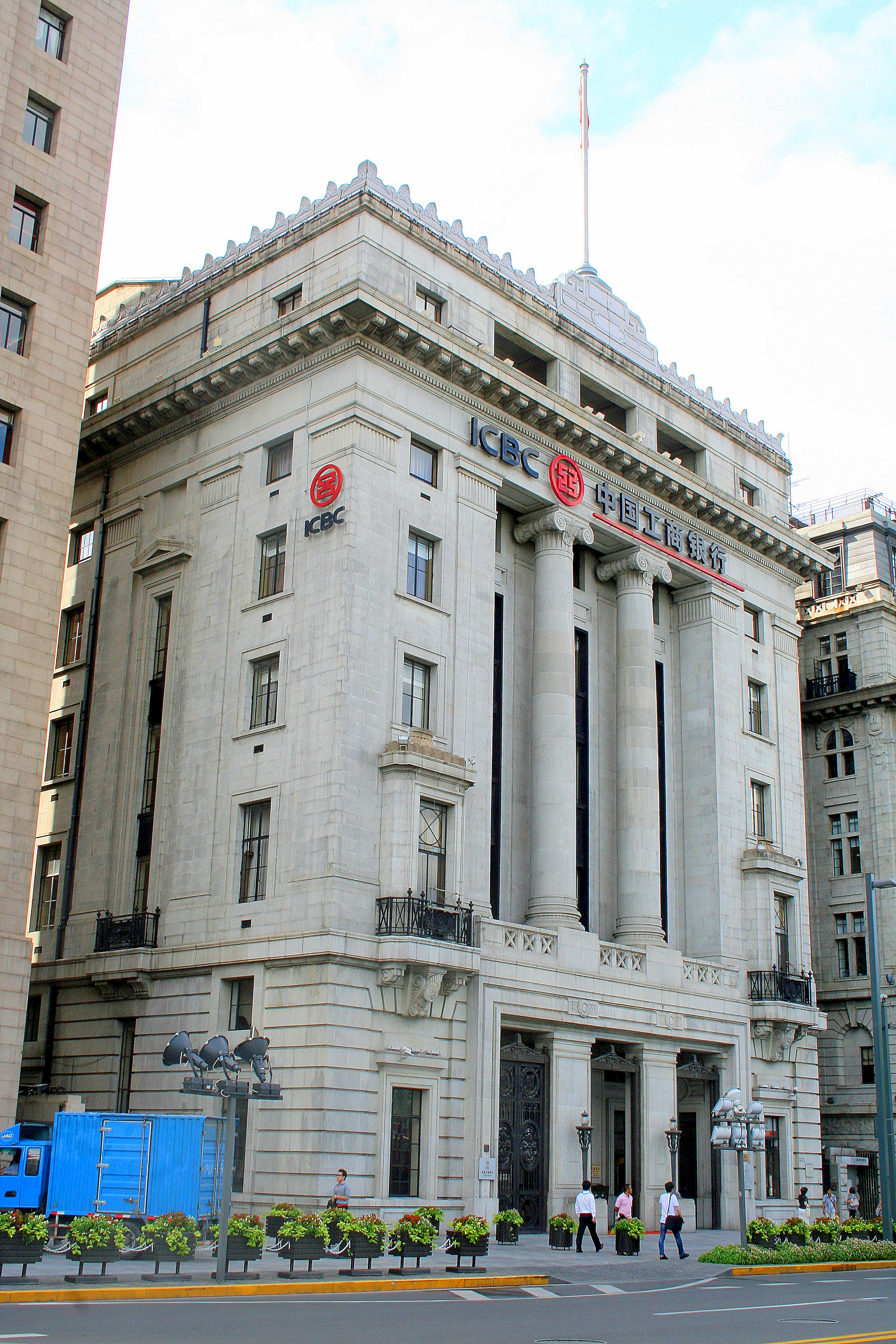
Former branch in Shanghai, now ICBC

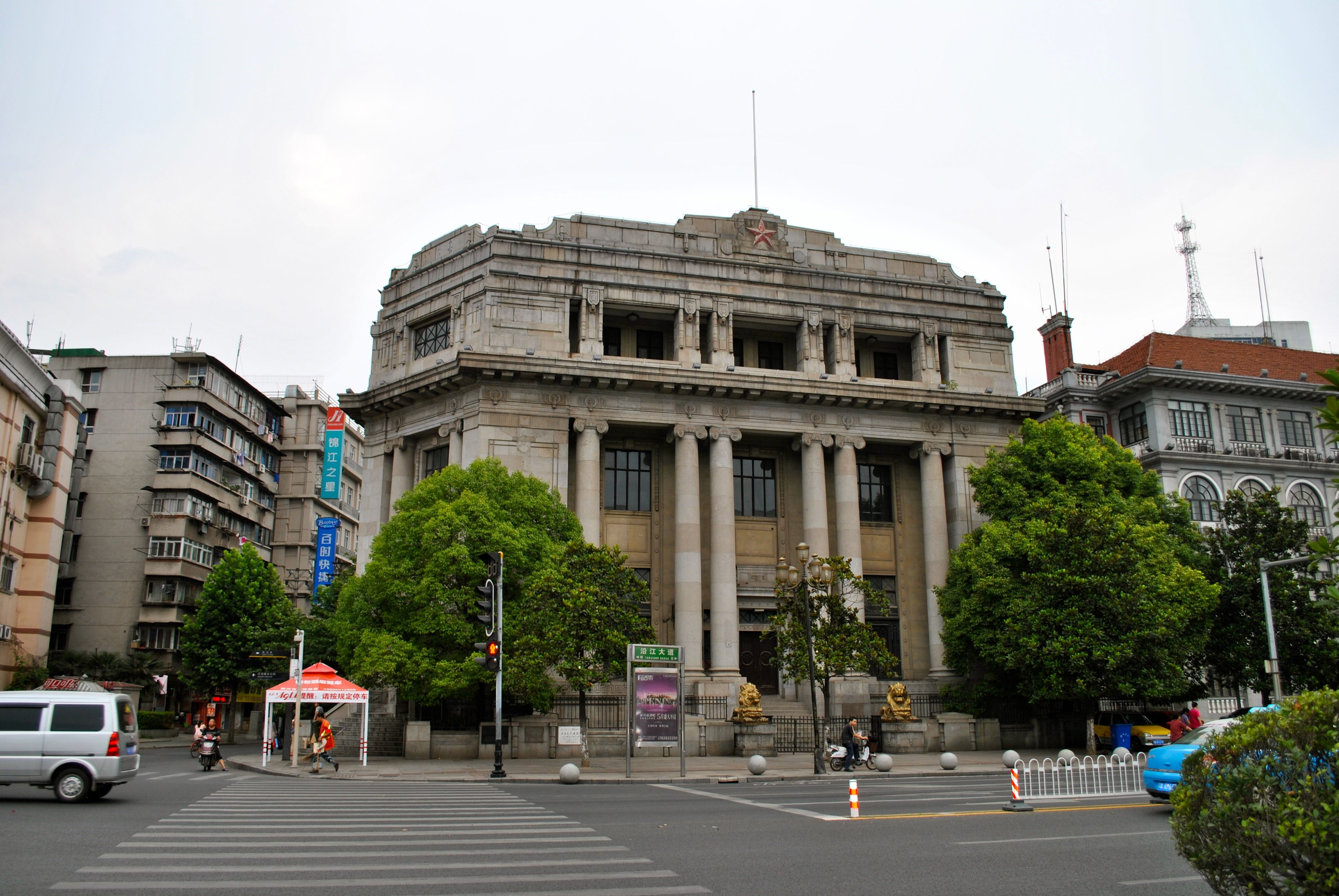
Former branch in Hankou, now Hubei International Trust Investment Corporation

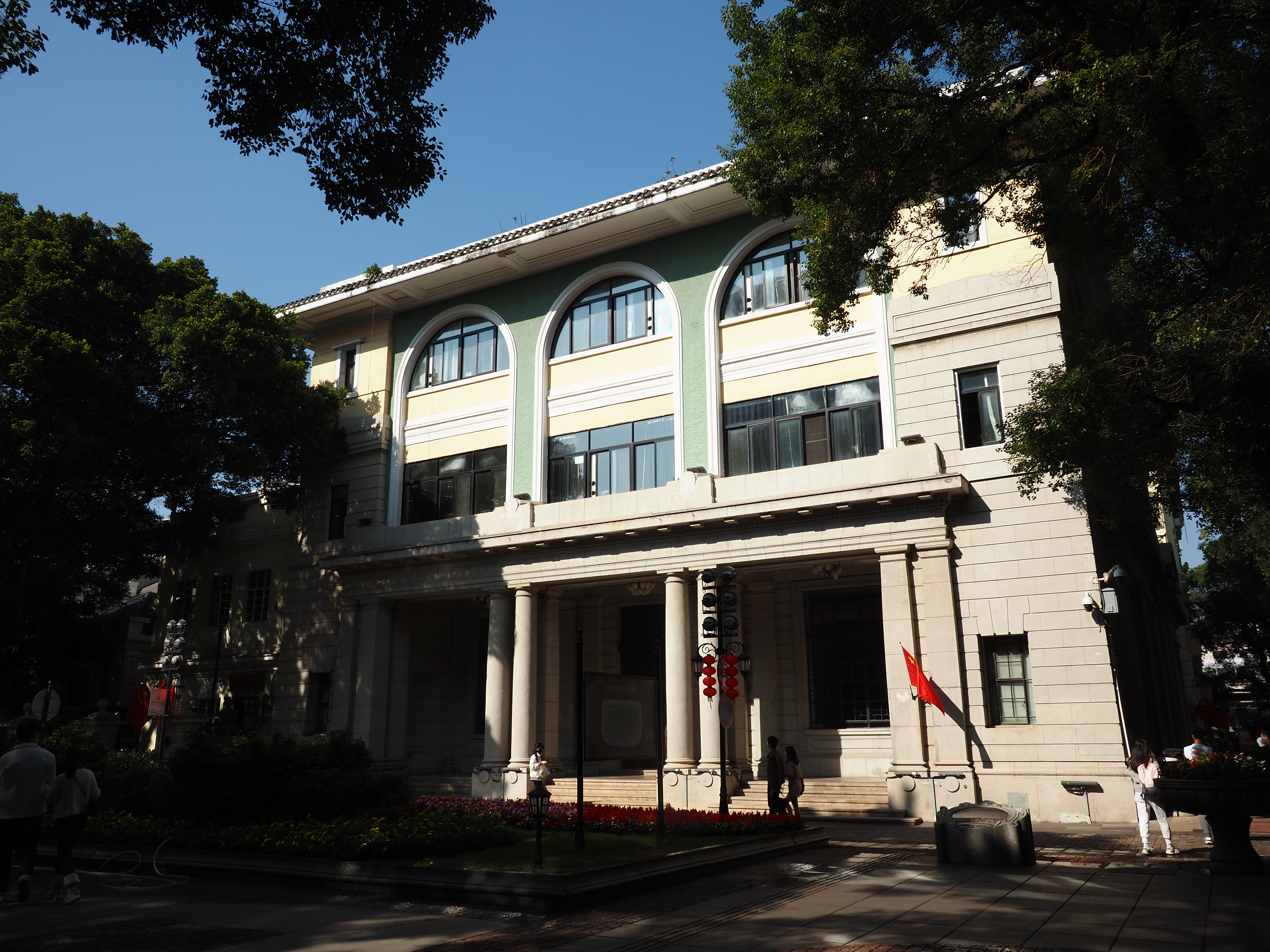
Former branch on Shamian, Guangzhou

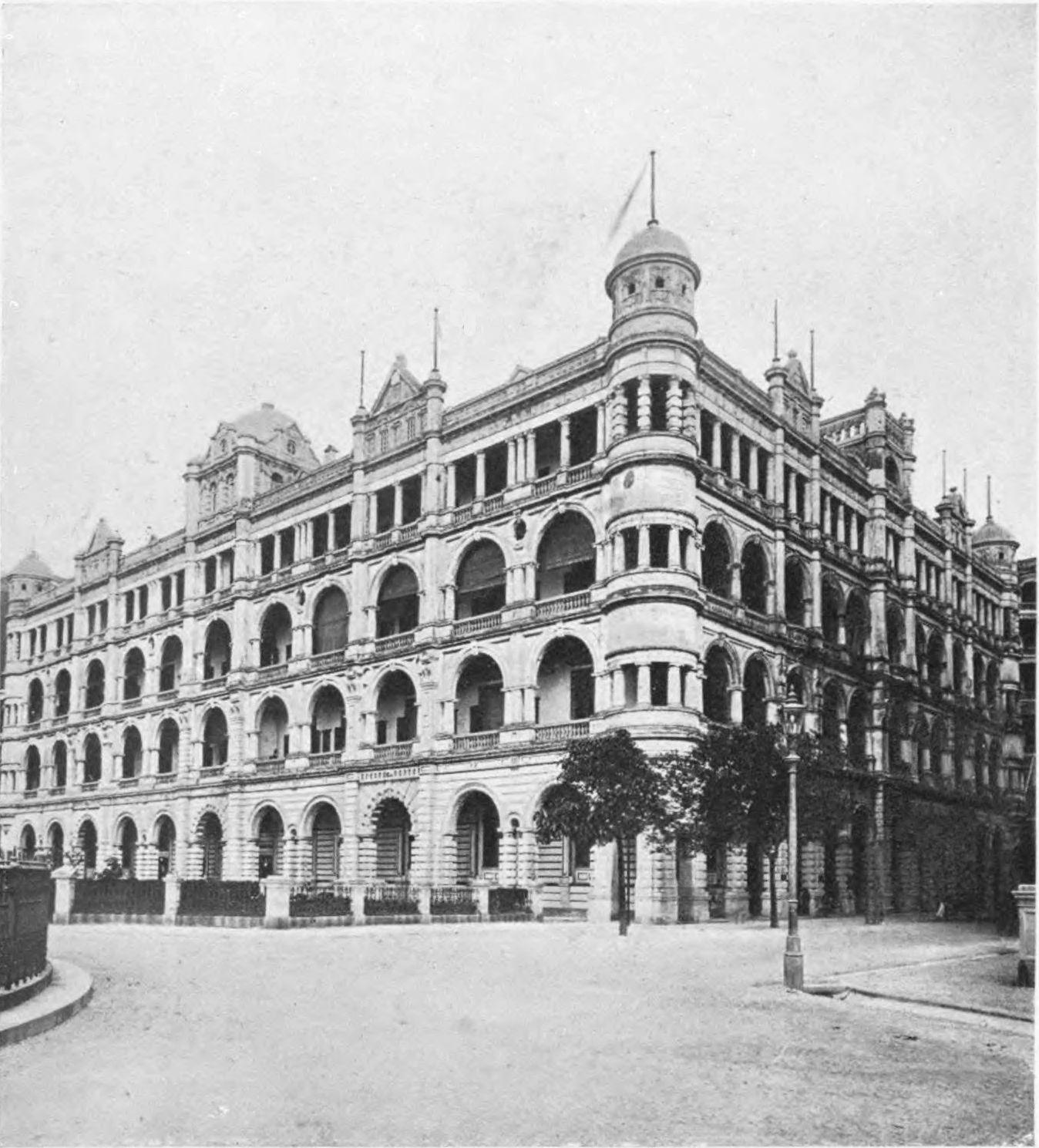
Former Prince's Building in Hong Kong, where the YSB branch was located (demolished in 1963)

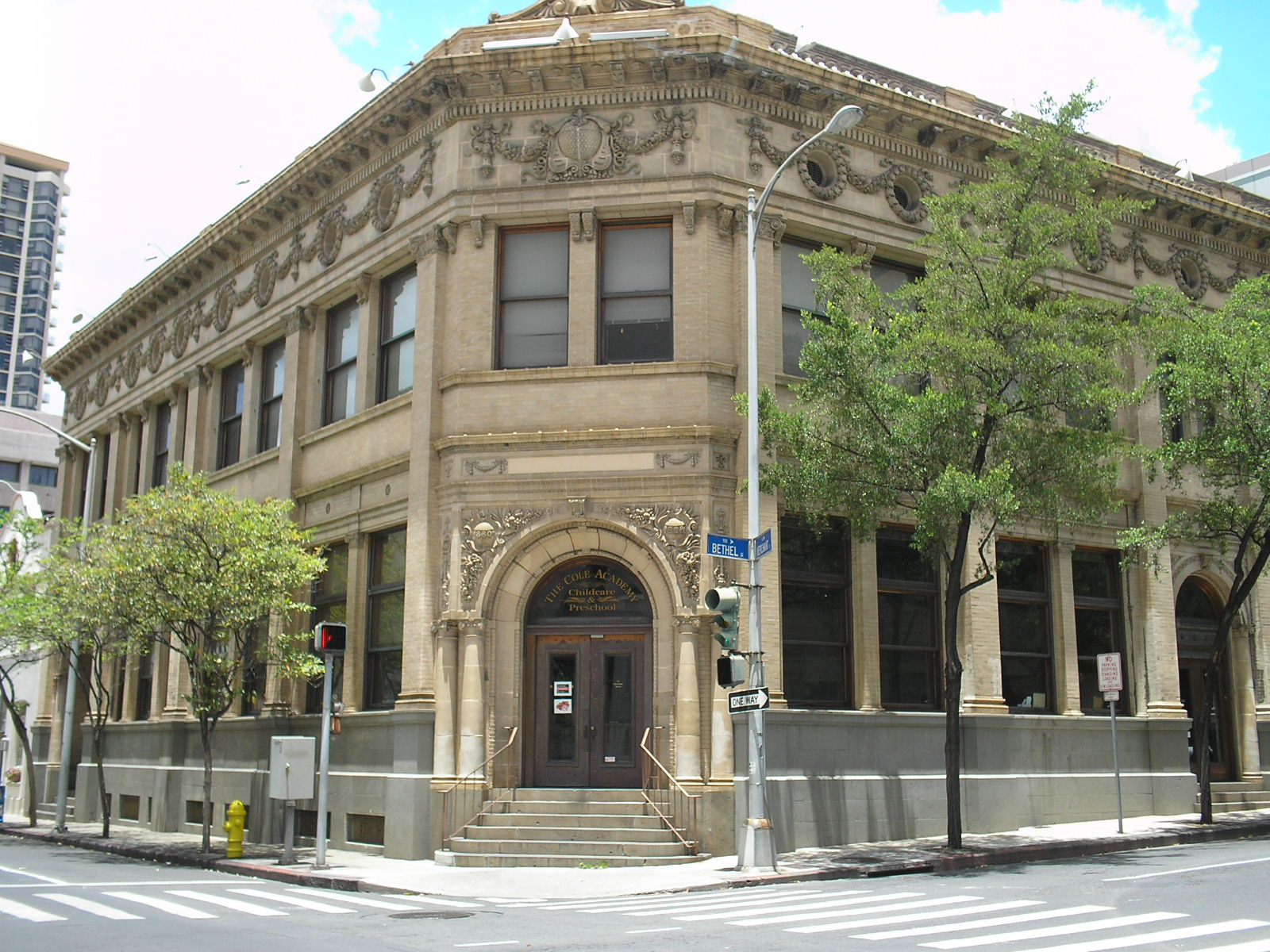
Former branch in Honolulu, now Cole Academy preschool

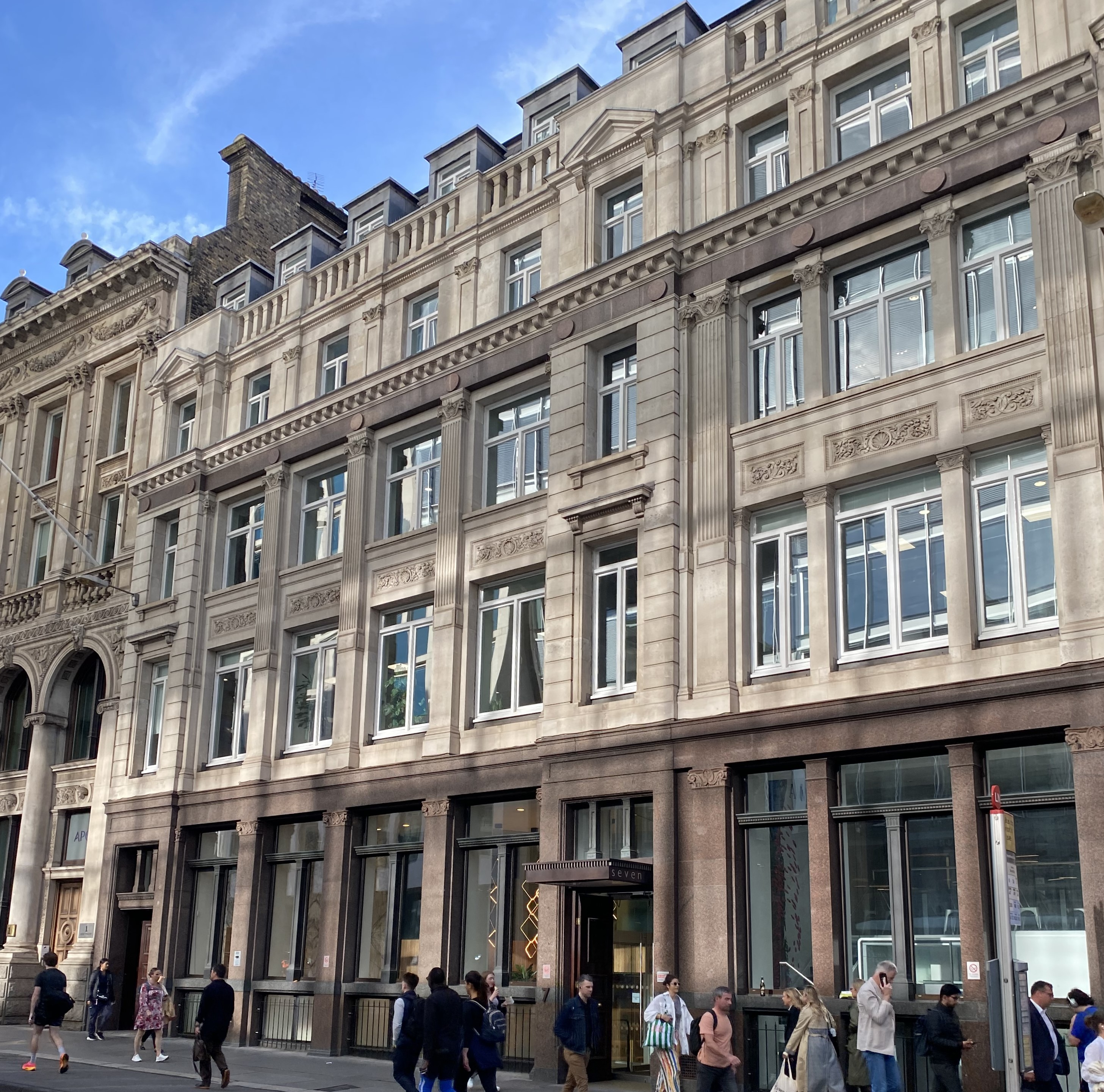
Former branch in London, Bishopsgate 7-9

== See also ==
- Bank of Taiwan
- Bank of Chōsen
- HSBC
- Banque de l'Indochine
- Deutsch-Asiatische Bank
- Russo-Chinese Bank
