= Tempah =

Tempah may refer to:

- Tempeh, a traditional soy product
- Tinie Tempah, a British rapper

== See also ==
- Tempa (disambiguation)
- Tampa (disambiguation)
