= Tampa (disambiguation) =

Tampa, Florida a city on the west coast of the U.S. state of Florida.

Tampa may also refer to:

== Places ==
=== Australia ===
- Tampa, Western Australia, an abandoned town in the goldfields

=== Romania ===
- Tâmpa (Brașov), a mountain
- Tâmpa, a village in Băcia Commune, Hunedoara County
- Tâmpa, a village in Miercurea Nirajului, Mureș County
- Tâmpa, a tributary of the Mureș in Hunedoara County
- Tâmpa, a tributary of the Gropșoarele in Prahova County

=== United States ===
- Tampa Bay area, the Tampa-St. Petersburg-Clearwater, Florida, Metropolitan Statistical Area, sometimes referred to as "Tampa Bay"
- Tampa Bay, a body of water on the west coast of Florida at the center of the Tampa Bay area
- Tampa, Kansas, a small town near the center of the U.S. state of Kansas

== Sports teams ==
- Tampa Bay Buccaneers of the National Football League
- Tampa Bay Lightning of the National Hockey League
- Tampa Bay Rays of Major League Baseball

== Transportation ==
- Tampa station (Los Angeles Metro), a bus rapid transit station in Los Angeles, California
- Tampa Union Station, a train station in Tampa, Florida
- MV Tampa, a Norwegian cargo ship
- TAMPA Cargo (Transportes Aéreos Mercantiles Panamericanos S.A.), a cargo airline based in Medellín, Colombia
- USCGC Tampa, several cutters of the United States Revenue Cutter Service and United States Coast Guard
- USS Tampa, several ships of the U.S. Navy

== Other uses ==
- Tampa (novel), a novel by Alissa Nutting published in 2013
- Tampa affair, an Australian political controversy and diplomatic dispute involving the MV Tampa in 2001
- Tampa, a genus of moths in the family Pyralidae
- "Tampa", a song by LANY from the album, LANY
- "Tampa", a song by Cico P
- University of Tampa, a private university located near downtown Tampa

== See also ==
- Tempa (disambiguation)
