= USS Satterlee =

USS Satterlee may refer to the following ships of the United States Navy:

- USS Satterlee (DD-190), a Clemson-class destroyer, commissioned in 1919 and decommissioned in 1922. She was transferred to the Royal Navy as HMS Belmont in 1940 and sunk in battle in 1942 during World War II.
- USS Satterlee (DD-626), a Gleaves-class destroyer, commissioned in 1943, served in World War II and decommissioned in 1946.
