= The Bank of Tokyo =

Japanese foreign exchange bank

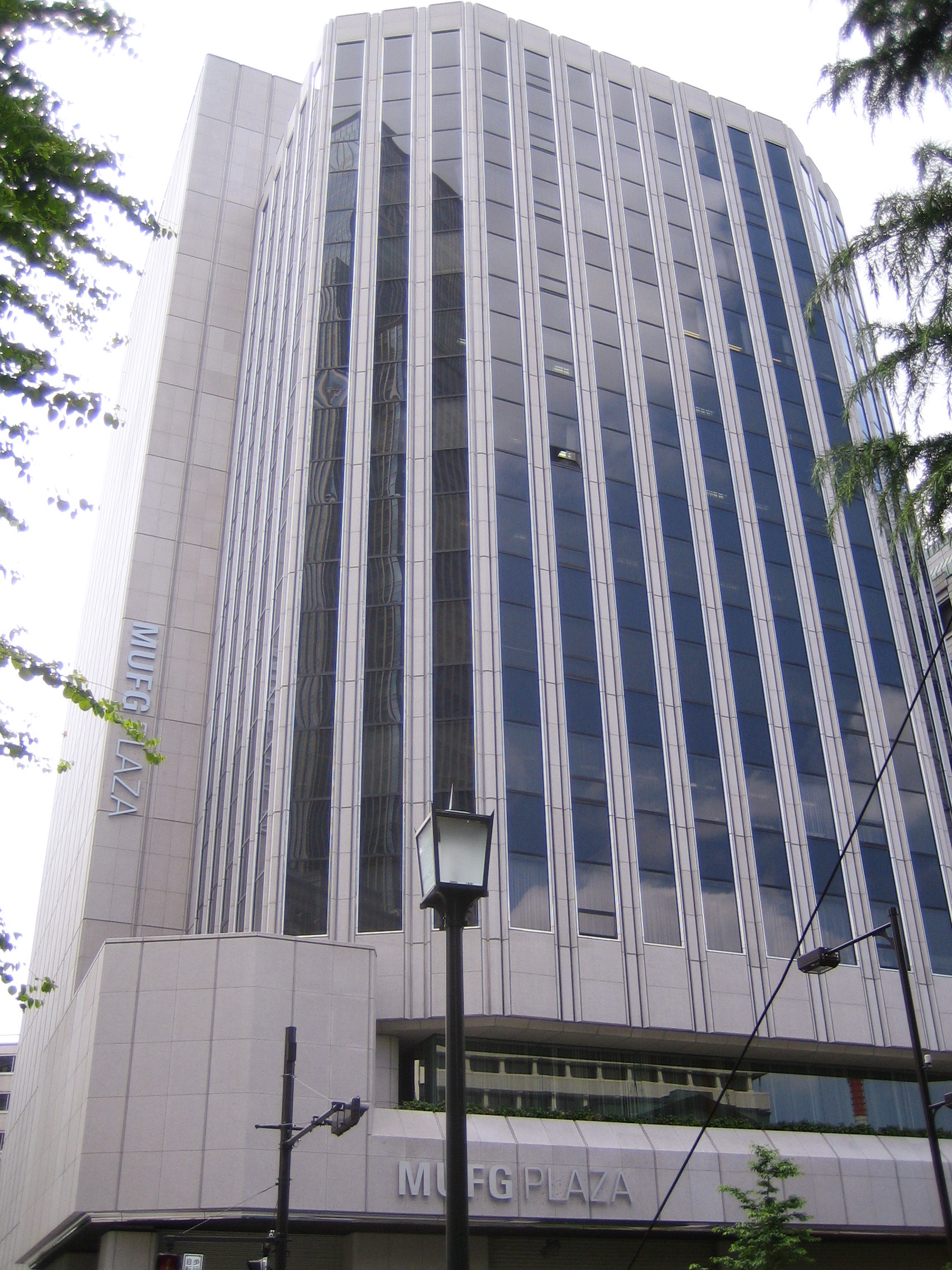
Former Bank of Tokyo headquarters, now The Bank of Tokyo-Mitsubishi UFJ Nihonbashi Branch (MUFG Plaza)

The Bank of Tokyo, Ltd. (株式会社東京銀行, Kabushiki gaisha Tōkyō Ginkō; BOT) was a Japanese foreign exchange bank that operated from 1946 to 1996. In January 1996, it merged with Mitsubishi Bank to form The Bank of Tokyo-Mitsubishi (now MUFG Bank). Its headquarters was in the Nihonbashi district of Tokyo, adjacent to the Bank of Japan.

BOT was the successor to the Yokohama Specie Bank, a state-chartered foreign exchange bank, and initially operated as an ordinary bank using the YSB's assets. In 1954 it became registered as a specialized foreign exchange bank, and closed all of its business unrelated to foreign trade. BOT became a close partner of the Ministry of Finance and the Japan Bank for International Cooperation in directing Japan's foreign trade policy during the postwar era. BOT had major operations in New York and London, and developed an early system to settle payments between Japanese yen and Chinese yuan during a time when direct foreign exchange was not possible.

Due to the peculiarly international nature of its business, BOT was the only Japanese bank that employed more foreigners than Japanese, and it had large overseas operations and a large number of non-Japanese customers. BOT was particularly active in California from around 1953. It acquired a controlling stake in San Diego–based Southern California First National Bank in 1975 and later renamed it California First Bank. In 1988, California First acquired Union Bancorp to form Union Bank (now MUFG Union Bank), one of the largest banks in California.

BOT historically operated the foreign exchange counters at Japan's international airports, including Haneda Airport and Narita International Airport, which remain under operation by its successor BTMU. Like the Long-Term Credit Bank of Japan, Nippon Credit Bank and Norinchukin Bank, BOT was permitted to issue special bonds to obtain yen funding; BTM continued this program for several years after the Tokyo-Mitsubishi merger.

The "BOT" abbreviation is still used by BOT Lease, a Mitsubishi UFJ Financial Group leasing company established by BOT in 1979.
