= USCGC Tampa =

USCGC Tampa has been the name of four cutters of the United States Revenue Cutter Service and United States Coast Guard:

- USCGC Tampa (1912), served as cutter USRC Miami in the U.S. Revenue Cutter Service 1912-1915, as Coast Guard cutter USCGC Miami 1915-1916, as Coast Guard cutter USCGC Tampa 1916-1917, and in the U.S. Navy as USS Tampa 1917-1918, and was sunk by a German submarine in 1918.
- USCGC Tampa (WPG-48), a cutter that served in the U.S. Coast Guard from 1921 to 1941, and in the U.S. Navy as USS Tampa (WPG-48) from 1941 to 1947.
- USCGC Tampa (WPG-164), a Lake-class cutter active 1947 to 1954, originally the USCGC Saranac (1930)
- USCGC Tampa (WMEC-902), a medium endurance cutter commissioned in 1984 and active today.

== See also ==
- USS Tampa
