= SM UB-91 =

German submarine

- UB-148 at sea, a U-boat similar to UB-91.

History

German Empire
- Name: UB-91
- Ordered: 6 / 8 February 1917
- Builder: AG Vulcan, Hamburg
- Cost: 3,654,000 German Papiermark
- Yard number: 107
- Launched: 6 March 1918
- Commissioned: 11 April 1918
- Fate: Surrendered 21 November 1918, broken up in 1921

General characteristics
- Class & type: Type UB III submarine
- Displacement: 510 t (500 long tons) surfaced; 640 t (630 long tons) submerged
- Length: 55.52 m (182 ft 2 in) (o/a)
- Beam: 5.76 m (18 ft 11 in)
- Draught: 3.73 m (12 ft 3 in)
- Propulsion: 2 shafts; 6-cylinder MAN-Vulcan diesel engines, 1,100 ihp (820 kW); Siemens-Schuckert electric motors, 788 ihp (588 kW)
- Speed: 13 knots (24 km/h; 15 mph) surfaced; 7.4 knots (13.7 km/h; 8.5 mph) submerged
- Range: 7,120 nmi (13,190 km; 8,190 mi) at 6 knots (11 km/h; 6.9 mph) surfaced; 55 nmi (102 km; 63 mi) at 4 knots (7.4 km/h; 4.6 mph) submerged
- Test depth: 50 m (160 ft)
- Complement: 3 officers, 31 men
- Armament: 5 × 50 cm (19.7 in) torpedo tubes (4 bow, 1 stern); 10 torpedoes; 1 × 10.5 cm (4.13 in) deck gun

Service record
- Part of: II Flotilla; 27 June – 11 November 1918
- Commanders: Kptlt. Wolf Hans Hertwig; 11 April – 11 November 1918
- Operations: 2 patrols
- Victories: 3 merchant ships sunk (13,487 GRT); 1 warship sunk (1,181 tons)

SM UB-91 was a German Type UB III submarine or U-boat in the German Imperial Navy (German: Kaiserliche Marine) during World War I. She was commissioned into the German Imperial Navy on 11 April 1918 as SM UB-91. (Note: "SM" stands for "Seiner Majestät" (English: His Majesty's) and combined with the U for Unterseeboot would be translated as His Majesty's Submarine.)

On 4 October 1918 UB-91 sank the Hirano Maru, killing among others, Yokohama Specie Bank sub-manager S. Ujie, his wife and three sons, together with bank employee Takashi Aoki and wife Sueko.

== Construction ==
She was built by AG Vulcan of Hamburg and following just under a year of construction, launched at Hamburg on 6 March 1918. UB-91 was commissioned later the same year. Like all Type UB III submarines, UB-91 carried 10 torpedoes and was armed with a 10.5 cm (4.13 in) deck gun. UB-91 would carry a crew of up to 3 officer and 31 men and had a cruising range of 7,120 nautical miles (13,190 km; 8,190 mi). UB-91 had a displacement of 510 t (500 long tons) while surfaced and 640 t (630 long tons) when submerged. Her engines enabled her to travel at 13 knots (24 km/h; 15 mph) when surfaced and 7.4 knots (13.7 km/h; 8.5 mph) when submerged.

== Service history ==
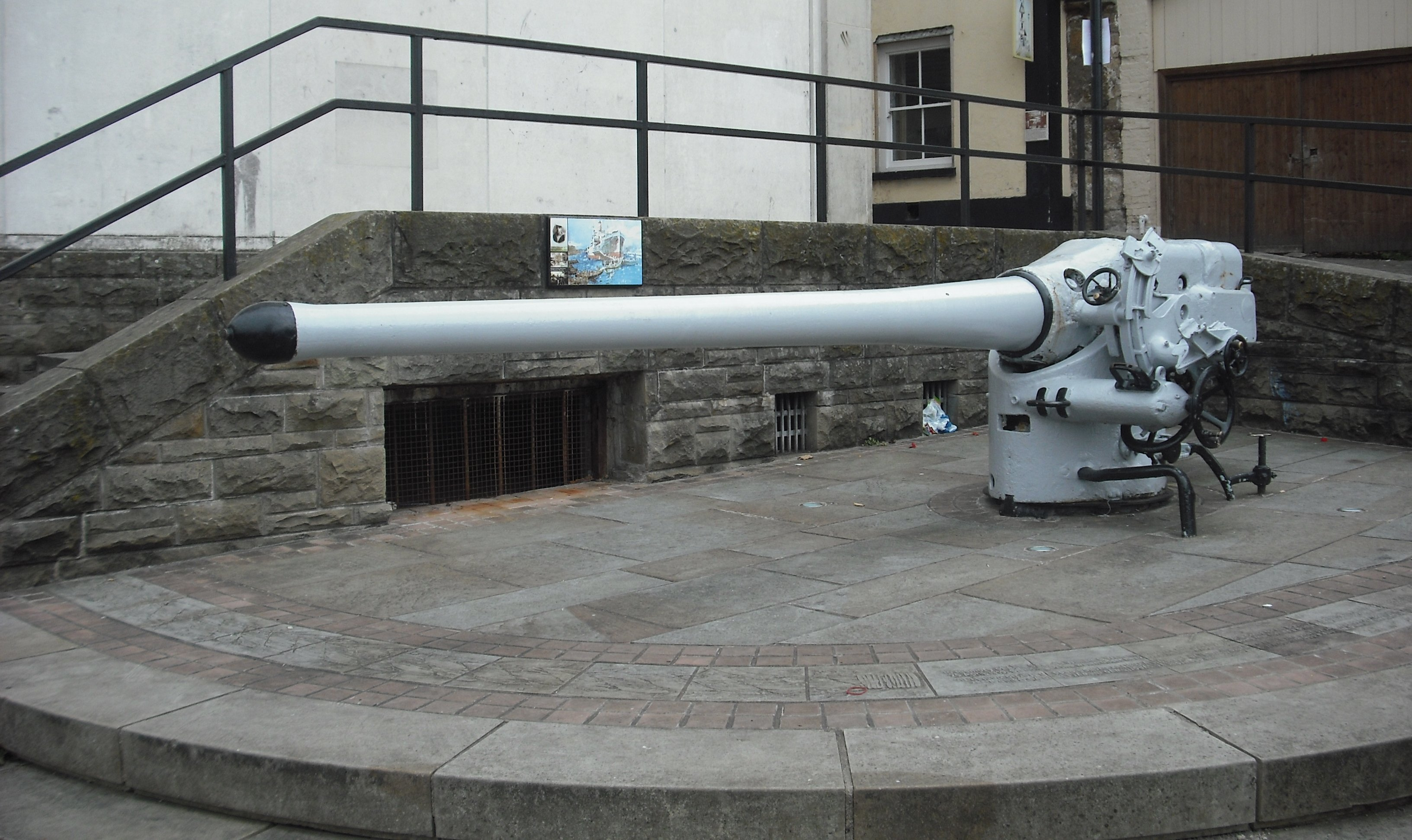
Deck gun in Chepstow today

UB-91 was surrendered to Britain on 21 November 1918 at Harwich. She toured the South Wales ports of Cardiff, Newport, Swansea, Port Talbot and was towed to Pembroke Dock, eventually being broken up in Briton Ferry in 1921. King George V presented her deck gun to the town of Chepstow by in recognition of the bravery of William Charles Williams RN VC at Gallipoli in 1915. The gun forms part of the Chepstow War Memorial.

== Summary of raiding history ==
Date	Name	Nationality	Tonnage (Note: Merchant ship tonnages are in gross register tons. Military vessels are listed by tons displacement.)	Fate
25 September 1918	Hebburn	United Kingdom	1,938	Sunk
26 September 1918	USCGC Tampa	United States Coast Guard	1,181	Sunk
28 September 1918	Baldersby	United Kingdom	3,613	Sunk
4 October 1918	Hirano Maru	Japan	7,936	Sunk

== Bibliography ==
- Bendert, Harald (2000). Die UB-Boote der Kaiserlichen Marine, 1914-1918. Einsätze, Erfolge, Schicksal (in German). Hamburg: Verlag E.S. Mittler & Sohn GmbH. ISBN 3-8132-0713-7.
- Gröner, Erich; Jung, Dieter; Maass, Martin (1991). U-boats and Mine Warfare Vessels. German Warships 1815–1945. Vol. 2. Translated by Thomas, Keith; Magowan, Rachel. London: Conway Maritime Press. ISBN 0-85177-593-4.
- Rössler, Eberhard (1979). Die deutschen U-Boote und ihre Werften: eine Bilddokumentation über den deutschen U-Bootbau; in zwei Bänden (in German). Vol. I. Munich: Bernard & Graefe. ISBN 3-7637-5213-7.
