= USS Satterlee (DD-190) =

Clemson-class destroyer

Coordinates: 42°02′N 57°18′W

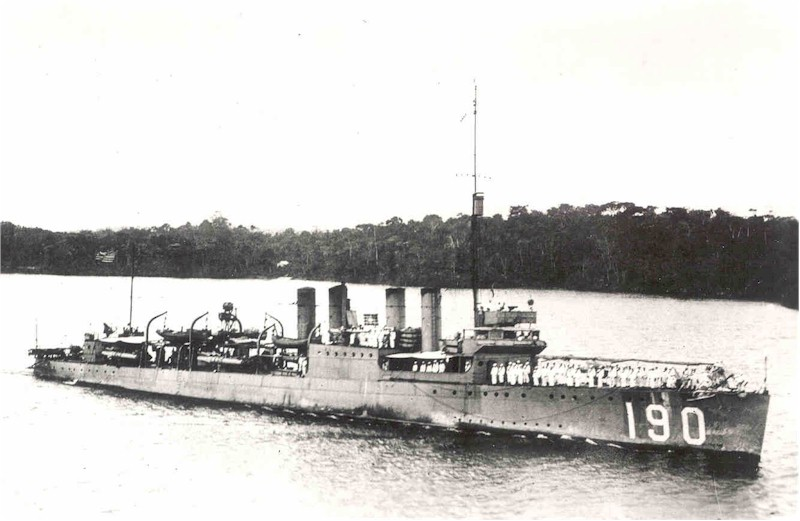
- USS Satterlee

History

United States
- Name: USS Satterlee
- Namesake: Charles Satterlee
- Builder: Newport News Shipbuilding & Dry Dock Company
- Laid down: 10 July 1918
- Launched: 21 December 1918
- Commissioned: 23 December 1919
- Decommissioned: 11 July 1922
- Recommissioned: 18 December 1939
- Decommissioned: 8 October 1940
- Stricken: 8 June 1941
- Identification: DD-190
- Fate: Transferred to UK, 8 October 1940

United Kingdom
- Name: HMS Belmont
- Acquired: 8 October 1940
- Commissioned: 8 October 1940
- Fate: Torpedoed and sunk, 31 January 1942

General characteristics
- Class & type: Clemson-class destroyer
- Displacement: 1,215 long tons (1,234 t)
- Length: 314 ft 5 in (95.83 m)
- Beam: 30 ft 11 in (9.42 m)
- Draft: 9 ft 4 in (2.84 m)
- Installed power: 26,500 shp (19,800 kW)
- Propulsion: 2 × geared steam turbines; 2 × shafts
- Speed: 35 kn (40 mph; 65 km/h)
- Range: 4,900 nmi (5,600 mi; 9,100 km) at 15 kn (17 mph; 28 km/h)
- Complement: 122 officers and enlisted
- Armament: 4 × 4 in (100 mm)/50 cal guns; 1 × 3 in (76 mm)/23 cal anti-aircraft gun; 12 × 21 inch (533 mm) torpedo tubes

USS Satterlee (DD-190) was a Clemson-class destroyer in the United States Navy, entering service in 1919. After brief service until 1922, the ship was placed in reserve. The ship was reactivated for World War II before being transferred to the Royal Navy in 1940. Renamed HMS Belmont, the destroyer was used as a convoy escort in the Battle of the Atlantic where she was torpedoed and sunk on 31 January 1942.

== Construction ==
The Clemson-class was a modified version of the previous Wickes class (itself a faster version of the Caldwell class) with more fuel, as many of the Wickes-class had poor fuel economy and hence endurance. Like the Wickes-class ships, the Clemsons had flush-decks and four funnels and were ordered in very large numbers to meet the US Navy's need for ships to counter German U-boats as well as to operate with the fleet.

Saterlee was 314 ft 4 in (95.81 m) long overall and 310 ft 0 in (94.49 m) at the waterline, with a beam of 30 ft 10 in (9.40 m) and a draft of 9 ft 10 in (3.00 m). Displacement was 1,190 long tons (1,209 t) normal and 1,308 long tons (1,329 t) full load. Four White-Forster water-tube boilers supplied steam to two sets of Westinghouse geared steam turbines. The machinery was rated at 27,000 shp (20,000 kW), giving a design speed of 35 kn (40 mph; 65 km/h). During sea trials, a speed of 34.99 kn (40.27 mph; 64.80 km/h) was reached. The ship had a designed endurance of 2,500 nmi (2,900 mi; 4,600 km) at 20 kn (23 mph; 37 km/h).

Main gun armament consisted of four 4 in (102 mm) /50 caliber guns, with one forward and one aft on the ship's centerline, and the remaining two on the ships beam. Anti-aircraft armament consisted of two 3"/23 caliber guns, while torpedo armament consisted of twelve 21 inch (533 mm) torpedo tubes, arranged in four triple mounts on the ship's beams.

Saterlee was the first ship named for Captain Charles Satterlee USCG (1875–1918), captain of the US Coast Guard cutter Tampa, who was killed when Tampa was sunk by a German submarine on 26 September 1918. The ship was laid down on 10 July 1918 at the Newport News Shipbuilding & Dry Dock Company, Newport News, Virginia shipyard and was launched on 21 December 1918. The ship was sponsored by Ms. Rebecca E. Satterlee, niece of the ship's namesake. The destroyer was commissioned on 23 December 1919.

== Service ==
=== United States Navy service ===
Satterlee joined her destroyer flotilla at Manzanillo, Cuba on 27 January 1920 and conducted training in the Caribbean until 26 April. She then carried out further trials and underwent defect rectification before rejoining her flotilla at Naval Station Newport, the naval base on Newport, Rhode Island, on 11 June. Saterlee attended that year's America's Cup yachting races off New York City from 9–26 July, and visited Miami from 2–28 August before resuming training off Newport. On 27 December that year, three of the ship's crew absconded with $72,000 which had been delivered to the ship earlier that day. The three men were subsequently arrested and convicted of the theft, being sentenced to a five year prison sentence. The destroyer joined the Atlantic Fleet at Guantanamo Bay on 10 January 1921 to take part in the fleet maneuvers which continued until 24 April. She then resumed training and upkeep along the Atlantic coast until she was decommissioned on 11 July 1922 and placed in reserve at Philadelphia.

With war breaking out in both Europe and the Far East, Satterlee was recommissioned at Philadelphia on 18 December 1939 and assigned to duty on Neutrality Patrol. She arrived in the Caribbean on 2 February 1940 for patrol duty and training. The ship departed the Caribbean on 15 April, and underwent overhaul at Norfolk, Virginia from 19 April – 5 July. She then operated along the east coast until decommissioned on 8 October.

=== Royal Navy service ===
Satterlee was transferred to the United Kingdom on the same day and served the Royal Navy as HMS Belmont, one of 50 old American destroyers exchanged for bases in British colonies in the western Atlantic.

HMS Belmont was commissioned on 8 October 1940, and sailed for Britain on 15 October. Belmont reached Belfast, Northern Ireland, on 24 October and reaching Devonport on 28 October, where she underwent a refit, completed on 25 November that year. She joined the 3rd Escort Group in the Western Approaches Command and conducted escorting duty for Atlantic convoys, broken only by a collision with a merchant ship on 22 March 1941. Repairs following this collision continued into July 1941.

In November 1941, Belmont sailed for St. John's, Newfoundland to carry out local escort duties in Canadian waters. On 30 January 1942, Belmont left Halifax, Nova Scotia, forming, together with the destroyer Firedrake, the escort for the troopships Volendam and Largs Bay as Convoy NA2 bound for the Clyde. The two destroyers were on opposite flanks of the convoy, with the troopships in line abreast. At 22.12 hr on 31 January 1942, (Note: At position 42° 02' N, 57°' 18' W according to Kemp and u-boat.net or 42.08N 57.26 W according to Hepper and Evans.) explosions were spotted near Belmont by Volendam, and the Convoy commodore ordered the convoy to alter course away from the explosions on the assumption that Belmont was engaging a submarine. When the convoy resumed its course at 22.50 hr, with no sight of or signals from Belmont, it was realised that the destroyer must have been torpedoed. Firecrest remained with the convoy rather than turning back to search for survivors, as that would have left the convoy unprotected. An air search for survivors was hampered by bad weather, and no survivors were found. Belmont had been torpedoed and sunk by the German U-boat U-82 with all 138 on board being killed. U-82 herself was sunk with all hands on 6 February 1942.
