= Satterly =

Origin
- Region of origin: Devon, England

Other names
- Variant forms: Satele, Satelee, Sateley, Sately, Saterlaye, Saterle, Saterlee, Saterlei, Satherlie, Saturlee, Saturley, Saturly, Satterlaye, Satterle, Satterlee, Satterlei, Satterleigh, Satterley, Satterly, Shatterley, Shitterley, Sittelee, Sitterlee, Soterle, Soterlee, Soterlega, Soterlegh, Soterlei, Soterleigh, Soterley, Soterly, Sotterle, Sotterlee, Sotterley, Sotterly

Satterlee, Satterley, or Satterly is a surname of English origin from Satterleigh in Devon, England.

== Distribution ==
=== United States ===
According to the 2010 United States Census, Satterly is the 23,185th most common surname in the United States, belonging to 1,100 individuals. Satterly is most common among White (97.45%) individuals.

Year	Rank	Number of occurrences	Proportion per 100,000	Cumulative proportion per 100,000	Non-Hispanic White Only	Non-Hispanic Black Only	Non-Hispanic Asian and Pacific Islander Only	Non-Hispanic American Indian and Alaskan Native Only	Non-Hispanic of Two or More Races	Hispanic Origin
1990	26,087	-	-	-	-	-	-	-	-	-
2000	22,612	1,061	0.39	76,239.88	98.59%	-	-	-	-	-
2010	23,185	1,100	0.37	76,688.14	97.45%	-	0.64%	0%	1.27%	-

== People ==
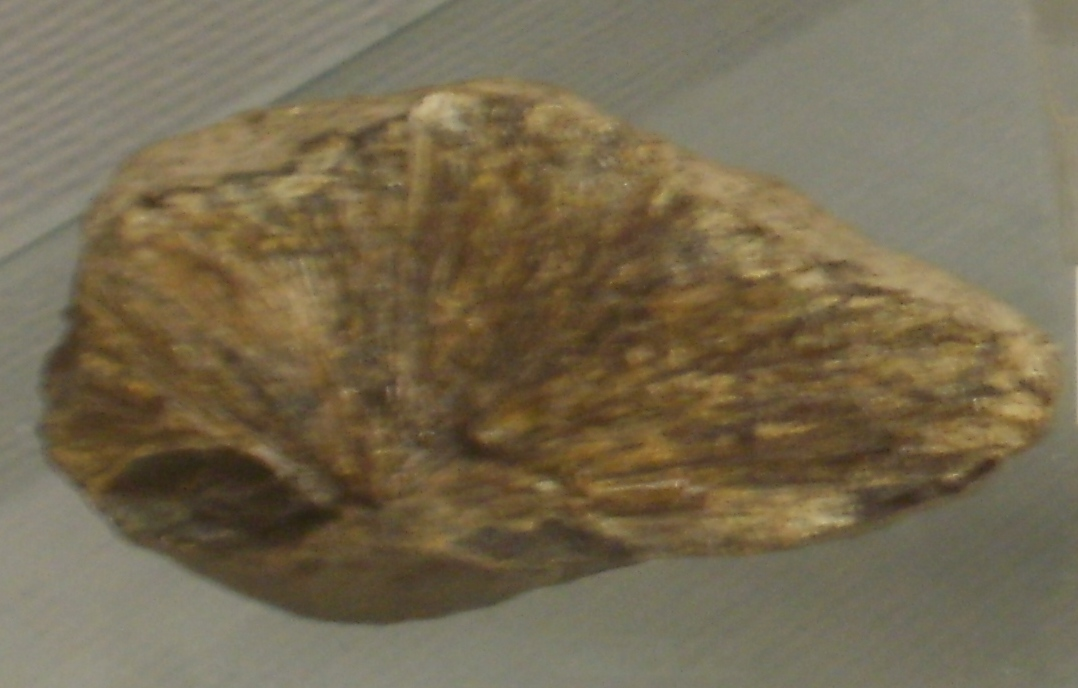
Satterlyite was named after Canadian geologist Jack Satterly

- Jack Satterly, Canadian geologist and discoverer of satterlyite in or before 1978.
- Jessica Satterley (born 1981), known as Jessica Garlick, Welsh pop singer
- Benjamin Satterley (born 1986), known as Pac, wrestler
- Nigel Satterley, founder of Australian property development company Satterley

=== Fictional characters ===
- Mrs. Satterly, 1959 British thriller film Jet Storm
- Roy Satterly, 2007 American television natural horror film Maneater
