= Tempa (disambiguation) =

Tempa Recordings is a British garage and dubstep music label.

Tempa may also refer to:

== Places ==
- Tempa, West Virginia, unincorporated community in Summers County, West Virginia, United States
- Tempa, Nepal, village and Village Development Committee in Khotang District in the Sagarmatha Zone of eastern Nepal
- Tempa, Estonia, village in Pühalepa Parish, Hiiu County, Estonia

== People ==
- Tempa Ndah (born 1973), Beninese football referee
- Tempa Tsering (born 1950), Tibetan politician

== See also ==
- Tampa (disambiguation)
