= Bank of Qingdao =

Chinese banking company

Bank of Qingdao Company Limited
- Native name: 青岛银行股份有限公司
- Company type: Joint stock bank
- Traded as: SEHK: 3866
- Industry: Banking and Finance
- Founded: 15 November 1996; 29 years ago
- Headquarters: Qingdao, China
- Key people: Guo Shaoquan; Chairman; Wang Lin; President and Director
- Products: Consumer Banking; Corporate Banking; Mortgages
- Revenue: ▲US$0.43 billion (June 2016)
- Total assets: ▲US$30.05 billion (June 2016)
- Total equity: ▲US$2.48 billion (June 2016)
- Number of employees: 3,023
- Website: Homepage

Bank of Qingdao Company Limited (simplified Chinese: 青岛银行: Qīngdǎo yínháng, traditional Chinese: 青島銀行) is a provider of retail and corporate banking services in Shandong province, headquarters are in Qingdao, China. Bank of Qingdao is regulated by the People's Bank of China, the nation's central bank.

== Overview ==
As of 30 June 2015, the total asset valuation of the bank was approximately US$24.54 billion, with shareholder's equity of about US$1.76 billion, 3,023 employees and a branch network of eighty six branches in nine cities and sixty one sub-branches.

In May 2016, the US based Forbes magazine ranked Bank of Qingdao at 1,791 in its list of The World's Biggest Public Companies, 1,790 in Profit and 826 in total assets. The bank was among top 300 Asian banks (ranking 172) and China's top 500 service enterprises in 2015.

== History ==
Bank of Qingdao was founded on 15 November 1996 as Qingdao City Cooperative Bank (青岛城市合作银行). This was by way of merger of 21 urban cooperatives in Qingdao. In 1998, the bank's name was changed to Qingdao commercial Bank (青岛市商业银行) so as to target a larger client base. The shareholders of these cooperatives became the founder shareholders in the newly developed bank.

In 2001, Haier took majority control of the bank after six of its subsidiaries acquired stake in the bank. This acquisition was made by Haier through its subsidiaries as the Chinese laws did not allow a non-financial institution to own more than ten percent of a bank. Haier's investment enabled the bank to invest in the SilverLake system. This made Qingdao Commercial Bank the first institution in China to adopt the system. The bank received investment from Qingdao Conson in 2005.

In 2008, Italy based Intesa Sanpaolo acquired a twenty percent stake in the bank for $135m. This was followed by an investment of €25.4m from Rothschild Continuation Holdings for a five percent stake in the bank. These acquisitions made ISP and Rothschild the first foreign investors in the bank and were part of a broader fundraising that more than doubled the bank's capital. In 2008, the bank's was rebranded to Bank of Qingdao and it expanded its operations outside Qingdao.

In November 2015, Bank of Qingdao listed H shares on the Hong Kong Stock Exchange after a successful initial public offering. The bank managed to raise US$607 million in the public offering. The offer was undersubscription due to a volatile market. The IPO was underwritten by Goldman Sachs and CITIC Securities with BNP Paribas, Banca IMI (Intesa Sanpaolo's investment bank) and Rothschild as part of the transaction advisors. The IPO also saw the shares of the major shareholders listed on the HKSE making it possible for them to exit the venture through the stock exchange.

== Ownership ==
The shares of the stock of Bank of Qingdao are traded on the Hong Kong Stock Exchange, under the ticker: 3866. As of June 2015, prior to the IPO, the shareholding in the bank's stock was as depicted in the table below:

Bank of Qingdao Stock Ownership
Rank	Name of Owner	Percentage Ownership
1	Haier and Associate Companies	26.10
2	Intesa Sanpaolo of Italy	20.00
5	Qingdao Conson	17.13
5	Rothschild Continuation Holdings	3.18
5	Other	33.59
	Total	100.00

== Governance ==
Bank of Qingdao is governed by a twelve-person board of directors led by Shaoquan Guo as the chairman and Lin Wang as the President and Executive Director. Other board members include Mr. Yang Fengjiang, Ms. Lu Lan, Mr. Zhou Yunjie, Mr. Rosario Strano, Ms. Tan Lixia, Mr. Marco Mussita, Mr. Deng Youcheng, Mr. Calvin Choi, Mr. Wong Tin Yau Kelvin, Mr. Chen Hua, Ms. Dai Shuping, Mr. Simon Cheung, and Ms. Fang Qiaoling.

== See also ==
- Banking in China
