= Hirano Maru =

Japanese transport ship (1908–1918)

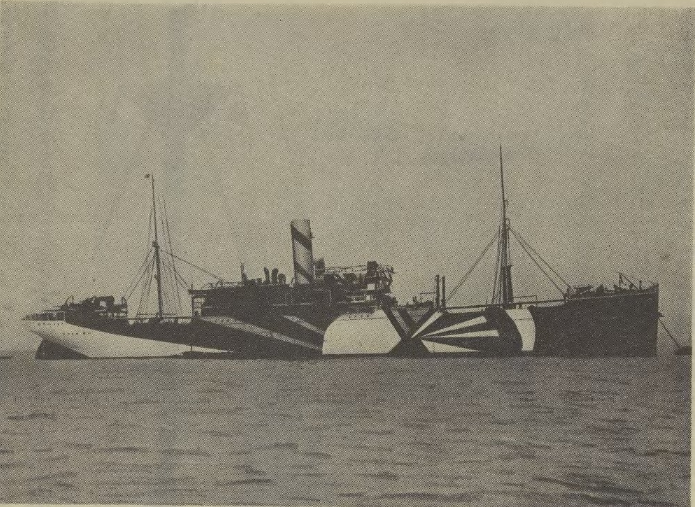
- Hirano Maru in dazzle camouflage during the First World War

History

Japan
- Name: Hirano Maru
- Owner: Nippon Yūsen Kaisha
- Operator: NYK Line
- Port of registry: Tokyo
- Route: Yokohama – Liverpool
- Builder: Mitsubishi Dockyard and Engine Works, Nagasaki
- Maiden voyage: 1908
- Fate: Sunk on 4 October 1918

General characteristics
- Tonnage: 8,520 GRT; 5,283 NRT
- Length: 473 ft 9 in (144.40 m)
- Beam: 54 ft 7 in (16.64 m)
- Depth: 31 ft 3 in (9.53 m)
- Propulsion: Two screws driven by 6 boilers and a 6-cylinder triple expansion 973 hp (726 kW) engine
- Capacity: 320 passengers and crew on final voyage

Hirano Maru was a Japanese transport ship operated by the Nippon Yusen Kaisha shipping line. She was built by the Mitsubishi Dockyard and Engine Works in Nagasaki, Japan, and operated on the Yokohama-Liverpool route from 1908. On 4 October 1918 she was travelling through the Celtic Sea, having just left Liverpool, when she was torpedoed by the German submarine UB-91. She sank with the loss of 291 of her 320 passengers and crew. Memorials to those who died were erected in Welsh churchyards where some of the dead were buried.

== Construction and operation ==
The Hirano Maru was built by the Mitsubishi Dockyard and Engine Works in Nagasaki, Japan, for the Nippon Yusen Kaisha (NYK) shipping line. Her hull was made of steel and was divided by seven bulkheads. Hirano Maru measured 473 feet 9 inches (144.40 m) in length, 54 feet 7 inches (16.64 m) in breadth and 31 feet 3 inches (9.53 m) in depth. She had a gross register tonnage of 8,520 and a net register tonnage of 5,283. Hirano Maru had a passenger deck measuring 61 feet (19 m) in length, a boat deck measuring 176 feet (54 m) and a forecastle measuring 64 feet (20 m). She was propelled by two screws driven by 6 boilers and a 6-cylinder triple expansion 973 horsepower (726 kW) steam engine.

Hirano Maru was delivered to NYK in 1908 and sailed on the Yokohama-Liverpool route. Her port of registry was Tokyo. In 1913, Ceylonese Buddhist writer Anagarika Dharmapala travelled on Hirano Maru during his return to Ceylon after visiting philanthropist Mary Robinson Foster.

== Sinking ==
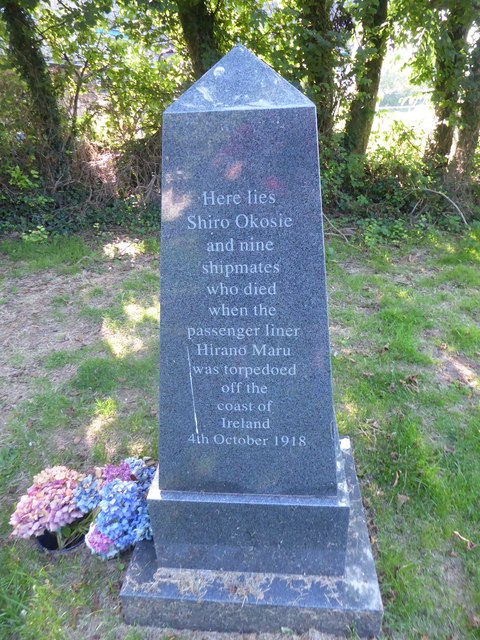
Memorial at Angle

During the First World War (1914–1918) Japan was a British ally; during this time the Hirano Maru continued to sail on the Yokohama-Liverpool route. On her final outbound trip in 1918 J. R. D. Tata, then a child, travelled with his family from Japan to Colombo, Ceylon. After reaching Britain the Hirano Maru departed Liverpool bound for Yokohama on 1 October, captained by British officer Hector Fraser. Fraser had 25 years of service with NYK and had been appointed to the Order of the Rising Sun by the Japanese government for his work during the First Sino-Japanese War and the Russo-Japanese War.

On her final voyage Hirano Maru carried 320 people, around two-thirds of whom were crew and the remainder passengers (including many children), as well as a mixed cargo. Convoys were used during the war as a means of protecting merchantmen from attack by German U-boats and Hirano Maru joined convoy OE-23 on 2 October. Her next port of call was due to be Durban in South Africa. The convoy was escorted by the USS Sterett, an American destroyer captained by Commander Allan S. Farquhar.

On 4 October the convoy was in the Celtic Sea at 51°12′N 7°0′W, around 200 miles (320 km) south of Ireland, travelling through a storm. The convoy was sighted by UB-91 at 05:05 and her commander, Captain Wolf Hans Hartwig, ordered two torpedoes to be fired at the Hirano Maru. The liner sank within seven minutes, too quick to launch her lifeboats and those that did float off were smashed against the hull by the storm; hundreds of survivors were swept into the sea.

Sterett hove to at 7:05 to rescue survivors but had to abandon the attempt when further torpedoes were spotted. Farquhar launched an attack on UB-91 with depth charges but she dived to lower depths and made her escape. The delay to the rescue caused by this attack caused most of the survivors to succumb to hypothermia. The rescue was called off at 7.58, with just 29 survivors recovered. Those who died included Captain Fraser and Japanese officer Lieutenant-Colonel Shintaro Yamamoto. The sinking was the greatest loss of life on a Japanese commercial vessel during the war. Many of the victims have no known grave but 11 bodies were washed up in Pembrokeshire, Wales, and buried in local cemeteries and others washed ashore in Ireland.

The German U-boat campaign ended on 20 October, with the submarines recalled to Germany for service with the fleet. The war ended with an Allied victory on 11 November. Farquhar was recognised for his work with the convoys and attempt to rescue survivors of the Hirano Maru by the award of the Navy Cross. NYK had a replacement vessel, also named Hirano Maru in service by 1922.

== Memorials ==
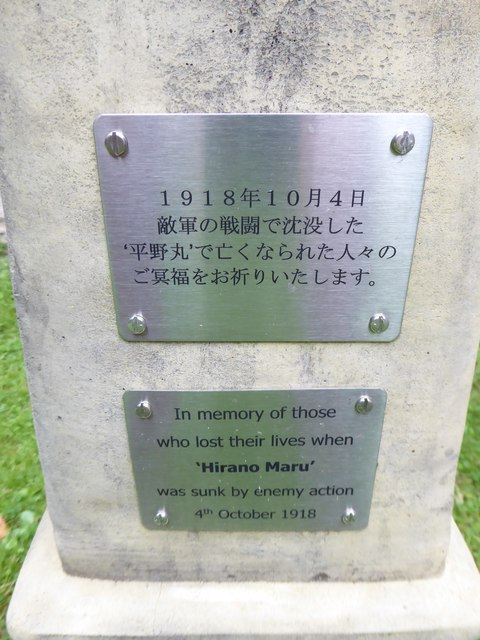
Detail of plaques on the St Ishmaels memorial

A wooden memorial with an inscription in Japanese to ten unknown sailors was erected in the Churchyard of St Mary's in Angle, Pembrokeshire, 11 days after the sinking to mark their graves. The memorial had rotted away by 2018 and was replaced by a granite memorial, paid for by local residents, in time for the centenary of the sinking. The new memorial includes an inscription in Japanese, Welsh and English to Shiro Okosie and nine unknown shipmates. It was unveiled by Prince Richard, Duke of Gloucester at an event attended by staff of the Japanese embassy in London, descendants of those lost in the sinking and representatives of NYK.

Another memorial to those who died in the sinking stands in the churchyard at St Ishmaels in Pembrokeshire. It is a stone obelisk with flowers on the plinth and plaques in English and Japanese. Signalman Alec John Lee of the Royal Naval Volunteer Reserve, who was assigned to the Hirano Mau and killed in the sinking, is buried at Milford Haven cemetery in a grave maintained by the Commonwealth War Graves Commission. Captain Fraser is named on London's Tower Hill Memorial to missing Commonwealth merchant seaman.

UB-91 survived the war to surrender to the British at Harwich after the armistice. The submarine was afterwards sent, under a British crew, on a fundraising tour of Welsh ports. In 1921 she was broken up for scrap at Briton Ferry in South Wales. Her deck gun was installed as part of the war memorial at Chepstow, Monmouthshire.
