= Tempa, West Virginia =

- Unincorporated community
- Location within West Virginia Location within the United States
- Coordinates: 37°43′30″N 80°45′17″W
- Country: United States
- State: West Virginia
- County: Summers
- Elevation: 2,838 ft (865 m)
- Time zone: UTC-5 (Eastern (EST))
  - Summer (DST): UTC-4 (EDT)
- Area codes: 304 & 681
- GNIS feature ID: 1549954

Tempa is an unincorporated community in Summers County, West Virginia, United States. Tempa is northwest of Hinton and east of Alderson.

The community probably derives its name from the Vale of Tempe, in Greece.
