= USS Tampa =

USS Tampa may refer to one of these ships of the U.S. Navy:

- USS Tampa (1912), formerly the U.S. Revenue Cutter Service cutter USRC Miami (1912–1915), as U.S. Coast Guard Cutter USCGC Miami (1915–1916), and as U.S. Coast Guard Cutter USCGC Tampa (1916–1917), transferred to U.S. Navy control in 1917; sunk by a German submarine in 1918
- USS Tampa (WPG-48), the U.S. Coast Guard Cutter USCGC Tampa from 1921 to 1941, and served in the U.S. Navy from 1941 to 1947
