= USS Satterlee (DD-626) =

US Navy Gleaves-class destroyer in service 1943–1946

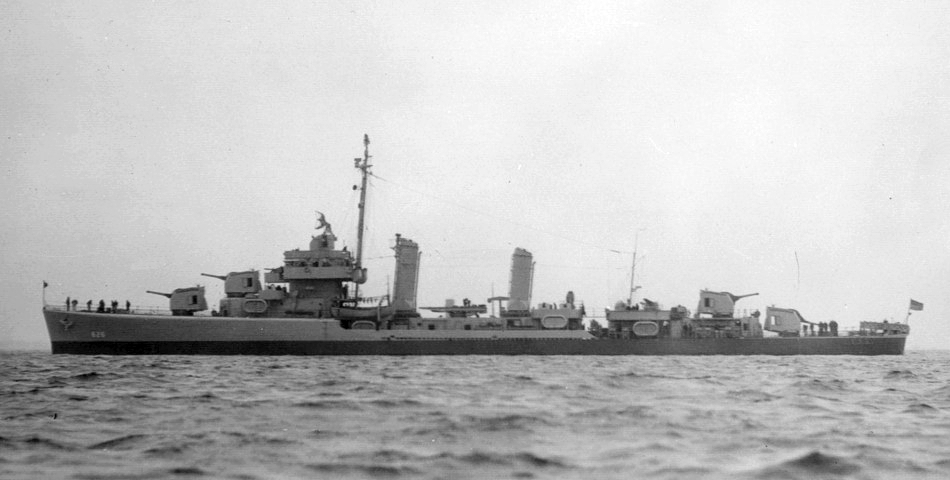
- USS Satterlee (DD-626) off Boston in September 1943

History

United States
- Name: Satterlee
- Namesake: Charles Satterlee
- Builder: Seattle-Tacoma Shipbuilding Corporation
- Laid down: 10 September 1941
- Launched: 17 July 1942
- Commissioned: 1 July 1943
- Decommissioned: 16 March 1946
- Stricken: 1 December 1970
- Fate: Sold 8 May 1972 and; broken up for scrap

General characteristics
- Class & type: Gleaves-class destroyer
- Displacement: 1,630 tons
- Length: 348 ft 3 in (106.15 m)
- Beam: 36 ft 1 in (11.00 m)
- Draft: 11 ft 10 in (3.61 m)
- Installed power: 50,000 shp (37,000 kW); 4 boilers;
- Propulsion: 2 propellers
- Speed: 37.4 knots (69 km/h)
- Range: 6,500 nmi (12,000 km; 7,500 mi) at 12 kn (22 km/h; 14 mph)
- Complement: 16 officers, 260 enlisted
- Armament: 4 × 5 in (127 mm)/38 caliber DP guns; 4 × 40 mm (1.6 in) guns (2×2); 7 × 20 mm (0.79 in) (7×1) AA guns, 5 × 21 in (533 mm) torpedo tubes (5 Mark 15 torpedoes); 6 × depth charge projectors, 2 × depth charge tracks

USS Satterlee (DD-626) was a Gleaves-class destroyer in the United States Navy during World War II. She is the second Navy ship named for United States Coast Guard Captain Charles Satterlee.

Satterlee was laid down on 10 September 1941 by the Seattle-Tacoma Shipbuilding Corp., Seattle, Washington and launched on 17 July 1942; sponsored by Miss Rebecca E. Satterlee, niece of Capt. Satterlee. The ship was commissioned on 1 July 1943.

== Service history ==
Satterlee escorted the British aircraft carrier, HMS Victorious, from the Western Seaboard to the Atlantic coast, where the new destroyer joined the U.S. Atlantic Fleet on 26 August 1943. After two convoy escort voyages to Casablanca, and training out of Casco Bay, Maine, she escorted the battleships Texas and Arkansas to Belfast, Northern Ireland, in April 1944.

In the first week of May 1944, Satterlee underwent training for a special mission assigned to her for the Normandy landings. She was to support a crack unit of 200 Army Rangers in eliminating a German gun battery at Pointe du Hoc which commanded the Omaha landing beaches. After escorting minesweepers to the beach area on the night of 5 and 6 June, she commenced pre-arranged fire on Pointe du Hoc at 05:48, 6 June. As the Rangers landed, she broke up enemy units attempting to oppose them from the top of the cliff.

Although the Rangers found that the battery's guns had been removed before the landings, German resistance was stiff, and Satterlee provided gunfire support for the rest of the day. Satterlee remained off the Normandy beaches for the next forty days, and then joined the invasion force which arrived off Saint-Tropez, southern France, on 15 August 1944. Here she helped repel a night attack of five German motor torpedo boats, sinking one from which she rescued 12 survivors.

Satterlee returned to the east coast in October 1944 for training at Casco Bay. In January and February 1945, she escorted the cruiser Quincy, with President Franklin D. Roosevelt embarked, on the Norfolk–Bermuda portion of his trip to and from the Yalta Conference. She next sailed for the Pacific, arriving at Pearl Harbor on 16 May 1945 for duty as a gunnery school ship. She also provided escort for the aircraft carriers Saratoga, Hancock, and Wasp during night and day flight operations off Hawaii.

On 4 July, Satterlee left Pearl Harbor and commenced air-sea rescue patrol duty between Saipan and Okinawa and performed this duty for the rest of the war and the initial months of the occupation. On 9 November, she began her trip back to the United States for inactivation.

Satterlee was decommissioned on 16 March 1946 and placed in reserve at Charleston, South Carolina. She was struck from the Navy list on 1 December 1970.

Satterlee received two battle stars for her World War II service. Henry Fonda also served on the ship, as a Quartermaster 3rd Class.
