= USCGC Tampa (1912) =

US Coast Guard ship

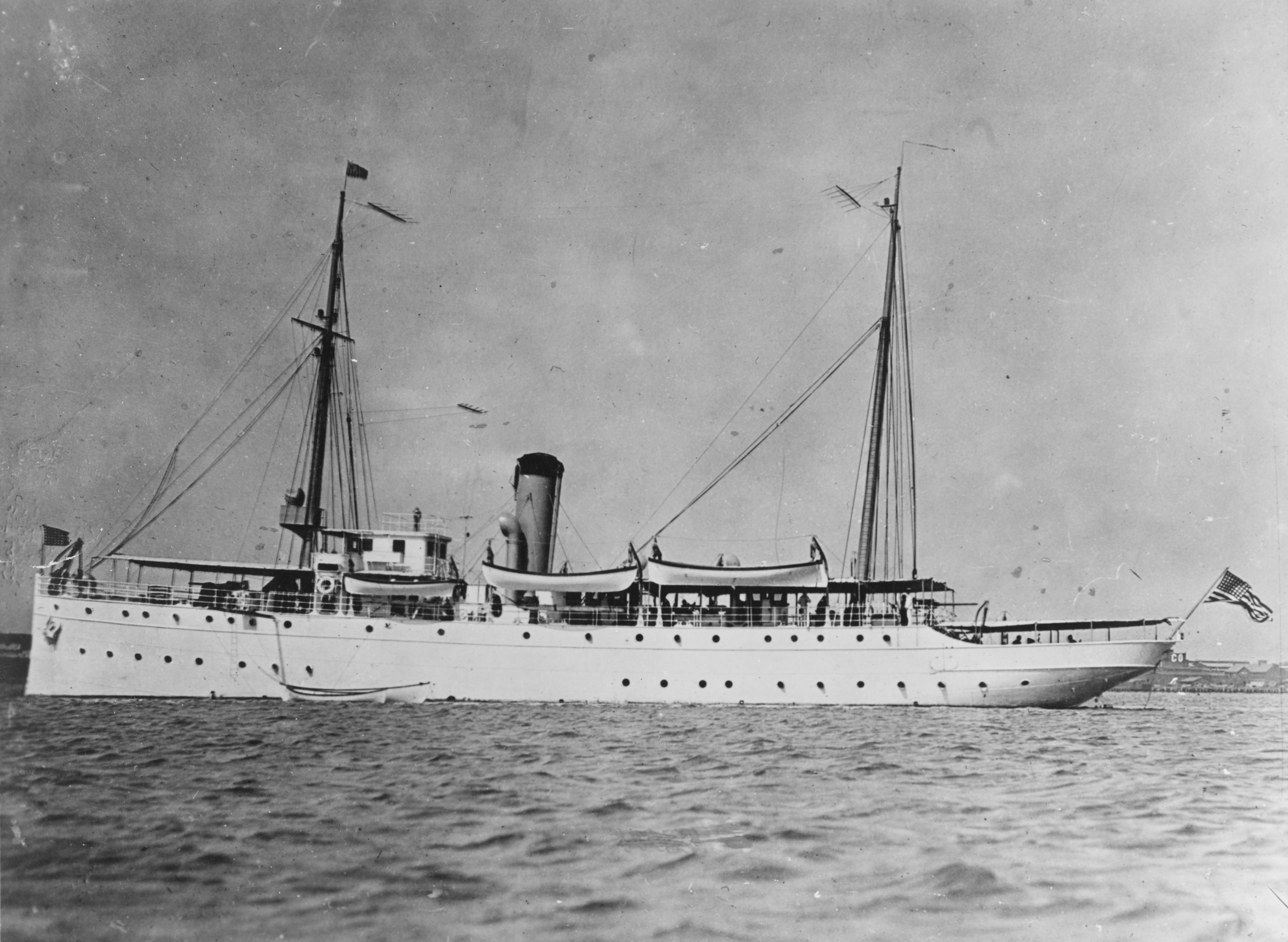
- USCGC Tampa (1912-1918), formerly Miami

History

United States
- Namesake: City of Tampa
- Operator: United States Coast Guard
- Builder: Newport News Shipbuilding and Drydock Corporation, Newport News, Virginia
- Cost: 250,000 US$
- Launched: 10 February 1912
- Sponsored by: Miss Bernes Richardson
- Commissioned: 19 August 1912
- Maiden voyage: 27 April 1912
- Stricken: 26 September 1918
- Fate: Sunk 26 September 1918

General characteristics
- Displacement: 1,181 tons
- Length: 190 ft (58 m)
- Beam: 32.5 ft (9.9 m)
- Draft: 14.1 ft (4.3 m)
- Propulsion: Triple-expansion steam power plant producing 1,300 ihp (970 kW)
- Speed: 13 knots (trial)
- Complement: 70
- Armament: 3 six-pounder rapid-fire guns (1912–1917); 2 x 76mm naval guns (1917–1918); 4 × 3"/.50 cal guns; 2 machine guns(1917); depth charges (projected & roll rack)

USCGC Tampa (ex-Miami) was a Miami-class cutter that initially served in the U.S. Revenue Cutter Service, followed by service in the U.S. Coast Guard and the U.S. Navy. Tampa was used extensively on the International Ice Patrol and also during the Gasparilla Carnival at Tampa, Florida and other regattas as a patrol vessel. It was sunk with the highest American naval combat casualty loss in World War I. (Note: Canney claims that Tampa was the second largest naval loss of World War I. The largest loss of life was with the unexplained sinking in the Bermuda Triangle of the collier USS Cyclops in March 1918 with 236 officers and enlisted. The largest combat naval loss of life was the sinking of Tampa.) The wreck of the Tampa was located in April 2026.

== U.S. Revenue Cutter Service ==
Miami, a cutter built for the Revenue Cutter Service by the Newport News Shipbuilding and Drydock Corporation, was authorized 21 April 1910; launched on 10 February 1912; and placed in commission by the Revenue Cutter Service at its depot at Arundel Cove, Maryland on 19 August 1912.

During the following five years, Miami performed duties typical for cutters. She served several times on the International Ice Patrol, operating out of New York City and Halifax, Nova Scotia, to locate icebergs which might be hazardous to navigation. Her first patrol began on 13 May 1913 out of Halifax, and her last ended on 11 June 1915 when she was relieved by USRC Seneca.

On other occasions, she operated out of various stations along the eastern seaboard enforcing navigation and fishing laws. Her most frequent bases of operation during that period were Key West and Tampa, Florida; the USRC Depot at Arundel Cove, and New York City. Beginning in 1914 she participated in patrolling the Gasparilla Carnival at Tampa each year in February.

== U.S. Coast Guard ==
On 28 January 1915, the United States Revenue Cutter Service and the United States Life-Saving Service were merged to form the present-day United States Coast Guard. (Note: President Woodrow Wilson signed Senate Bill 2337 on 28 January 1915 creating the United States Coast Guard through the merger of the United States Life-Saving Service with the United States Revenue Cutter Service. On that date the newly formed service had 25 sea-going cutters and 19 harbor tugs and launches and 270 stations. The bill authorized 4093 officers, warrant officers, and enlisted men. The service also consisted of one headquarters at Washington, D.C., 17 regional commands, four depots and one academy.) A year later, on 1 February 1916, USCGC Miami was renamed USCGC Tampa just before the start of the annual Gasparilla Pirate Festival in Tampa, Florida.

== U.S. Navy in World War I ==
On 6 April 1917, when the United States entered World War I, Tampa was transferred from Coast Guard control to Navy control for the duration of hostilities, but remained crewed by Coast Guardsmen. On the morning of 9 April, crew members from Tampa and Tallapoosa boarded the Austrian steamer Borneo in Hillsboro Bay near Tampa, seizing the ship and arresting the crew. Borneo was turned over to U.S. Customs authorities and the crew was left in the custody of local authorities. During the next four months, she received heavier armament by trading her three six-pounders for two three-inch (76 mm), a pair of machine guns, and depth charge throwers and racks. After preparations at the Boston Navy Yard, Tampa moved to the New York Navy Yard on 16 September and reported for duty to the commanding officer of USS Paducah. Ordered to duty overseas, the warship departed New York on 29 September in company with Paducah, USS Hubbard, and five French-manned, American-made submarine chasers in tow. After stops at Halifax, Nova Scotia, and Ponta Delgada in the Azores, Tampa and her sailing mates reached Gibraltar on 27 October 1917.

Her war service lasted just eleven months. During that time, she was assigned ocean escort duty protecting convoys from German submarines on the route between Gibraltar and the southern coast of England. Tampa spent more than half of her time at sea and on average steamed over 3,500 nautical miles (6,500 km) per month. Between 27 October 1917 and 31 July 1918, she escorted eighteen convoys between Gibraltar and Great Britain, losing only two ships out of all those escorted.

During the late afternoon of 26 September 1918, Tampa parted company with convoy HG 107, which she had just escorted into the Irish Sea from Gibraltar. Ordered to put into Milford Haven, Wales, she proceeded independently toward her destination. At 19:30 that evening, as she transited the Bristol Channel, the warship was spotted by UB-91. According to the submarine war diary entry, the U-boat dived and maneuvered into an attack position, firing one torpedo out of the stern tube at 20:15 from a range of about 550 meters (600 yd). Minutes later, the torpedo hit Tampa and exploded portside amidships, throwing up a huge, luminous column of water. The cutter sank with all hands: 111 Coast Guardsmen, 4 U.S. Navy personnel, and 16 passengers consisting of 11 British Navy personnel and 5 civilians. She sank in the Bristol Channel at roughly 50°40′N 6°19′W.

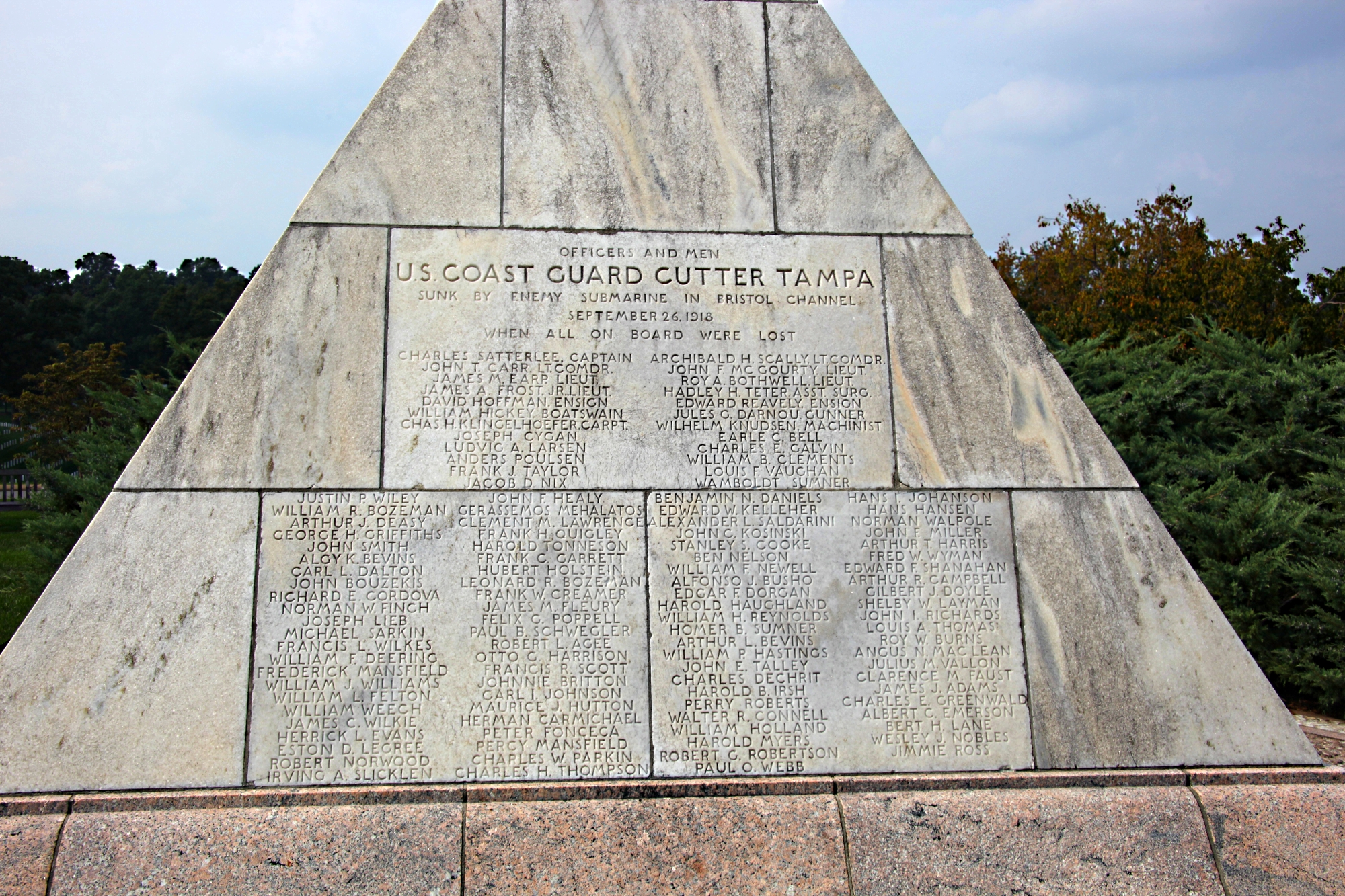
This United States Coast Guard Memorial was dedicated at Arlington National Cemetery on 23 May 1928. The northern face is inscribed with the Tampa's dead. Below is the Biblical phrase, "And Thy Path In The Great Waters."

Alerted by the convoy flagship, whose radio operator reported having felt the shock of an underwater explosion at about 2045, search and rescue efforts over the succeeding three days turned up only some wreckage, clearly identified as coming from Tampa, and a single unidentified body. Three bodies were later recovered, two from a beach near Lamphey, Wales, and the other at sea by a British patrol boat. Tampa was struck from the Navy list as of the date of her sinking.

== Legacy ==
The loss of Tampa is commemorated by the United States Coast Guard Memorial at Arlington National Cemetery and in the chapel at the Brookwood American Cemetery and Memorial in Surrey, England. When five Eagle-class patrol craft of the Navy were transferred to the U.S. Coast Guard in late 1919, they were renamed in honor of Tampa officers. Two U.S. Navy destroyers have been named in honor of her commander, Capt. Charles Satterlee. She is mentioned in the roll of honor in the second verse of "Semper Paratus," the Coast Guard's official march. On Veterans Day, 11 November 1999, the 111 crewmen of Tampa were posthumously presented with the Purple Heart by Secretary of Transportation Rodney E. Slater in ceremonies held at Arlington National Cemetery.

The Gasperados Dive Team, a team of British divers, discovered the wreck of Tampa in April 2026. The ship rests at a depth of about 320 ft (98 m), about 50 nmi (93 km; 58 mi) from Newquay.
