= Charles Satterlee =

United States Coast Guard officer

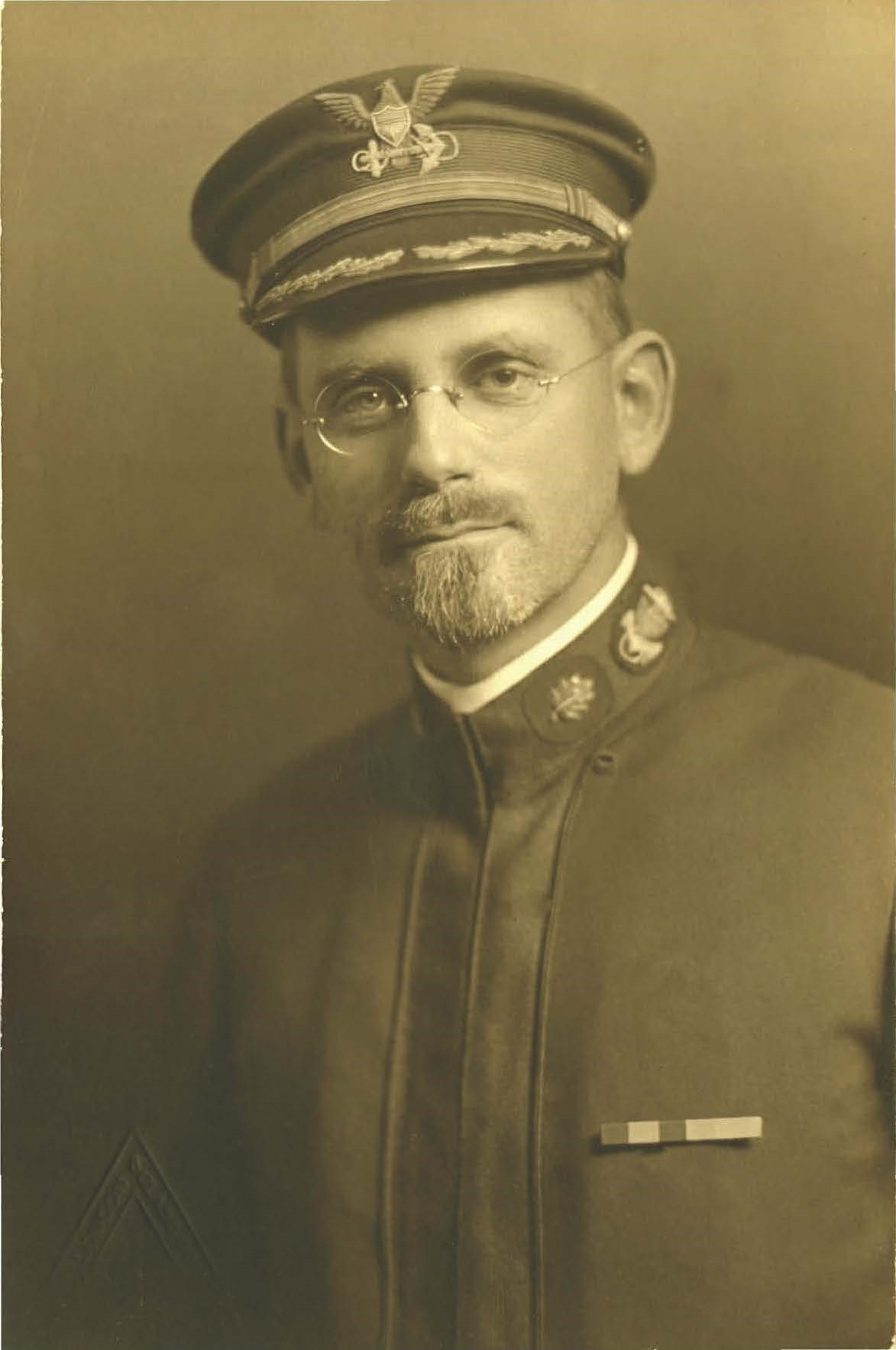
- Born: September 14, 1875; Essex, Connecticut, U.S.
- Died: September 26, 1918 (aged 43)
- Allegiance: United States of America
- Branch: This article incorporates public domain material from websites or documents of the United States Coast Guard.
- Rank: Captain
- Commands: USCGC TAMPA
- Conflicts: First World War

Charles Satterlee (September 14, 1875 – September 26, 1918) was an officer in the United States Coast Guard during World War I.

== Biography ==
Born in Essex, Connecticut, Satterlee was appointed a cadet in the Revenue Cutter Service on 19 November 1895 and graduated in 1898 with a commission. In 1908, he was assigned as supervisor of anchorages at Sault Ste. Marie, Michigan. This duty included command of the USRC Mackinac. In 1909, he was ordered to the USRC Tahoma, then fitting out at Baltimore, Maryland, for a cruise to the Pacific. From 1910 to 1913, he was assistant inspector of lifesaving stations; and, on 1 September 1915, he was promoted to Captain in the Coast Guard.

Captain Satterlee was in command of USCGC Tampa, when that vessel was torpedoed and sunk with all hands on 26 September 1918 in the Bristol Channel while escorting a convoy.

Two ships in the United States Navy have been named USS Satterlee for him. Satterlee Hall at the U.S. Coast Guard Academy is also named after him.
